= List of tourist attractions in Kolkata =

Sites in Kolkata frequently visited by tourists

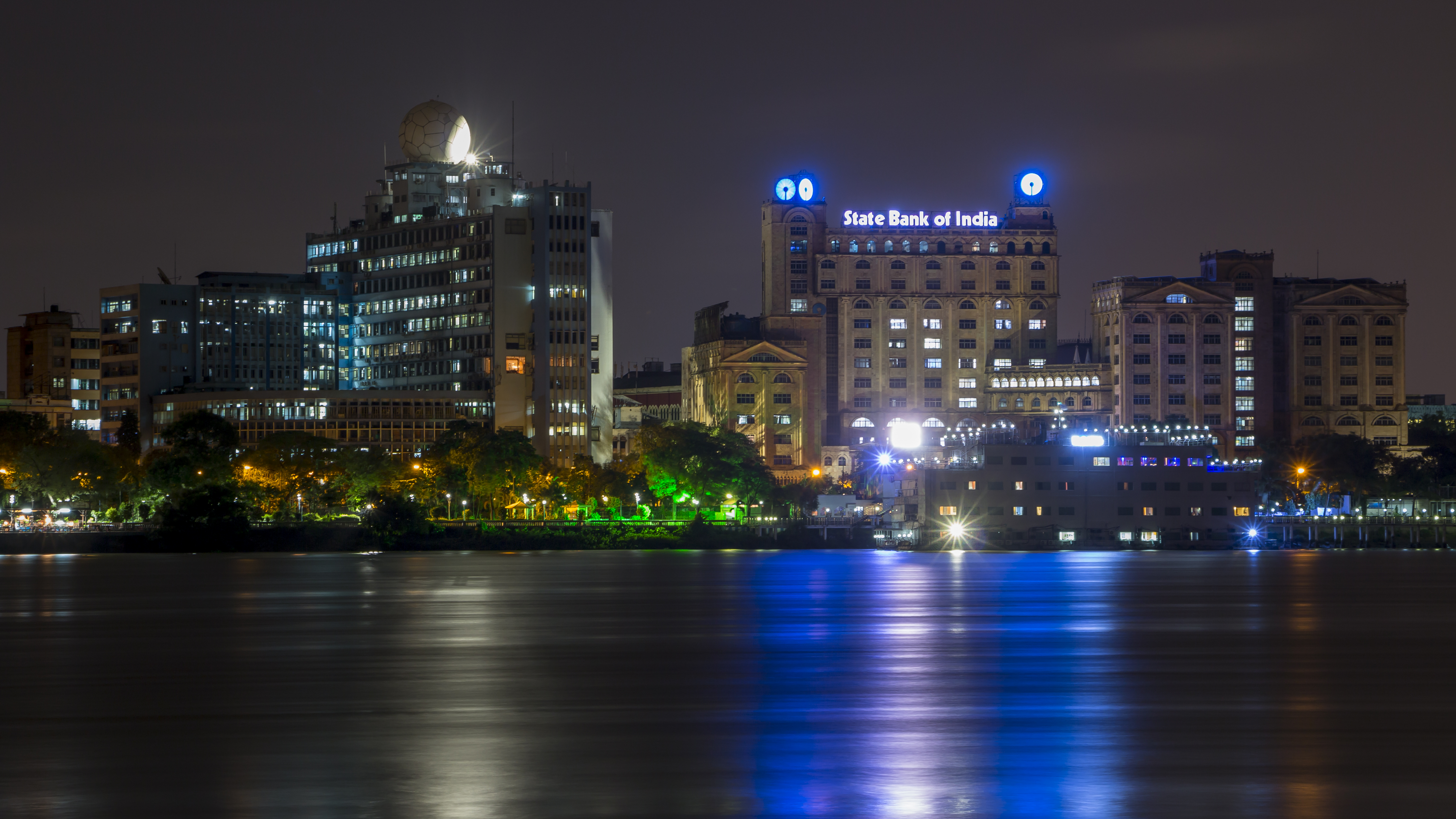
Kolkata City Skyline

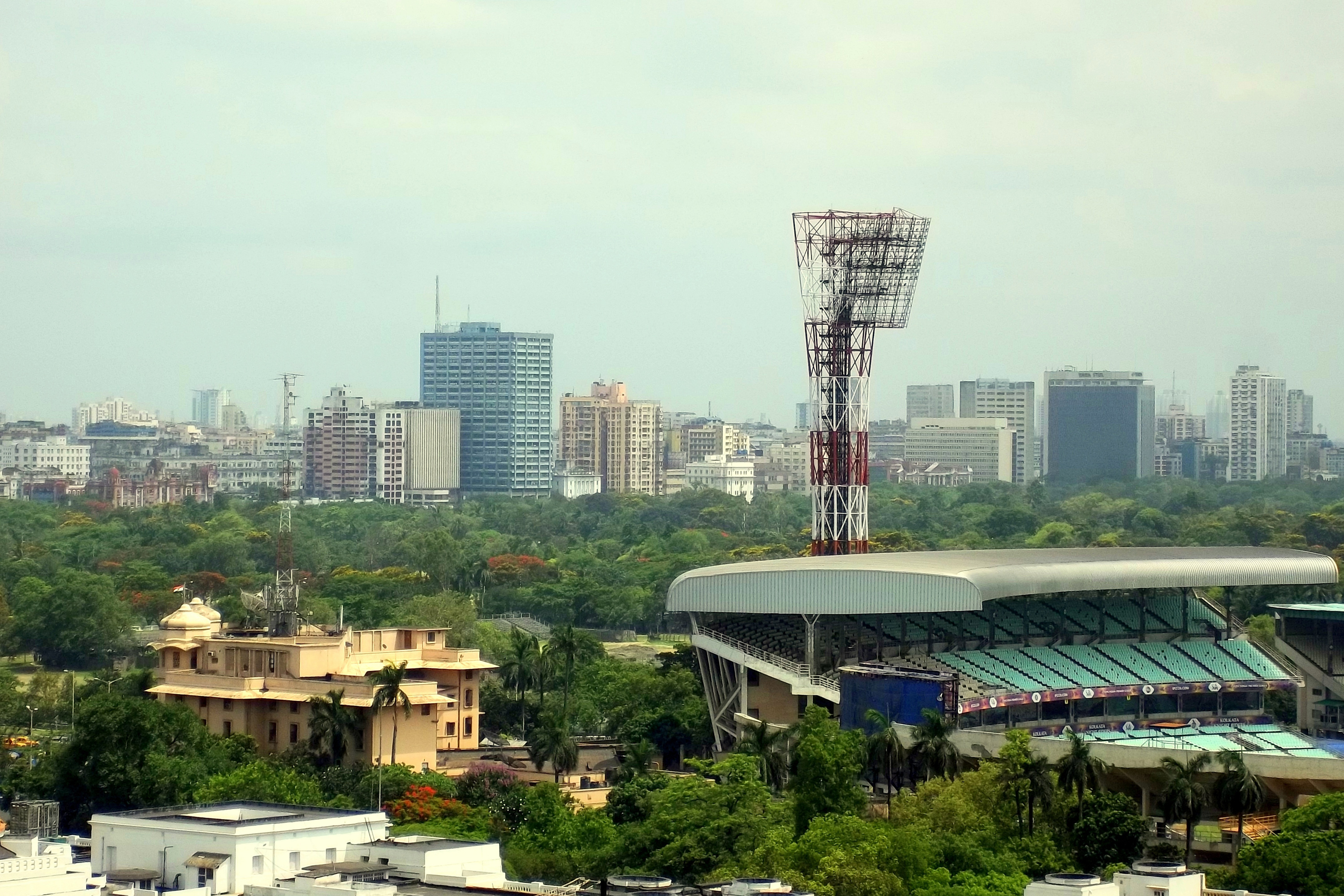
Kolkata, the City of Joy

Kolkata (also known as Calcutta) is currently the second-most populous megacity in India after Delhi. It has many placed to visit which are of interest to tourists.

== Museums and libraries ==
=== Victoria Memorial ===
Victoria Memorial was built in Kolkata to commemorate the Empress of India and Queen of the United Kingdom, Queen Victoria after her death in 1901, located at Queen's Way. The Victoria Memorial was modelled on the Taj Mahal and was commissioned in 1906 by Lord Curzon. Opened to the public in 1921, it was designed by the architects William Emerson and his protégé Vincent Esch at the extraordinary cost of 10.5 million rupees ($262,500), all of which was collected as voluntary donations, mostly from British and Indian nobility. The memorial holds paintings of the British royal family, miniature paintings of the Mughal School, oil paintings of the Company School (notably the uncle - nephew pair of Thomas Daniell and William Daniell), historical artefacts like the throne of the Nawab of Bengal, many lithographs and documents of historical interest, and various post-Raj artefacts significant in the history of Kolkata (added to the collection after independence). The memorial is set in extensive and beautiful lawns and is lit up at night. A laser audio-visual show is held on the lawns every evening. 'Nike', the Greek Goddess of victory, on the top of the museum is said to be haunted and has been prominently featured in many Kolkata stories and novels. It is regarded with pride in Kolkata and colloquially referred to as the "Victoria".

=== Indian Museum ===
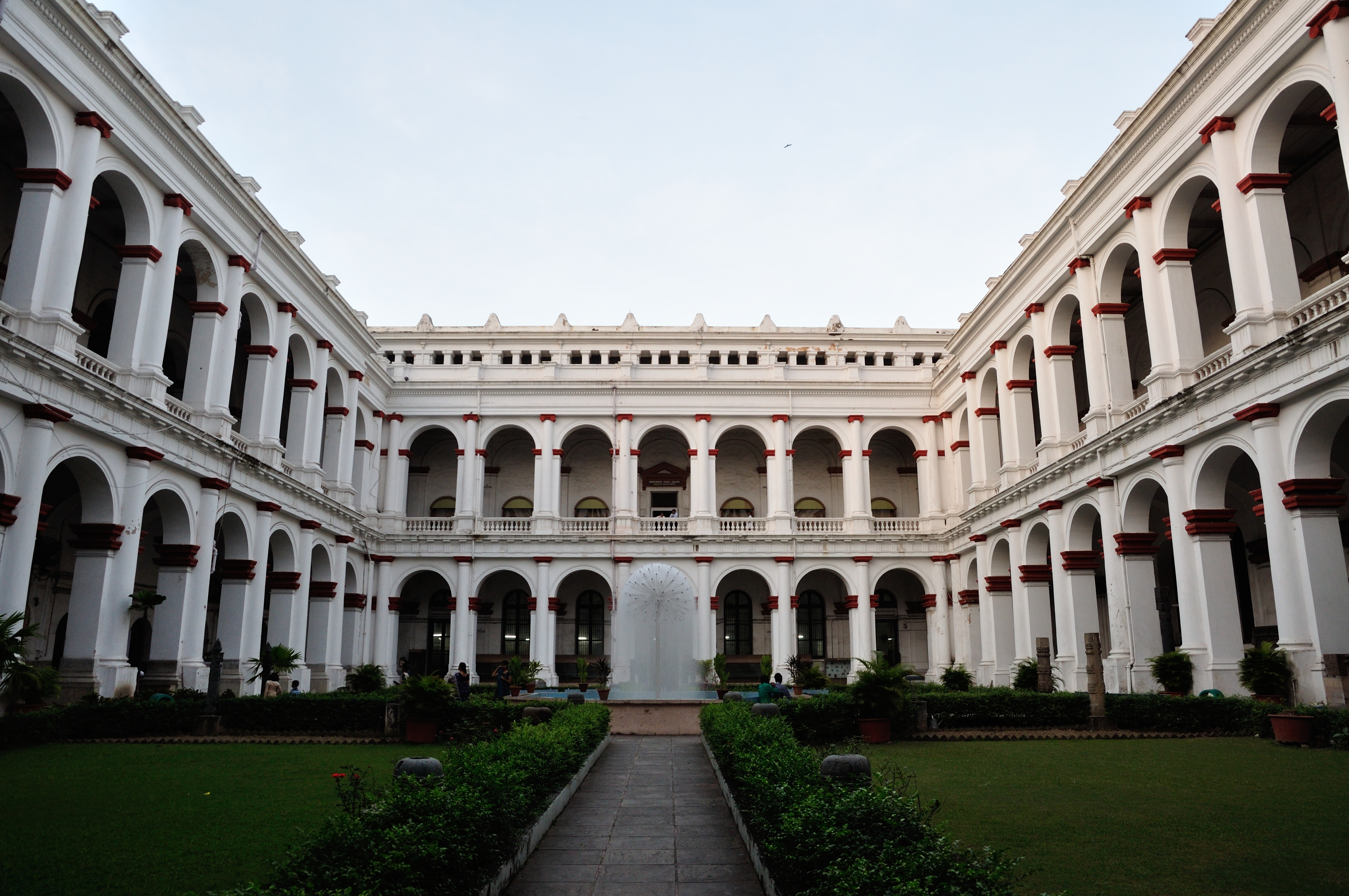
The courtyards and gardens inside the Indian Museum

The Indian Museum is the largest museum in Asia and the oldest in the Asia-Pacific region (est. 1814 at the location of the Asiatic Society). The Museum shifted to its present residence in 1875. Situated on Jawahar Lal Nehru Road, it houses a collection of Indian natural history and an Indian Art collection to rival the Smithsonian Institution and the British Museum. Of specific note are the meteorite hall and dinosaur hall in the Natural History and Geology section, the numismatics section and the collections of Gandhara Art, Burmese woodwork, Mughal miniatures and Tibetan banner sections in the Indian Art section. The Anthropological Survey of India headquarters and the Government College of Art and Craft are housed in the same building. The Geological Survey of India headquarters moved from the museum to Bidhan Nagar recently. The Indian Museum has a library of excellent historical value, with a special focus on the Raj and Kolkata.

=== Marble Palace ===
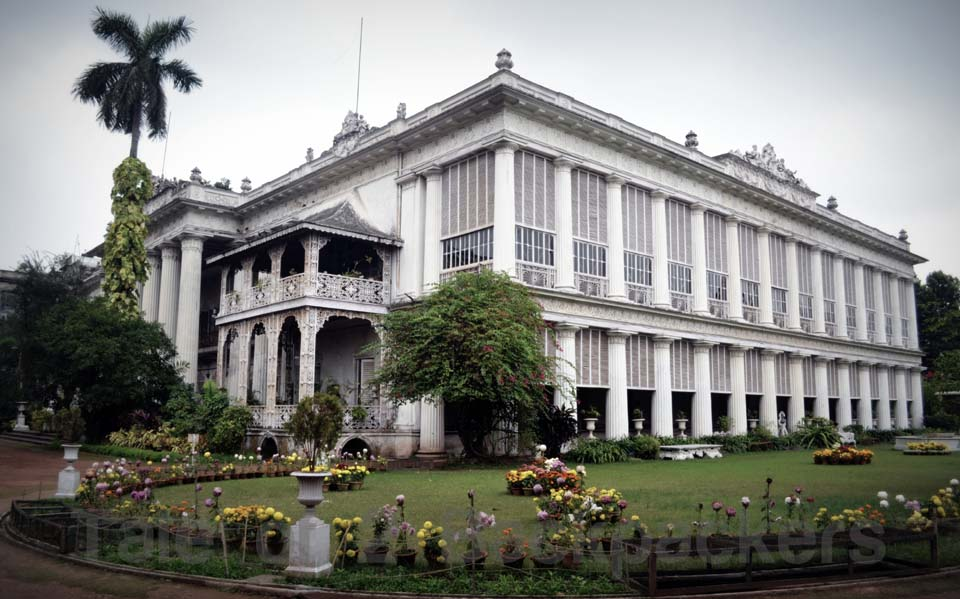
The privately owned Marble Palace

The Marble Palace is a privately owned collection of eclectic sculptures, paintings and a small menagerie and aviary off Chittaranjan Avenue in North Kolkata. Built by Raja Rajendra Mullick in 1835, it houses two little-publicized Reubens and a Joshua Reynolds, not to mention over 50 varieties of marble which grace the interiors of this mansion. Since COVID-19 in India, this palace is strictly prohibited for outsiders and tourists.

=== Birla Industrial & Technological Museum ===
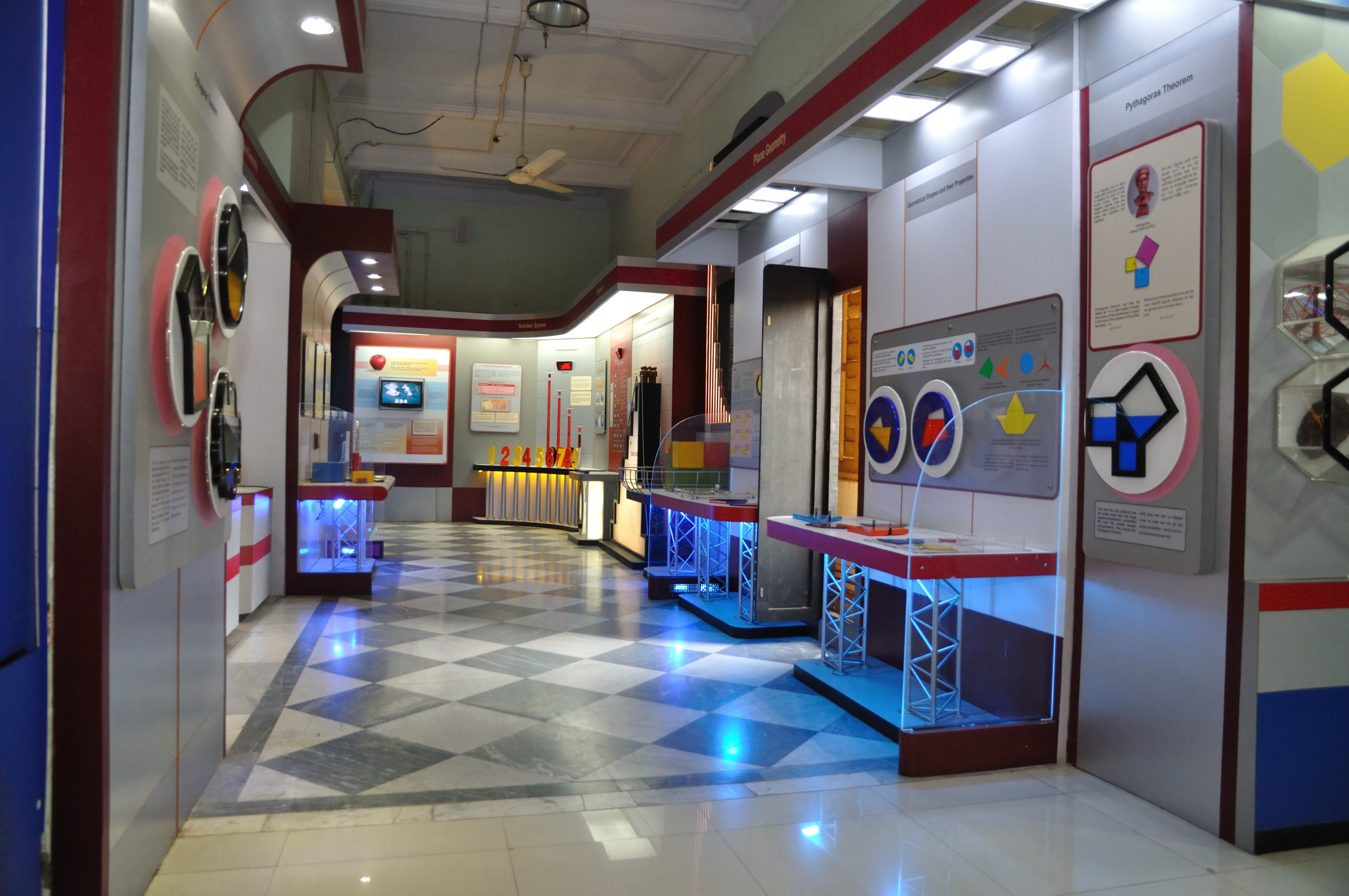
Birla Industrial & Technological Museum

Birla Industrial & Technological Museum on Gurusaday Dutta Road, was inaugurated in 1959 as the first popular science museum in Asia. Modelled on the Deutsches Museum, it has interactive popular science exhibits and a significant collection of historical industrial holdings in India. Its collection of old gramophones, sound recorders, telephones, steam engines, road rollers, and other industrial machinery of the period 1880–1950 is very significant. The museum sports a vintage model of the Rolls-Royce Phantom I make. It also actively organizes summer camps, awareness programs, and astronomy observations for school children.

=== Science City ===
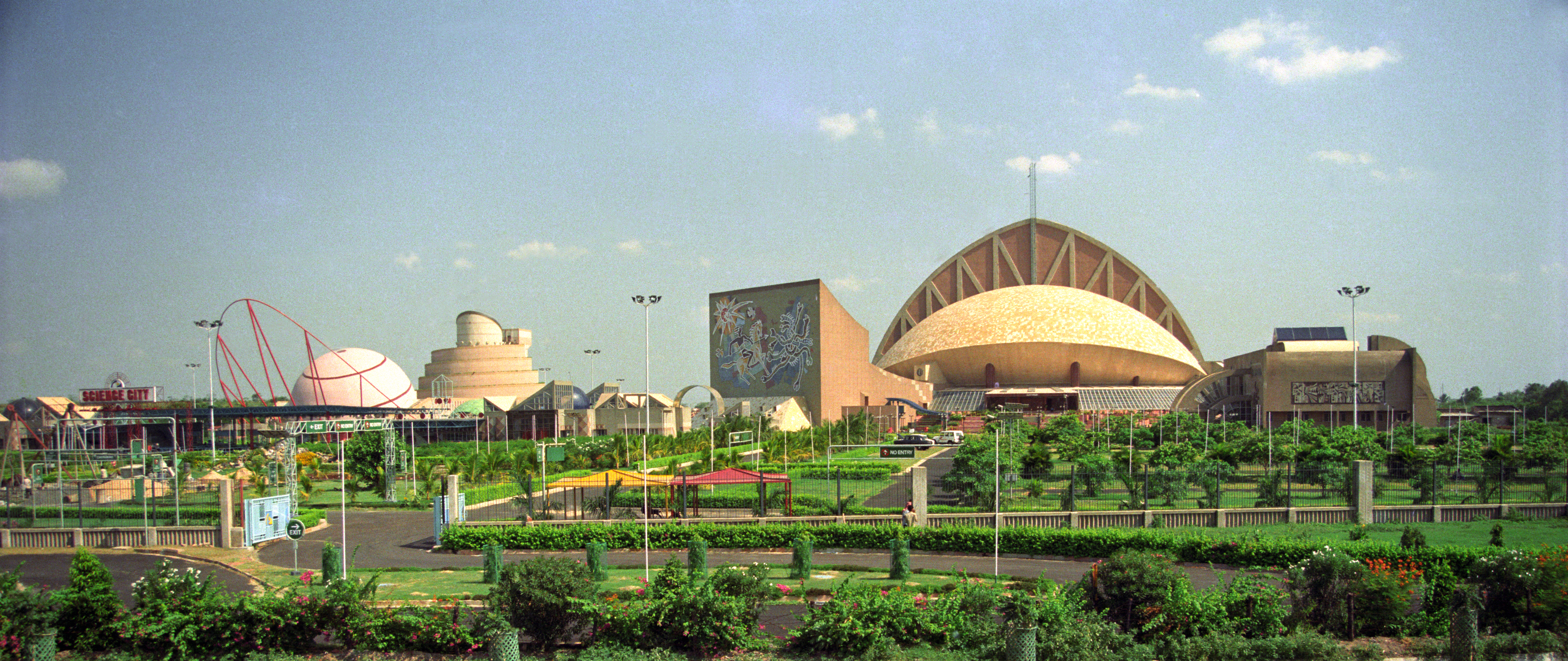
Science City

Science City is a complex on the John Burdon Sanderson Haldane Avenue featuring a lot of interactive science and live bioscience exhibits, as well as having Kolkata's first OMNIMAX theatre.

=== Rabindra Bharati Museum ===
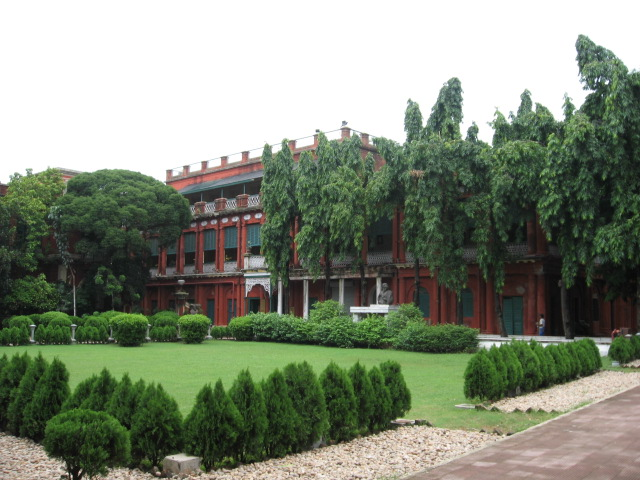
The facade of Jorasanko Thakur Bari

The Rabindra Bharati Museum is the ancestral home of the Tagore family and was converted into a museum in 1961, located at Dwarka Nath Tagore Lane near Rabindra Sarani. The brick mansions were the cultural hub of Kolkata for close to a century and were a major force in the women's liberation movement. It hosted the first Brahmo wedding and was an important center of the Independence movement. The museum has three large galleries - one of the life and works of Rabindranath, a second gallery about his close relatives such as father Debendranath Tagore, Abanindranath Tagore, Gaganendranath Tagore etc. and a third gallery on the Bengal Renaissance in general.

=== Gurusaday Museum ===
Gurusaday Museum, on Diamond Harbour Road, is the outcome of a lifetime collection of traditional Bengal folk arts in undivided Bengal by Sir Gurusaday Dutt. On his death in 1941, the collection was handed over to the Bratachari Society founded by Sir Gurusaday Dutt to preserve and protect Bengal folk arts. It was opened as a museum to the public with the help of the Government of India in 1963. It contains, among other fine handicrafts, terracotta panels, kantha or folk quilt work, and patas (or hand painted scrolls of the late 1900s), notably of the Kalighat School. The Asutosh Museum of Indian Art, on College Street, is the other museum specializing in Bengal folk arts, but with significant archaeological holdings from sites in West Bengal and Bihar like Chandraketugarh and Tamluk. The first university owned museum in India, run by the University of Calcutta and is named after its famous vice chancellor Sir Asutosh Mukherjee.

=== Nehru Children's Museum ===
Nehru Children's Museum is named after Jawaharlal Nehru, whose love for children was well known. It is located at Jawahar Lal Nehru Road. In order to pay homage to Pandit Jawahar Lal Nehru, National Cultural Association established the Museum in 1972 in Panditji's name on his birthday. The museum has a collection of dolls and toys from across the globe and has a doll - based retelling of the Indian epics Ramayana and Mahabharata. Established in 1972 close to the Victoria Memorial, and commonly referred to as "Nehru Children's Museum"; this museum is aging awkwardly fast. There are dolls which are not only bounded to India, but also of different states, countries, religion like the dolls of Bangladesh, Japan, China, Rhodesia, Korea, Indonesia. Other than these, there are dolls which are dressed according to the places like Delhi, Assam, West Bengal, Chennai, Maharashtra, Andaman, Mexico, Portuguese and many more. There is even a separate cabin displaying various forms and styles of Ganesh.

=== Sabarna Sangrahashala ===
Sabarna Sangrahashala located at Baro Bari, Barisha, is the only family museum of Kolkata open to public. It was established in 2005 by the Sabarna Roy Choudhury Paribar Parishad and is a tourist destination specially for those who want to know more about the history of Kolkata. It is also a research institute in the making. The museum possesses some of the rarest Kabulatipatras, documents and articles of historical importance besides several artifacts dating back to the 17th century. The museum is dedicated to students for creating an awareness of history, heritage, and culture of the land. Every year in the month of February, the museum organizes the International History and Heritage Exhibition which is the only one of its kind in Eastern India.

=== National Library of India ===
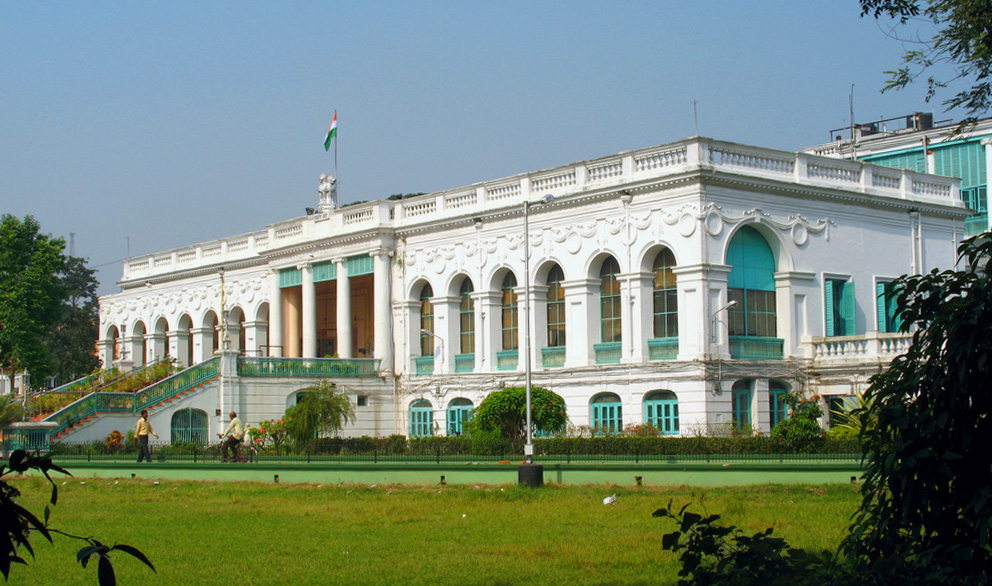
National Library

National Library of India located in Alipore is India's leading public library. It was inaugurated in 1836 by the Governor General Lord Metcalfe by transferring 4675 books from the College of Fort William. Public donations were the main source of books for the library, and by donations of Rupees 300 from proprietors. Dwarakanath Tagore was the first proprietor of the library. The library was initially only partially public, as poor students could use the library for a limited period of time. The Imperial Library was founded in 1891 by merging several libraries like those of the East India College and East India Board. Governor General Lord Curzon initiated the merger of these two libraries into a single Imperial Library in 1903 at the Metcalfe Hall. The goal of the library was to collect every book written about India at any time. The Assistant Librarian of the British Museum John Macfarlane was the first librarian and was succeeded by the first Indian librarian Harinath De. The library was moved to its present quarters in Belvedere Estate, Alipore and renamed the National Library. It is a fully public library which co-ordinates the activities of all other Indian public libraries. True to its goal, any book published in India today has to send one copy to the National library in the spirit of the Library of Congress, United States.

=== Birla Planetarium ===
Birla Planetarium in Kolkata runs many shows on educational and entertainment purposes about astronomy, astrophysics, space science, history of astronomy and mythology regarding stars and planets. It is situated on Jawahar Lal Nehru Road near several notable places like Indian Museum, Victoria Memorial, Maidan, and St. Paul's Cathedral. It was inaugurated by the Prime Minister of India, Jawaharlal Nehru, on 2 July 1963. Projection on spherical ceiling accompanied by live audio (Bengali, English, and Hindi) is the major attraction of the Birla Planetarium. It also has an electronics laboratory, astronomy gallery, and an astronomical observatory equipped with a Celestron C-14 Telescope.

=== Other museums and libraries ===
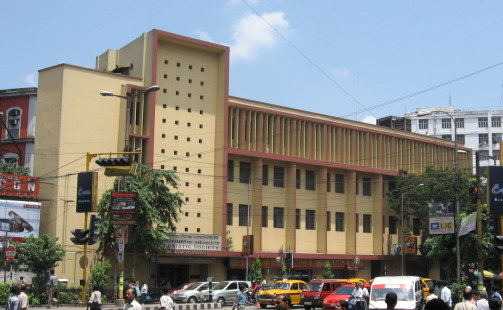
New building of the Asiatic Society

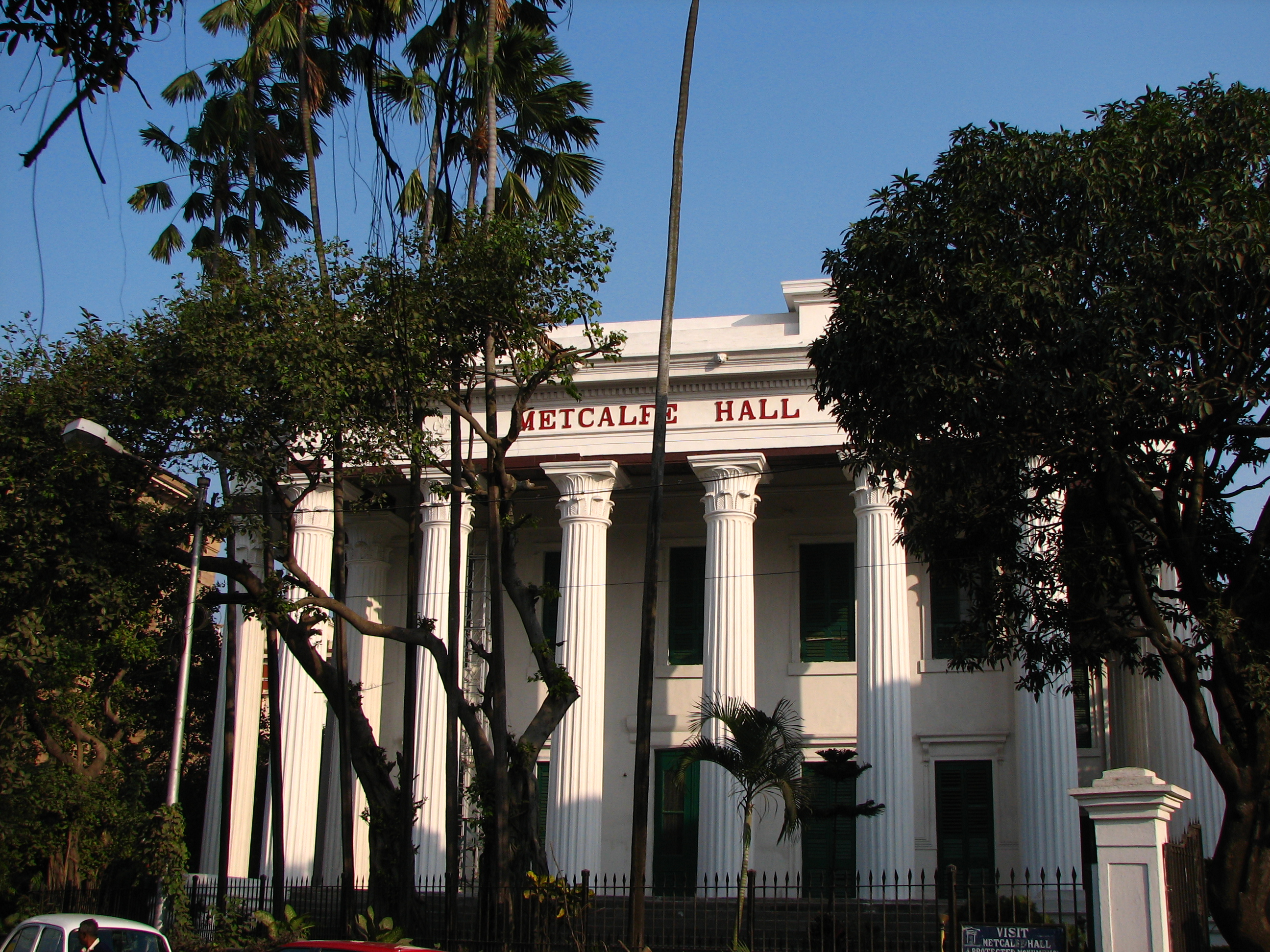
Metcalfe Hall

Kolkata also has other small museums like the Rail Museum, Tram Museum, Naval Aircraft Museum, Fanatic Sports Museum, Ashutosh Museum of Indian Art, Netaji Bhawan, Swami Vivekananda Museum, State Archaeological Museum, Academy of Fine Arts, The Asiatic Society, Maulana Abul Kalam Azad Museum, Mother's Wax Museum and the Police Museum.

The other popular Kolkata libraries include the General Library of Ramakrishna Mission Institute of Culture located at Gol Park, maintained by the Ramakrishna Mission, Kolkata. The collection of this library was initially confined to a few books and journals, stacked in one or two book-cases. Dr. Barid Baran Mukherjee gifted over 33,000 volumes to the library in 1941.

Other historically significant libraries are Calcutta Club library, Asiatic Society, Indian Museum, Presidency University, Scottish Church College and St. Xavier's College, Calcutta.

== Heritage administrative offices ==
=== Calcutta High Court ===
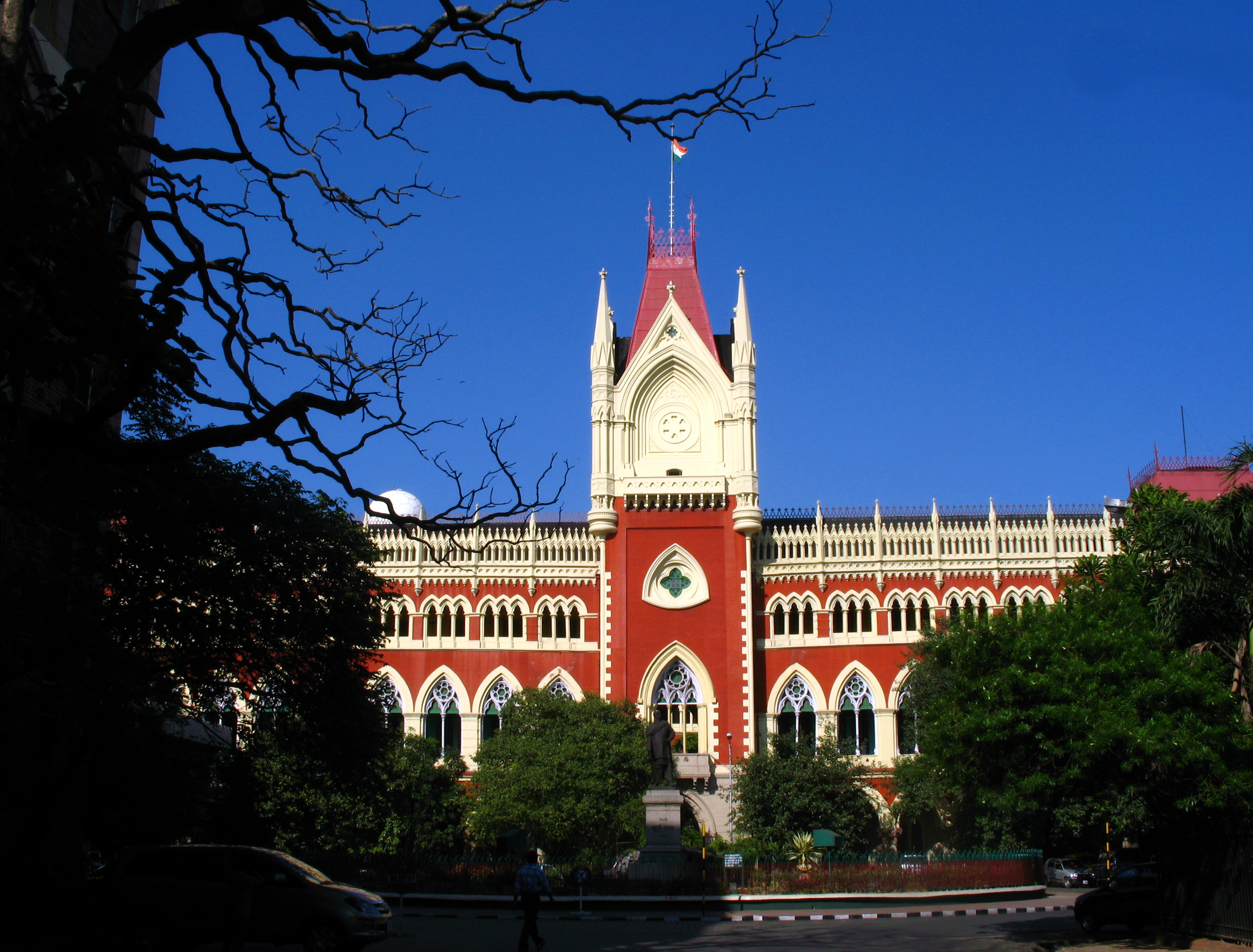
Facade of the Calcutta High Court

Calcutta High Court – It is the oldest High Court in India. It was established as the High Court of Judicature at Fort William on 1 July 1862 under the High Courts Act, 1861. It has jurisdiction over the state of West Bengal and the Union Territory of the Andaman and Nicobar Islands. The High Court building is an exact replica of the Stand Haus in Ypres, Belgium. It is recorded that when the original Stand Haus burnt down, a blueprint of Granville's Calcutta High Court had to be consulted before rebuilding it. The court has a sanctioned judge strength of 63. Despite, the name of the city was officially changed from Calcutta to Kolkata in 2001, the old name is retained by the court as it is an institution.

=== Bankshall Court ===
Bankshall Court – It is the present City Sessions Court of Kolkata. Two of its buildings are old heritage.

=== Raj Bhavan ===
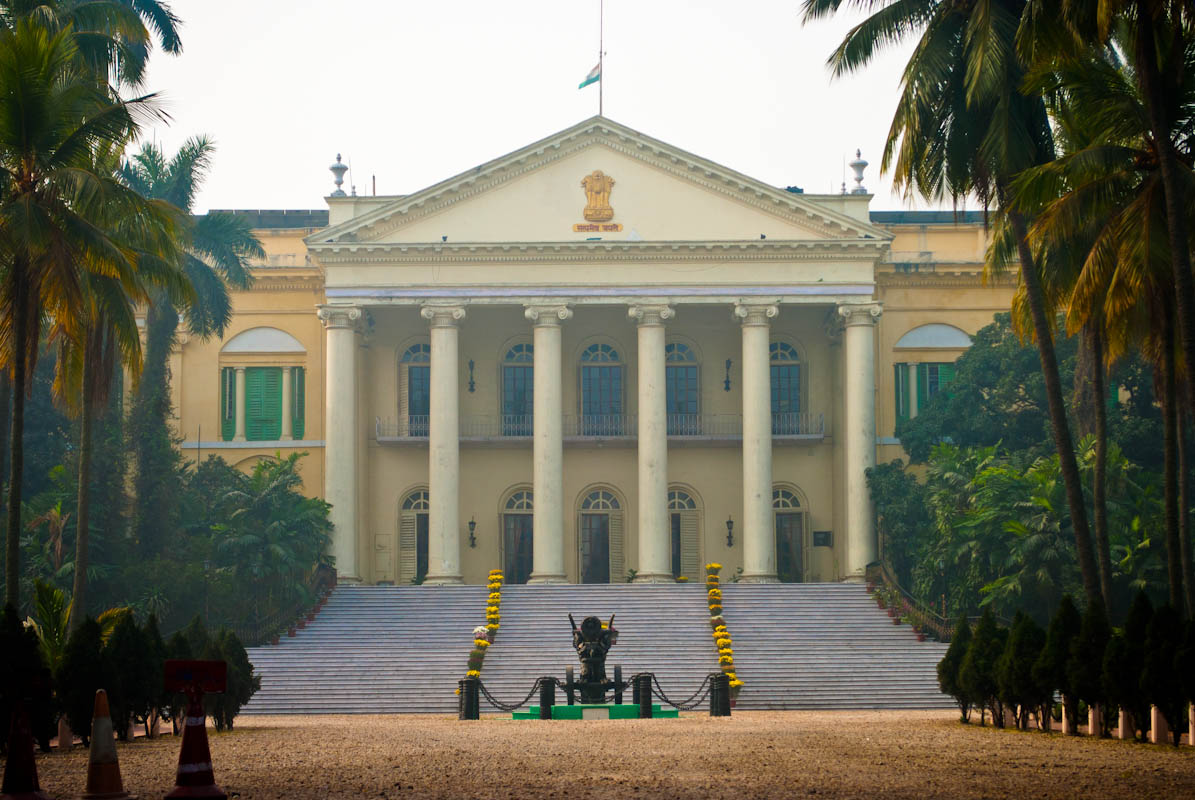
The facade of the Raj Bhavan

Raj Bhavan (Government House) – It was built in the early 19th century and is modeled on Kedleston Hall. The house was once the seat of the viceroys of India; later, when the government moved to New Delhi, it became the residence of the Governor of Bengal, a function that it fulfills to this day. While the basic features of Kedleston have been faithfully copied (the Palladian Front, the Dome etc.), Government House is a much larger, three-storeyed structure. Also, the Government of India evidently did not have the funding constraints that forced the Curzons to leave their house incomplete: Government House has all four wings originally conceived for Kedleston. So today, a 'complete', brick built Kedleston, on a much grander scale, is located in its acres of gardens at the heart of the Kolkata business district.

=== Town Hall ===
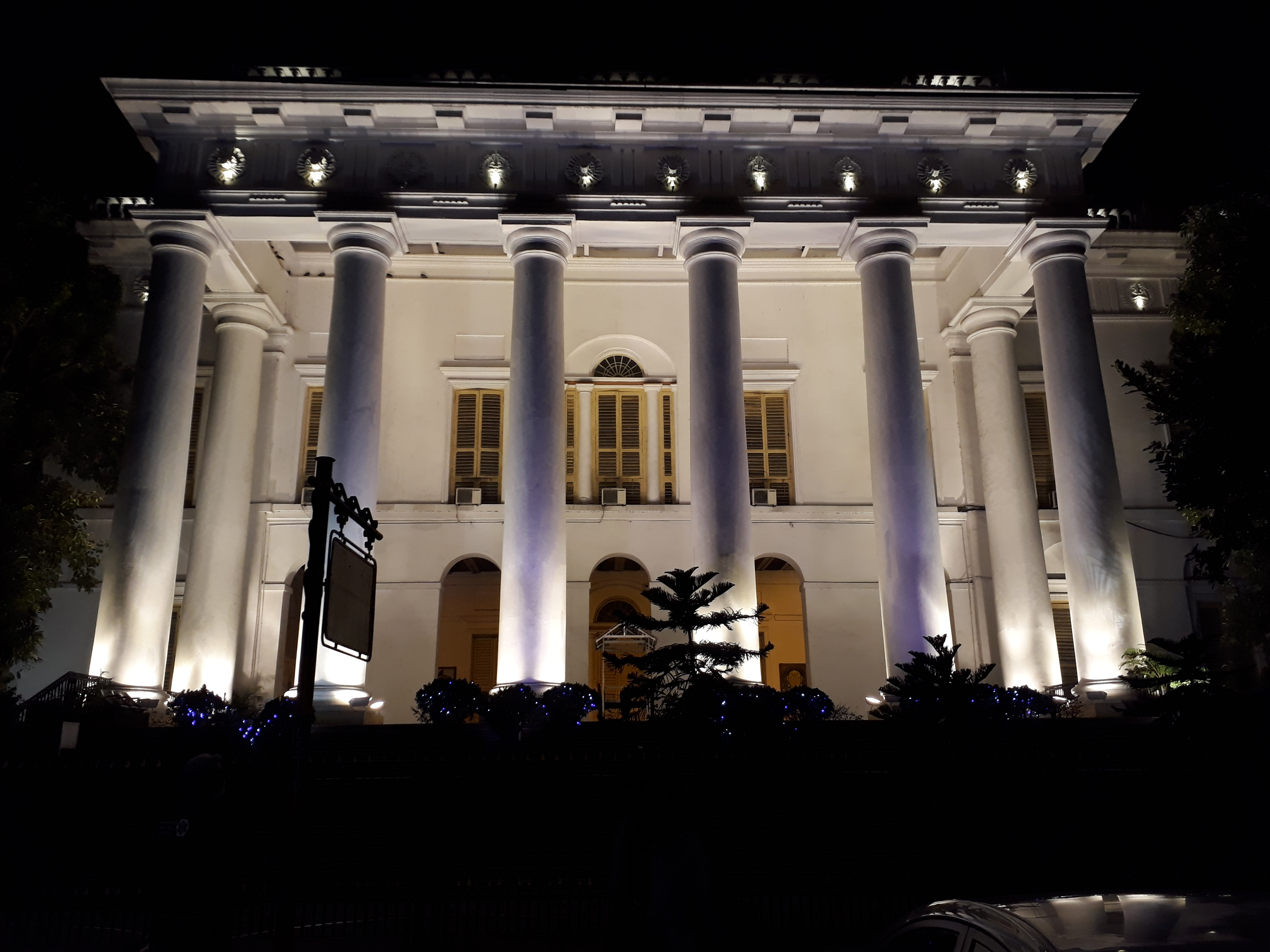
Town Hall

Town Hall – In Roman-Doric style, this building was built by the architect Col. John Garstin in 1813 with a fund of Rupees seven lakhs raised from lottery to provide the Europeans with a place for social gatherings. At first, the hall was placed under a committee, which allowed the public to use the hall under such terms and conditions as were fixed by the Government. The public could visit the ground floor hall to see statues and large size portrait paintings, but they were not allowed indiscriminate access to the upper storey. Applications for the use of the upper storey were to be made to the committee. In 1867 Town Hall came under the custody of the Calcutta Municipality (later on Kolkata Municipal Corporation). In the year of 1897 the Town Hall had been partly renovated. After political independence in 1947, indiscriminate interference with the structure inevitably took its toll. Fortunately, that was prevented in 1998 by timely intervention. The town hall was featured on the 6th leg of The Amazing Race 18, when the teams had to compete in a tea-drinking roadblock.

=== Writer's Building ===
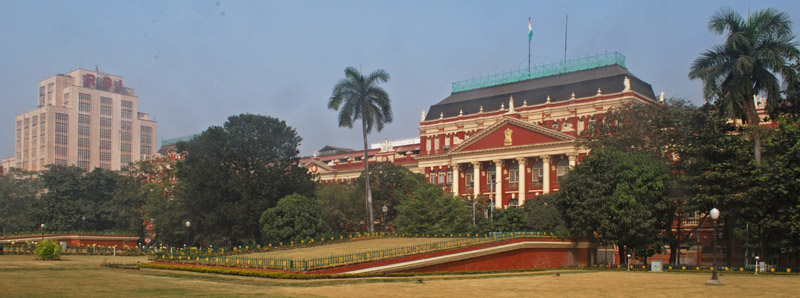
A panoramic view of Writers' Building in Central Kolkata

Writers' Building – It is the secretariat building of the State Government of West Bengal in India. The Writers' Building originally served as the office for writers of the British East India Company, hence the name. Designed by Thomas Lyon in 1777 the Writers' building has gone through several extensions over the years. In 1821 a 128 ft-long verandah with ionic style columns, each 32 ft high, were added on the first and second floors. From 1889 to 1906 two new blocks were added. It acquired its Greco-Roman look, complete with the portico in the central bay and the red surface of the exposed brick. The parapet was put in place and the statues sculpted by William Fredric Woodington in 1883, that line the terrace, were installed. The giant pediment at the centre is crowned with the statue of Minerva. The terrace also contains several other statues and notable among them are four clusters of statues, christened 'Justice', 'Commerce', 'Science' and 'Agriculture', with the Greek Gods and Goddesses of these four streams (Zeus, Hermes, Athena and Demeter respectively) flanked by a European and an Indian practitioner of these vocations, adorn the building.

The 150 meter long Writers' Building covers the entire northern stretch of the a water body locally called Lal Dighi in Binay Badal Dinesh Baag area. Various departments of the West Bengal government are housed in this building. It is an edifice of great political significance and memories of the Indian Independence Movement. Writer's building was used as Chief Minister's Office and secretariat. However, from October 2013, certain departments and the office of Chief Minister moved to Nabanna in Howrah to facilitate restoration of Writers Building.

=== General Post Office ===
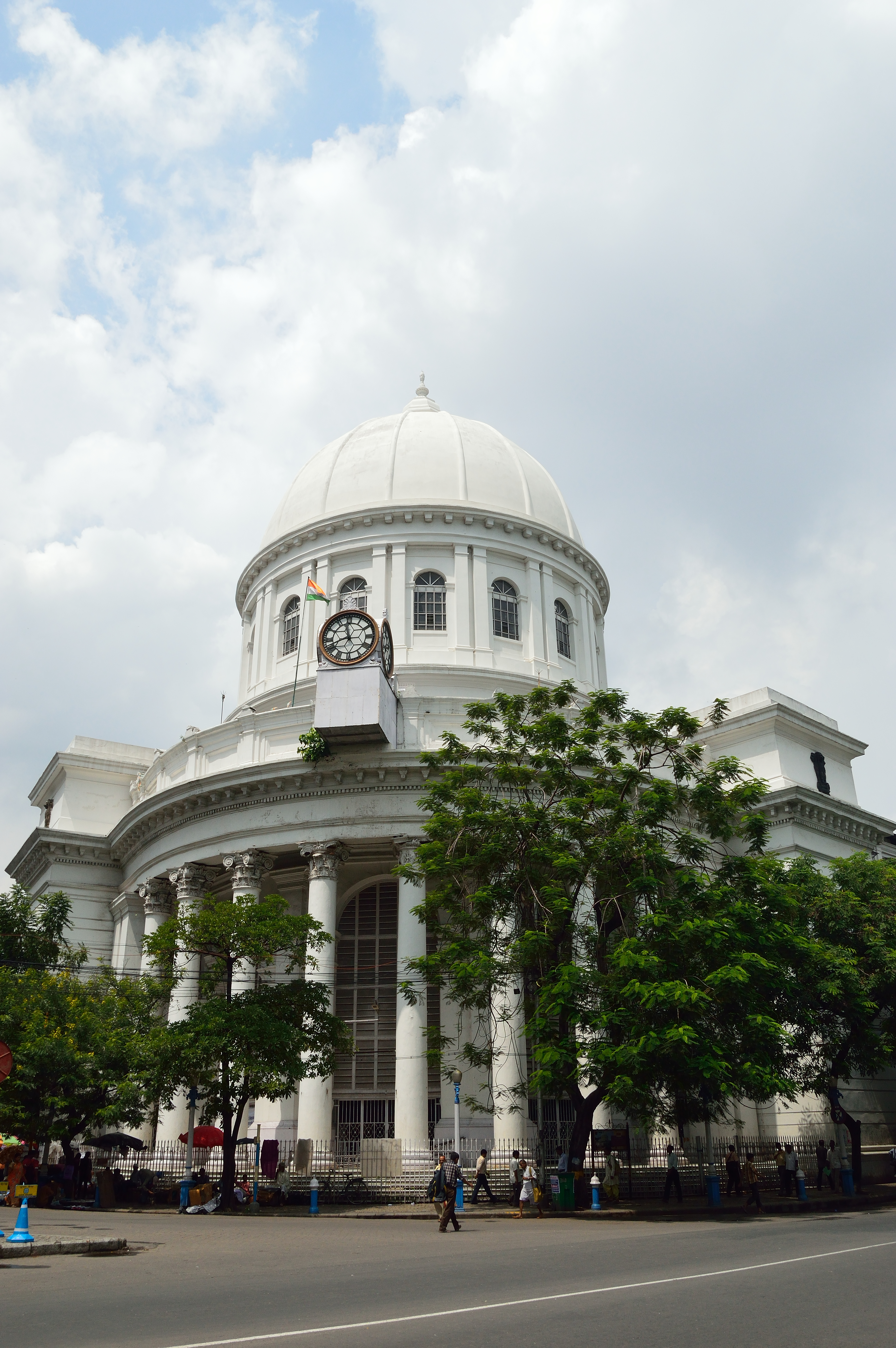
The General Post Office (GPO) in Kolkata

General Post Office – It is the central post office of the city of Kolkata, India and the chief post office of West Bengal. The post-office handles most of the city's inbound and outbound mail and parcels. Situated in the Binay Badal Dinesh Baag area, the imposing structure of the GPO is one of the landmarks in the city.

=== Heritage train stations ===
Howrah station is one of the five intercity train stations serving Howrah and Kolkata, India; the others are Sealdah Station and Kolkata railway station in Kolkata and Shalimar Station and Santragachi Station in Howrah. Howrah is situated on the West bank of the Hooghly River, linked to Kolkata by the magnificent Howrah Bridge which is an icon of Kolkata. It is the oldest station and the largest railway complex in India.

=== Other heritage administrative offices ===
- Esplanade Mansions
- South Eastern Railway Headquarters, Garden Reach

== Historic hotels ==
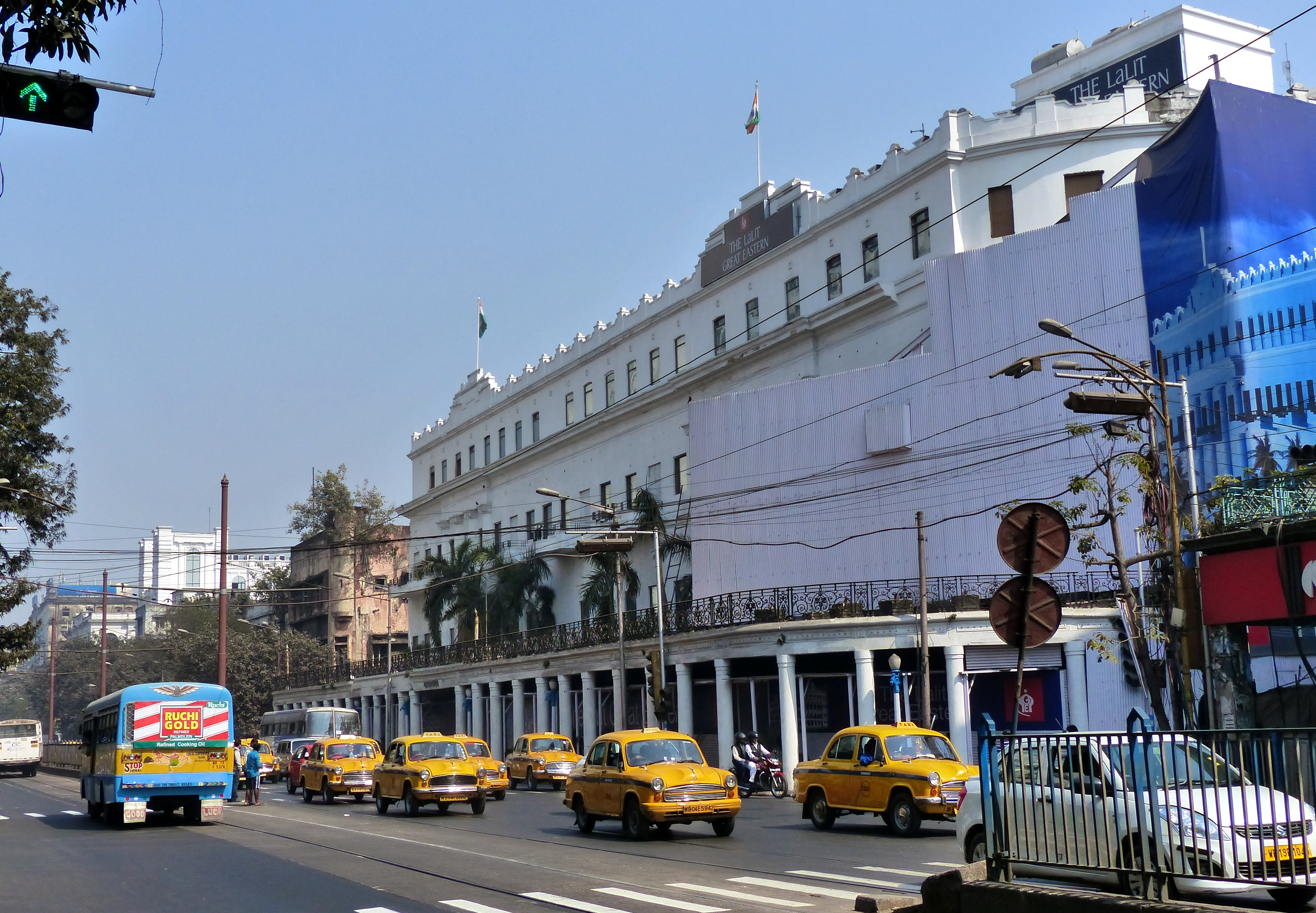
The Great Eastern Hotel (officially Lalit Great Eastern Hotel) in February 2014, a large part of the hotel is still under renovation

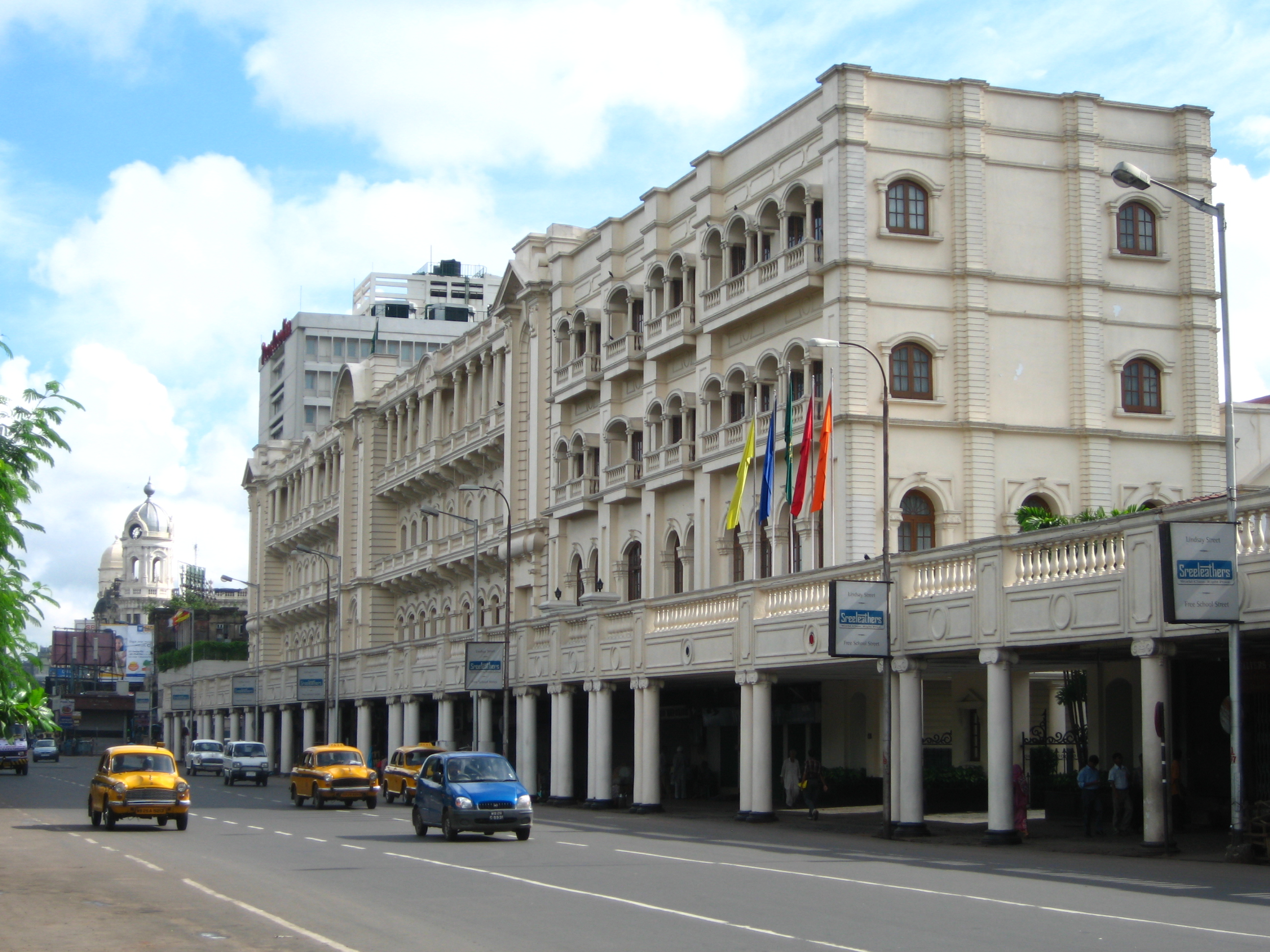
The Grand Hotel, now

The Great Eastern Hotel (officially Lalit Great Eastern Hotel) was founded as the Auckland Hotel in 1841, at the crossroads of the Hemanta Basu Sarani and British India Street, founded by confectioner David Wilson and named after the then Governor General Lord Auckland. It grew from strength to strength over the 19th and first half of the 20th century. Locally known as "Wilson's Hotel", it was also known as "Auckland Hotel and the "Hall of Nations" in the 19th century, and was referred to as the "Japani Hotel" (Japanese Hotel) colloquially in the 20th century, due to a large number of Japanese tourists there. The hotel was extremely elite, referred to as the "Jewel of the East" and "the best hotel East of the Suez" by Mark Twain on his voyage along the Equator, and described by Rudyard Kipling in "The City of Dreadful Night". It had notable board members like the author Peary Chand Mitra and stockholders like W. C. Bonnerjee - president of the Indian National Congress. The hotel was famous for its new year parties thrown by Maharajahs (like the Maharajah of Cooch Behar) until the 1950s. It has been host to such notables as Elizabeth II on her India visit, Nikita Khrushchev's delegation in the 1950s, and visiting international cricket teams. The hotel kitchens, staffed by the legendary Baruahs of Chittagong (now in Bangladesh), was the talk of Kolkata. It steadily progressed downhill since the 1970s, and was taken over by the Government of West Bengal in 1975 on grounds of insolvency. Labour union problems caused the hotel to worsen until a sensationalist news campaign by The Telegraph exposed the sorry state of the hotel in the 1990s. The hotel was privatized in November 2005 with the help of PricewaterhouseCoopers and has been re-christened The Lalit Great Eastern Kolkata. After an extensive restoration, a part of the property was reopened in November 2013. The Lalit Great Eastern offers 244 rooms and suites along with four restaurants and bars, the largest conference and banqueting facility in Kolkata, besides all other five-star deluxe facilities and services.

The Grand Hotel had humble beginnings. In the 1870s Mrs. Annie Monk opened her boarding house at numbers 13, 14 and 15 Chowringhee. In the meantime, Arathoon Stephen, an Armenian from Isfahan had arrived in Calcutta and proceeded to make his fortune in the jewellery business. By the early 20th century he had put together a sizeable fortune and had purchased numbers 16 and 17 Chowringhee. Soon he purchased Mrs. Monk's boarding house and number 18 Chowringhee as well, and proceeded to develop all the properties together into the hotel that came to be known as the Grand Hotel.

Acquired by the real-estate baron, it turned into a 3-story 500-room hotel. Acquired by hotelier Mohan Singh Oberoi in 1938, it became the Oberoi Grand. The hotel got a major lift during World War II when about 4000 soldiers were billeted there and would party regularly.

== City parks ==
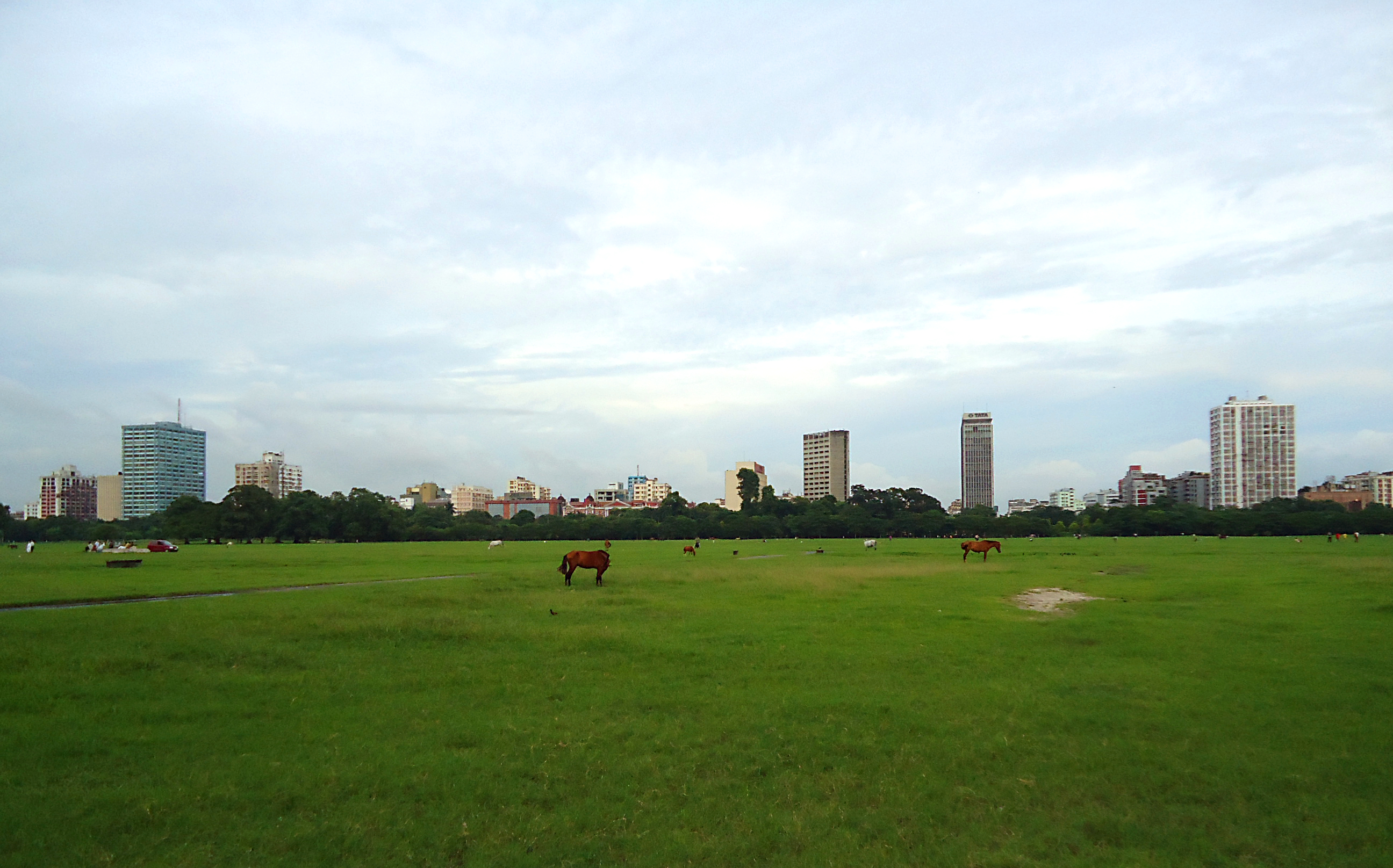
Maidan, overlooking the Chowringhee Skyline

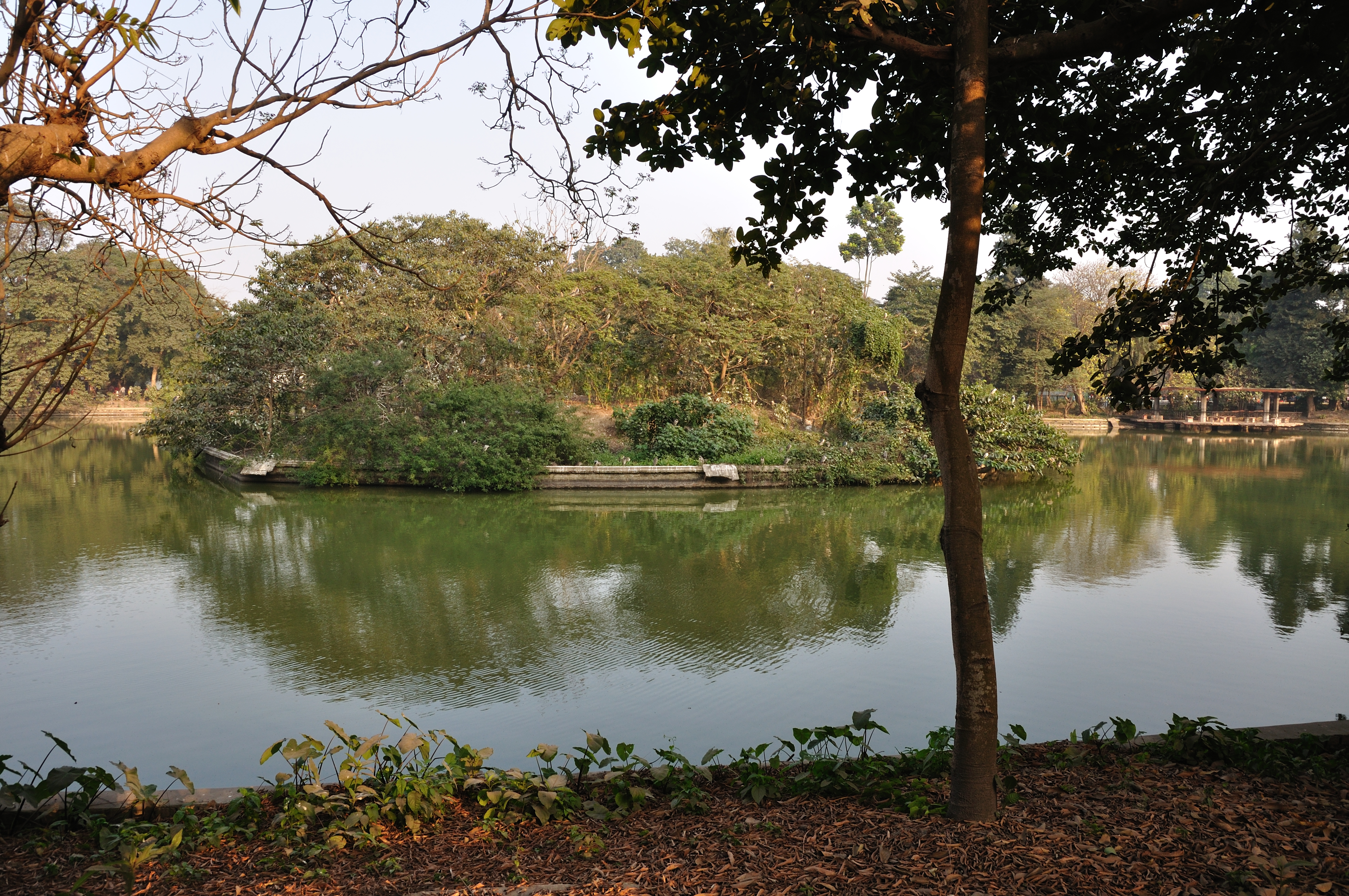
One of the few lakes inside the Alipore Zoological Gardens

Maidan means "field" in Hindi, Marathi, Urdu and Bengali. The Kolkata Maidan was once a vast uninterrupted field right down to the edge of the Hoogli River, but is now being encroached upon by the city and is fragmented by roads. The Maidan has nurtured sports like Polo and has been the home of equestrianism, horse racing, football, cricket and rugby in Kolkata. It houses numerous clubs including the "big three" of Indian football - Mohun Bagan Athletic Club, East Bengal Football Club and Mohammedan Sporting Club along with their respective home stadiums. The arterial Jawaharlal Nehru Road, the Eden Gardens, the Millennium Park and the associated 3 km long Riverfront beautification project border the Maidan. The Maidan abounds with monuments and statues, the most famous of them being Shaheed Minar and the statue of ace footballer Gostho Pal. Elliot Park, Mohor Kunja and Victoria Memorial complex are three parks which are situated in the Maidan area.

Rabindra Sarobar or "The Lake" or 'Dhakuria Lake' is an artificial lake and urban park in the spirit of Central Park, New York City. The park has a lake and an island with a footbridge, an open-air amphitheatre (Nazrul Mancha), a sports stadium (Rabindra Sarobar Stadium), a children's park and the rowing clubs of Calcutta Rowing Club, Bengal Rowing Club and Lake Club.

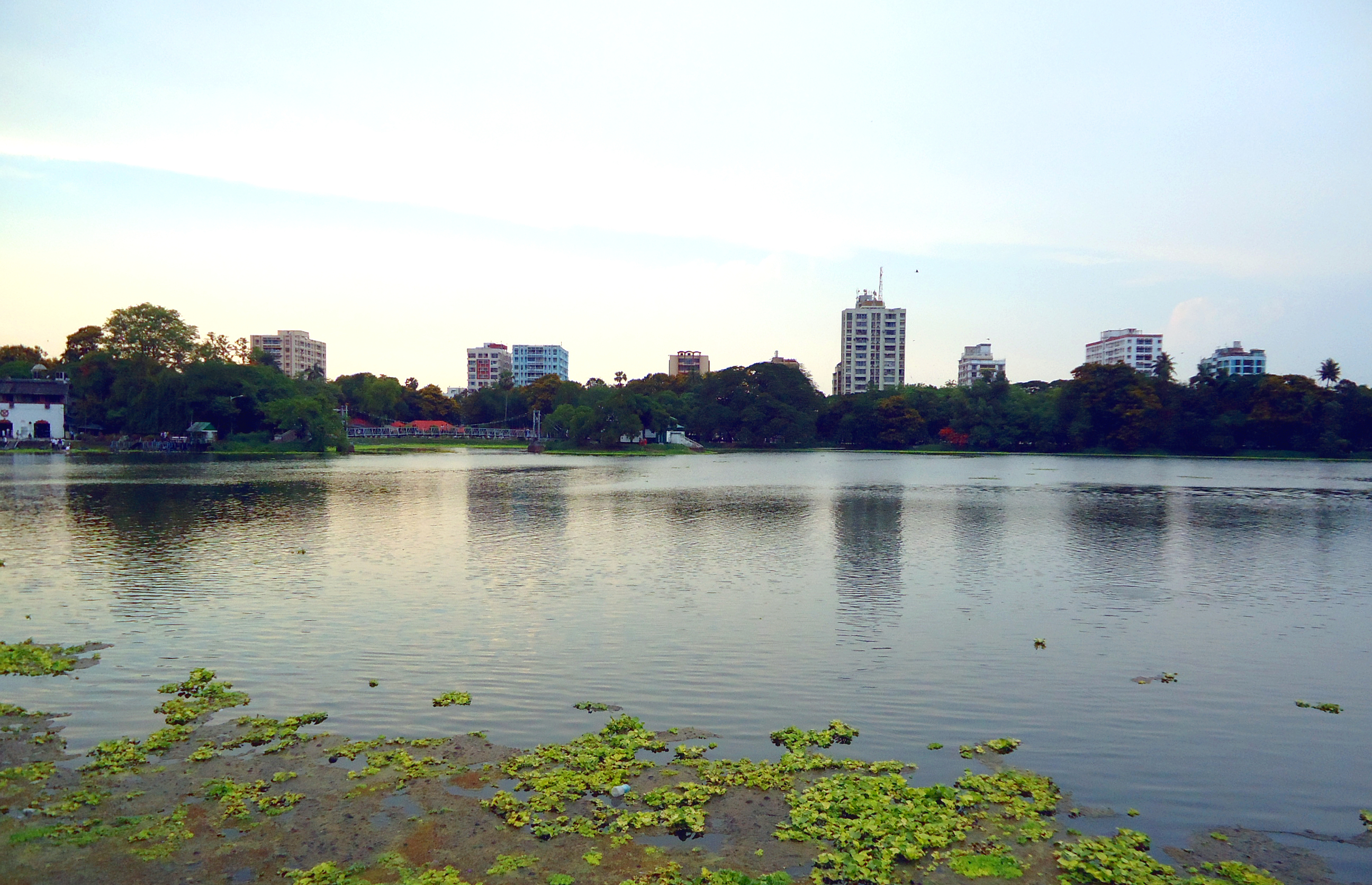
A view of Rabindra Sarobar in South Kolkata

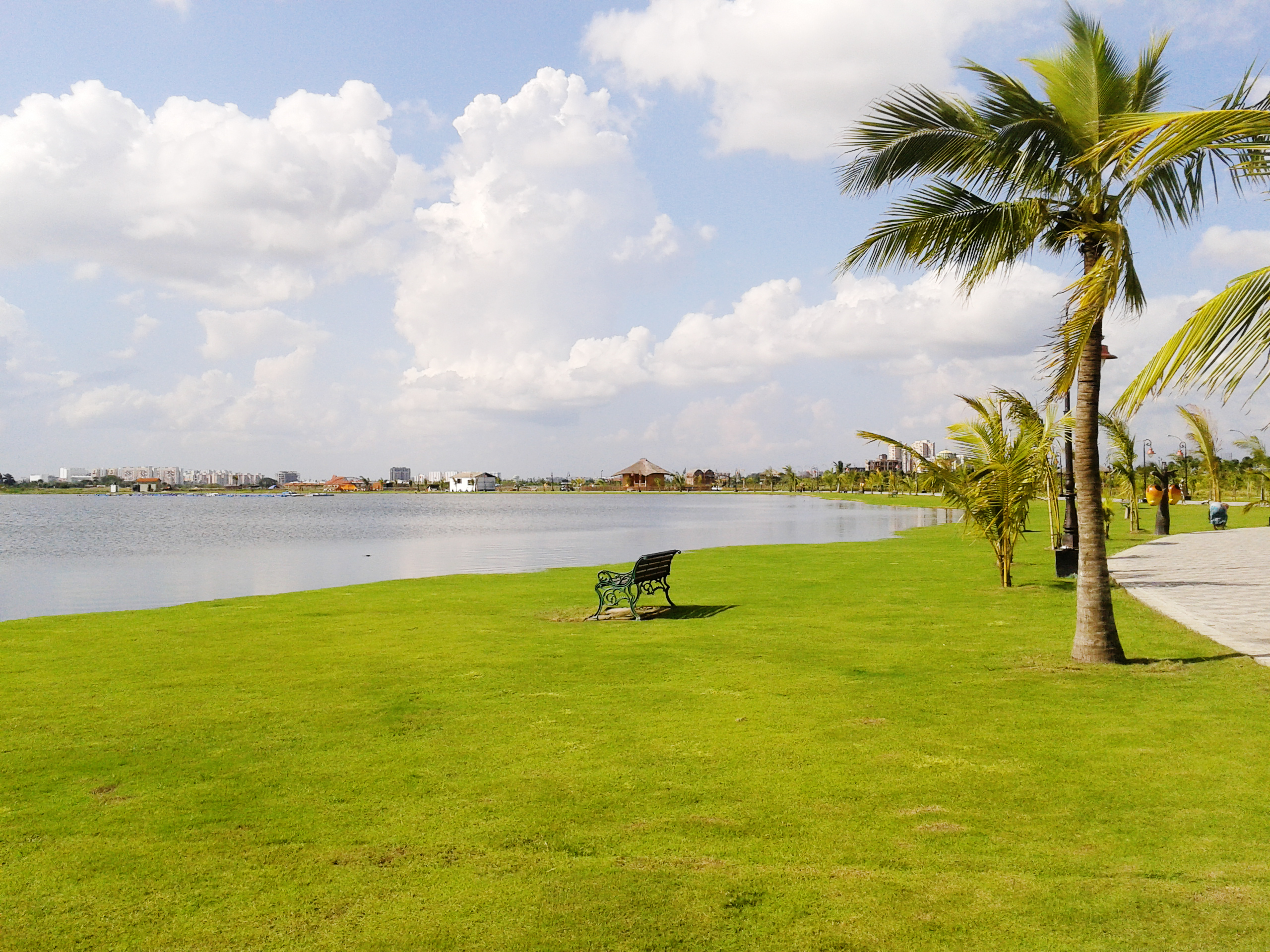
Lush green grass along the lake at New Town Eco Park

The Central Park is a large urban park in the centre of the Bidhan Nagar township in Kolkata Metropolitan Area, with a lake in the middle and information technology and government offices along its fringes.

Prakriti Tirtha or 'Eco Park', located in New Town in Kolkata Metropolitan Area, is situated on a 480 acres (190 ha) plot and is surrounded by a 104 acres (42 ha) waterbody with an island called Ekanto in the middle. The park has been divided into three broad parts; (1) ecological zones like wetlands, grasslands, and urban forest, (2) theme gardens and open spaces, and (3) urban recreational spaces. The Eco Park is further divided into different sub-parts according to the different types of fauna planted. Recently in the month of November 2017, it also opened up another section which displays the replica of "The seven wonders of the World". Toy trains and chair cars are available for the tourists on rent for making round around the park. There are four Gates for entry and exit purpose.

The Acharya Jagadish Chandra Bose Indian Botanic Garden (previously known as Indian Botanical Garden) spread over 270 acres (1.1 km^{2}), was founded in 1786 and is the oldest botanical gardens in India. It is located at the bank of Hoogly River, Shibpur, Howrah near Kolkata. Housing 50,000 species, the Botanical Survey of India and one of the world's most historically relevant herbariums, it is famous for its 250-year-old, 98-foot-tall The Great Banyan tree - which has the largest girth of any banyan tree ever recorded (1300 ft).

Alipore Zoological Gardens was founded in 1875, inaugurated by The Prince of Wales (later Edward VII). Initially started from the personal menagerie of the then Governor General of Bengal Arthur Wellesley and Carl Louis Schwendler - a German electrician, it grew based on gifts from British and Indian nobility - like Raja Suryakanta Acharya of Mymensingh in whose honour the open air tiger enclosure is named the "Mymensingh Enclosure". The zoo was ill-reputed because of cross breeding experiments between lions and tigers to produce strains like tigons, ligers, and litigons. Adwaita was a male Aldabra giant tortoise in the zoo who died in March 2006. He was reported to have been more than 250 years old - a candidate for the longest-lived animal. The other success story of the zoo was a live birth of the rare Sumatran rhinoceros in 1889. The zoo is downsizing to meet animal comfort requirements laid down by the Central Zoo Authority of India. The zoo is also on the flyway for several migratory birds like the sarus crane.

A host of new amusement parks have sprung up in recent times - the most notable being are Nicco Park in Bidhan Nagar - the first modern amusement park in Kolkata Metropolitan Area and Aquatica in New Town - the theme water park. Other important parks include Nalban in Bidhannagar and Captain Bhery Eco & Aquatic Hub in Chingrighata.

Benubana Chhaya is a categorized water park in Kolkata located at Bishwa Bangla Sarani, Baishnabghata Patuli Township. The Nature Park of India is a reserved area administered by the government of India.

== Statues and memorials ==
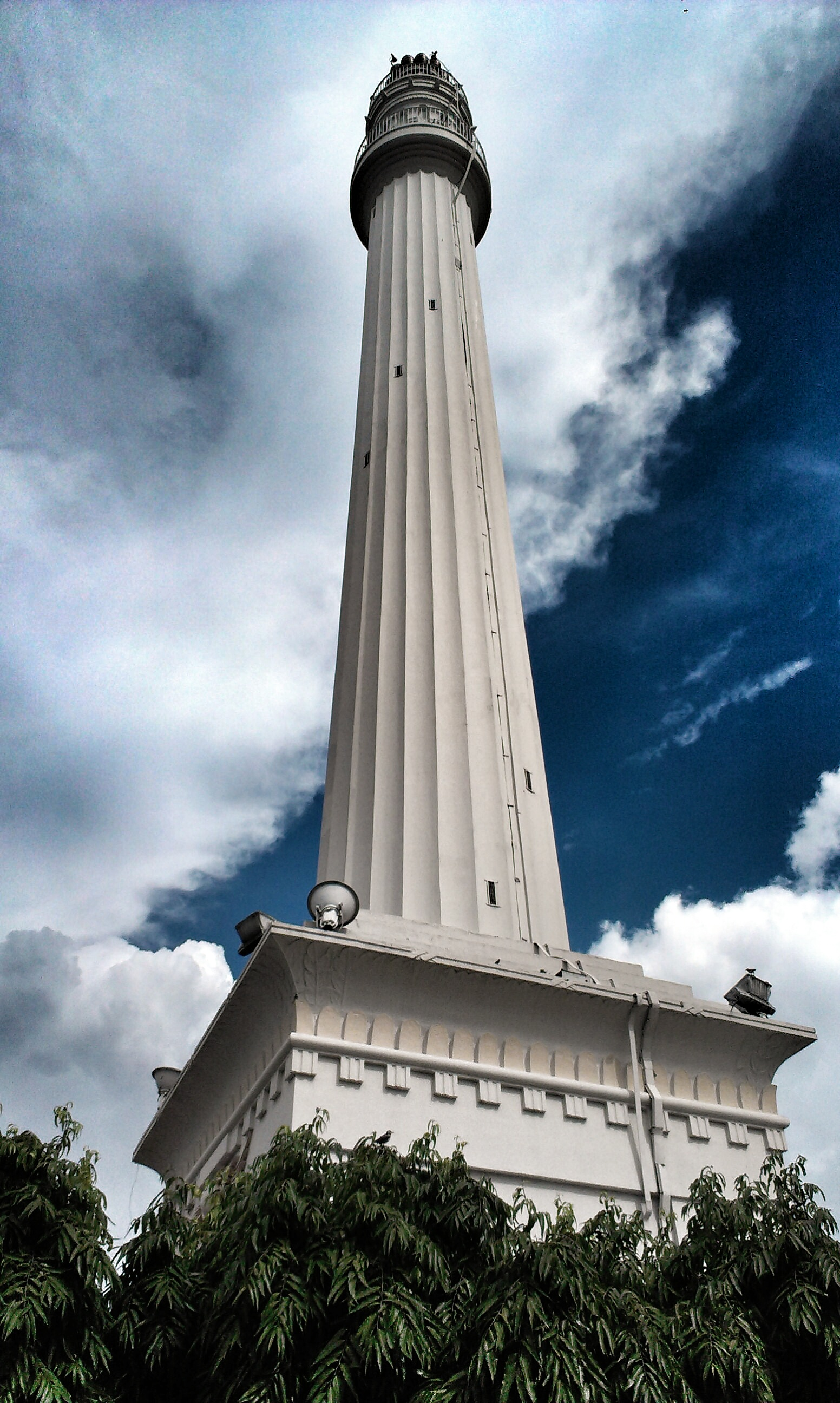
The Shaheed Minar or Ochterlony Monument, Kolkata

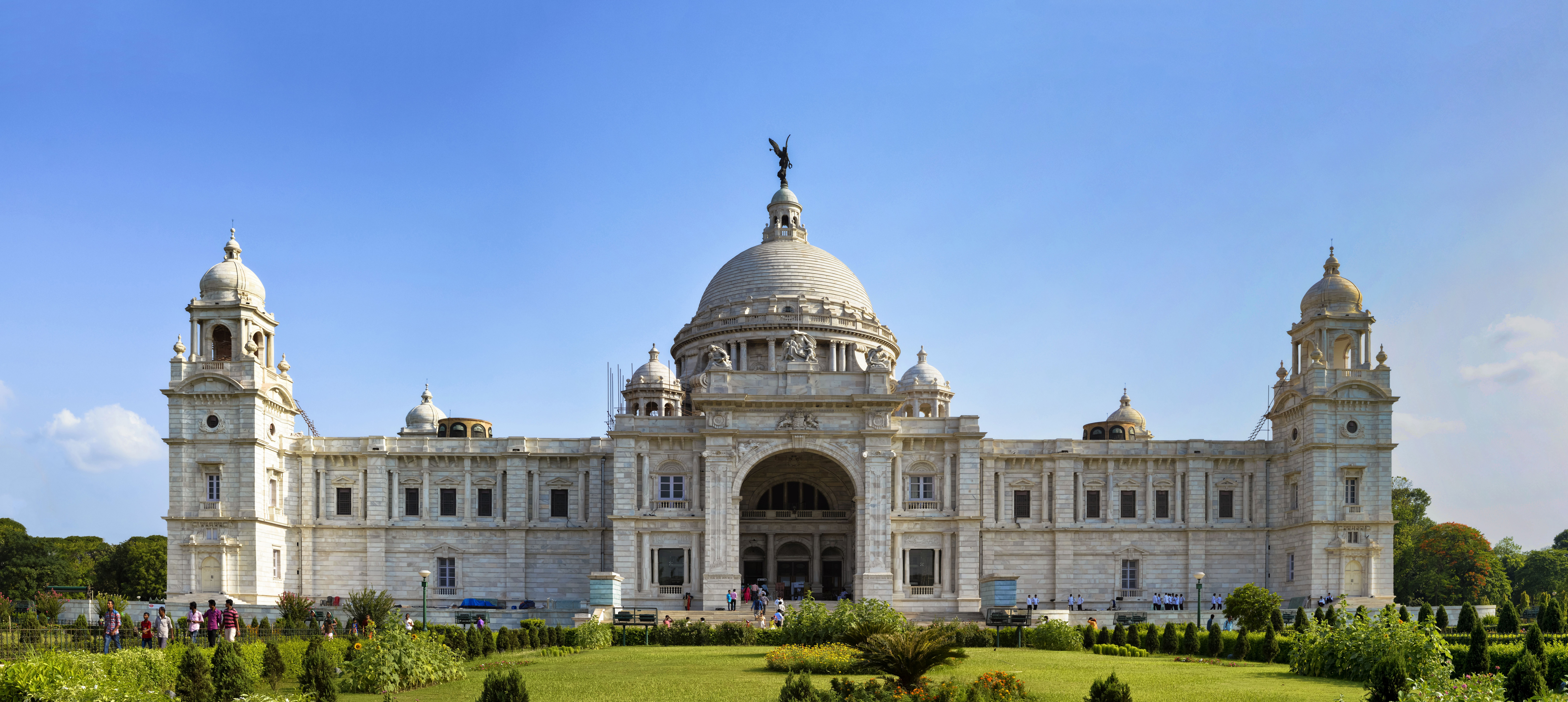
The Victoria Memorial

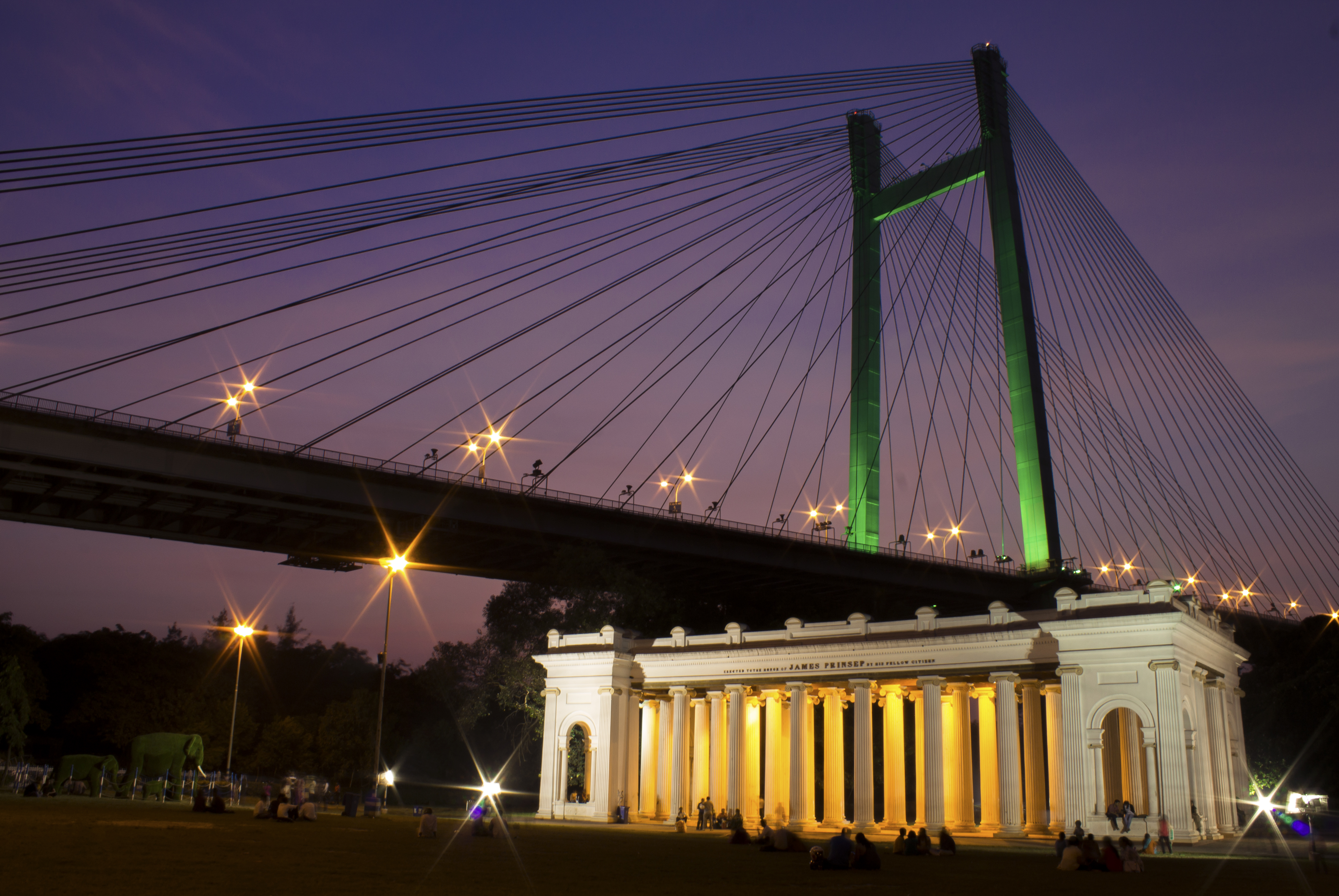
A view of Prinsep Ghat in the evening

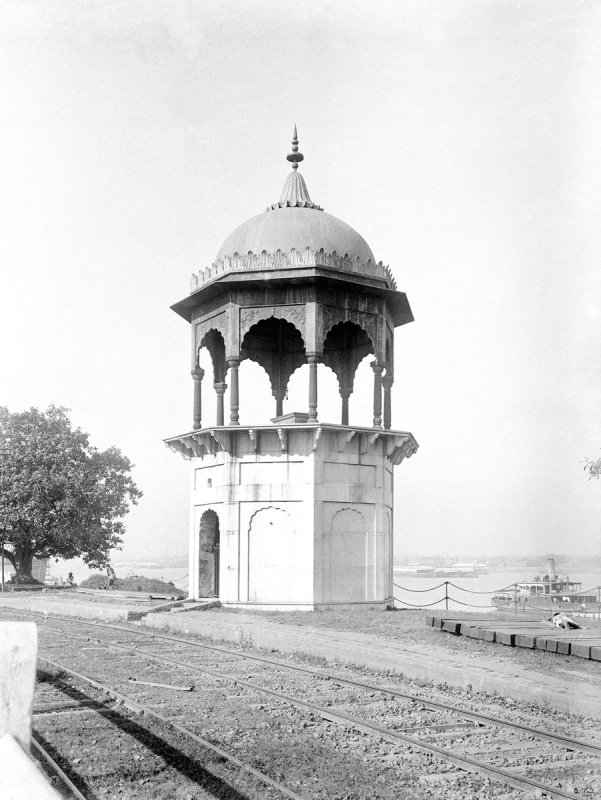
Gwalior Monument

The Shaheed Minar or "Tower of the Martyrs", (formerly Ochterlony Monument) was constructed on the northern fringe of the Maidan in honour of Sir David Ochterlony who commanded the British East India Company forces in the Gurkha War (1814–1816). It was renamed Shaheed Minar in honor of the fallen freedom fighters after Indian independence.

Situated at Prinsep Ghat, is a Palladian porch in the memory of the eminent Anglo-Indian scholar and antiquary James Prinsep was designed by W. Fitzgerald and constructed in 1843.Located between the Water Gate and the St George's Gate of the Fort William, the monument to Prinsep is rich in Greek and Gothic inlays. It was restored by the state's public works department in November 2001 and has since been well-maintained. In its initial years, all royal British entourages used the Prinsep Ghat jetty for embarkation and disembarkation.

Other memorials in Kolkata include the Panioty fountain, McDonnell Drinking Fountain, Police Memorial and the William Jones obelisk at the South Park Street Cemetery. Lascar War Memorial located on the Napier Road in the Hastings area, is a memorial dedicated to the memory of 896 Lascars (sailor or militiaman from Indian subcontinent), who died fighting for the Royal Navy during the World War I. Gwalior Monument, also known as Ellenborough’s Folly is an octagonal cenotaph about 60 feet high, crowned with a bronze dome cast from guns captured from the Marathas. It was erected in 1847 by Lord Ellenborough, the Governor-General of India, as a memorial to the officers and men who fell during the Gwalior War in 1843.

Kolkata has many statues celebrating British heritage and the Indian Renaissance and freedom movement. The Maidan is a particularly good place for statue-hunting. A few of the more notable landmarks are as follows:

- The statue of Subhas Chandra Bose, by Marathi sculptor Nagesh Yoglekar is located at the Shyambazar five-point crossing.
- The statue of Sir James Outram, by Irish sculptor John Henry Foley, built in 1874, is located in front of the Victoria Memorial originally at the Mother Teresa Sarani and Chowringhee Avenue crossing.
- The statue of Iswarchandra Vidyasagar, by Bengali sculptor Pramod Gopal Chattopadhyay, built in 1899, is located on the premises of Sanskrit College.
- The statue of Rabindranath Tagore by Soviet Belarusian sculptor of Jewish origin Zair Azgur, built in 1963, is located at the premises of Jorasanko Thakur Bari, the Tagore family residence.
- The statue of David Hare was built in 1847. It is one of Kolkata's few marble statues, on the precincts of Presidency University.
- Besides, the statue of the celebrated Bengali film star Uttam Kumar stands at the Deshapran Sashmal Road.
- The statue of Karl Marx near Maidan.
- Bengali War Memorial, located at Vidyasagar Udyan, is a war memorial dedicated to the fallen soldiers of 49th Bengali Regiment, the only British Indian Army regiment to consist entirely of ethnic Bengalis, who served in World War I.

== Sports venues ==
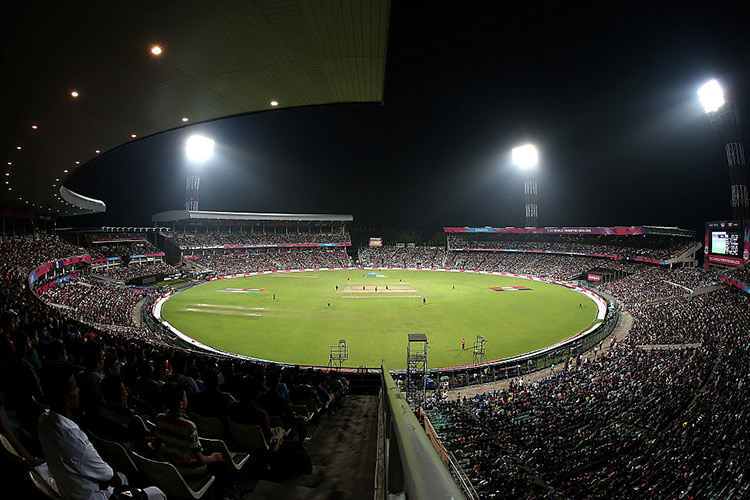
Eden Gardens Cricket Stadium

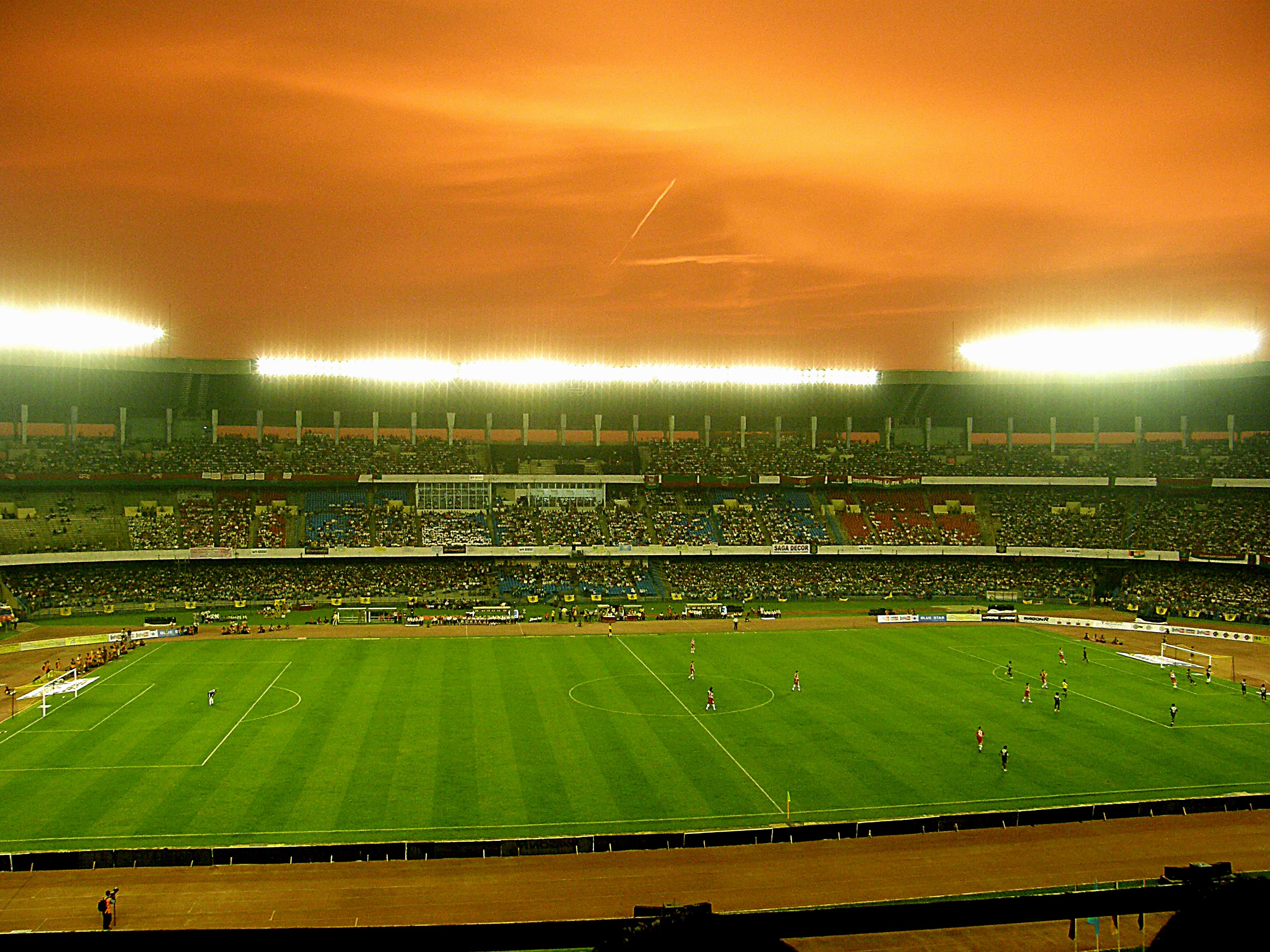
Salt Lake Stadium, Kolkata

- Eden Gardens is one of only two 100,000 seater amphitheatres for the game of cricket (the other being Melbourne Cricket Ground). It was initially an extension of the Maidan under the supervision of Governor General Lord Auckland, and looked after by the Eden sisters of the Auckland family. The gardens house a transported Burmese pagoda of exquisite design. The pavilion was built in 1871 and the 1st first class match played in the season of 1911-12. It has since hosted many international Test matches, one day matches and tournaments, including the final of the Cricket World Cup in 1987. Its exalted status in cricketing history comes from the lush outfield, stellar performances (like V.V.S. Laxman's 281), and not least the intense crowd support. The stadium has a history of crowd violence - involving riots in the stands in 1967 (when the stadium burnt), 1996 and 1999.
- Yuva Bharati Krirangan, also called the Salt Lake Stadium, is a 122,000 - strong amphitheatre used for soccer matches and concerts. It is purposely not a home stadium for any soccer team. It hosted the bulk of the 3rd South Asian Federation Games in Kolkata in 1987.
- The Netaji Indoor Stadium, adjacent to the Eden Gardens, is a 12,000 seater air-conditioned indoor stadium, having hosted internationally significant events like the state funeral of Mother Teresa in 1997. Constructed in 1975 to host the World Table Tennis Championships, it also has the Kshudiram Anusilani Kendra - a smaller auditorium without gallery facilities for training purposes.
- The Calcutta Cricket and Football Club (originally the Calcutta Cricket Club) is the second oldest cricket club in the world, after the Marylebone Cricket Club. Founded in 1792 as the Calcutta Cricket Club, it merged later with the Calcutta Football Club (founded 1872) to become the Calcutta Cricket and Football Club, and is located on Gurusaday Dutta Road. It has arguably the most picturesque cricket ground in Kolkata. Recent evidence in the form of an article in Hickey's Bengal Gazette, suggests the club existed in 1780 - which would make it the oldest cricket club in the world.
- The Royal Calcutta Turf Club is the oldest turf club in India, and one of the most beautiful and largest in the world. Encompassing a significant area of the Maidan, it was founded in 1847, and is distinguished for its "Monsoon Track" - one of the fastest draining tracks in the world. It was conferred the epithet "Royal" by George V in 1912.
- Kolkata is one of the few cities in the world to boast of three beautiful 18 holes golf courses within city limits - at the Royal Calcutta Golf Club, Tollygunj Club and Fort William. The Royal Calcutta Golf Club, founded in 1829, is the oldest golf club outside the British Isles. It was variously located in Dum Dum and Maidan, but finally settled down in Tollygunj and was conferred the epithet "Royal' by George V at the Delhi Durbar in 1911.
- Kolkata is home to the world's oldest active polo club, the Calcutta Polo Club. Situated on the Maidan, the club was founded in 1862 and is the second oldest polo club in the world. Kolkata has yet another polo club in the Fort William Polo Club. The CPC polo grounds are located in the maidan and maintained jointly with the RCTC.
- Mohun Bagan Athletic Club, located in the Maidan area of Kolkata, is one of the oldest sporting institutions in the country. It was founded on 15 August 1889 and is one of India's top football clubs. The club is also known for its exploits in cricket, hockey, tennis, and athletics. Mohun Bagan club was also associated with India's freedom struggle.
- Kolkata is also home to one of the oldest squash and rackets clubs in the world - the Calcutta Racket Club, founded in 1793.
- South Club, established in 1920, has beautiful tennis courts and has been the venue for Davis Cup matches.
- Rabindra Sarobar is the home and pool for the rowing clubs of Lake Club, Bengal Rowing Club and Calcutta Rowing Club.

== Markets and malls ==
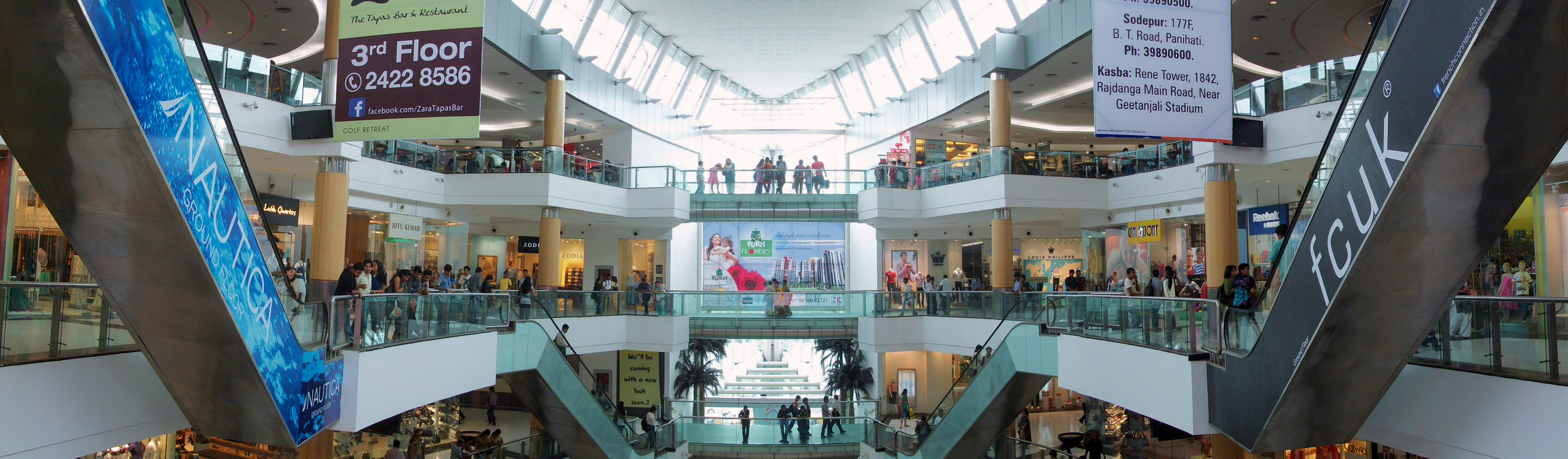
South City Mall Interior

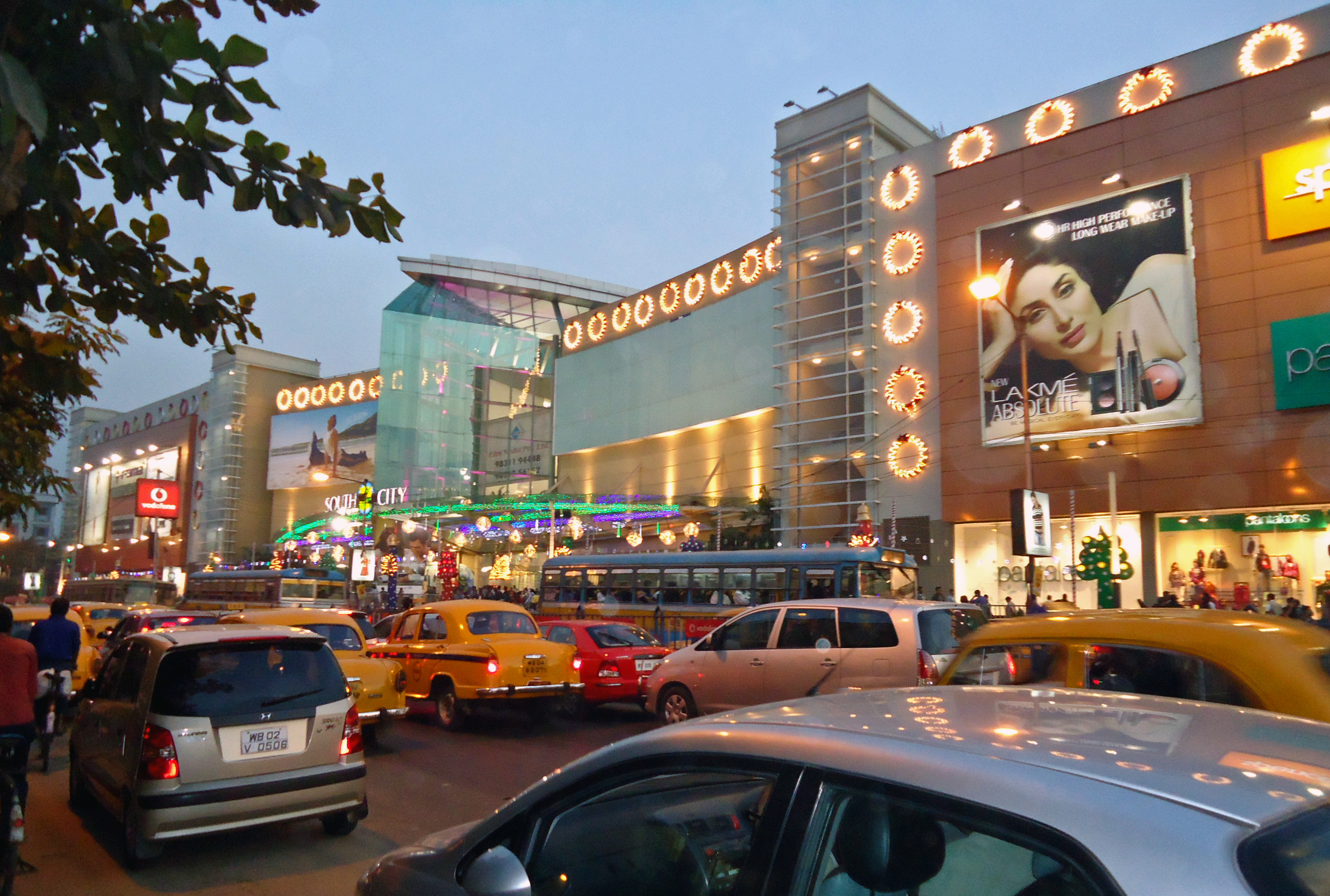
South City Mall, biggest mall of Kolkata

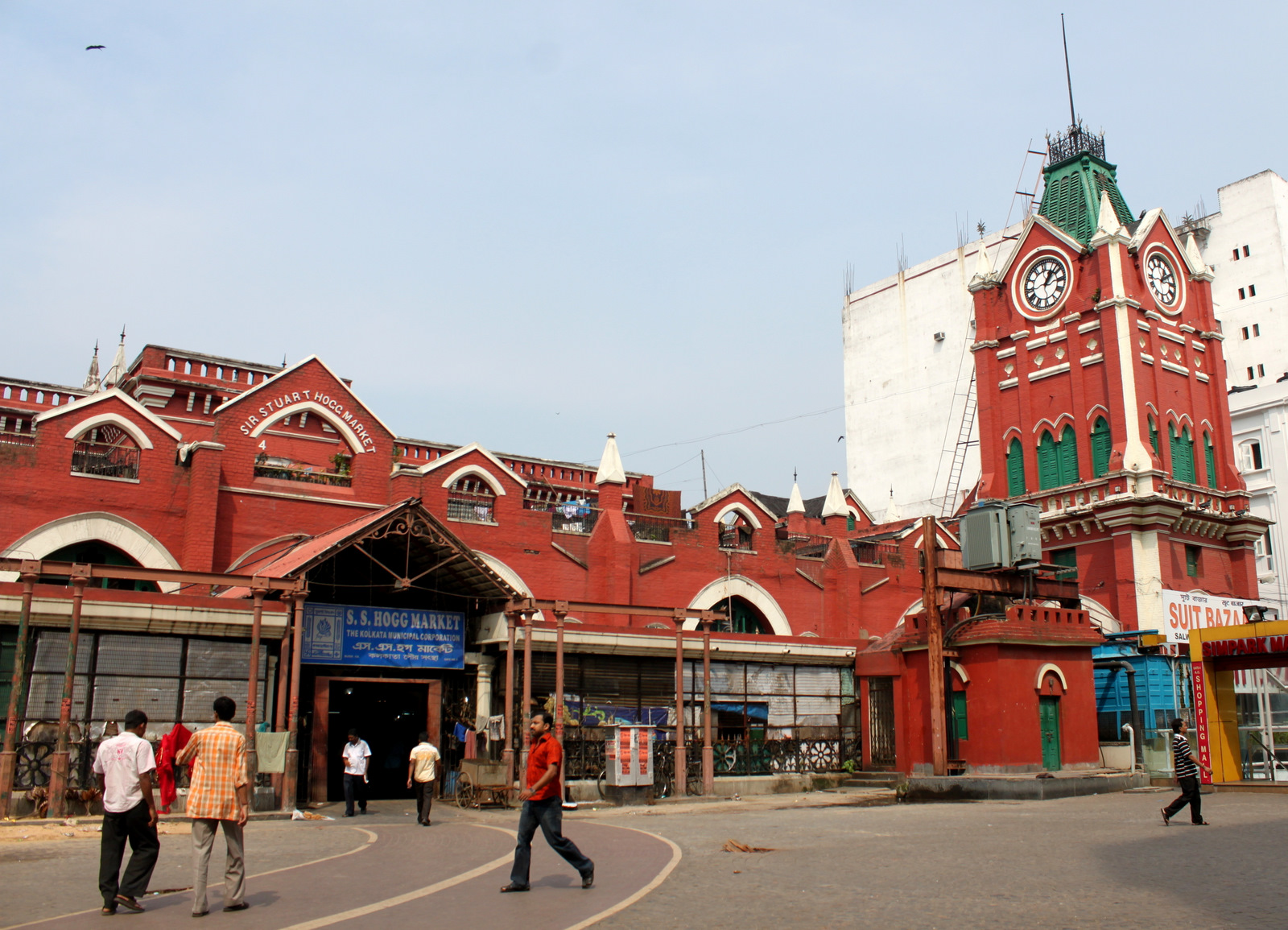
Sir Stuart Hogg Market (New Market), Kolkata

New Market is Kolkata's historic shopping district. Opened in 1874, it was named Hogg Market after the commissioner Sir Stuart Hogg. The beautiful fountain and benches at the market no longer exist, but the popularity of the market has not waned, and the beautiful gothic clock tower recalls the British heritage of the market. It was renamed New Market after Independence. New Market led the way for Christmas and New Year festivities with confectionery shops like Nahoum's putting up a special spread. The market is organized on the basis of merchandise. It burnt down partially in 1985 but has been restored and expanded with a new building which houses very famous Kashmir Handicraft store-Pumposh.

The Mother Teresa Sarani, Abanindra Nath Tagore Sarani and Shakespeare Sarani are considered to be a high street of Kolkata with many commercial establishments and shopping complexes, boutiques, restaurants and stand-alone retail outlets. Gariahat and Shyambazar are two shopping districts catering mostly to the middle class and lower middle class of Kolkata. College Street is an area famous for its bookstores.

Kolkata has seen a spurt of shopping malls with the rise of the buying power of the Kolkata populace. Shopping arcades like Forum Mall and Emami Shoppers' City in Central Calcutta have brought international brands from Swarovski to Godiva to the city, breaking the city's dependence on the older market complexes like A.C. Market, Dakshinapan shopping center and Vardaan Market, which were mainly Chinese import dependent.

Most of the new malls in Kolkata are located in the newer developed areas like Bidhan Nagar, New Town and along the Bishwa Bangla Sarani. Some of the popular malls in Kolkata are City Centre (Bidhan Nagar), City Centre 2, Axis Mall and Home Town (New Town), South City Mall (the biggest mall in Eastern India) (Jadavpur), Acropolis Mall (Rajdanga in Kasba / East Kolkata Township), Metropolis Mall (Hiland Park), Mani Square Mall (Kankurgachi). Swabhumi has been modeled as an ethnic shopping arcade near the Bishwa Bangla Sarani in Phoolbagan. A new luxury shopping mall, Quest Mall has been opened in Park Circus by the RP-Sanjiv Goenka Group, which has brought many foreign brands such as Breitling, Burberry and Gucci for the first time to Kolkata.

== Places of worship ==
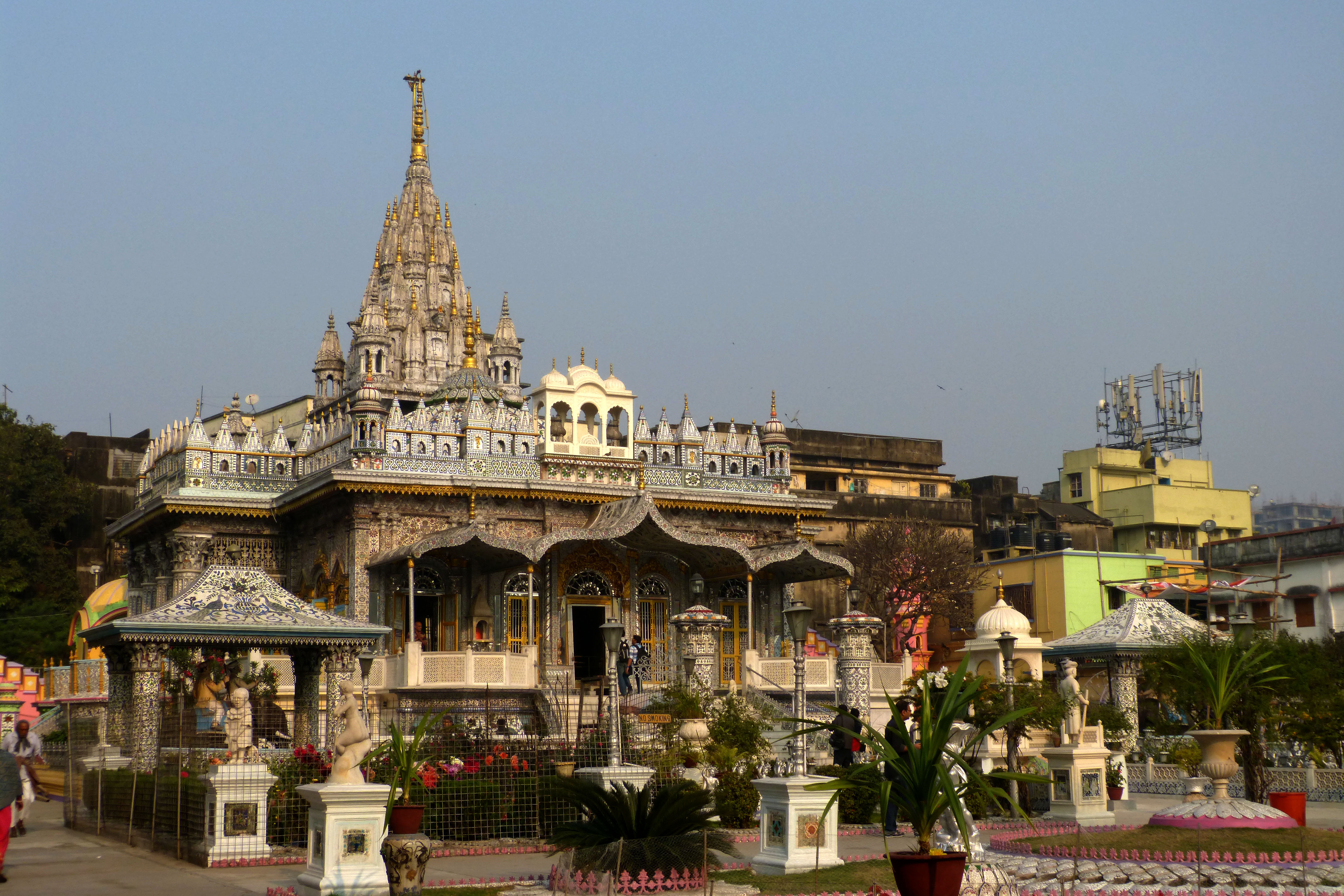
Badridas Jain Temple

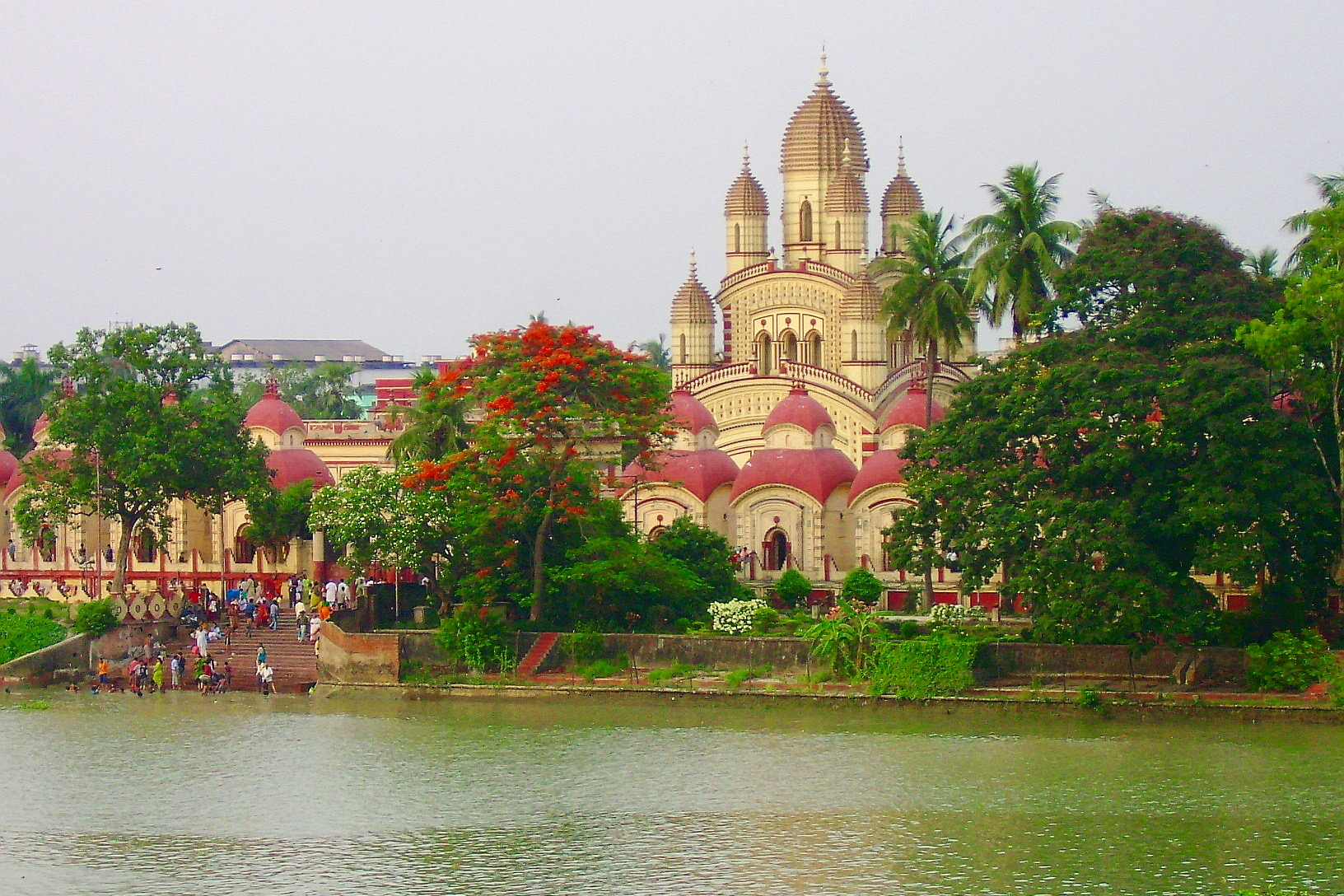
Dakshineswar Kali Temple

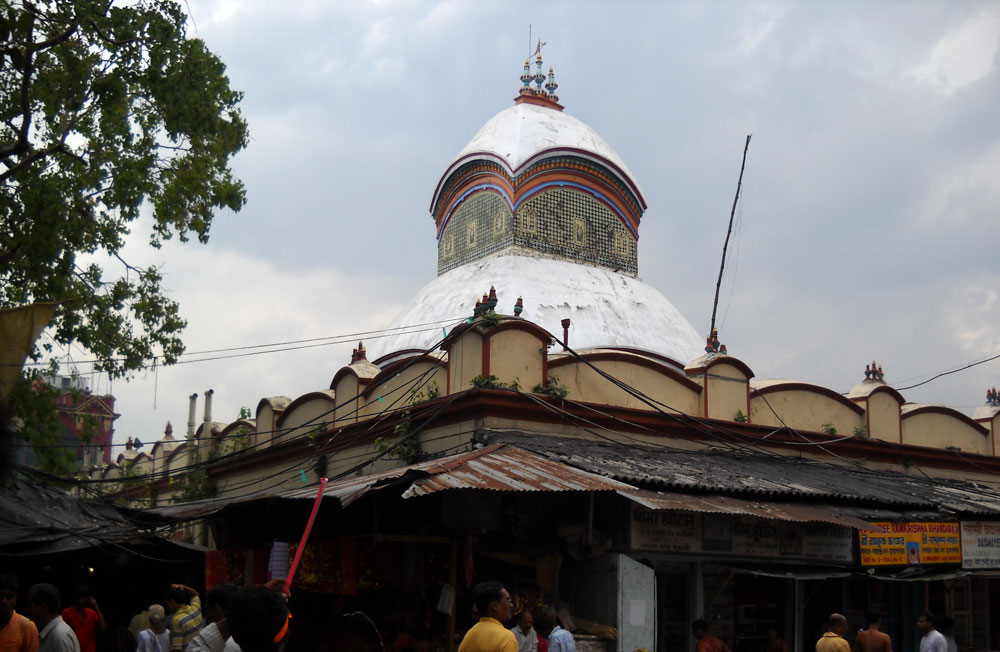
Kalighat Kali Temple

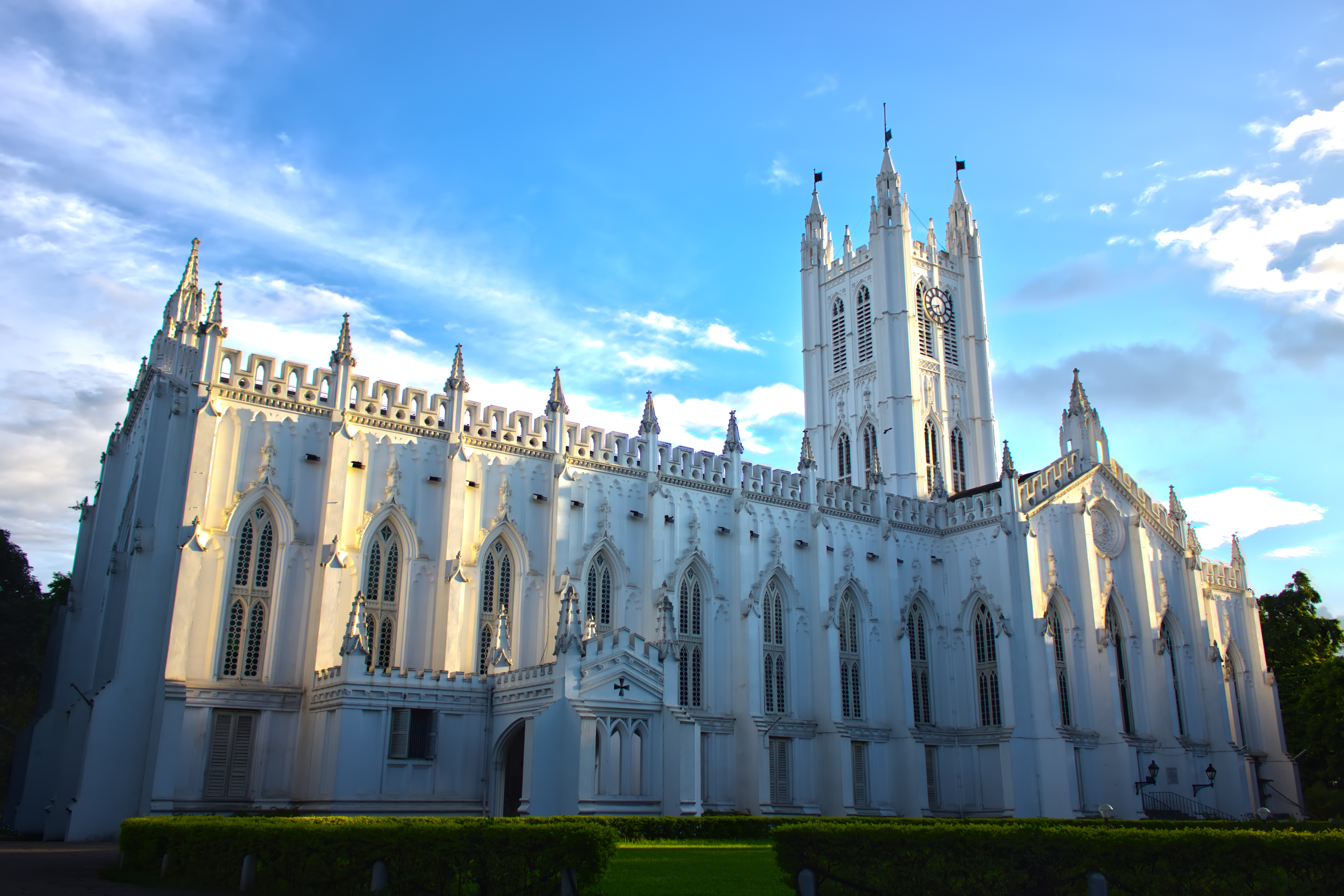
St. Paul’s Cathedral, Kolkata

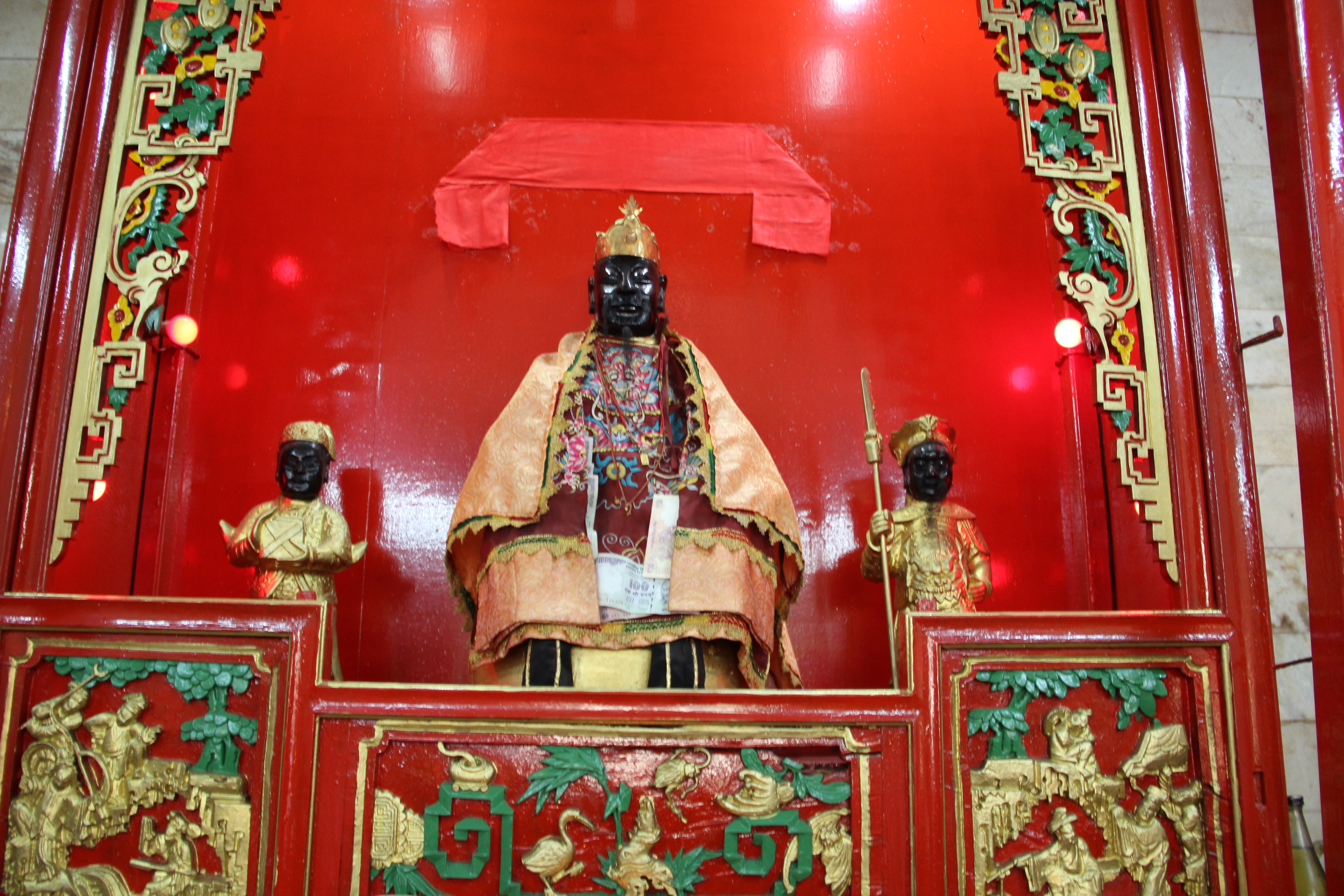
Deity in Nam Soon Church, a temple devoted to Chinese folk religion god

=== Temples ===
- Alambazar Math
- Baranagar Math
- Belur Math
- Birla temple
- Dakshineswar Kali Temple
- Dwadash Shiva Temples
- Firinghi Kalibari
- Kalighat Kali Temple
- Kripamayee Kali Temple
- Lake Kalibari
- Badridas Jain Temple
- Pathbari Temple, Baranagar
- Thanthania Kalibari

=== Mosques ===
- Nakhoda Masjid
- Tipu Sultan Masjid Tollygunge
- Tipu Sultan Mosque

=== Churches ===
- Armenian Church of the Holy Nazareth
- Cathedral of the Most Holy Rosary (Portuguese Church)
- Church of the Lord Jesus
- St. James' Church, Kolkata (Jora Girja)
- St. John's Church
- St. Paul’s Cathedral

=== Other religious establishments ===
- Chinese temples in Kolkata
- Magen David Synagogue

== Bridges ==
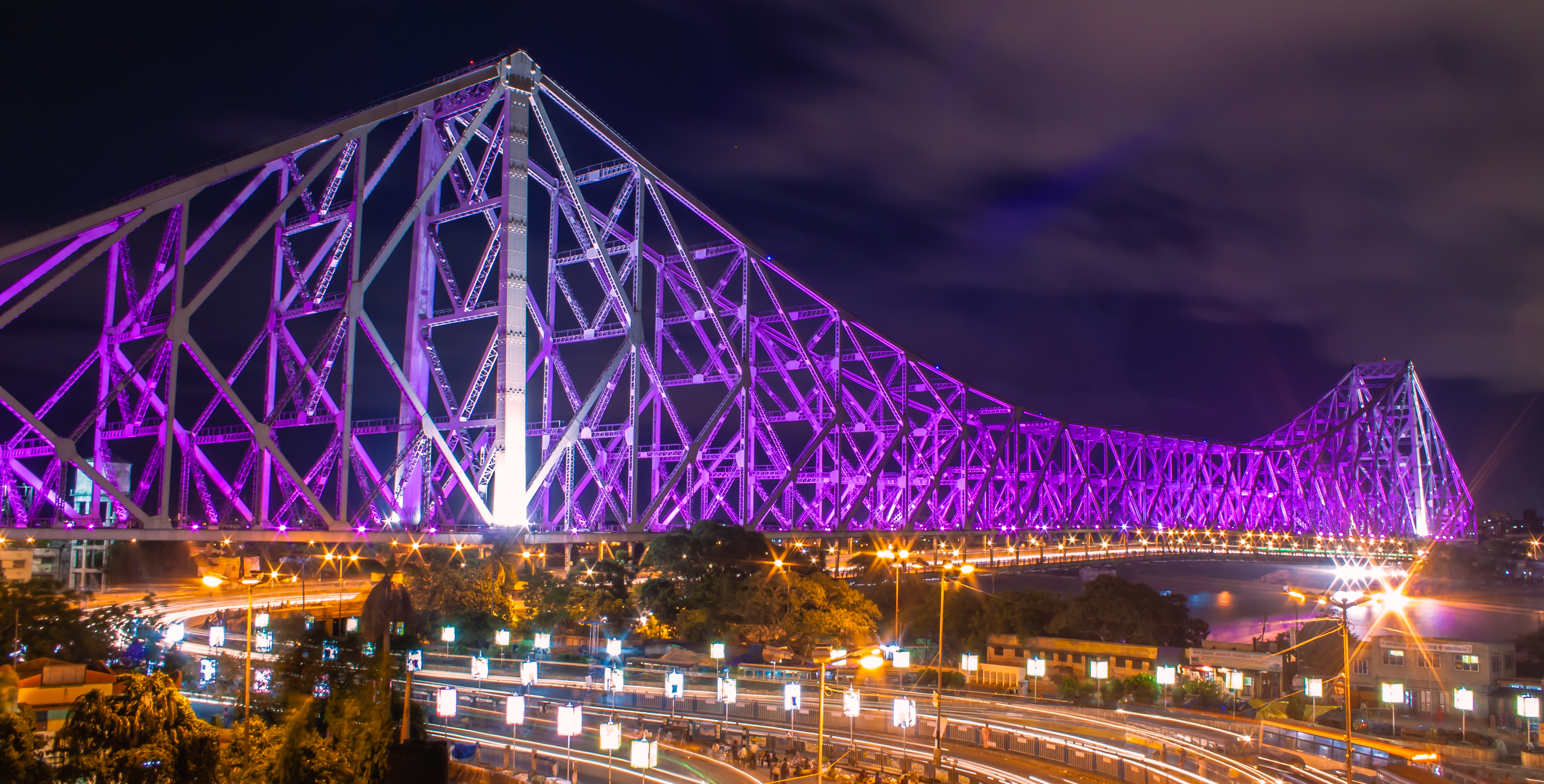
Howrah Bridge at night

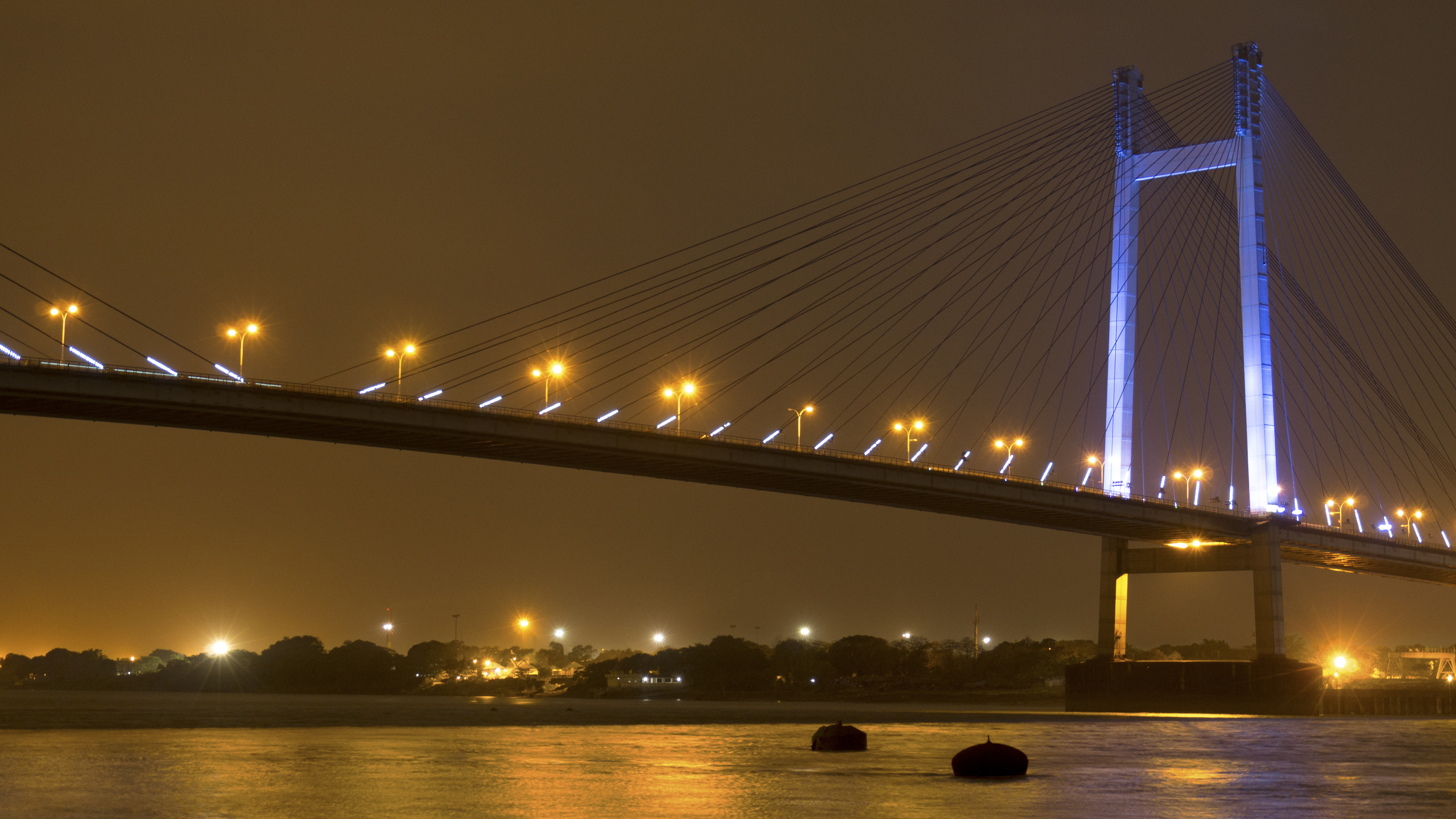
Second Hooghly Bridge shot at night from Prinsep Ghat

Mentioned below are some of the famous bridges in the city of Kolkata:

- Rabindra Setu (Howrah Bridge): The Howrah Bridge is a suspension type balanced cantilever bridge commissioned in 1943 and is a famous symbol of Kolkata and West Bengal.
- Vidyasagar Setu (Second Hooghly Bridge): Commissioned in 1992, it is the longest cable-stayed bridge in India and one of the longest in Asia connecting Kolkata with Howrah.
- Vivekananda Setu (Bally Bridge): Built in December 1932, it is a multi-span steel bridge and was built to provide road cum rail link between the Calcutta Port and its hinterland.
- Nivedita Setu (Second Bally Bridge): The bridge is the India's first multi-span, single-plane cable supported extra-dosed bridge and runs parallel to the Vivekananda Setu.

== Clubs ==
In Calcutta, the word "club" still means a watering hole and not a discothèque. Calcutta has a number of clubs that hark back to the Raj days but have modernised over time without sacrificing their traditions. Most clubs have bakeries, dining facilities and accommodation at reasonable prices. They also have reciprocal arrangements with clubs in different countries. The most noted clubs are:

- Bengal Club
- Calcutta Club
- The Calcutta Cricket and Football Club (CC&FC)
- Calcutta Rowing Club
- The Calcutta Swimming Club (CSC)
- Royal Calcutta Golf Club

== Other notable landmarks ==
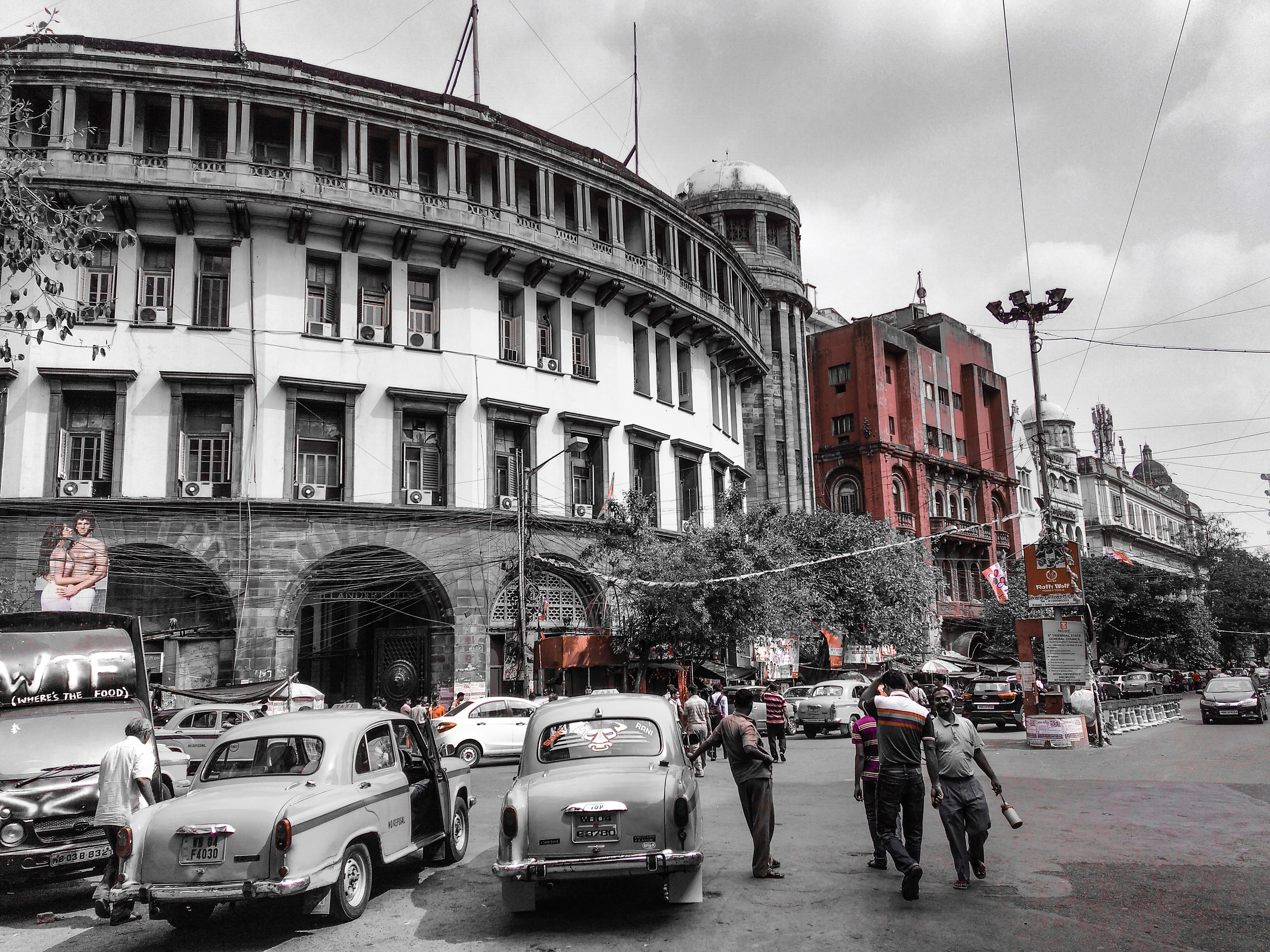
Gillander House

- Basu Bati
- Calcutta High Court
- Calcutta Medical College
- Fort William
- Futnani Chambers
- Kolkata General Post Office
- Metropolitan Building
- Nizam Palace
- Raj Bhavan
- Raja Subodh Mullick's house
- The Russell Exchange
- Sealdah Station
- Shobhabazar Rajbari
- St. Paul’s Cathedral
- Writers' Building

== Educational institutes of academic and historical interest ==
- Asiatic Society
- Calcutta Medical College
- IPGMER and Seth Sukhlal Karnani Medical College & Hospital
- Hare School
- Hindu School
- Indian Institute of Engineering Science and Technology, Shibpur
- Indian Institute of Management Calcutta
- Indian Statistical Institute, Baranagar
- Jadavpur University
- La Martiniere, Kolkata (Founded in 1836)
- Presidency University
- Rabindra Bharati University
- Scottish Church College
- St Thomas School, Kolkata (This is the oldest school in Kolkata being founded in 1789)
- St. Xavier's Collegiate School
- University of Calcutta

== Streets ==
- Abanindra Nath Tagore Sarani
- College Street
- Dr. Meghnad Saha Sarani
- Jawahar Lal Nehru Road
- Mirza Ghalib Street
- Mother Teresa Sarani
- Rajiv Gandhi Sarani
