= Calcutta Racket Club =

Indian squash and racquet club

Coordinates: 22.54508°N 88.34735°E

The Calcutta Racket Club is a squash and racquet club in Kolkata, India. It was founded in 1793, making it one of the oldest rackets clubs in the world, and the first in the subcontinent. Of its seven squash courts, two are glass-backed international standard tournament courts.

The Club is the administrative headquarters of The West Bengal Squash Racquet Association that is affiliated to the Squash Racket Federation of India. It has hosted the Kolkata International, an international squash tournament in 2005 and hosts all major squash activities and training in eastern India.
