= Geography of Kolkata =

Coordinates: 22.5726723°N 88.3638815°E

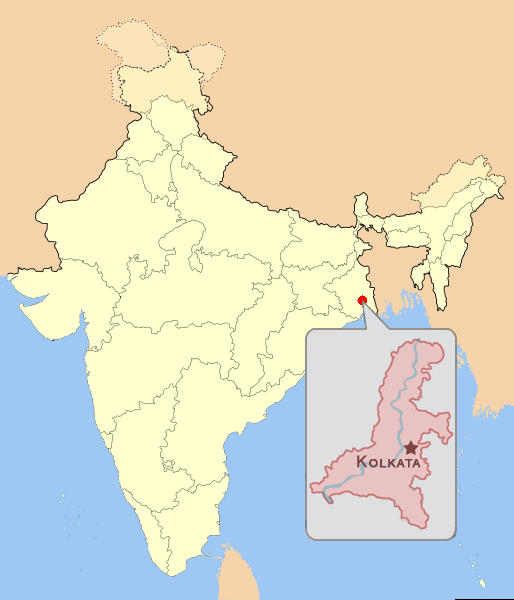
Location of Kolkata

Kolkata is located in the eastern part of India. It has spread linearly along the banks of the Hooghly River. The Kolkata Municipal Corporation has an area of 205 square kilometres. The city is near sea level, with the average elevation being 17 feet. The whole area is in the Ganges Delta which starts within 100 km south of the city. Most of the city was originally marshy wetlands, remnants of which can still be found especially towards the eastern parts of the city.

== Geology ==
Indo-Gangetic Plain, the soil and water are predominantly alluvial in origin. Kolkata is located over the "Bengal basin", a pericratonic tertiary basin. Bengal basin comprises three structural units: shelf or platform in the west; central hinge or shelf/slope break; and deep basinal part in the east and southeast. Kolkata is located atop the western part of the hinge zone which is about 25 km (16 mi) wide at a depth of about 45,000 m (148,000 ft) below the surface. The shelf and hinge zones have many faults, among them some are active. The total thickness of sediment below the Kolkata is nearly 7,500 m (24,600 ft) above the crystalline basement; of these the top 350–450 m (1,150–1,480 ft) is quaternary, followed by 4,500–5,500 m (14,760–18,040 ft) of tertiary sediments, 500–700 m (1,640–2,300 ft) trap wash of cretaceous trap and 600–800 m (1,970–2,620 ft) permian-carboniferous Gondwana rocks. The quaternary sediments consist of clay, silt, and several grades of sand and gravel. These sediments are sandwiched between two clay beds: the lower one at a depth of 250–650 m (820–2,130 ft); the upper one 10–40 m (30–130 ft) in thickness. According to the Bureau of Indian Standards, on a scale ranging from I to V in order of increasing susceptibility to earthquakes, the city lies inside seismic zone III.

== City geography ==
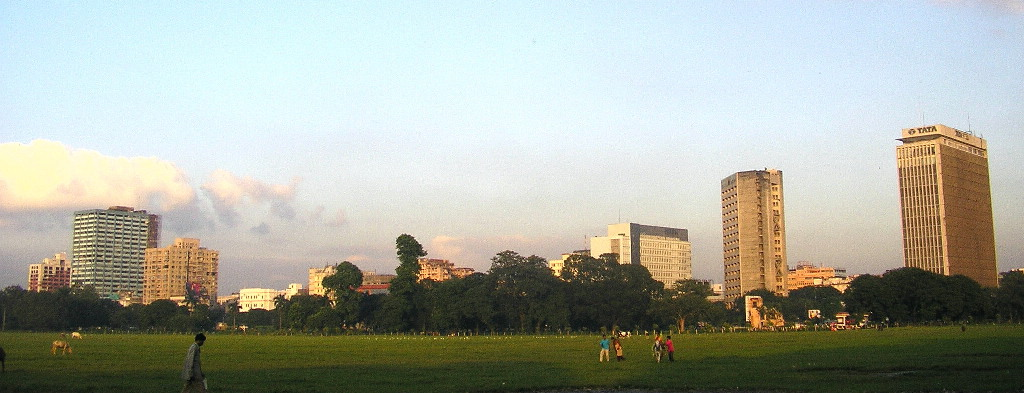
Kolkata — the skyline across the Maidan

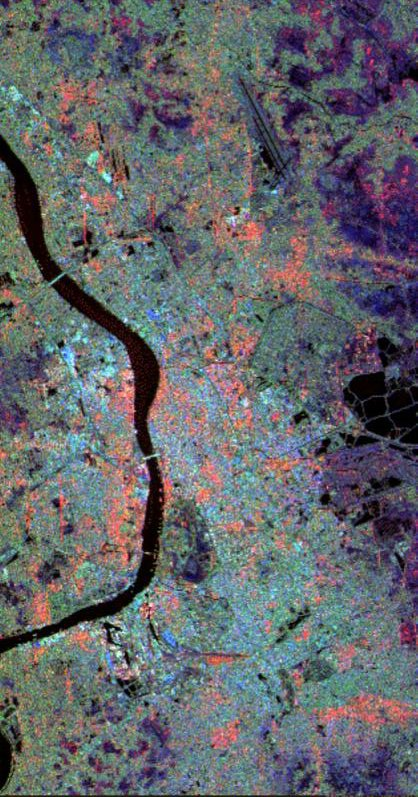
A satellite image of Kolkata showing land usage

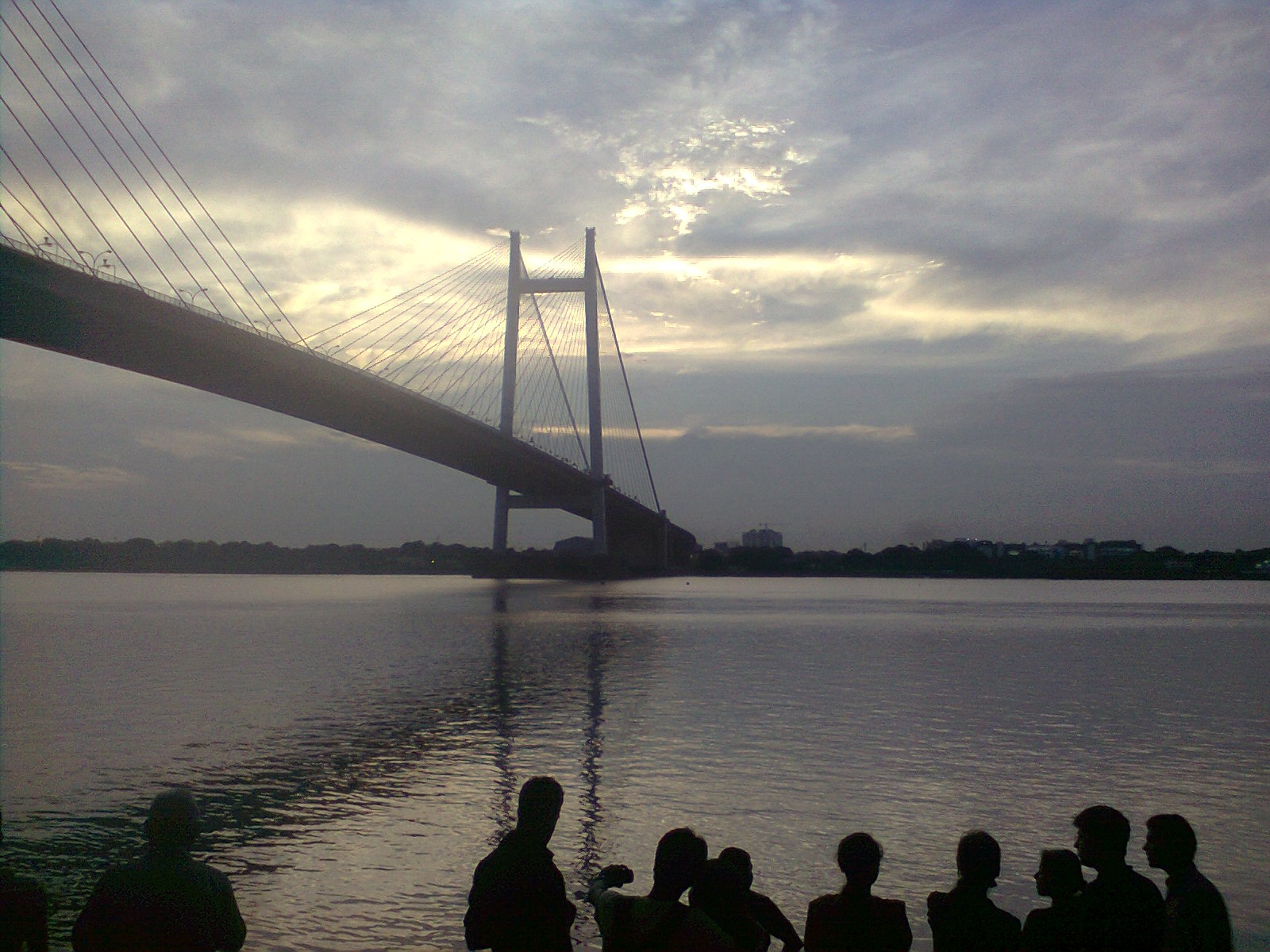
The Prinsep Ghat which is located on the bank of the Hoogly River

Spread roughly north–south along the east bank of the Hooghly River, Kolkata sits within the lower Ganges Delta of eastern India; the city's elevation is 1.5–9 m (5–30 ft). The city is fringed by extensive mangrove ecosystems and tidal flats.

=== Urban structure ===
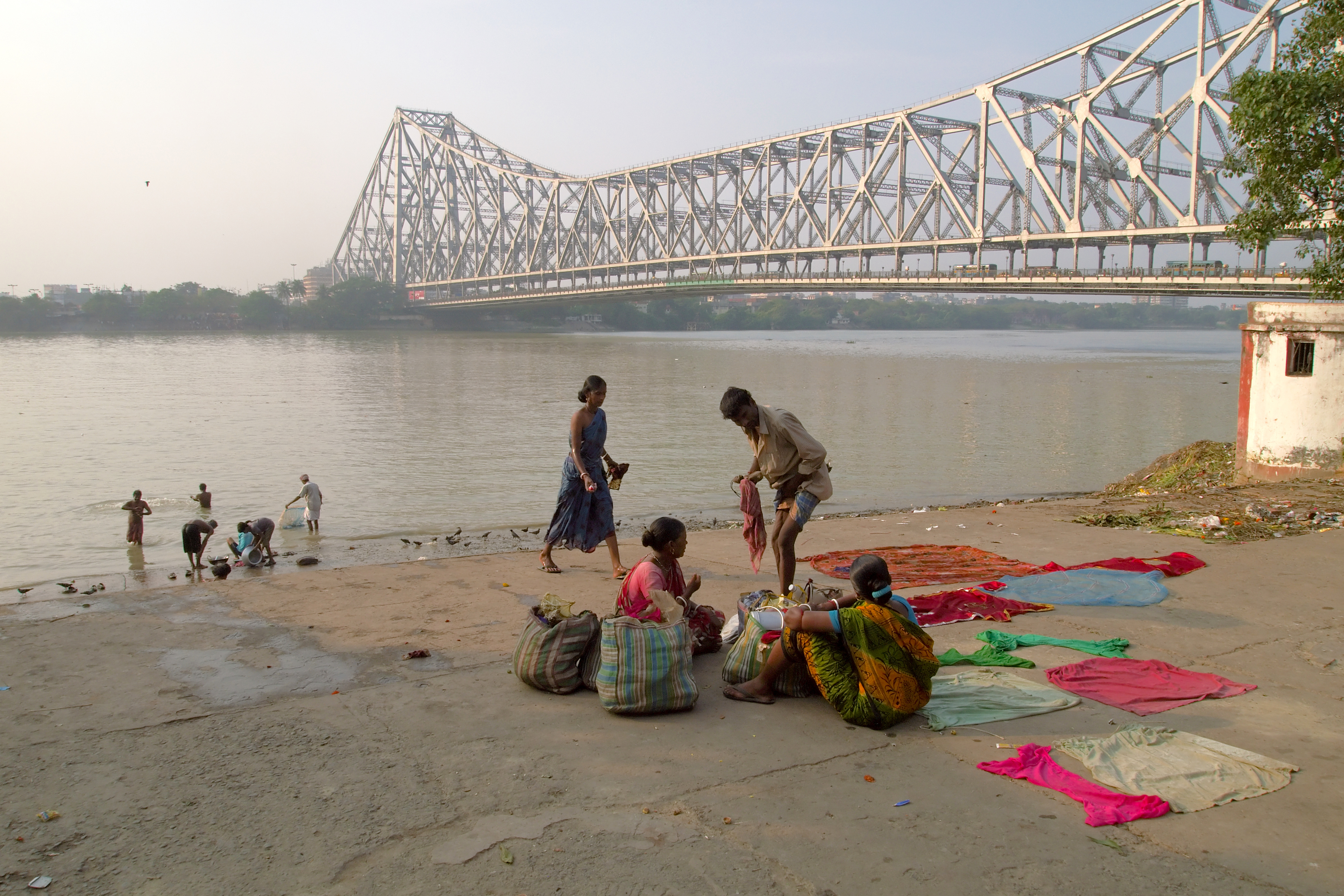
Howrah Bridge from the western bank of the Ganges

The Kolkata metropolitan area is spread over 1,886.67 km^{2} (728.45 sq mi) and comprises 4 municipal corporations (Kolkata Municipal Corporation, Bidhannagar Municipal Corporation, Howrah Municipal Corporation and Chandernagore Municipal Corporation), 37 local municipalities (Bally Municipality is merged with Howrah Municipal Corporation and Rajarhat-Gopalpur Municipality is merged with Bidhannagar Municipal Corporation, so total number of municipalities becomes 37 from 39) and 24 panchayat samitis.

The urban agglomeration encompassed 72 cities and 527 towns and villages, as of 2006. Suburban areas in the Kolkata metropolitan area incorporate parts of the following districts: Kolkata, North 24 Parganas, South 24 Parganas, Howrah, Hooghly and Nadia. Kolkata, which is under the jurisdiction of the Kolkata Municipal Corporation (KMC), has an area of 205 km^{2} (79 sq mi). The east–west dimension of the city is comparatively narrow, stretching from the Hooghly River in the west to roughly the Eastern Metropolitan Bypass in the east—a span of 9–10 km (5.6–6.2 mi). The north–south distance is greater, and its axis is used to section the city into North, Central and South Kolkata. East Kolkata is also a section.

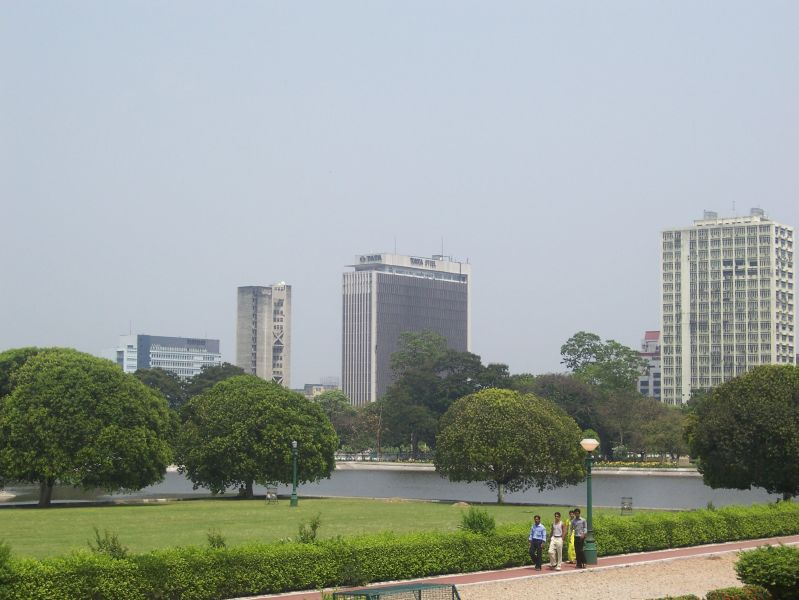
Kolkata skyline from Chowringhee

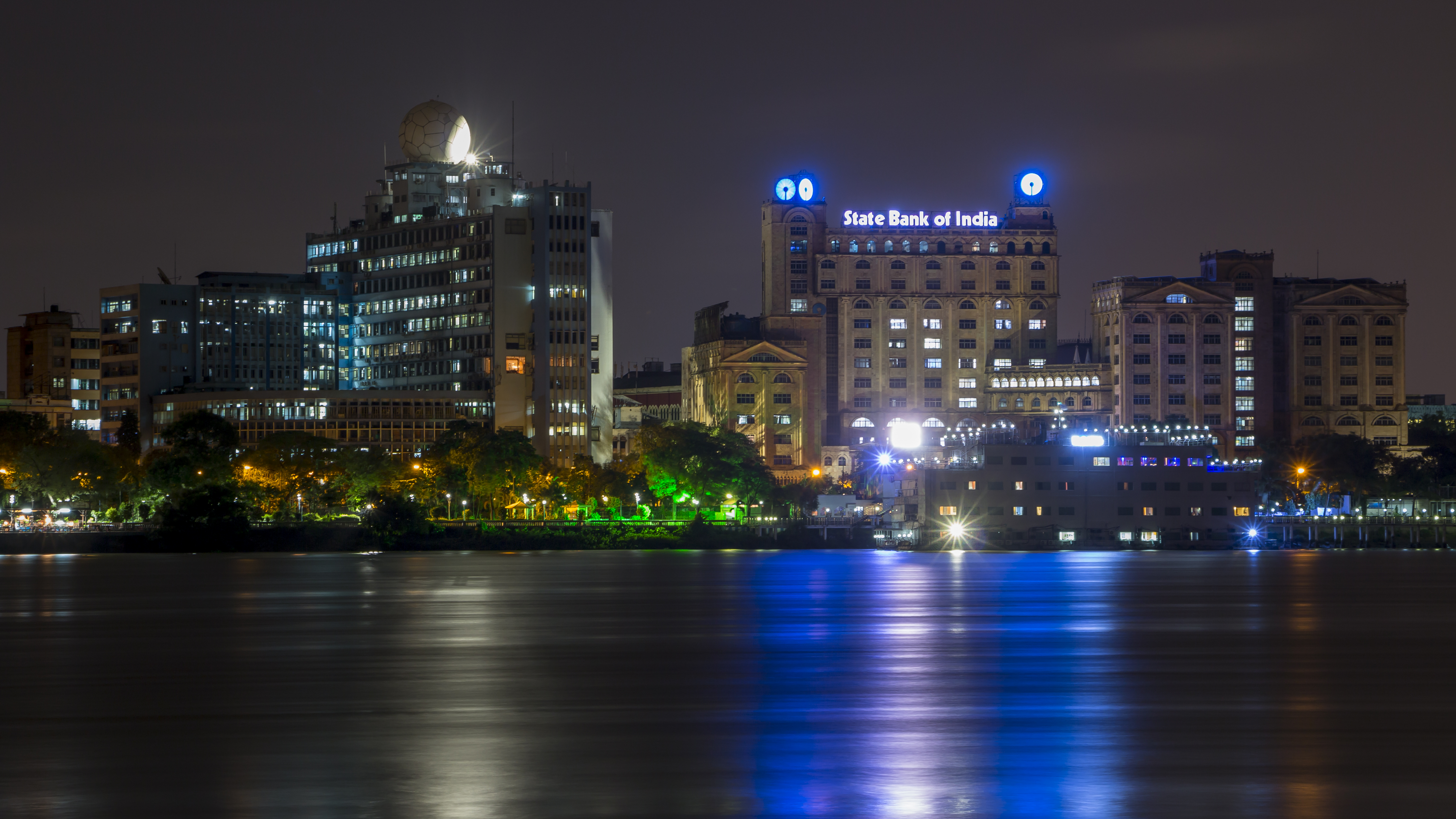
Kolkata riverfront at night

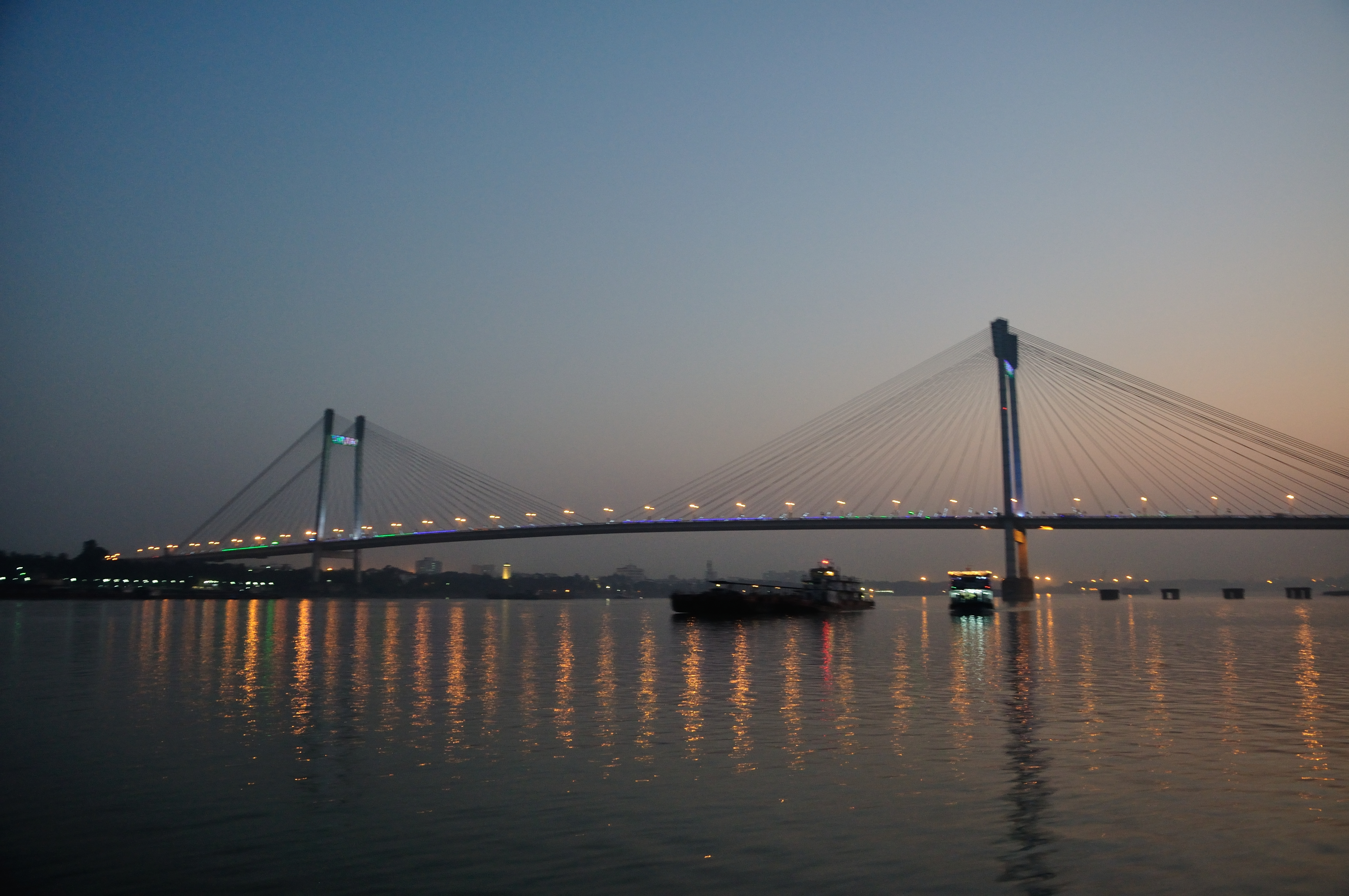
Vidyasagar Setu over the Hooghly River at dusk

==== North Kolkata ====
North Kolkata is the oldest part of the city. Characterised by 19th-century architecture, all include areas such as Dum Dum, Shyambazar, Hatibagan, Maniktala, Kankurgachi, Rajabazar, Shobhabazar, Shyampukur, Tala, Sonagachi, Kumortuli, Bagbazar, Jorabagan, Burrabazar, Jorasanko, Phoolbagan, Ultadanga, Chitpur, Nagerbazar, Lake Town, Bangur Avenue, Pathuriaghata, Cossipore, Belgachia, Sinthee Baranagar,Kamarhati, Belgharia, Agarpara, Sodepur, Panihati, Barrackpore, Khardaha and other parts of North 24 Parganas.

==== Central Kolkata ====
Central Kolkata hosts the central business district. It contains B. B. D. Bagh, formerly known as Dalhousie Square, and the Esplanade on its east; Strand Road is on its west. The West Bengal Secretariat, General Post Office, Reserve Bank of India, High Court, Lalbazar Police Headquarters, and several other government and private offices are located there. Another business hub is the area south of Park Street, which comprises thoroughfares such as Chowringhee, Camac Street, Wood Street, Loudon Street, Shakespeare Sarani and A. J. C. Bose Road. The Maidan is a large open field in the heart of the city that has been called the "lungs of Kolkata" and accommodates sporting events and public meetings. The Victoria Memorial and Kolkata Race Course are located at the southern end of the Maidan. Other important areas of Central Kolkata are Park Circus, Sealdah, Beliaghata, College Street, Burrabazar, Bowbazar, Taltala, Janbazar, Entally, Chandni Chowk, Lalbazar, Chowringhee, Dharmatala, Rabindra Sadan, Tiretti Bazaar, Bow Barracks, Babughat, Princep Ghat and Hastings. Another important park is Millennium Park on Strand Road, beside the Hooghly River. Fort William, on the western part of the city (besides Maidan), houses the headquarters of the Eastern Command of the Indian Army.

==== South Kolkata ====
South Kolkata developed mainly after India gained independence in the year 1947. It includes upscale neighbourhoods such as Ballygunge, Alipore, New Alipore, Lansdowne, Bhawanipore, Kalighat, Gariahat, Southern Avenue, Chetla, Jodhpur Park, Lake Gardens, South City, Jadavpur, Dhakuria, Tollygunge,.

==== East Kolkata ====
East Kolkata is largely composed of newly developed areas like Topsia, Picnic Garden, Tangra, Gobra, Kustia, Tiljala, Anandapur, East Kolkata Twp, Panchasayar, Garia, Madurdaha, Nayabad, Kalikapur, Purbalok, Mukundapur, Ajoy Nagar, Hiland Park, Chak Garia, Patuli. In the pace of rapid urbanization and growing demand for housing and commercial spaces, the New Town, Kolkata was created on the eastern outskirts of Kolkata to serve the dual purpose of establishing a new business centre to reduce the mounting pressure on the existing Central Business Districts (CBD) and increasing housing stock supply by creating new residential units.

==== Howrah and Hooghly (Urban) ====
Technically Howrah and the urban part of Hooghly all have individual identities alongside they are the part of Kolkata Metropolis. Likewise Howrah city is a twin city of Kolkata city. Nabanna, Santragachi, Belur, Bally, Uttarpara, Konnogar, Rishra, Serampore, Bhadeswar, Chinsurah, Hooghly, Chandannagor and Bandel all cities under Kolkata Metropolitan Area, having their fragrance of history, culture. This area is called "Little Europe Of India". All areas are well connected with the city centre.

== Climate ==
Kolkata has a tropical savanna climate, with summer monsoons. The annual mean temperature is 29.2 °C (84.6 °F); monthly mean temperatures range from 19 to 30 °C (66 to 86 °F) and maximum temperatures can often exceed 45 °C (113 °F) during May–June. Winter tends to last from December to early-February, with the lowest temperatures hovering in the 12 °C — 14 °C range during December and January. The highest recorded temperature is 43 °C (109 °F) and the lowest is 5 °C (41 °F).

Monsoon is the most notable phenomenon in the climate of the city. Maximum rainfall occurs during the monsoon in August (306 mm) and the average annual total is 1,582 mm. Early morning mists and evening smog occur often due to temperature inversions. Summer is dominated by strong southwesterly monsoon winds. The city's total duration of sunshine is 2,528 hours per annum, with the maximum insolation occurring in March. Often during early summer, spells of thunderstorms and heavy rains lash the city, bringing some relief from the heat and intolerable humidity. These thunderstorms are locally known as Kalbaishakhi (Nor-wester). According to a United Nations Development Programme report, its wind and cyclone zone is a "very high damage risk".
