= AJC Bose Road & APC Road =

Road in Kolkata, India

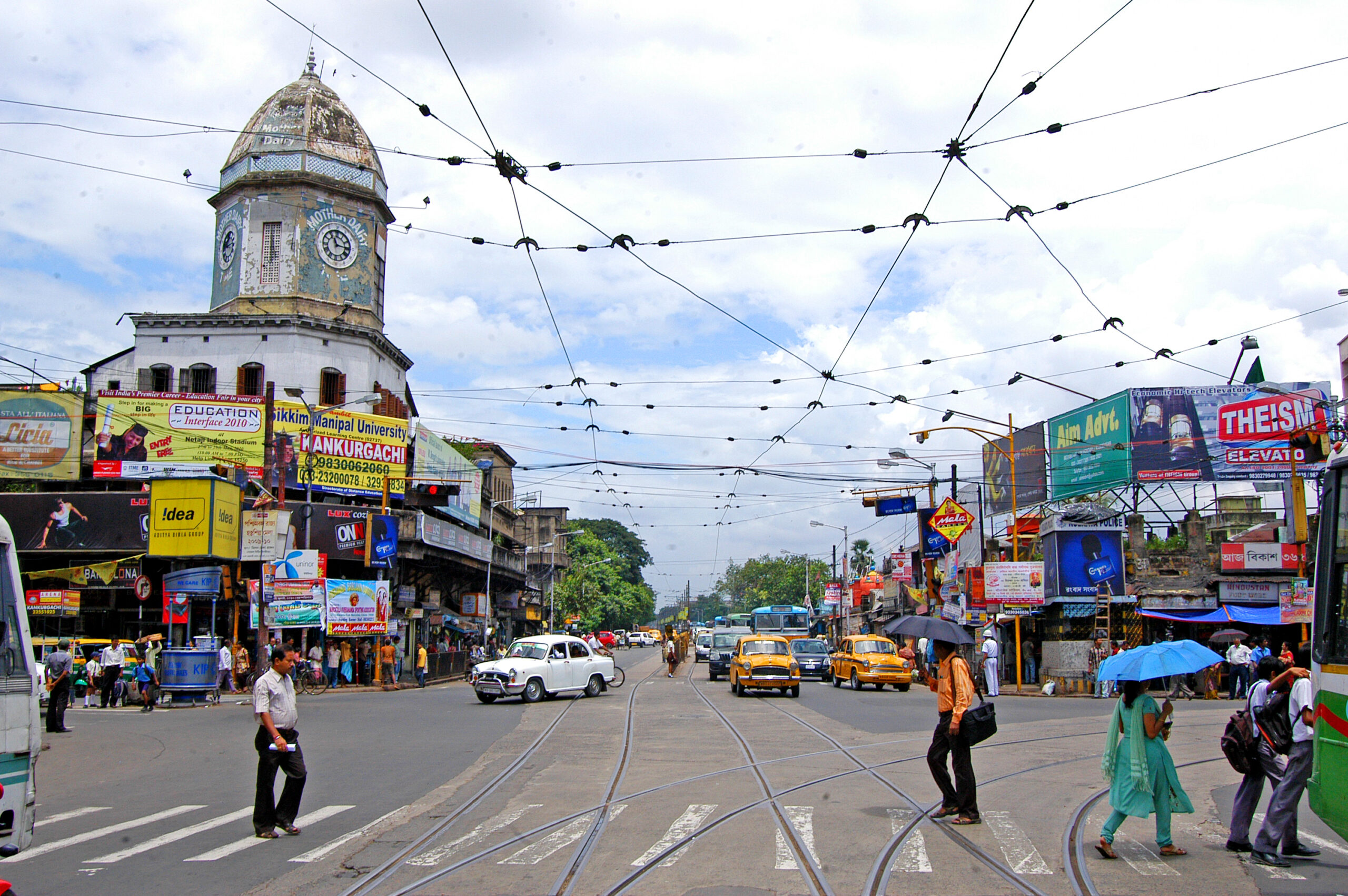
- Interactive map of AJC Bose Road & APC Road
- Former name(s): Lower Circular Road & Upper Circular Road
- Maintained by: Kolkata Municipal Corporation
- Location: Kolkata, India
- Nearest Kolkata Metro station: Shyambazar; Sealdah; Rabindra Sadan; Victoria (under construction)
- Coordinates: 22.597225°N 88.374834°E

Acharya Jagadish Chandra Bose Road (earlier known as Lower Circular Road) and its continuation northwards called Acharya Prafulla Chandra Road (earlier known as Upper Circular Road), are together the longest and the most important north-south thoroughfare in Kolkata, India.

== History ==
The road came upon the stretch that formed the Maratha Ditch that was dug in 1742 to protect the City from the Bargi invasions. In 1799 the ditch was filled up and the current outline of the road built. Until the 1870s, the Circular Road was considered the de facto eastern boundary of the City of Calcutta as the suburbs to its east, i.e. Manicktala, Rajabazar, Narikeldanga, Ultadanga, and Beliaghata were still semi-urban semi-rural villages.

== Legacy ==
Named after the renowned chemist Acharya Prafulla Chandra Roy and the renowned physicist and botanist Acharya Jagadish Chandra Bose.

== Stretch and description ==
APC Road and AJC Bose Road taken together is the longest road in Kolkata. APC Road emerges from the Shyambazar Five-Point Crossing (Paanch Mathar More). It then passes through Khanna Crossing, Beadon Street Crossing, Maniktala Crossing, Rajabazar Crossing, M. G. Road Crossing, Vidyapati Flyover and ends at Sealdah Station.

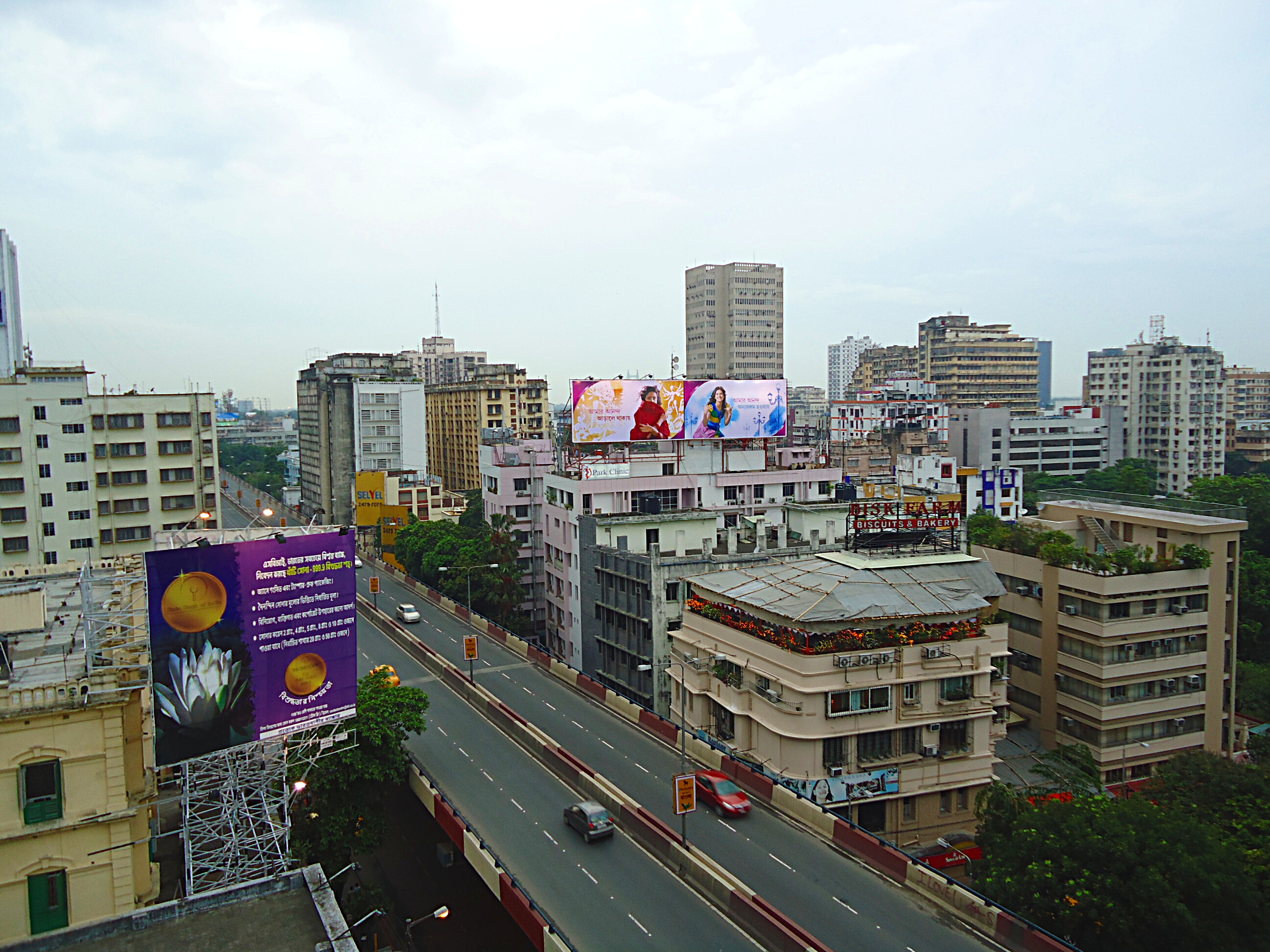
AJC Bose Road Flyover

From Sealdah Station, it is known as AJC Bose Road, which passes through Lenin Sarani Crossing (Moulali Crossing), S. N. Banerjee Road Crossing, Ripon Street Crossing, Elliot Road Crossing, Park Street Crossing (Mullick Bazar), Shakespeare Sarani Crossing, Circus Avenue Crossing (Beck Bagan), Ballygunge Circular Road Crossing, Lansdowne Crossing (Minto Park), Camac Street Crossing, Lee Road Crossing, Chowringhee Crossing or Exide Crossing, Cathedral Road Crossing (Nandan and Rabindra Sadan on one side), Victoria Memorial-Hospital Road/Debendra Lal Khan Road Crossing, Alipore Road Crossing, Kolkata Race Course on one side and finishes its journey at Strand Road-Hastings Crossing. From the Point of Circus Avenue Crossing till the Victoria Memorial, the road runs below the "AJC Bose Road Flyover", which is the 2nd longest flyover and busiest flyover in the city at 2.9 km long, connecting Park Circus to Victoria Memorial on one branch, and serving as the direct flyover connection onto Parama Island Flyover on the other branch. After both ramps of the flyover connecting it with Parama Island Flyover were completed in early 2019, the flyover forms a seamless, no-signal traffic corridor known as Maa flyover from PG Hospital to EM Bypass.

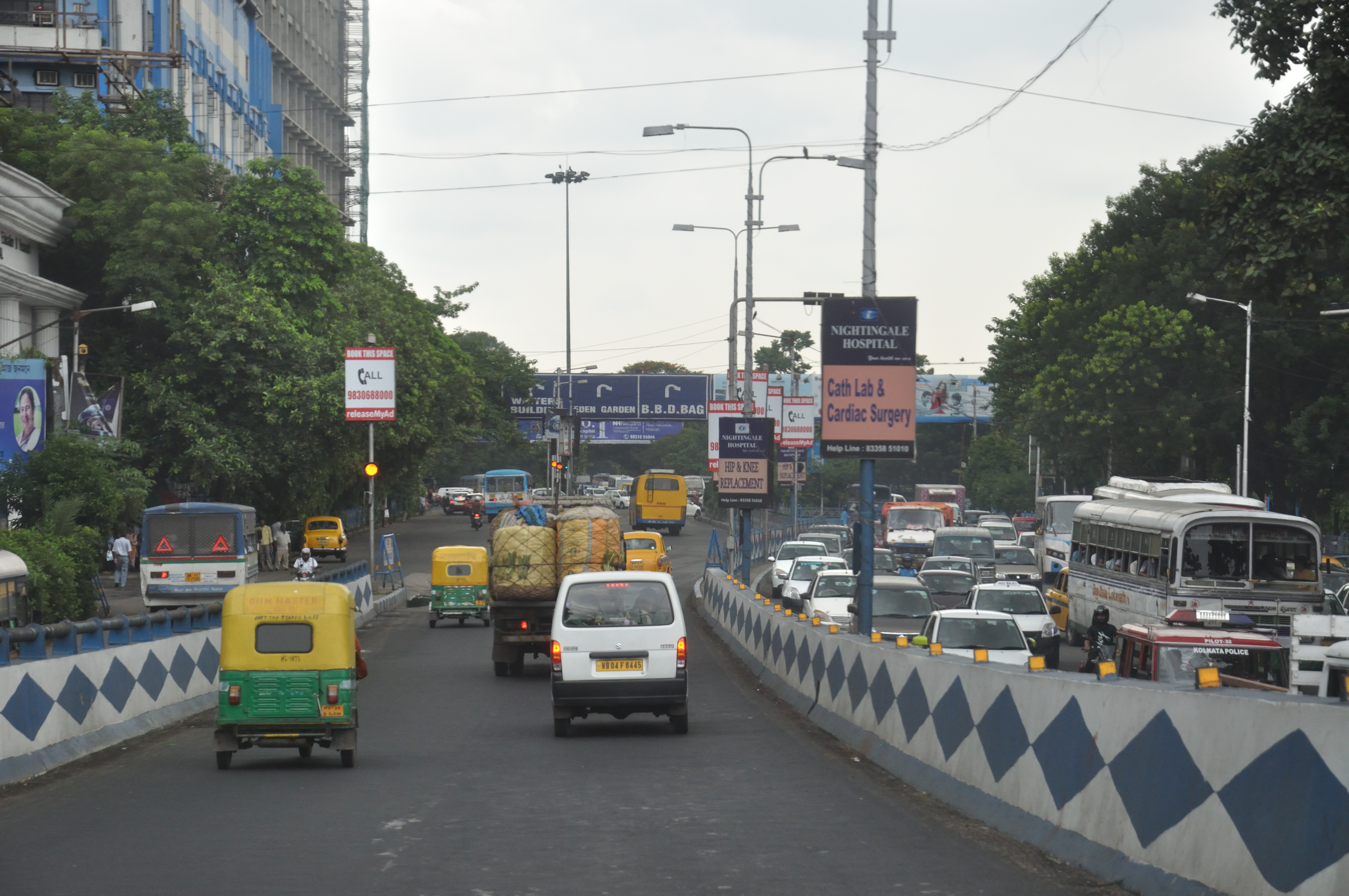
Western Ramp of AJC Bose Road Flyover - PTS, Kolkata

== Landmarks ==
- Shyambazar, Five-Point Crossing
- Khanna Cinema
- Bangiya Sahitya Parishad
- Central Blood Bank
- Rammohan Library
- Bose Institute
- Calcuta Deaf School
- Rajabazar Science College
- Dr. M N Chatterjee Eye Hospital & Ayurvedic College and Hospital
- Victoria Institution
- Sealdah ESI Hospital
- Vidyapati Flyover
- Sealdah Station
- Nil Ratan Sircar Medical College and Hospital
- Dr. R. Ahmed Dental College and Hospital
- Mother Teresa's Shishu Bhavan
- St James' School
- Pratt Memorial school- one of the oldest schools of Kolkata
- Mother House, Missionaries of Charity
- Lower Circular Road cemetery
- Institute of Neurosciences Kolkata
- Tulip Inn Hotel
- La Martiniere School for boys and girls
- Minto Park (Shaheed Bhagat Singh Udyan)
- Hotel Hindustan International
- St Joseph's Home
- Acharya Jagadish Chandra Bose College
- Nehru Children's Museum
- The Calcutta Club
- Nandan
- Rabindra Sadan
- Kolkata Race Course
- SSKM Hospital
- Dr. B. C. Roy Post Graduate Institute of Basic Medical Sciences
- The Frank Anthony Public School, Kolkata

== Gallery ==
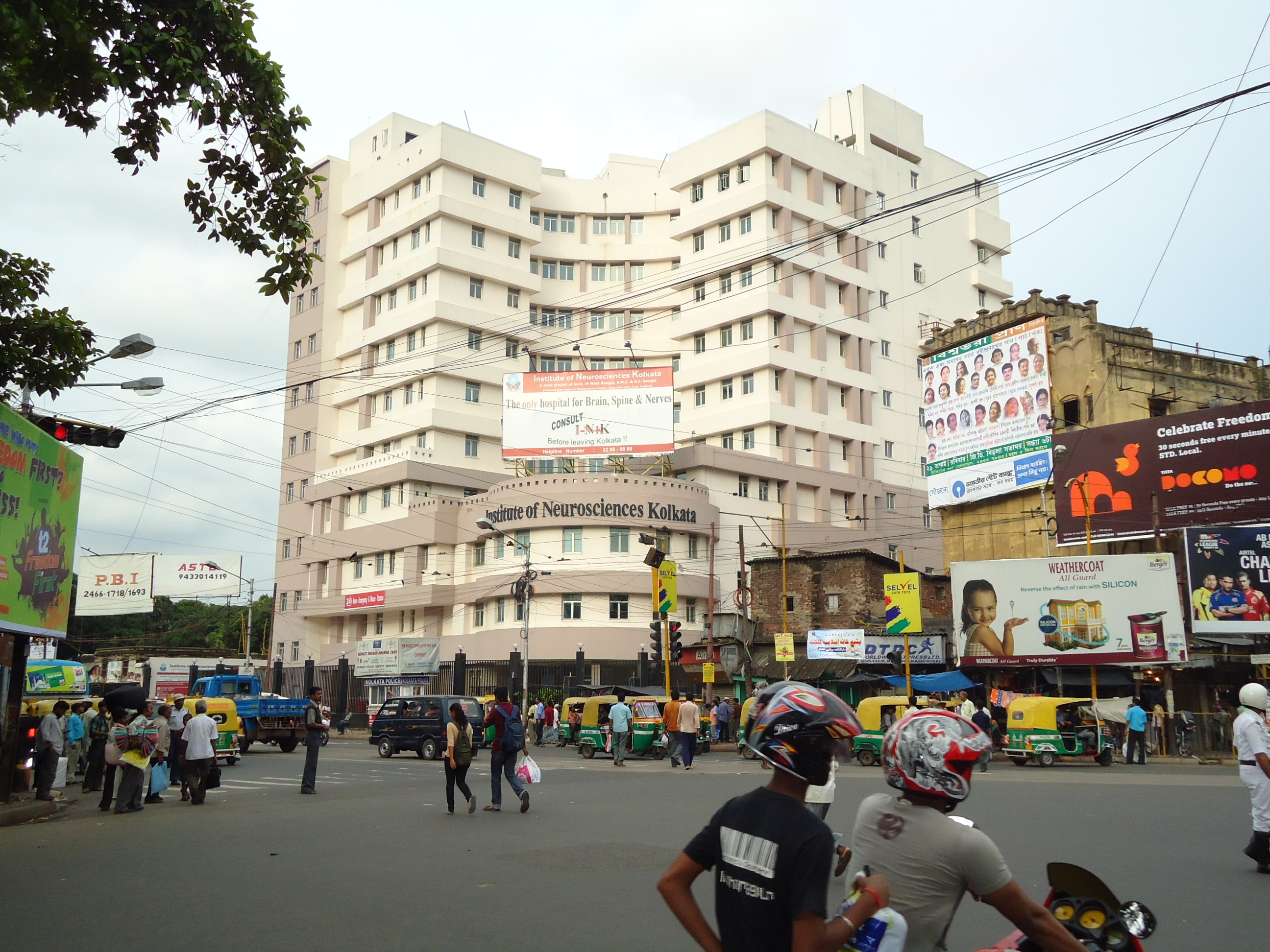
Institute of Neurosciences, Kolkata at the crossing of Park Street and AJC Bose Road

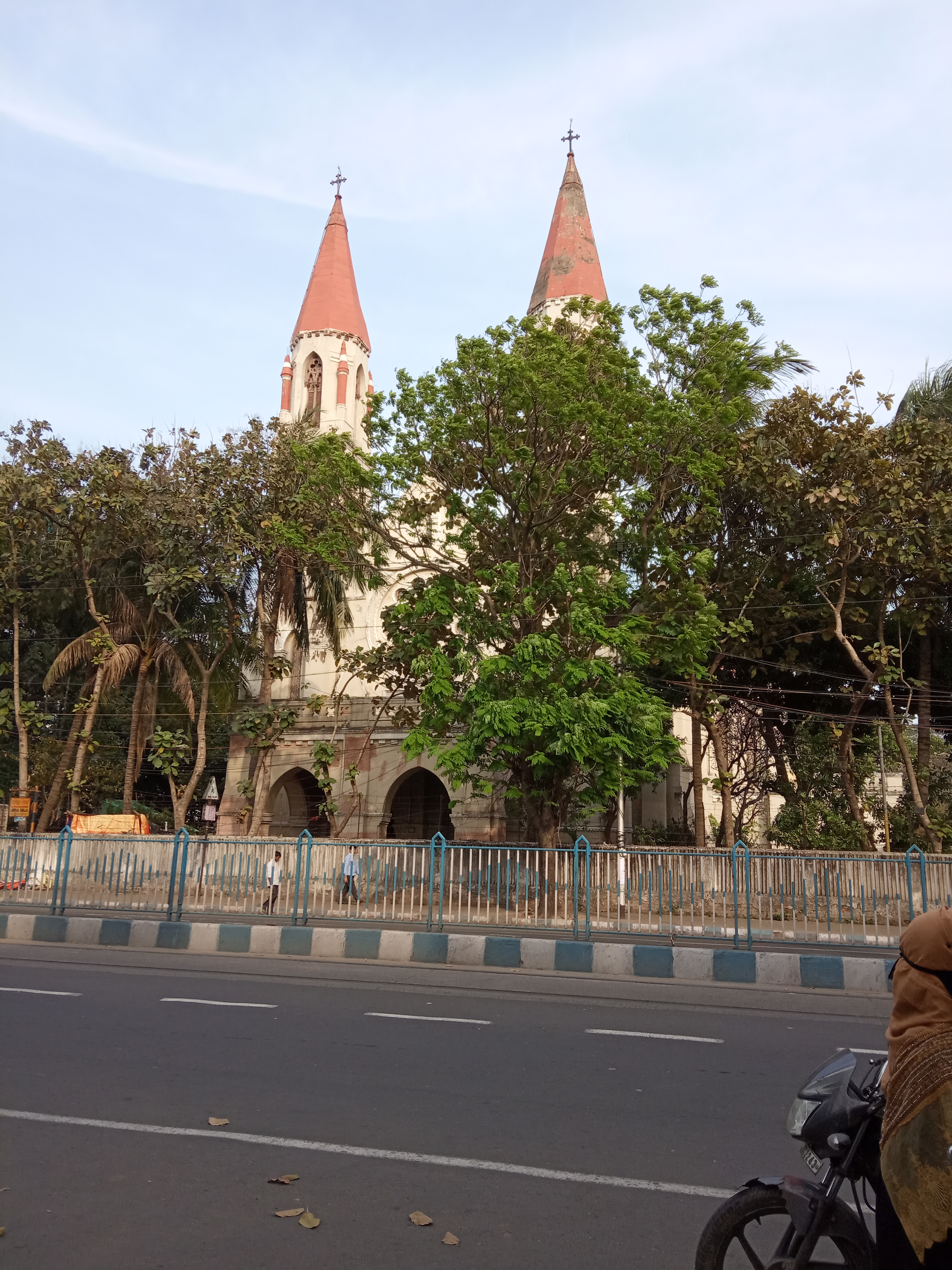
Jora Girja (St. James' Church) on AJC Bose Road

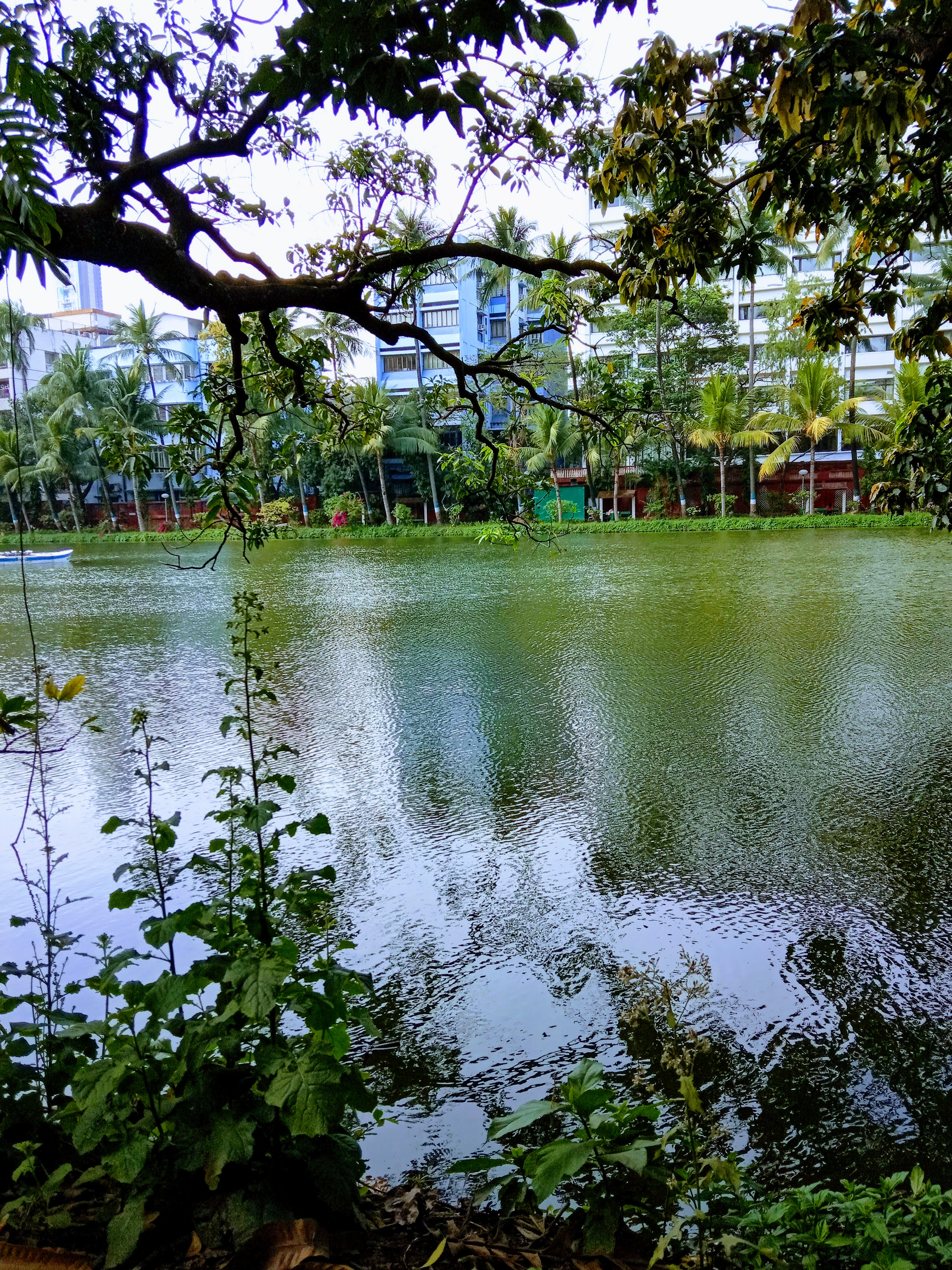
Shaheed Bhagat Singh Udyan (Minto Park) on AJC Bose Road

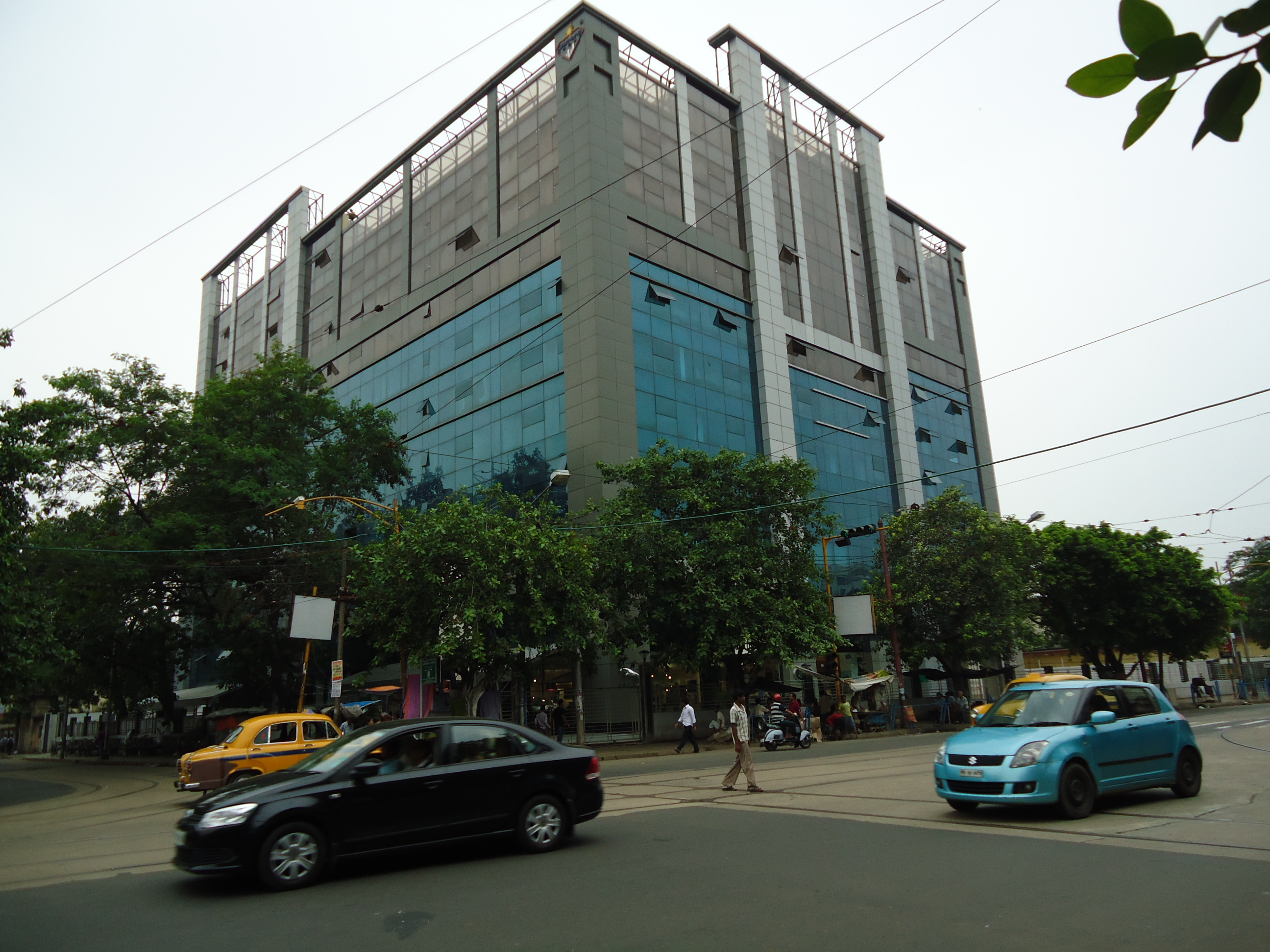
Diamond Prestige, an office block on AJC Bose Road, houses a 'Jaguar' showroom

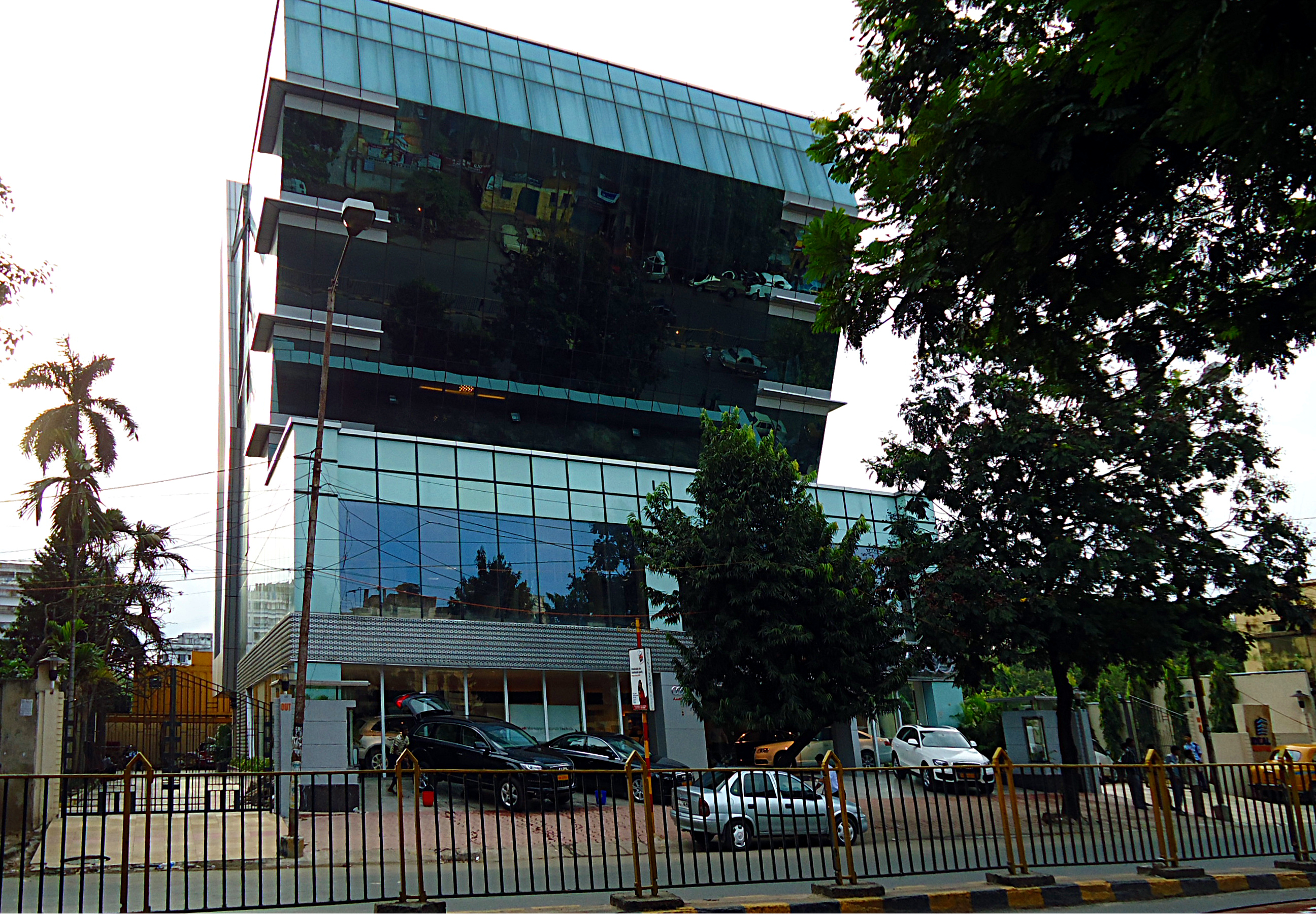
Ideal Center on AJC Bose Road, houses an 'Audi' showroom

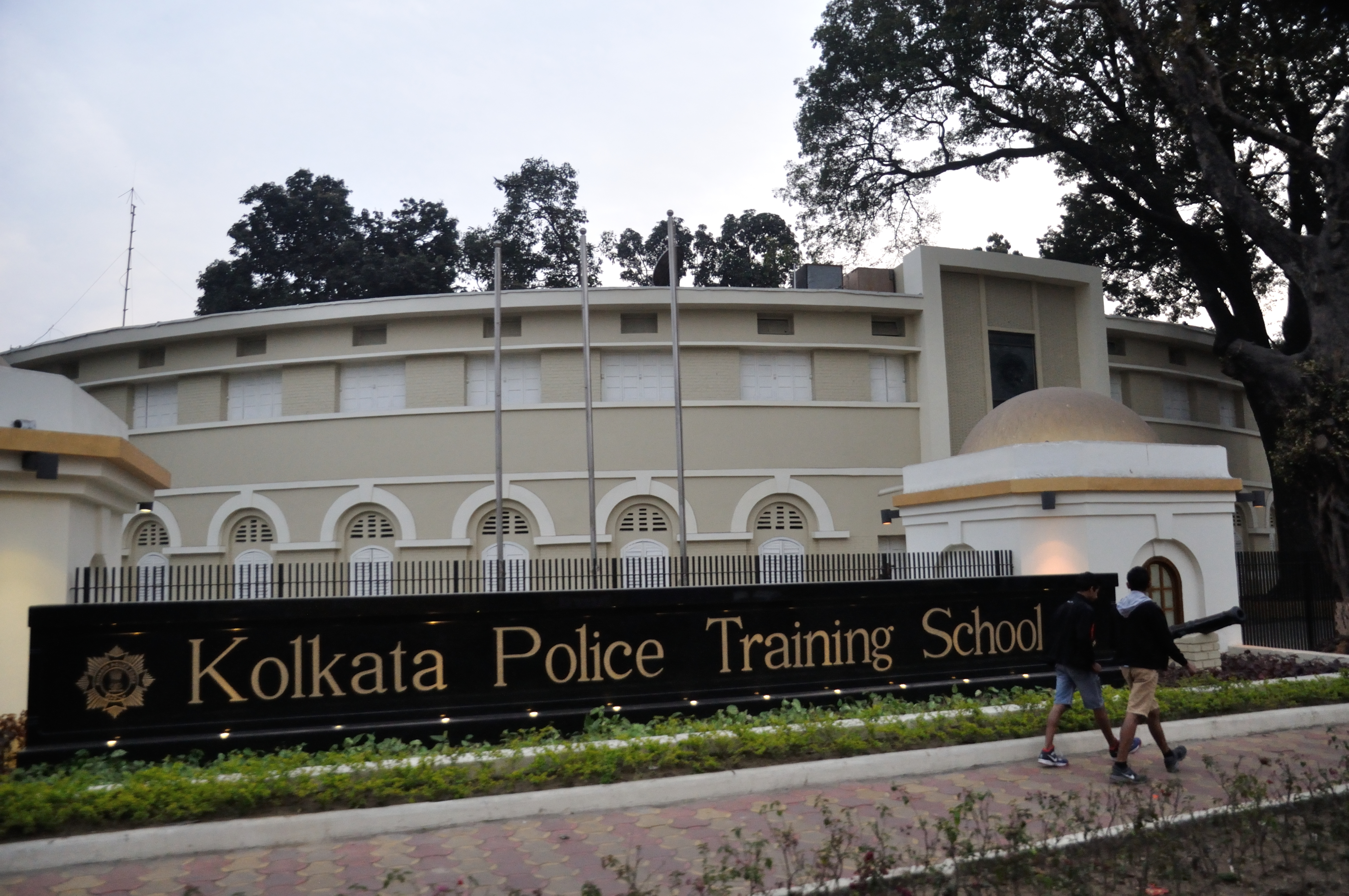
Kolkata Police Training School (PTS) on AJC Bose Road
