= Chowringhee =

Neighborhood of Kolkata, West Bengal, India

- Neighborhood of Kolkata
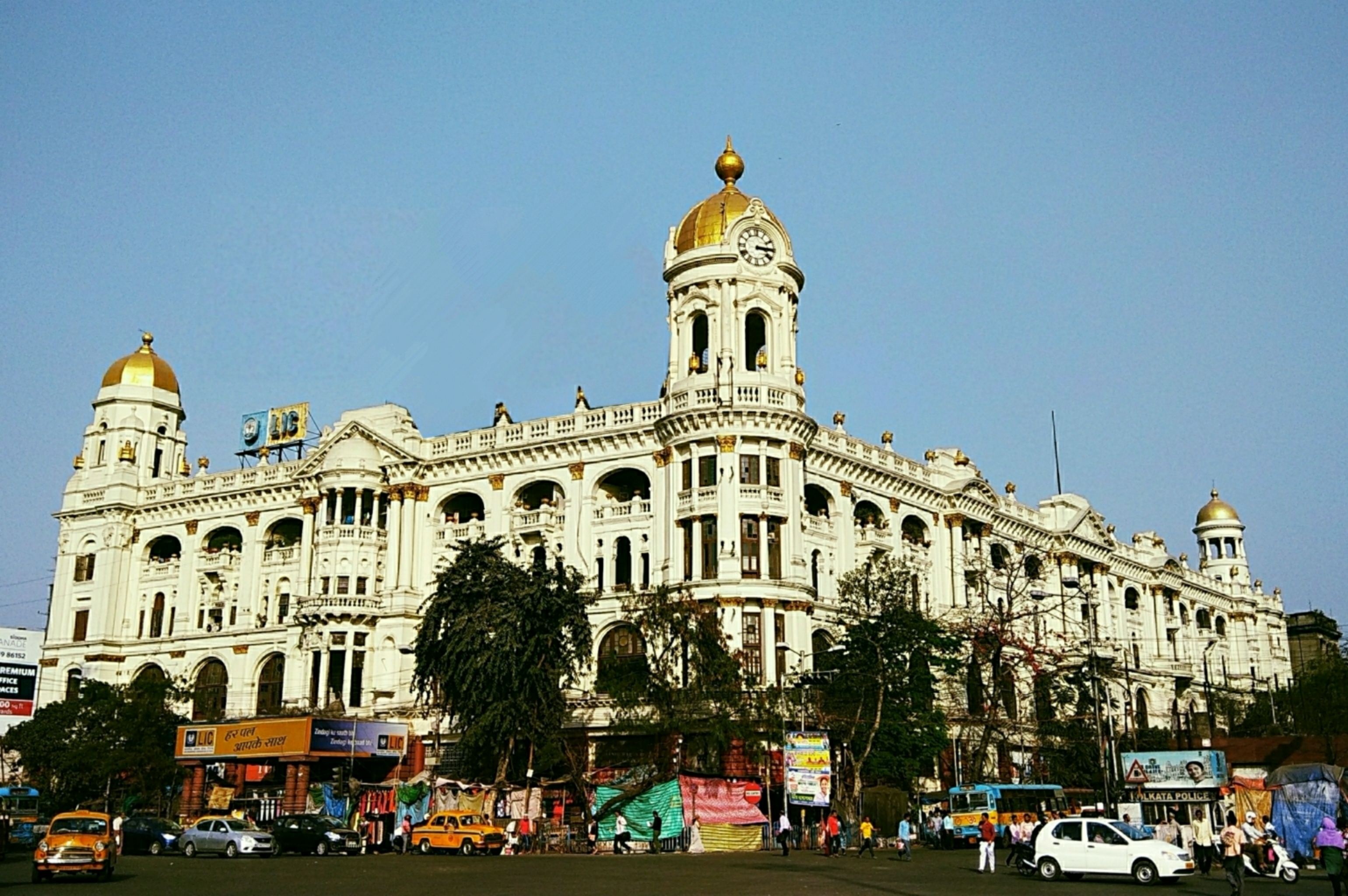
- Metropolitan Building near Chowringhee

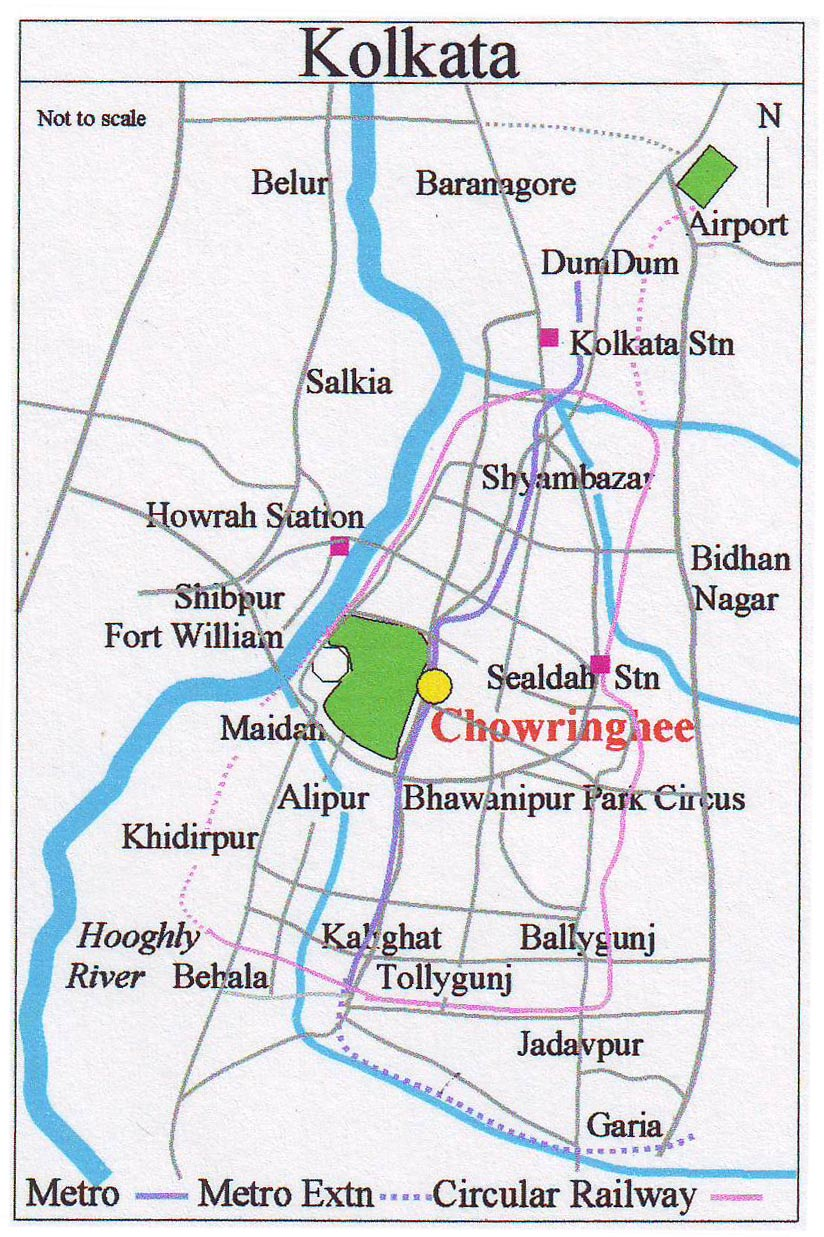
- Location of Chowringhee in Kolkata
- Coordinates: 23.8°N 88.25°E
- Country: India
- State: West Bengal
- City: Kolkata
- District: Kolkata
- KMC wards: 46, 63
- Metro Station: Esplanade, Park Street, Maidan and Rabindra Sadan
- Kolkata Suburban Railway: Sealdah, Princep Ghat, Eden Gardens and B.B.D. Bagh
- Elevation: 36 ft (11 m)

Population (2001)
  - Total: 159,917
- Time zone: UTC+5:30 (IST)
- PIN: 700013, 700016, 700071, 700087
- Area code: +91 33
- Lok Sabha constituency: Kolkata Uttar and Kolkata Dakshin
- Vidhan Sabha constituency: Chowranghee and Bhabanipur

Chowringhee (also Chourangi) is a neighbourhood of Central Kolkata, in Kolkata district in the Indian state of West Bengal. Chowringhee Road (officially Jawaharlal Nehru Road) runs on its western side. A neighbourhood steeped in history, it is a business district, as well as a shopper's destination and entertainment-hotel centre. The area lies exactly at the centre of the city.

== Etymology ==
The name 'Chowringhee' has defied etymologists. There is, however, the legend of a Nath yogi, Chouranginath, who discovered an image of the goddess Kali's face and built the first Kalighat temple.

== History ==
=== The village ===
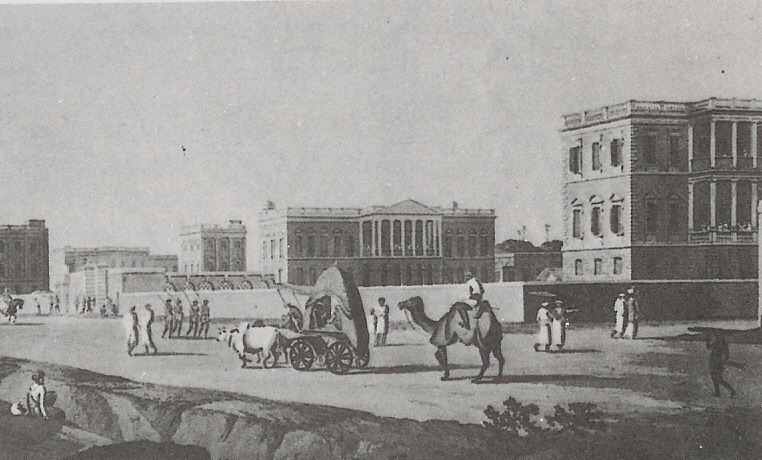
Chowringhee in 1798

In the seventeenth century or prior to it, the area now occupied by the Maidan and Esplanade was a tiger-infested jungle. At the eastern end of it was an old road, which had once been built by the Sabarna Roy Choudhury family from Barisha to Halisahar. In that region were three small hamlets – Chowringhee, Birjee and Colimba.

=== Urbanisation ===
The strengthening of British power, subsequent to their victory in the Battle of Plassey was followed by the construction of the new Fort William, in 1758. The European inhabitants of Kalikata gradually forsook the narrow limits of the old palisades and moved to around the Maidan.

=== The neighbourhood ===
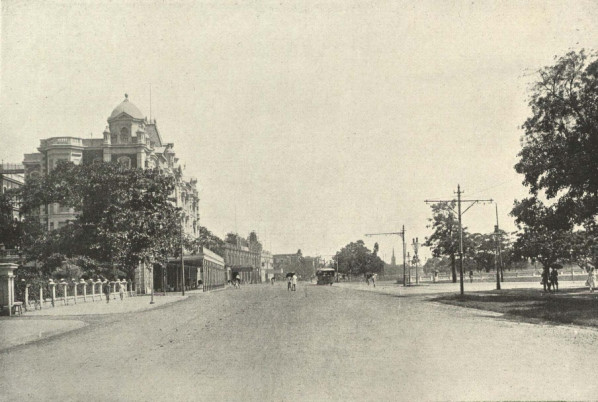
Chowringhee looking south, 1905

Camac Street (renamed Abanindranath Tagore Sarani) running from Park Street to Circular Road was named after William Camac, a senior merchant in the days of Cornwallis and Wellesley. Wood Street was named after Henry Wood. Free School Street (renamed Mirza Ghalib Street), named after a Free School established there in 1786, was a bamboo jungle in 1780.

=== New names ===
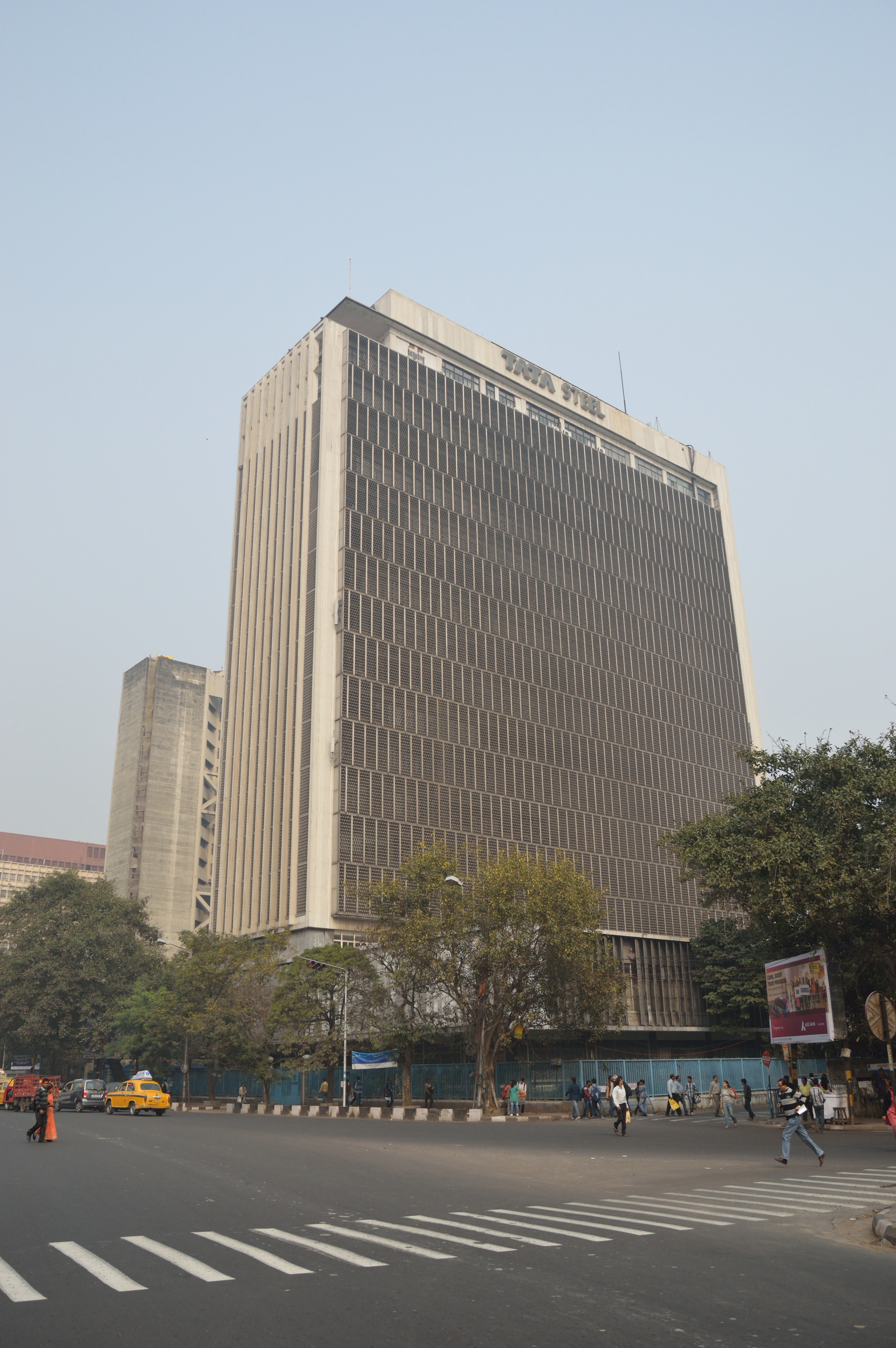
Tata Centre on Chowringhee Road - The main stretch of Chowringhee

Indian independence saw a rush to rename streets. The process has slowed as few streets are left to be renamed. Chowringhee Road was renamed after Jawaharlal Nehru, the first Prime Minister of India. Park Street was renamed after Mother Teresa; Theatre Road after William Shakespeare; and Harrington Street after the leader of the Vietnam independence movement, Ho Chi Minh. Camac Street has been renamed after the artist Abanindranath Tagore. Russel Street was renamed after industrialist Anandi Lal Poddar. Free School Street was renamed after the Urdu/Persian poet Mirza Ghalib. Kyd Street was renamed Dr. Md. Ishaque Road. Lindsay Street was renamed after Nellie Sengupta.

== Geography ==
Park Street Flyover was inaugurated on 19 February 2005. The 1.3-kilometre (0.81 mi) long flyover above Chowringhee Road helps in reduce the traffic jam between Lindsay Street and Middleton Street.

== Creative inspiration ==
In 1981, Aparna Sen wrote and directed a film, 36 Chowringhee Lane, about an aged Anglo-Indian school teacher who lives a lonely life in a single-room flat in the neighbourhood.

== Gallery ==
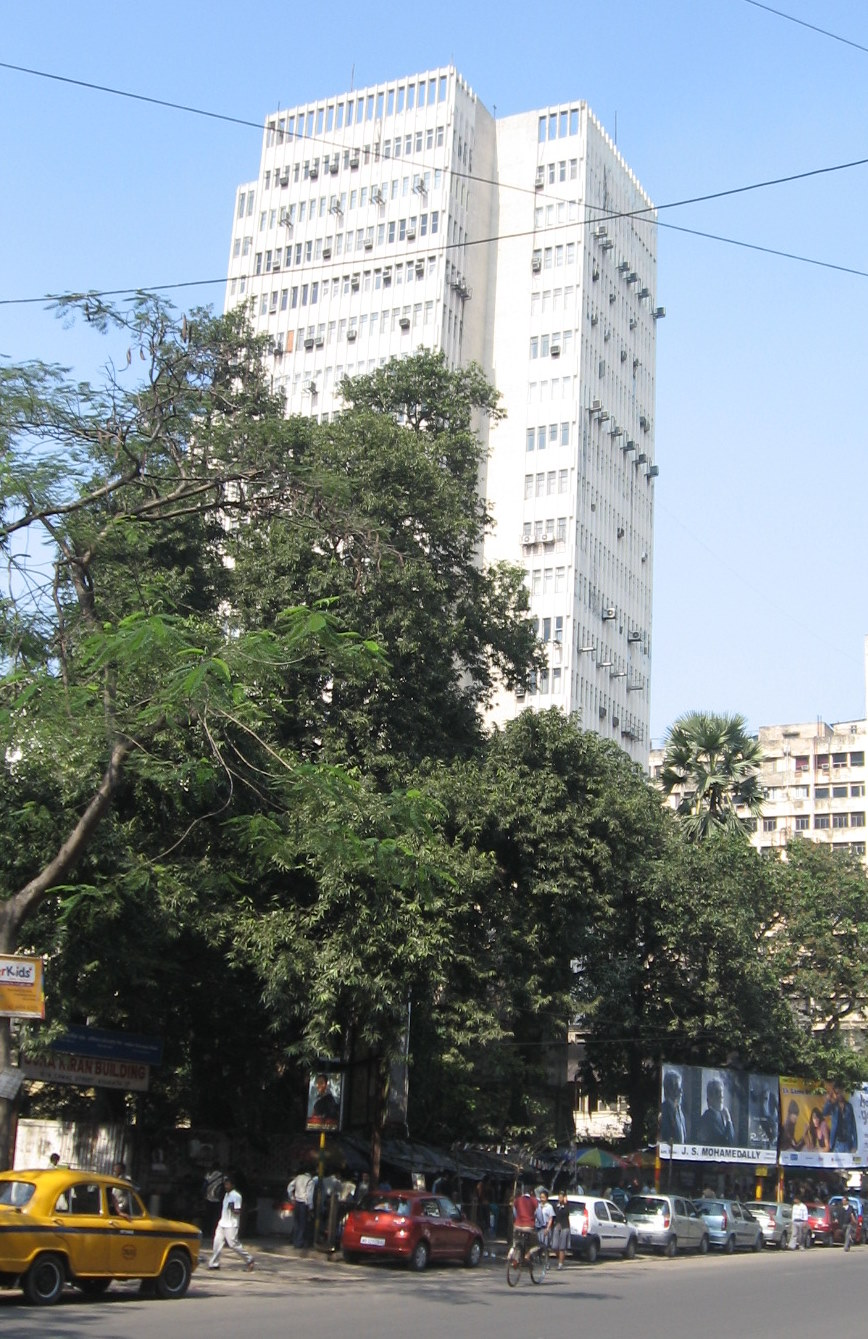
Industry House on Abanindranath Tagore Sarani

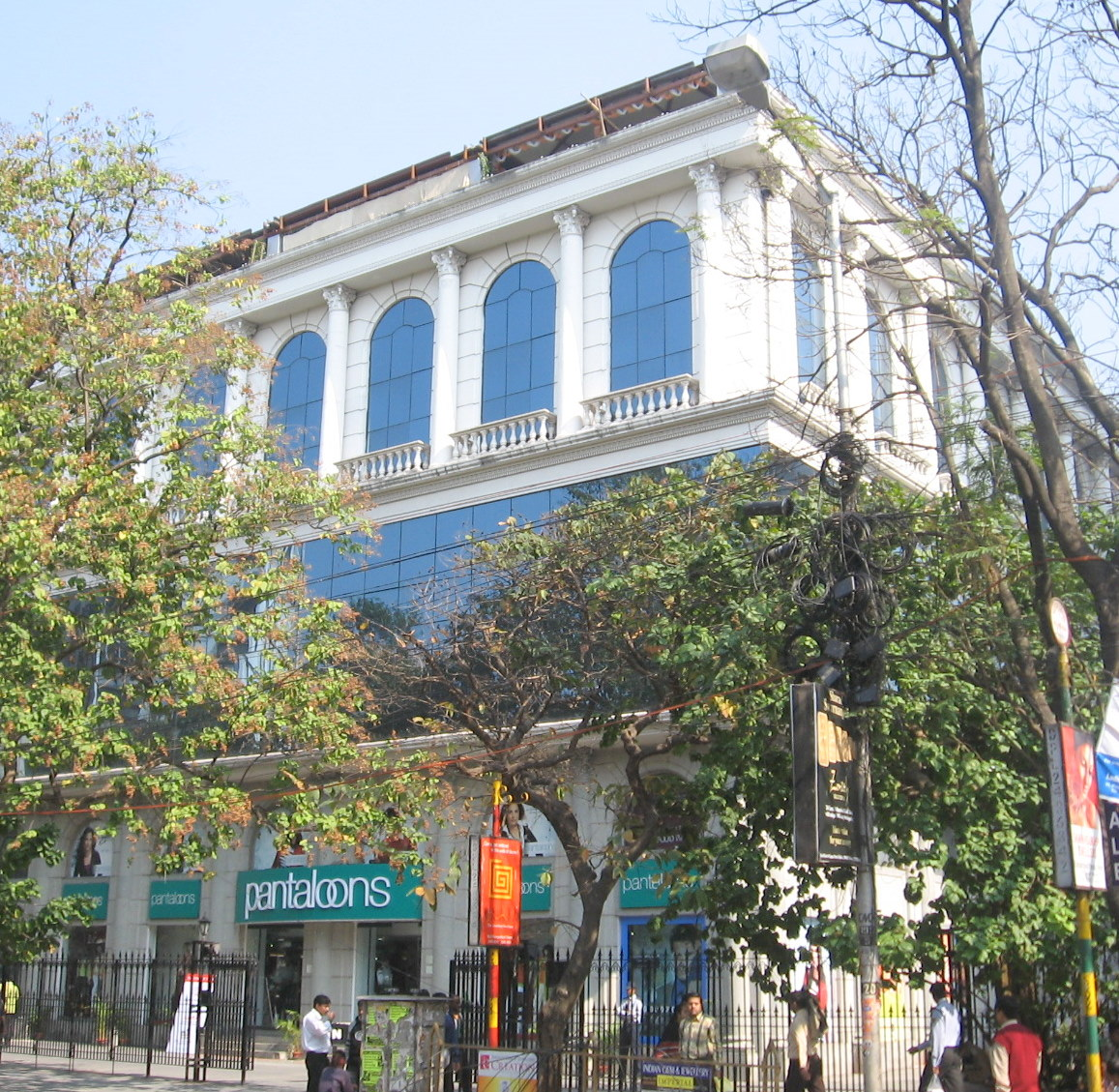
Pantaloon outlet on Abanindranath Tagore Sarani

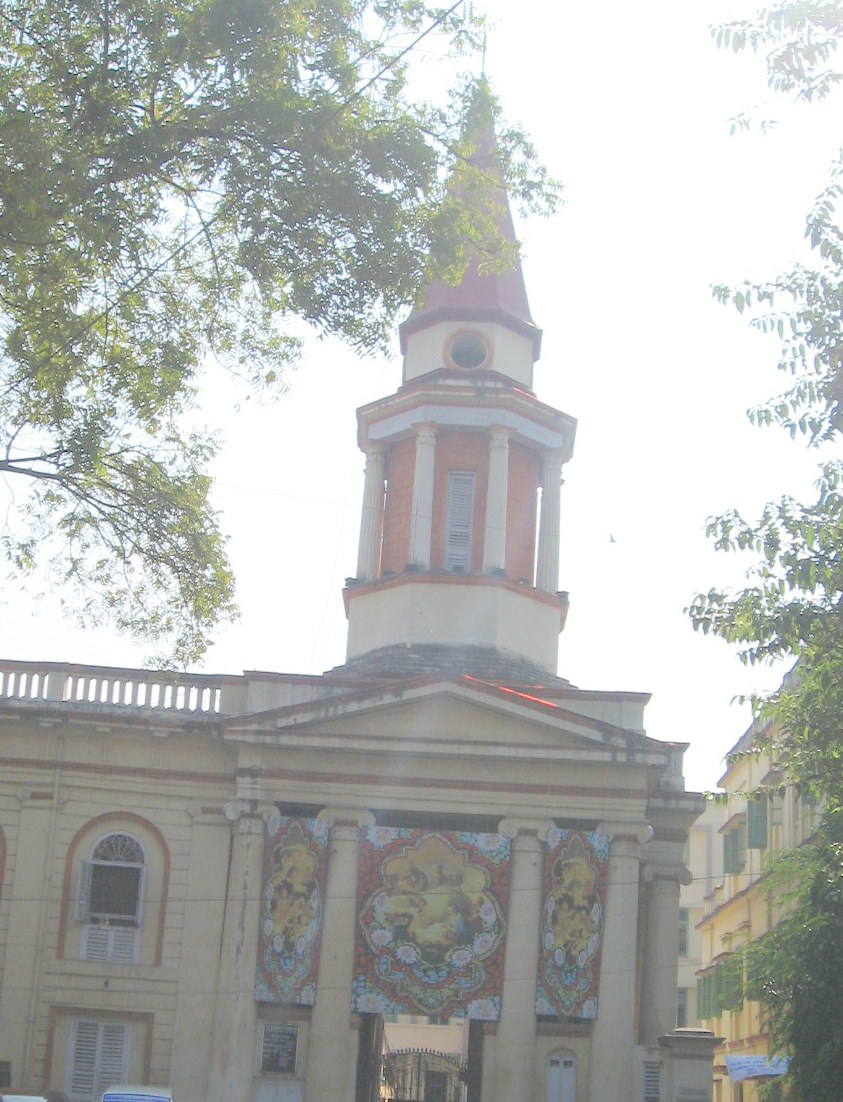
St. Thomas Church adjacent to Loreto House on Middleton Row

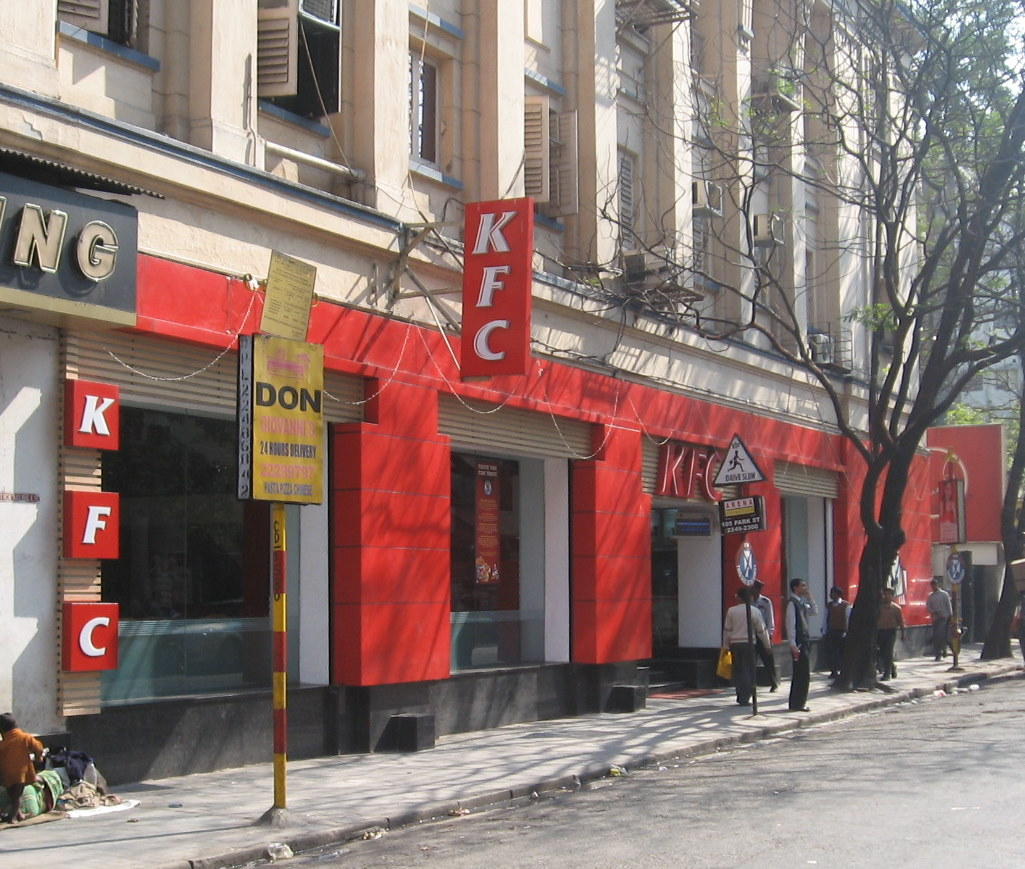
KFC outlet on Middleton Row

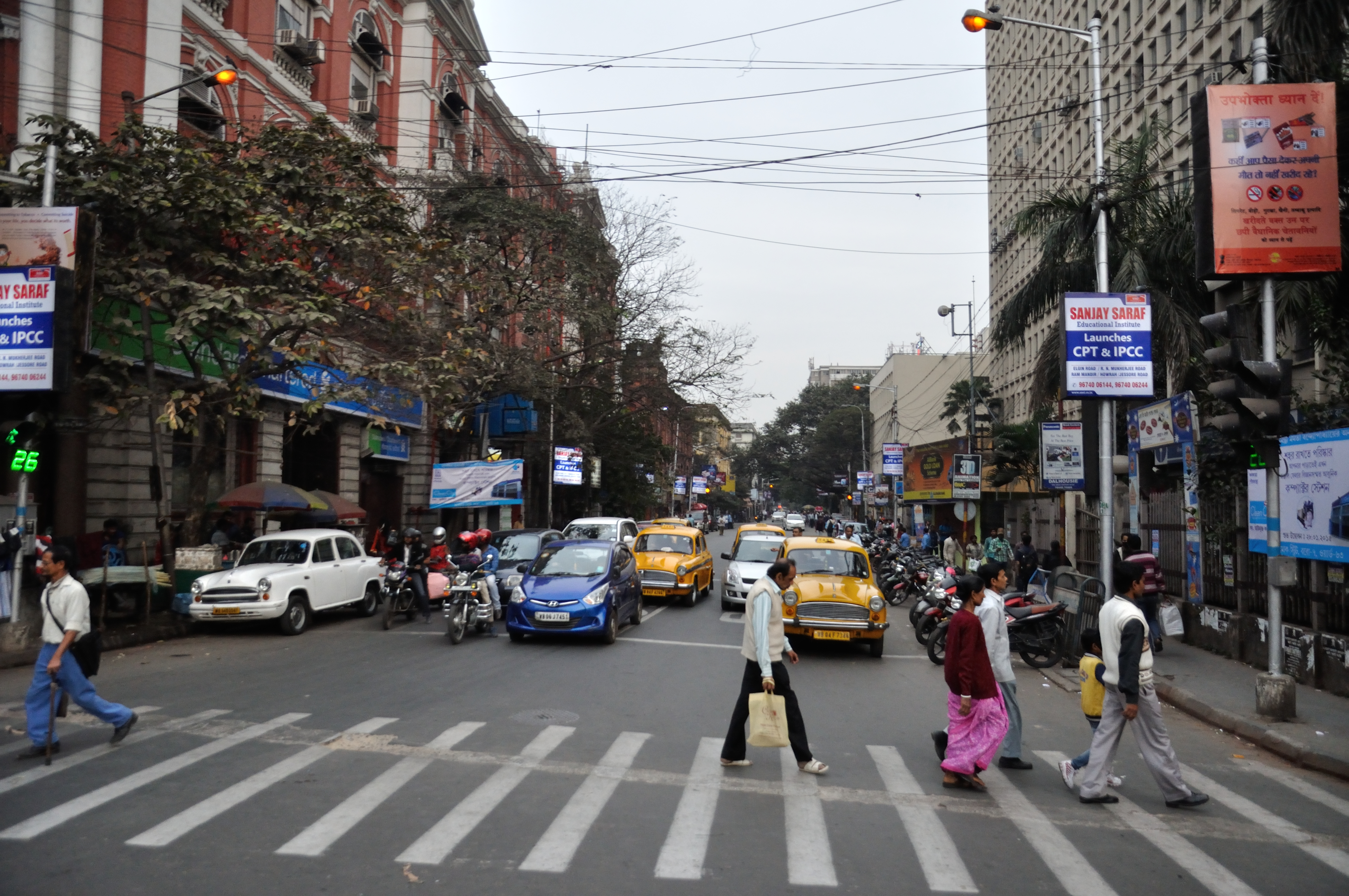
Middleton Street

Park Street Flyover
