= Bangiya Sahitya Parishat =

Indian literary society

- Façade of Bangiya Sahitya Parishat building
- Other name: বঙ্গীয় সাহিত্য পরিষৎ
- Established: 23 July 1893; 132 years ago
- Focus: Study and development of the Bengali Language and Literature.
- President: Baridbaran Ghosh
- Formerly called: Bengal Academy of Literature
- Address: 243/1, Acharya Prafulla Chandra Road, Kolkata-700006
- Location: Kolkata, West Bengal, India
- Website: bangiyasahityaparishat.org

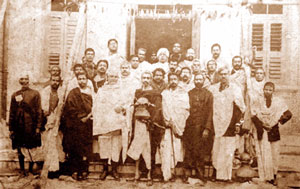
Bangiya Sahitya Parishad 6 December 1908

Bangiya Sahitya Parishat (lit. 'Bengal Academy of Literature') is a literary society in Maniktala of Kolkata, West Bengal, India. Established during the time of the British Raj, its goal is to promote Bengali literature, both by translating works in other languages to Bengali and promoting the production of original Bengali literature.

== History ==
The organisation was founded by L. Leotard and Kshetrapal Chakraborty on 23 July 1893. Then it was known as The Bengal Academy of Literature. On 29 April 1894, the name of the society itself was changed to Bangiya Sahitya Parishat. 1894 saw the first officers, with Romesh Chunder Dutt as the first president and Rabindranath Tagore and Nabinchandra Sen as vice presidents.

== See also ==
- Manipuri Sahitya Parishad
