= Shakespeare Sarani =

Road in Kolkata, India

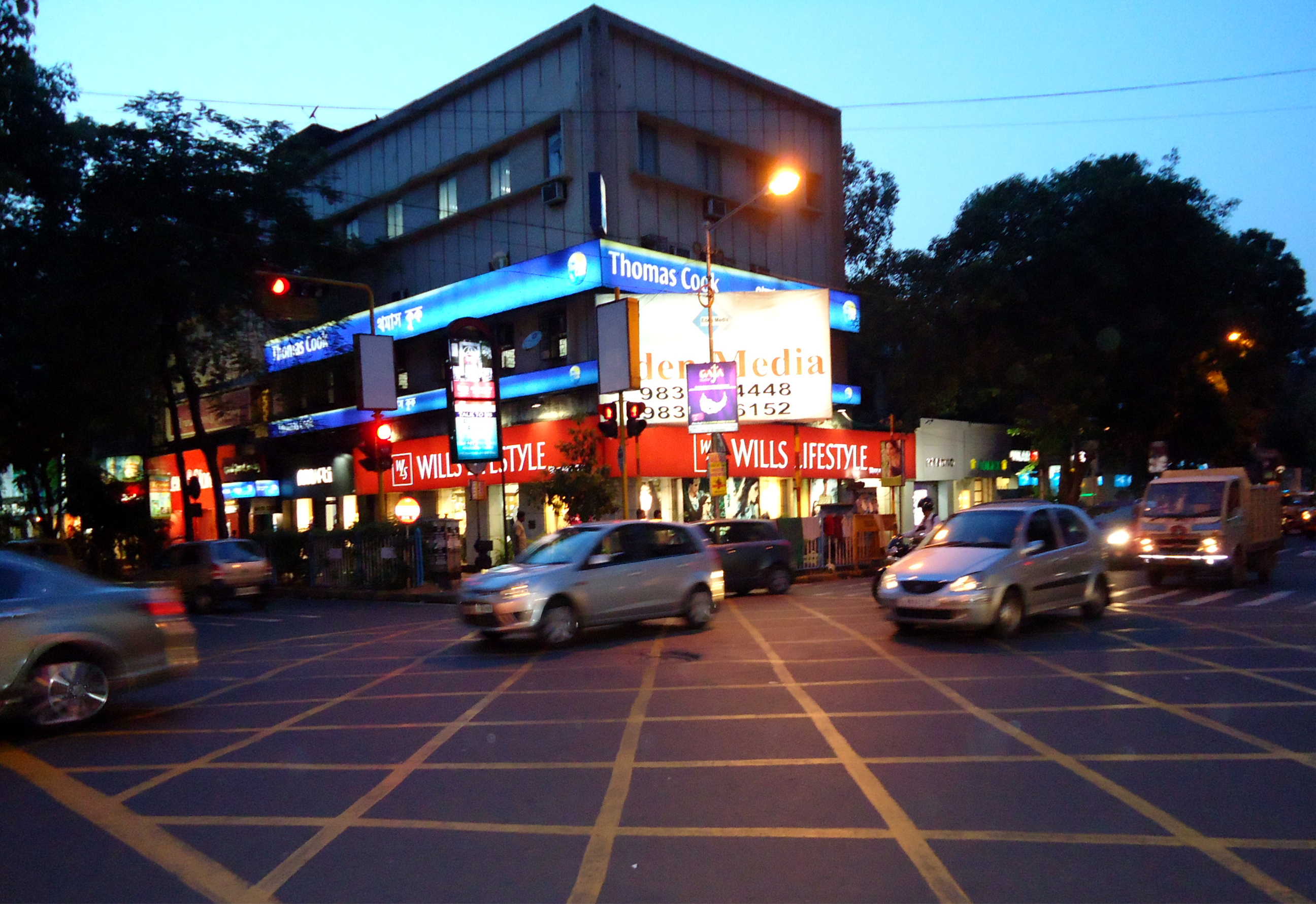
- Shakespeare Sarani and Camac Street crossing
- Former name: Theatre Road
- Maintained by: Kolkata Municipal Corporation
- Location: Kolkata, India
- Postal code: 700017, 700071
- Nearest Kolkata Metro station: Maidan; Rabindra Sadan
- West end: Chowringhee Road (Maidan)
- East end: Park Circus 7-point crossing

Other
- Known for: Named after William Shakespeare on the occasion of his fourth birth centenary

Shakespeare Sarani (earlier Theatre Road) is a street running in the central business district of Kolkata, India, from Park Circus to Chowringhee Road (Birla Planetarium). It was renamed on 24 April 1964 after William Shakespeare, to mark the fourth birth centenary of the legendary playwright. It is considered to be a high street of Kolkata with many commercial establishments, offices, shops and restaurants situated by the road. It intersects with other important roads in the CBD like Acharya Jagadish Chandra Bose Road, Camac Street, Loudon Street and Rawdon Street. Few other roads like, Little Russel Street, Wood Street, Picasso Bithi & Lord Sinha Road criss-crosses or merge into Shakespeare Sarani from North or South. To the West of Birla Planetarium crossing, Shakespeare Sarani becomes Queen's Way.

== History ==
At the corner of Chowringhee Road and Theatre Road was the Theatre of Calcutta from 1813 to 1839. It was burnt down by fire and never rebuilt.

== Geography ==
=== Landmarks ===
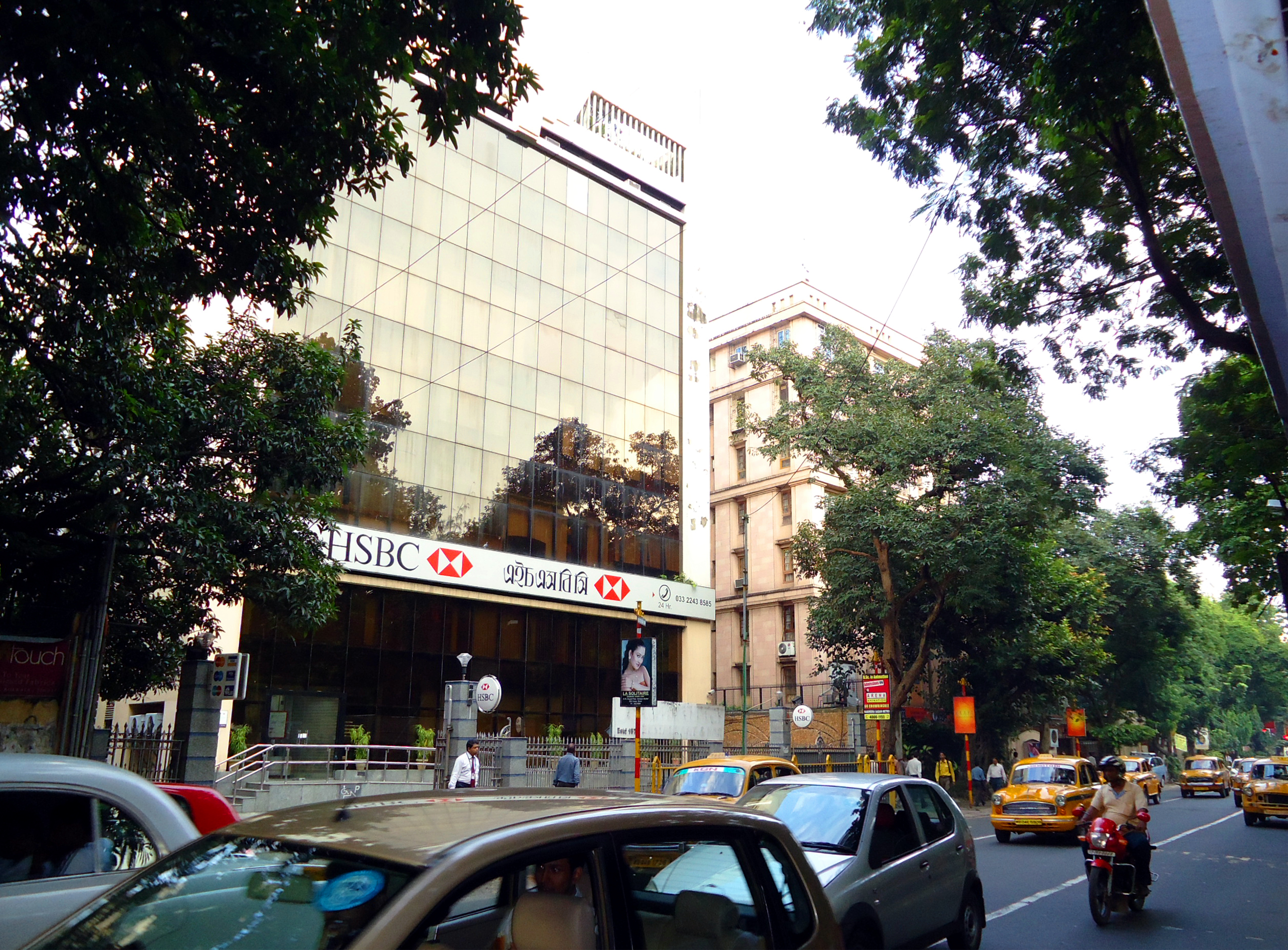
Shakespeare Sarani 'Jasmine Tower'

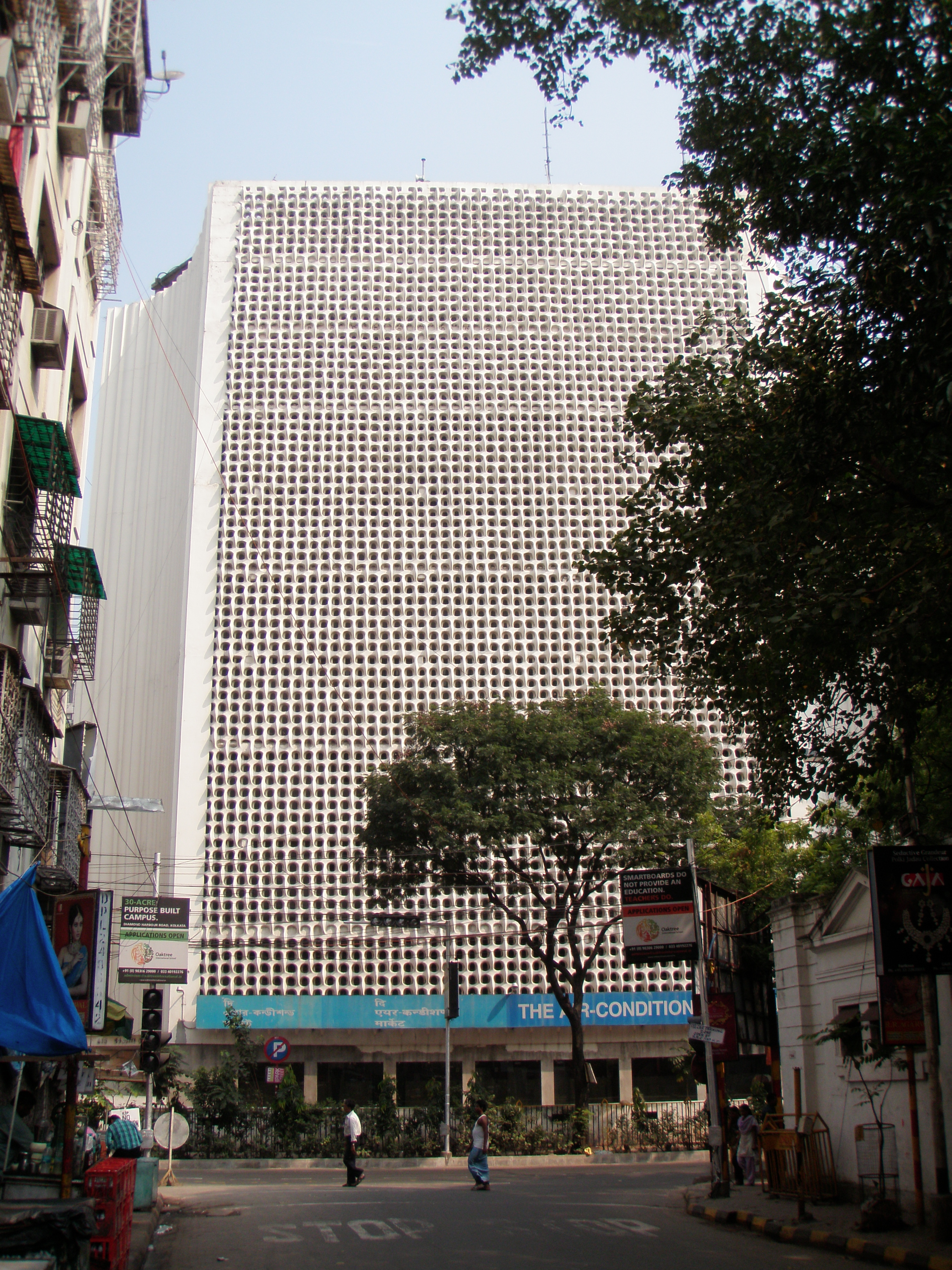
The Air Conditioned Market

- Astor Hotel
- AC Market (The first air-conditioned shopping mall in Kolkata)
- Bharatiya Bhasha Parishad (Indian Language Council)
- Consulate of Philippines
- Duckback House
- Express Tower (houses number of food outlets and offices)
- International Club (earlier Swiss Club)
- Jasmine Tower
- Kala Mandir
- L&T House (at Little Russell Street crossing)
- Marda Plaza (A retail cum commercial complex)
- Nagaland House
- New B K Market
- New Kenilworth Hotel (at Little Russell Street crossing)
- Premlata building
- Rani Birla Girls' College
- Shakespeare Court (at Camac Street crossing)
- Sri Aurobindo Bhavan
- State Archive
- The Legacy
- Unilever House

=== Police district ===
Shakespere Sarani police station is part of the South division of Kolkata Police. Located at 34A, Shakespeare Sarani, Kolkata-700017, it has jurisdiction over the police district which is bordered on the north from the south-west corner of the junction of Park Street, Outram Road and Jawaharlal Nehru Road (old Chowringhee Road), then crossing Jawaharlal Nehru Road to the south east corner of the junction of the Park Street and Jawaharlal Nehru Road and thence eastward by the southern limits of Park Street to Acharya Jagadish Chandra Bose Road, then crossing Acharya Jagadish Chandra Bose Road up to the south-east corner of the junction of Park Street and Acharya Jagadish Chandra Bose Road.

It is bordered on the east from the south-east corner of the junction of Park Street and Acharya Jagadish Chandra Bose Road (old Lower Circular Road), then southward by the eastern limits of the Acharya Jagadish Chandra Bose Road up to the south-east corner of the junction of Beck Bagan Row, Circus Avenue and Acharya Jagadish Chandra Bose Road.

It is bordered on the south from the south-east corner of the junction of Beck Bagan Row, Circus Avenue and Acharya Jagadish Chandra Bose Road (old Lower Circular Road), thence westward by the southern limits of Acharya Jagadish Chandra Bose Road to Jawaharlal Nehru Road (old Chowringhee Road), then crossing Jawaharlal Nehru Road up to the south-west corner of the junction of Acharya Jagadish Chandra Bose Road and Jawaharlal Nehru Road.

It is bordered on the west from the south-west corner of the junction of Acharya Jagadish Chandra Bose Road (old Lower Circular Road) and Jawaharlal Nehru Road (old Chowringhee Road). Thence north-ward by the western limits of Jawaharlal Nehru Road up to the south-west corner of the junction of Park Street, Outram Road and Jawaharlal Nehru Road.

See also - Shakespeare Sarani police district map

Tollygunge Women's police station has jurisdiction over all the police districts in the South Division, i.e. Park Street, Shakespeare Sarani, Alipore, Hastings, Maidan, Bhowanipore, Kalighat, Tollygunge, Charu Market, New Alipur and Chetla.
