= Abanindranath Thakur Sarani =

Road in Kolkata, India

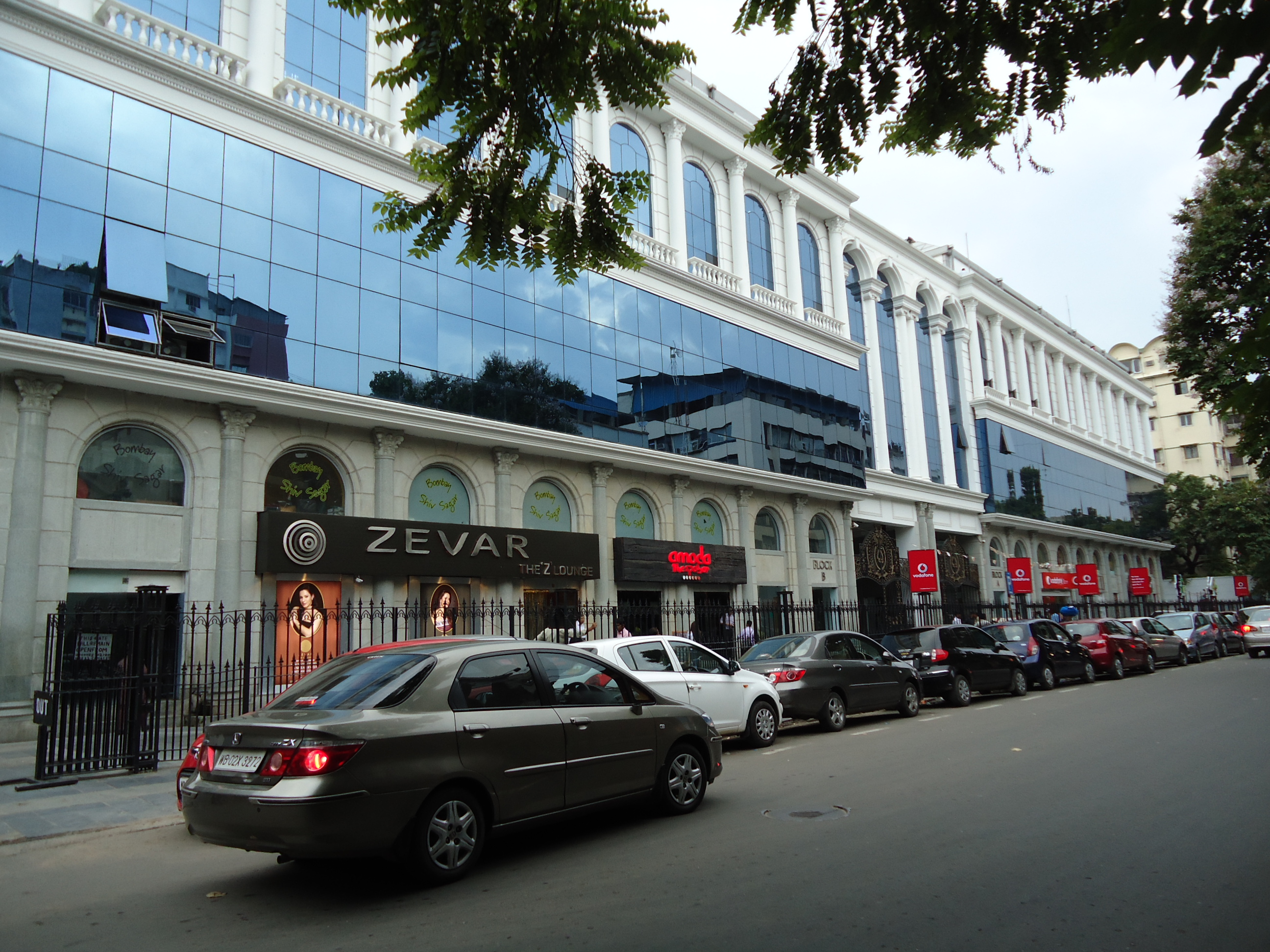
- Former name(s): Camac Street
- Maintained by: Kolkata Municipal Corporation
- Location: Kolkata, India
- Postal code: 700016, 700017, 700071
- Nearest Kolkata Metro station: Park Street, Maidan, Rabindra Sadan
- north end: Park Street
- south end: AJC Bose Road

Abanindranath Thakur Sarani (formerly and popularly known as Camac Street) is a one-way road in Kolkata, India. Running in the Kolkata CBD, it connects Allen Park at Park Street to Nizam Palace at Acharya Jagadish Chandra Bose Road. The road was named after William Camac, a senior merchant in the days of Lord Cornwallis and Lord Wellesley. According to Think India Think Retail 2023, Camac Street along with Park Street stands as the 5th best high street in India due to presence of many commercial establishments and high-end shopping destinations, with shopping malls, boutiques, restaurants and stand-alone stores.

It intersects Middleton Street and Shakespeare Sarani, two other important roads in the CBD. Several smaller roads like Middleton Row, Short Street, Victoria Terrace and Albert Road merge into Camac Street from the east or west.

== Gallery ==
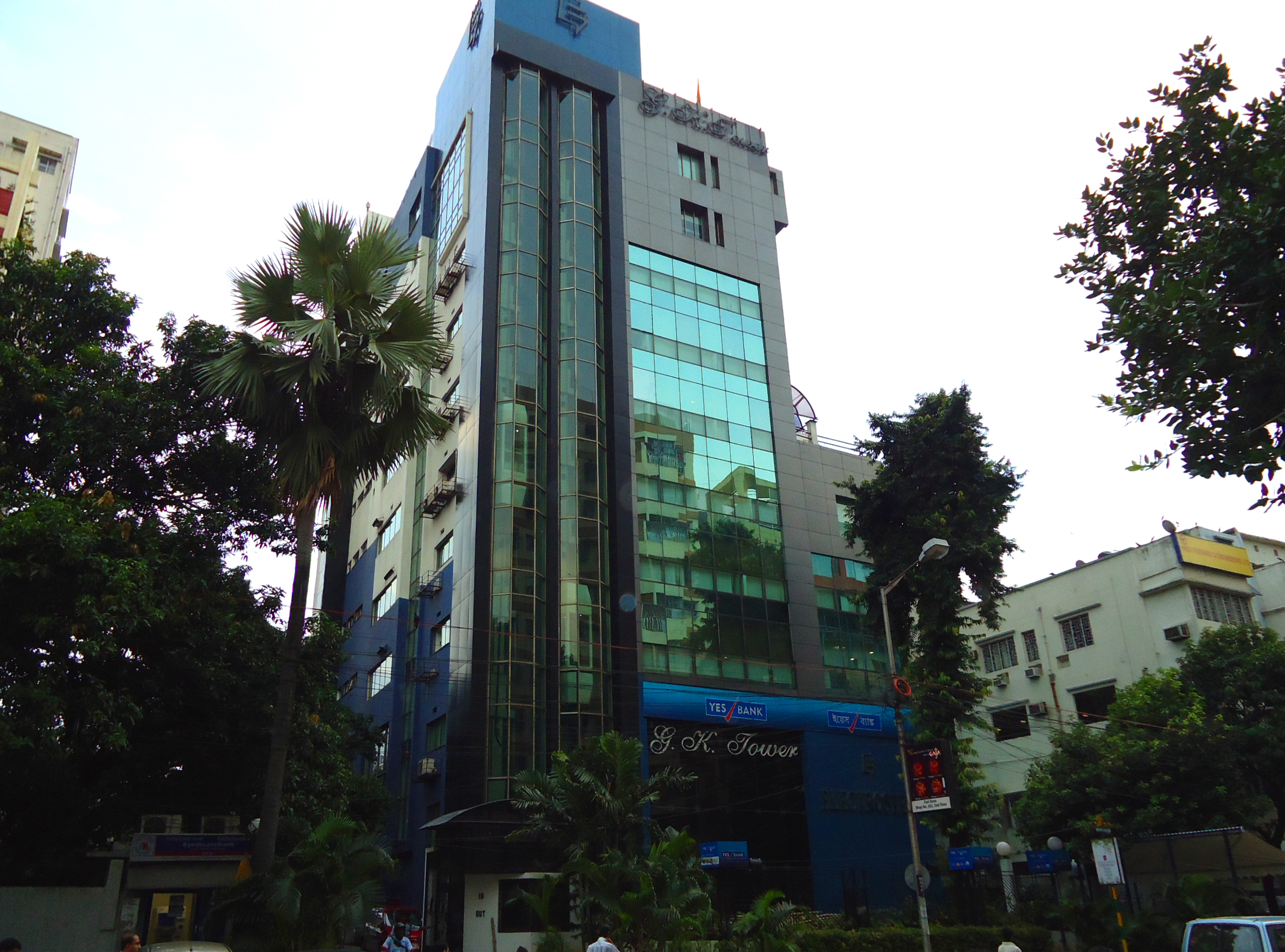
G.K. Tower, an office tower

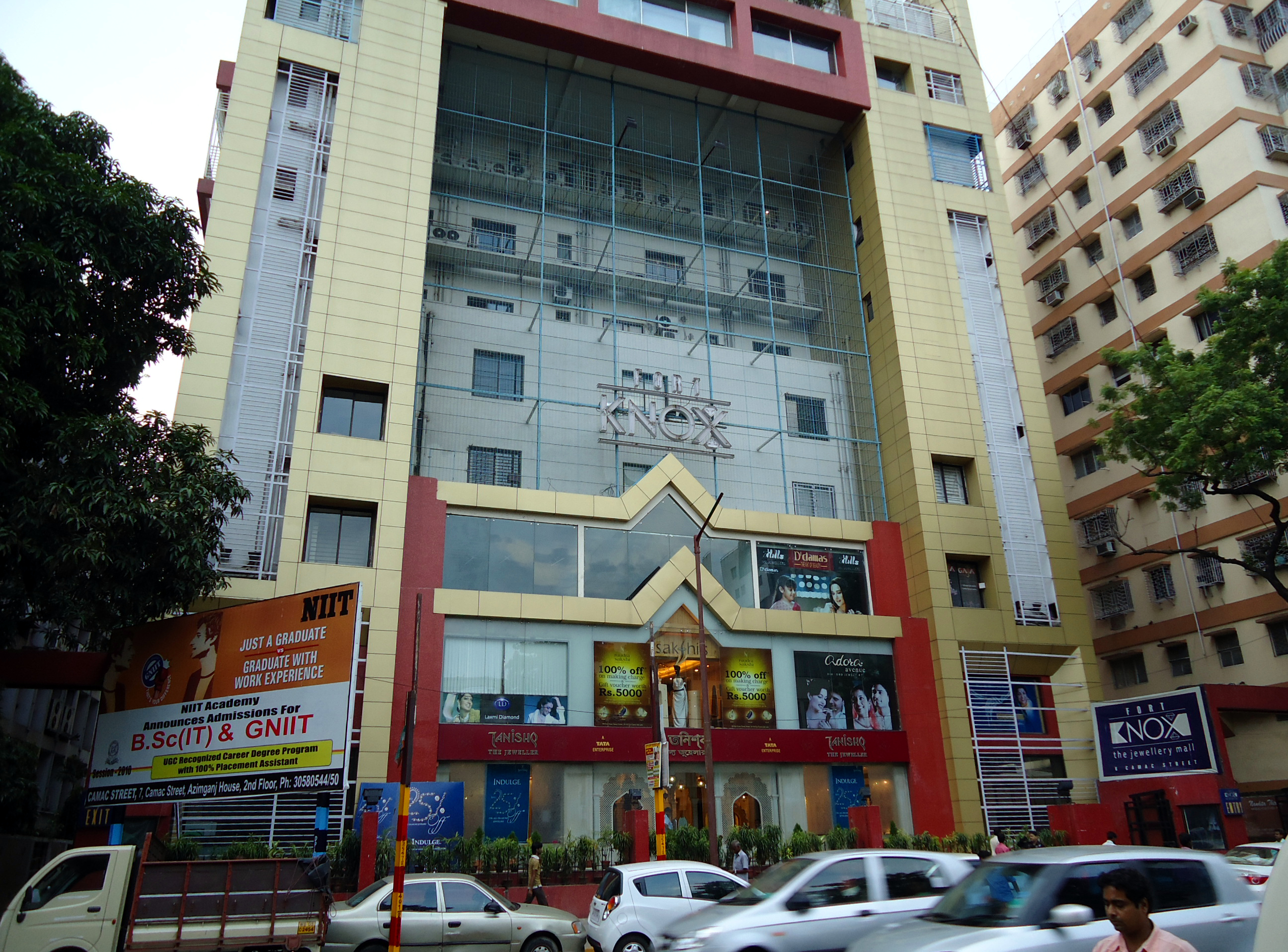
Fort Knox, jewellery mall

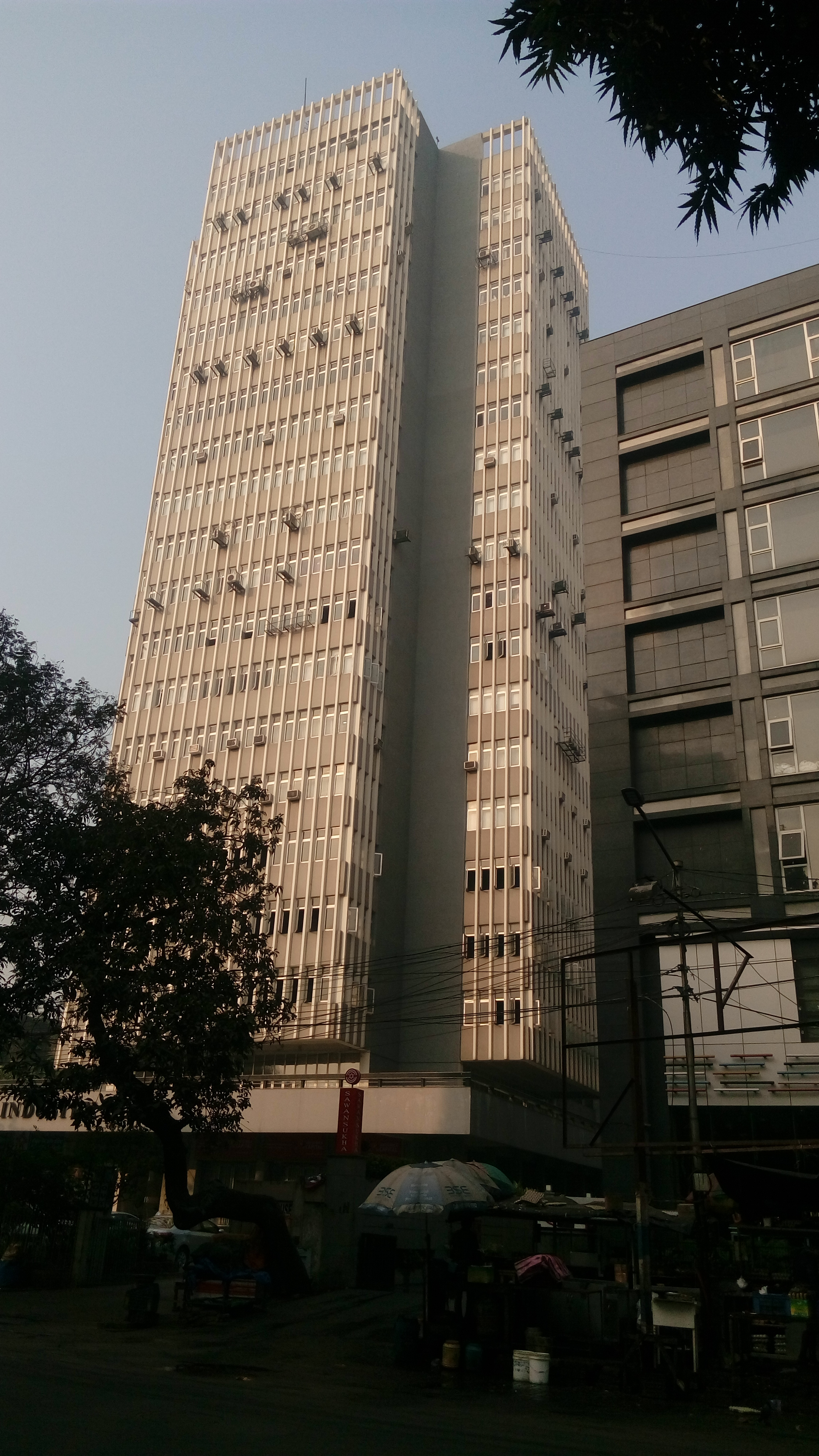
Kolkata Industry House

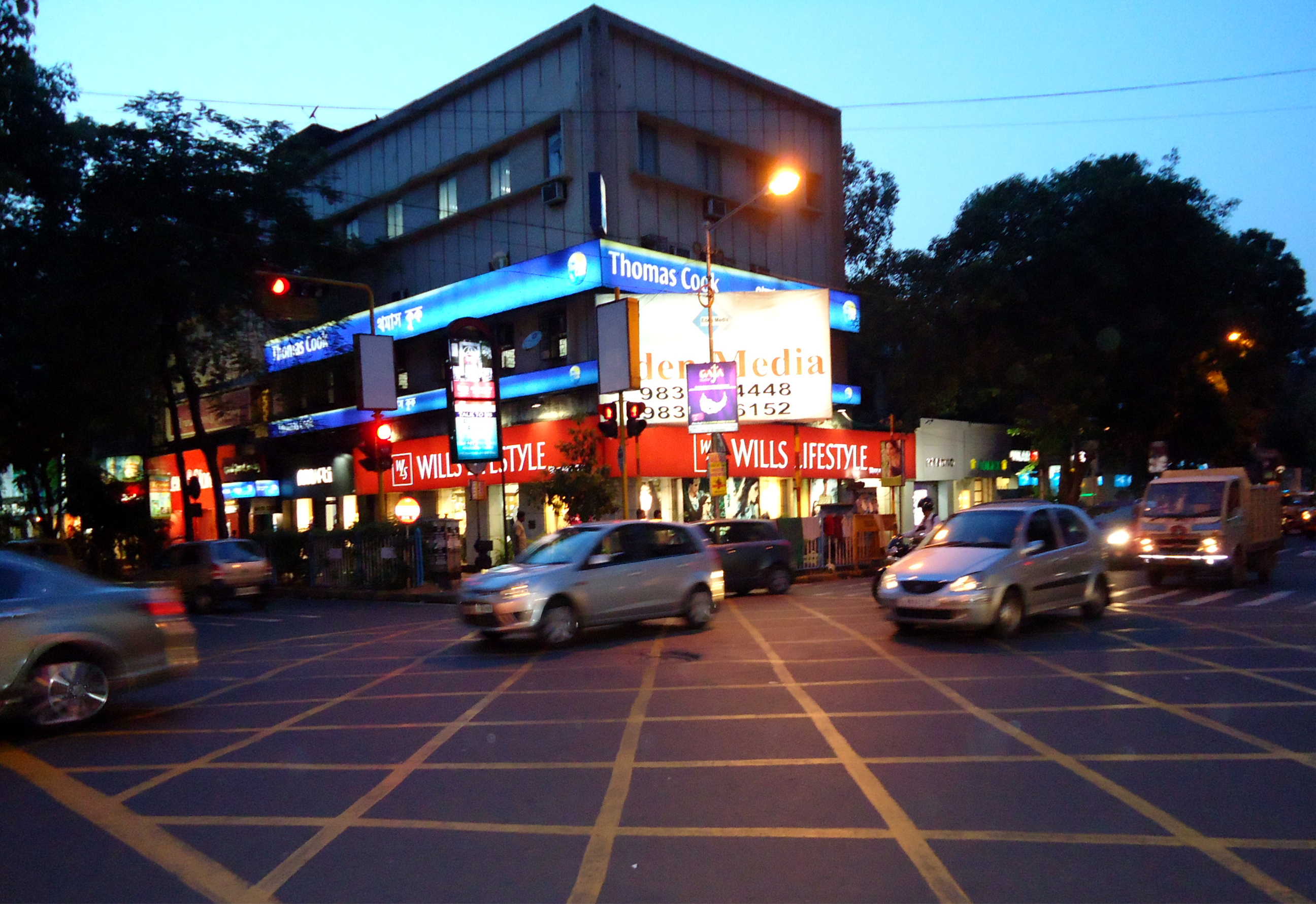
Camac Street and Shakespeare Sarani crossing
