= Neighbourhoods in the Kolkata metropolitan area =

Towns in municipal Kolkata

Coordinates: 22.5411°N 88.3378°E

The major municipal areas which are a part of the Kolkata Metropolitan Development Authority or KMDA Kolkata conurbation are:

Kolkata	North 24 Parganas	South 24 Parganas	Howrah	Hooghly	Nadia
Kolkata	Baranagar; Barasat; Barrackpore; Bhatpara; Bidhannagar; Dum Dum; Garulia; Halisahar; Kamarhati; Kanchrapara; Khardaha; Madhyamgram; Naihati; New Barrackpore; North Barrackpur; North Dumdum; Panihati; South Dumdum; Titagarh	Baruipur; Budge Budge; Jaynagar Majilpur; Maheshtala; Pujali; Rajpur Sonarpur	Howrah; Uluberia	Baidyabati; Bansberia; Bhadreswar; Champdani; Chandannagar; Dankuni; Hugli Chuchura; Konnagar; Rishra; Serampore; Uttarpara Kotrung	Gayespur; Haringhata; Kalyani

Many towns in Greater Kolkata are being incorporated within the Kolkata postal area, with their postal PIN codes being changed so that these areas can be identified with the larger metropolitan area.
