= Kolkata Race Course =

Race course in Kolkata, India

Coordinates: 22°32′39.52″N 88°20′11.34″E

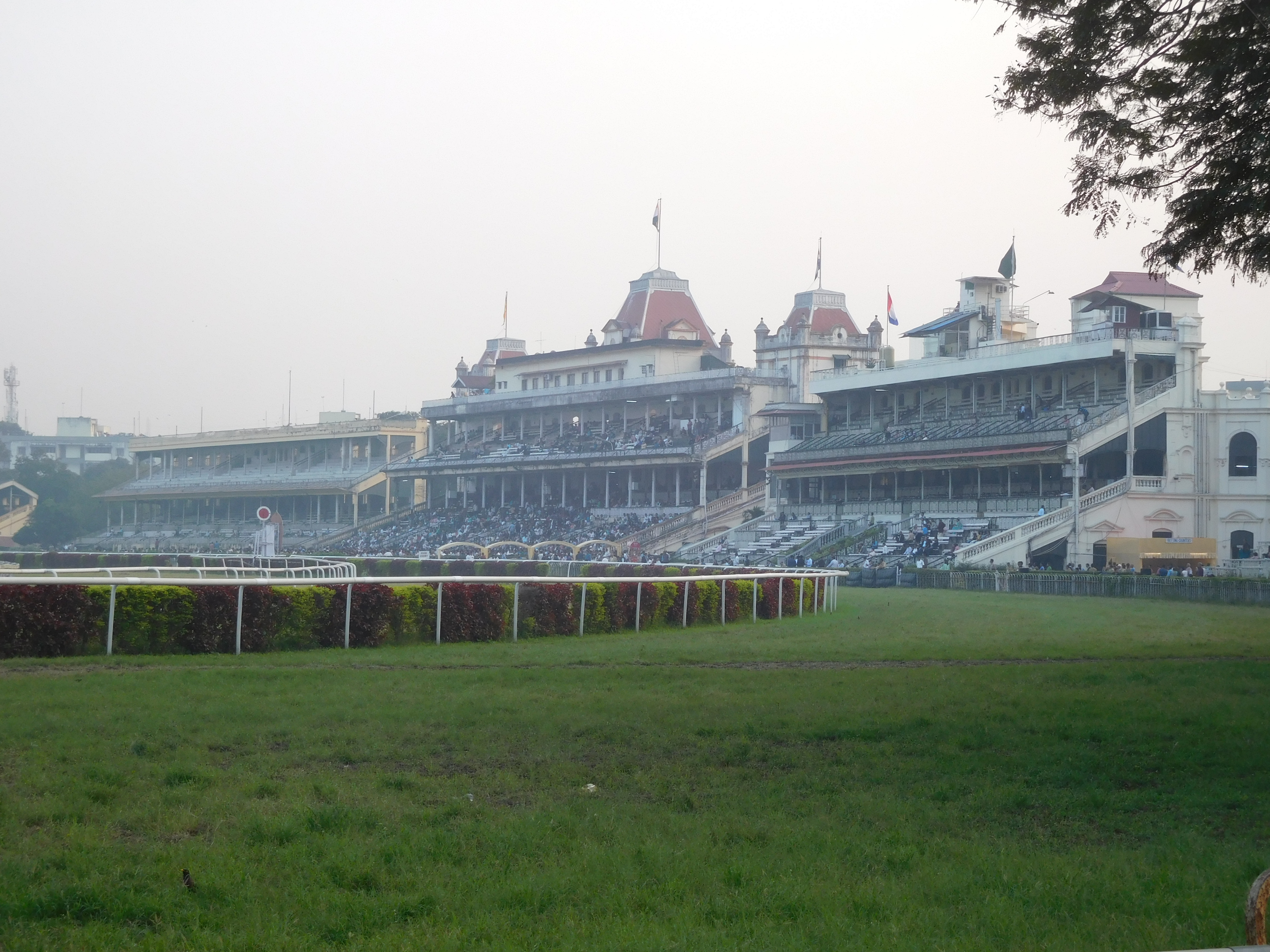
Kolkata Race Course

Kolkata Race Course is a horse race venue in Hastings, Kolkata, India. It is the largest horse race venue in India. The race course was built in 1820 and is maintained by the Royal Calcutta Turf Club.

The races are held from the month of July to September, and again from November to March. The races are usually held on Saturdays, and also on other public holidays.
