= List of tourist attractions in West Bengal =

Tourist attractions in West Bengal refers to the tourist attractions in the Indian state of West Bengal. West Bengal is a state in the eastern] region of India and is the nation's fourth-most populous. It is also the seventh-most populous sub-national entity in the world, with over 91 million inhabitants. It is bordered by the countries of Nepal, Bhutan, and Bangladesh, and the Indian states of Orissa, Jharkhand, Bihar, Sikkim, and Assam. The state capital is Calcutta. West Bengal encompasses two broad natural regions: the Gangetic Plain in the south and the sub-Himalayan and Himalayan area in the north. With these there are two major natural regions i.e., the Western plateau and the great Sundarban delta.

During the British colonial era from 1700 to 1912, Calcutta enjoyed the privilege of being the capital of British India and witnessed a spate of frenzied construction of buildings, largely influenced by the conscious intermingling of Neo-Gothic, Baroque, Neo-Classical, Oriental and Islamic schools of design. Unlike many north Indian cities, whose construction stresses minimalism, the layout of much of the architectural variety in Kolkata owes its origins to European styles and tastes imported by the British and, to a much lesser extent, by the Portuguese and French.

Calcutta - now the state capital, is considered to be an ideal hub to cover all the destinations in West Bengal. It is the largest urban center in Eastern India and is well connected by road, rail and air.

Siliguri - the largest city of North Bengal will be another ideal hub to cover all destinations in Northern Bengal and an alternative to Kolkata. This city is the second largest urban center in West Bengal and is also well connected by road, rail and air.

The following is a list of some of the attractions of West Bengal

== List ==
Attraction(s)	Location	Image
Darjeeling	Darjeeling	
Darjeeling Himalayan Railway (Toy Train)	New Jalpaiguri to Darjeeling	
Morgan House	Kalimpong	
Cooch Behar Palace	Cooch Behar	
Dooars	Dooars	
Jaldapara National Park	Alipurduar district	
Gorumara National Park	Jalpaiguri district	
Hazarduari Palace	Murshidabad district (Murshidabad)	
Basirhat-Taki	North 24 Parganas	
Nizamat Imambara	Murshidabad district	
Adina Deer Park	Malda district	
Tarakeswar Temple	Hooghly District	
Gaur	Maldah	
Bangarh	Gangarampur	
Shantiniketan	Birbhum	
Bishnupur Terracotta Temples	Bankura	
Acharya Jagadish Chandra Bose Indian Botanic Garden	Howrah (Shibpur)	
The Great Banyan Tree	Howrah (Shibpur)	
Howrah Bridge	Howrah to Kolkata	
B. B. D. Bagh	Kolkata	
Dakshineswar Kali Temple	North 24 Parganas district (Dakshineswar)	
Second Hooghly Bridge	Kolkata to Howrah	
Belur Math	Howrah (Belur Math)	
Victoria Memorial	Kolkata	
Sundarbans delta of India	Southern 24 Parganas District	
Digha	Purba Medinipur	
Mandarmani	Purba Medinipur	
St. Paul's Cathedral	Kolkata	
Sundarbans National Park	Sundarbans delta of India	
Mayapur	Nabadwip	
Kumortuli	North Kolkata	
Salt Lake Stadium	Bidhannagar	
Howrah station	Howrah	
Eden Gardens	Kolkata	
Hangseshwari Temple	Hugli	

West Bengal stretches to the Bay of Bengal in the south. The coastal strip of West Bengal, extending from the Gangetic Delta to the border of Orissa has some beautiful coastal settlements namely Digha, Shankarpur, Mandarmani, Bakkhali, Gangasagara, Tajpur and more others.

Tourist attractions also include some more geographical indications like Nakshi kantha (handicraft), Darjeeling tea (agricultural), Santipore Saree (handicraft), Shantiniketan Leather Goods (handicraft), Fazli Mango (agricultural), Khirsapati or Himsagar mango (agricultural), Laxman Bhog mango (agricultural), Baluchari Saree (handicraft), and Dhaniakhali saree (handicraft).

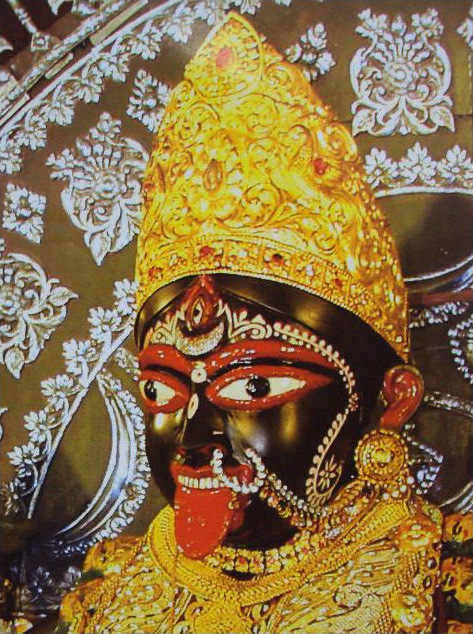
Face of the idol of Goddess Bhavatarini from the Dakshineshwar Kali Temple

Other attractions include the culture of West Bengal. It attracts tourists for pilgrimages to the holy places of different religions. People from different sections of the world come to West Bengal for holy pilgrimage as Kolkata is one of the four Adi Shakta pithas. Among the other 52 Shakta pithas some are located in West Bengal. The notable Hindu temples include Kalighat Kali Temple, Tarapith, Belur Math, Mayapur ISKCON Temple, Hangseshwari Temple, Tarakeshwar Temple, Thakurnagar Thakur Bari Temple and Dakshineswar Kali Temple.

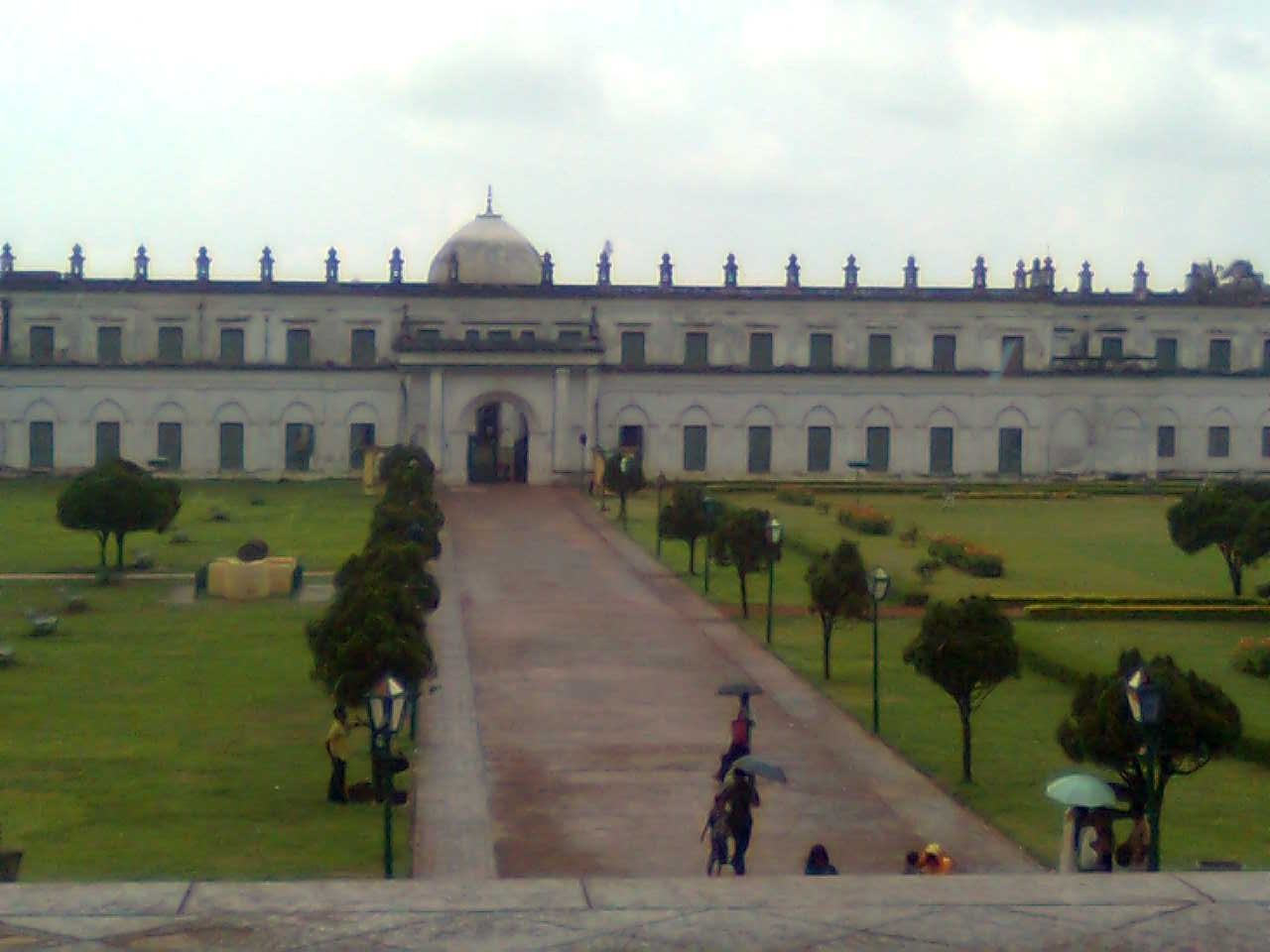
The Nizamat Imambara is the largest one in India and Bengal

West Bengal also has countless mosques like the Nizamat Imambara and Katra Mosque in Murshidabad, Furfura Sharif and Tipu Sultan Shahi Mosque in Kolkata.

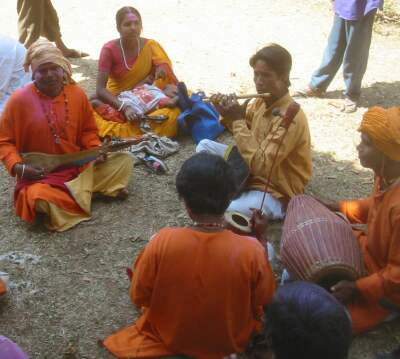
Baul singers at Basanta-Utsab, Shantiniketan

Other pilgrim destinations include Gurdwaras for Sikhs and churches like the Basilica of the Holy Rosary in Bandel, St. John's Church, St. James Church (Jora Girja), St. Paul's Cathedral and Church of the Lord Jesus.

Buddhist Monasteries in West Bengal are especially located in the hilly regions like the Ghoom Monastery, Bhutia Busty Monastery, Mag-Dhog Yolmowa Monastery, Tharpa Choling Monastery, Zang Dhok Palri Phodang and more others.

Notable festivals include the Durga Puja in October, the most popular festival in the West Bengal, the Poila Baishakh (the Bengali New Year), the Rathayatra, the Dolyatra or Basanta-Utsab, the Nobanno, the Poush Parbon (festival of Poush), the Kali Puja, the Saraswati Puja, the Laxmi Puja, Christmas, the Eid ul-Fitr, the Eid ul-Adha and the Muharram. Buddha Purnima, which marks the birth of Gautama Buddha, is one of the most important Hindu/Buddhist festivals while Christmas, called Bôŗodin (Great day) in Bengali is celebrated by the minority Christian population. Poush Mela is a popular festival of Shantiniketan, taking place in winter.

Being home to notable people like Rabindranath Tagore, Asia's first Nobel laureate and composer of India's national anthem and Swami Vivekananda, a key figure in introducing Vedanta and Yoga in Europe and USA there houses and residencies like Shantiniketan and Jorasanko Thakur Bari are world famous and attract many tourists.

West Bengal also has a long tradition of popular literature, music and drama largely based on Bengali folklore and Hindu epics and Puranas.

Kolkata, the state capital city, was also the workplace of several social reformers, like Raja Ram Mohan Ray, Iswar Chandra Vidyasagar, and Swami Vivekananda. These social reforms have eventually led to a cultural atmosphere where practices like sati, dowry, and caste-based discrimination or untouchability, the evils that crept into the Hindu society, were abolished.

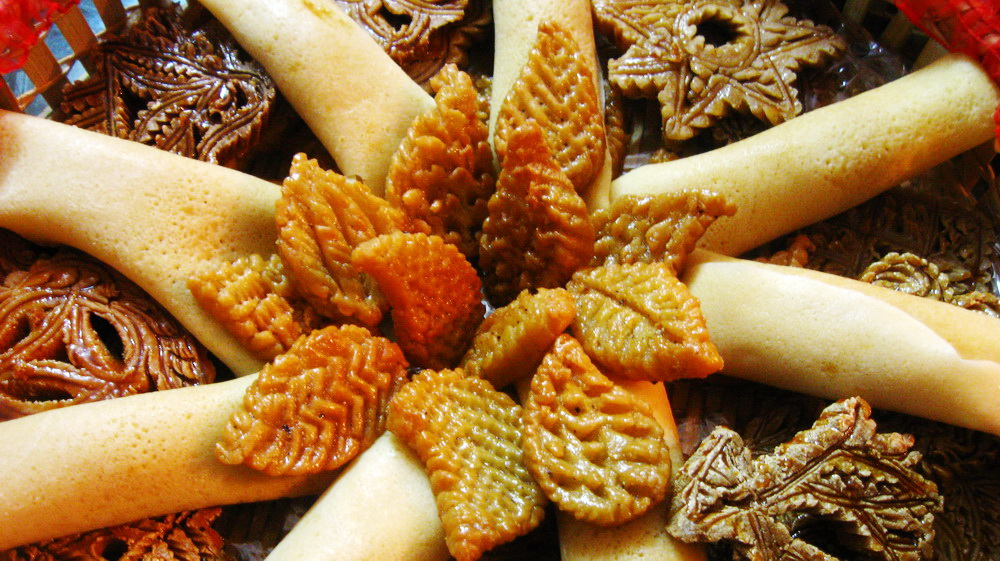
Patisapta - A kind of Pitha; which is a popular sweet dish in West Bengal during winter.

West Bengal is also known to make distinctive sweetmeats from milk products, including Rôshogolla, Chômchôm, Kalojam and several kinds of sondesh. Pitha, a kind of sweet cake, bread or dimsum are specialties of winter season. Sweets like coconut-naru, til-naru, moa, payesh, etc. are prepared during the festival of Lakshmi puja. Popular street food includes Aloor Chop, Beguni, Kati roll, and phuchka.

The variety of fruits and vegetables that Bengal has to offer is incredible. West Bengal is also famous for its costumes.

Seven wonders of West Bengal

NDTV along with the Ministry of Tourism, Government of India conducted a nationwide campaign for searching the "Seven Wonders of India in 2008-09. The campaign started with shortlisting 200 places from all of the Indian states and then inviting public to cast their vote for their favorite places. It also included seven wonders of particular states. In West Bengal a total 13 were selected of which the "Seven Wonders of West Bengal" were shortlisted. The list of the 30 selected places are as follows:

- Cooch Behar Palace
- Darjeeling Himalayan Railway ("Toy Train")
- Hazarduari Palace
- Adina Mosque
- Gaur, West Bengal
- Shantiniketan
- Bishnupur Terracotta Temples
- Acharya Jagadish Chandra Bose Indian Botanic Garden with the Great Banyan Tree
- Howrah Bridge
- B. B. D. Bagh (formerly called Dalhousie Square)
- Dakshineswar Kali Temple
- Second Hooghly Bridge
- Victoria Memorial
- Sundarbans
- St. Paul's Cathedral

The shortlisted list, compiling of the "Seven Wonders of West Bengal" as per the votings is as follows:

- Sundarbans
- Victoria Memorial
- Darjeeling Himalayan Railway ("Toy Train")
- Bishnupur Terracotta Temples
- Acharya Jagadish Chandra Bose Indian Botanic Garden with the Great Banyan Tree
- Howrah Bridge
- B. B. D. Bagh (Formerly called, the Dalhousie Square) Mk.

== See also ==
- Tourism in North East India
- West Bengal
- Places of interest in Kolkata
- Tourism in West Bengal
- West Bengal Tourism Development Corporation
- Tourism in India
