= Tourism in West Bengal =

West Bengal is a state in the eastern region of India and is the nation's fourth-most populous state. The state capital is Kolkata. The state encompasses two broad natural regions: the Gangetic Plain in the south and the sub-Himalayan and Himalayan area in the north. The tourism in West Bengal is maintained by WBTDCL, a state government owned enterprise.

West Bengal is located on the eastern bottleneck of India stretching from the Himalayas in the north to the Bay of Bengal in the south. Some of India's most preferred travel destinations like; the Darjeeling Himalayan hill region in the northern extreme of the state, the highest peak of the state Sandakphu (3,636 m or 11,929 ft) and the Sundarbans mangrove forests in the extreme south.

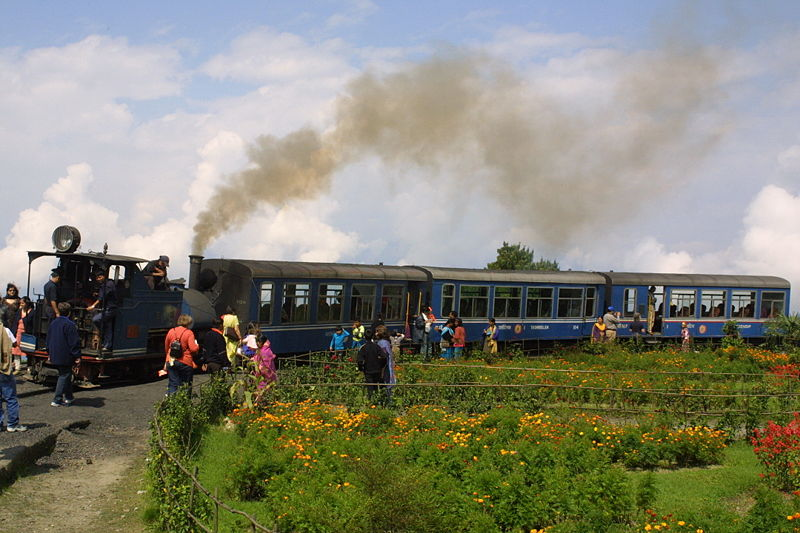
Darjeeling Himalayan Railway or Toy Train is West Bengal's third wonder

During the British colonial era from 1700 to 1912, Kolkata was the capital of British India and witnessed a spate of frenzied construction of buildings, largely influenced by the conscious intermingling of Neo-Gothic, Baroque, Neo-Classical, Oriental and Islamic schools of design. Unlike many north Indian cities, whose construction stresses minimalism, the layout of much of the architectural variety in Kolkata owes its origins to European styles and tastes imported by the British and to a much lesser extent, by the Portuguese and French.

Currently Bollywood star Shah Rukh Khan is the brand ambassador of West Bengal Tourism. The promotional films on West Bengal starring Shah Rukh Khan have been directed by Indian National Award winning filmmaker Aniruddha Roy Chowdhury.

== Architectural and geographical ==
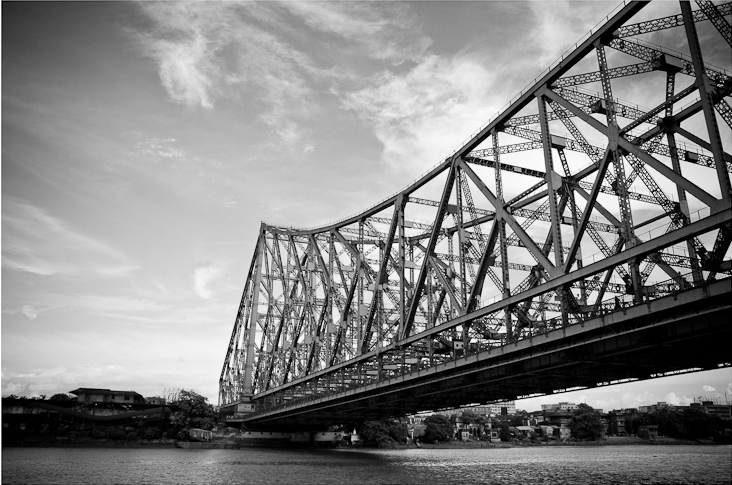
Howrah Bridge

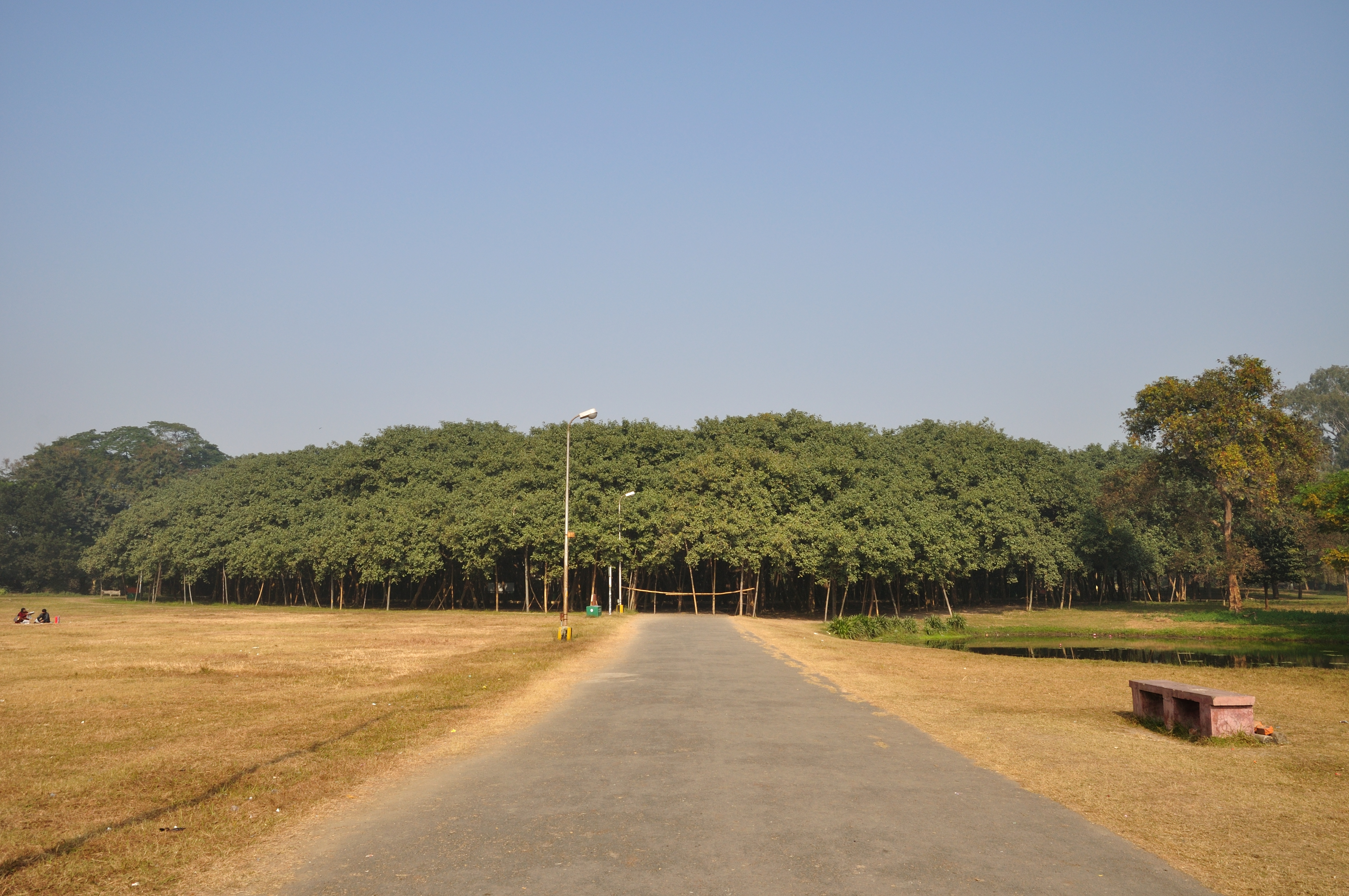
The Great Banyan Tree as a whole

The state of West Bengal has significant architectural and natural heritage. The capital of the state, Kolkata is also known as the "City of Palaces". It is also known as the "City of Joy" as coined by French author Dominique Lappierre through his synonymous book. West Bengal is famous for its terracotta temples of Bishnupur.

Hazarduari Palace, a tourist attraction, is known to have the second largest chandelier in the world and also the largest staircase in India. This three-storey palace was built in 1837 by Duncan McLeod for Nawab Nazim Humaun Jah, the then Nawab of Bengal. The palace was built in the Indo-European style. It derives its name from the thousand doors in the palace (among which only 900 are real). In 1985, the palace was handed over to the Archaeological Survey of India (ASI) for better preservation. The Hazarduari Palace Museum is regarded as the biggest site museum of ASI and has 20 displayed galleries containing 4742 antiquities, 1034 of which are displayed for the public. They include various weapons, oil paintings of Dutch, French and Italian artists, marble statues, rare books, old maps, land revenue records and palanquins (mostly belonging to 18th and 19th centuries). Cooch Behar Palace built in 1887, was designed on the model of Buckingham Palace in London, during the reign of Maharaja Nripendra Narayan.

The Victoria Memorial, Howrah Bridge (Rabindra Setu) and the Second Hooghly Bridge (Vidyasagar Setu) are iconic of Kolkata. Aside from colonial and heritage buildings, there are also high rising monuments and skyscrapers in the city. There are also a couple of cemeteries established by the British when Kolkata was the capital of British India. These include the South Park Street Cemetery and Scottish Cemetery.

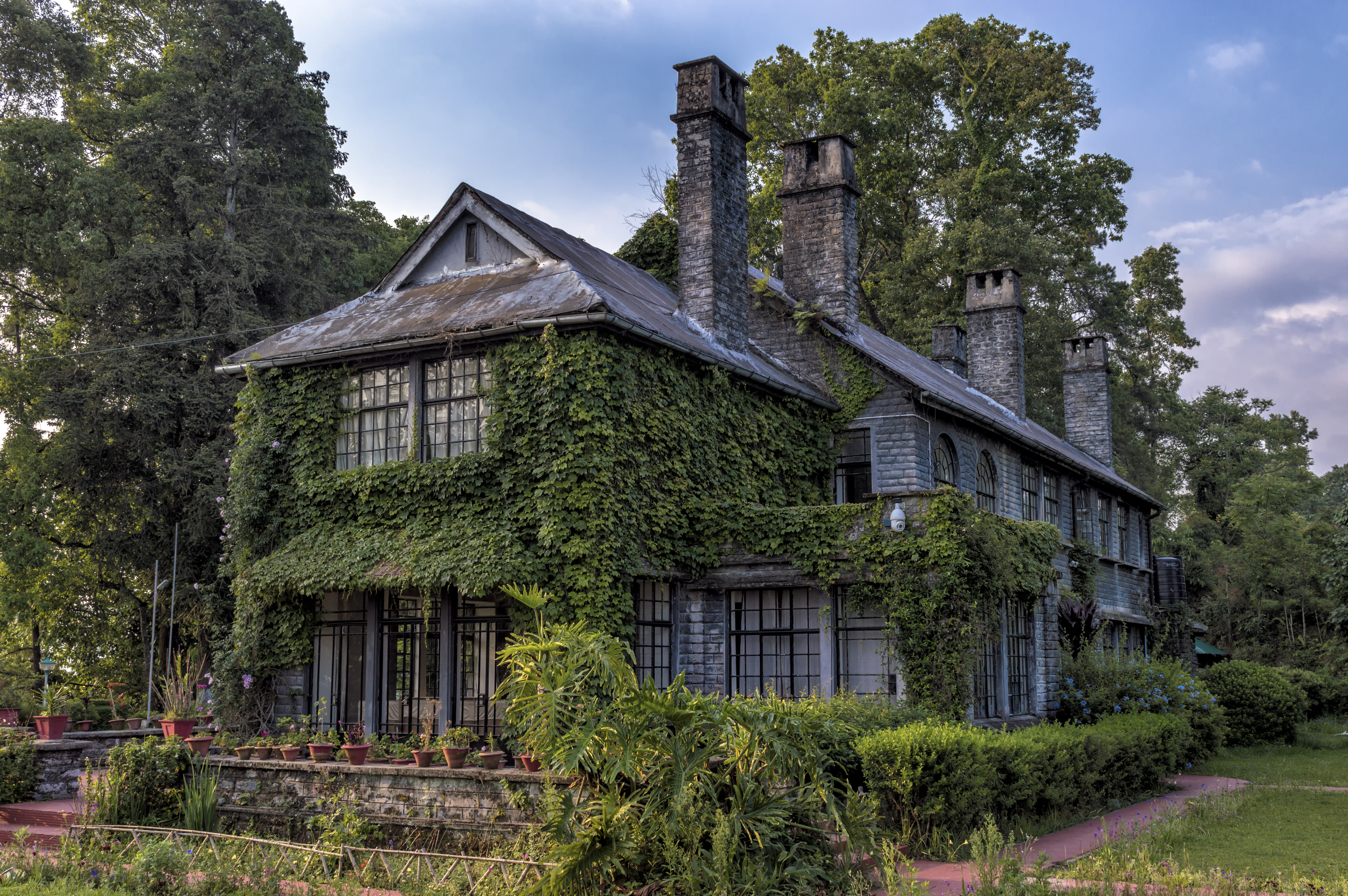
Morgan House is a classic example of colonial architecture in Kalimpong

The River Ganga flows through the state. World heritage sites in West Bengal include the Darjeeling Himalayan Railway and the Sundarbans National Park. Neora Valley National Park, which is one of the richest biological zones in the entire Northeast, situated in the Kalimpong subdivision under Darjeeling District, is in West Bengal.

The Ganges Delta (also known as the Ganges–Brahmaputra Delta, the Sunderbans Delta, or the Bengalla Delta) is in the South Asia region of Bengal, consisting of West Bengal and its neighbouring country of Bangladesh. It is the world's largest delta, and empties into the Bay of Bengal. It is one of the most fertile regions in the world, thus earning the nickname "The Green Delta". It stretches from the Hooghly River on the west to the Meghna River on the east. It is approximately 350 km (220 mi) across at the Bay of Bengal. Kolkata and Haldia are the principal Indian seaports on the delta.

The Acharya Jagadish Chandra Bose Indian Botanic Garden or Calcutta Botanical Garden (previously known as Indian Botanic Garden) is the largest and oldest reserve of greeneries of its kind in Southeast Asia. It is also a premier institution for botanical and horticultural research in India. The garden is situated on the west bank of the River Hooghly in Shibpur, Howrah, nearly 8 km from center of city Kolkata. Located here is the Great Banyan Tree. It was the widest tree in the world in terms of the area of its canopy and is estimated to be about 200 to 250 years old. It became diseased after it was struck by lightning, so in 1925 the middle of the tree was excised to keep the remainder healthy.

West Bengal also has some more geographical indications like Nakshi Kantha (handicraft), Darjeeling tea (agricultural), Santipore saree (handicraft), Shantiniketan leather goods (handicraft), Fazli mango (agricultural), Khirsapati or Himsagar mango (agricultural), Laxman Bhog mango (agricultural), Baluchari saree (handicraft) and Dhaniakhali saree (handicraft).

== Sea beaches ==
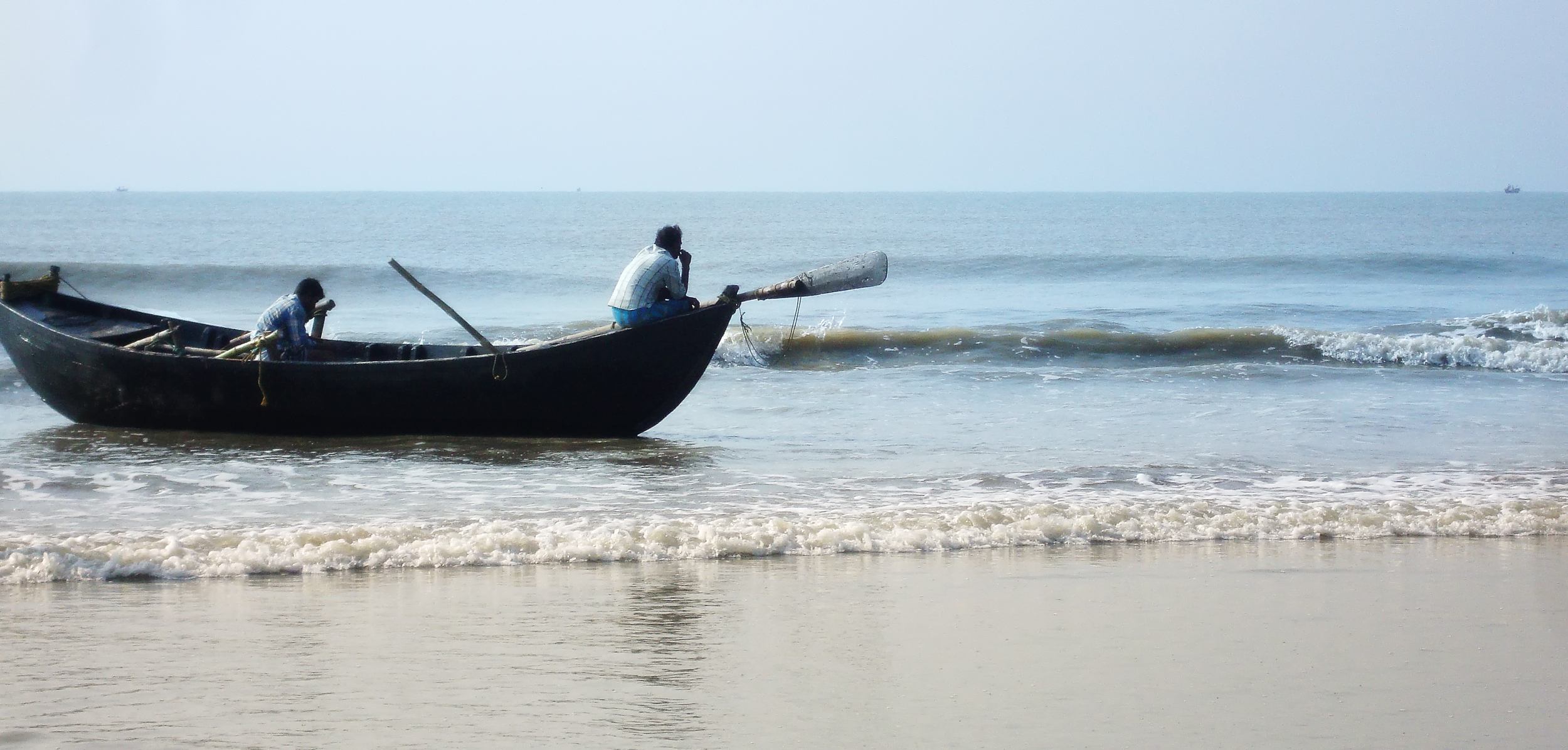
Mandarmani Sea Beach

West Bengal stretches to the Bay of Bengal in the south. The coastal strip of West Bengal, extending from the Gangetic Delta to the border of Odisha, has some scenic coastal settlements, such as Digha, Shankarpur, Mandarmani, Bakkhali, Gangasagar and Tajpur. Some of these have beaches which are hard enough for cars to drive on.

== Hill stations ==
There are many hill stations in North West Bengal, of which Darjeeling is world-famous. Others are Kurseong, Kalimpong, Rimbick, Lava and Loleygaon, Mirik and Sandakfu. Bagmundi is also famous among tourist, it is situated in Southern Part of West Bengal

== Wildlife sanctuaries and national parks ==
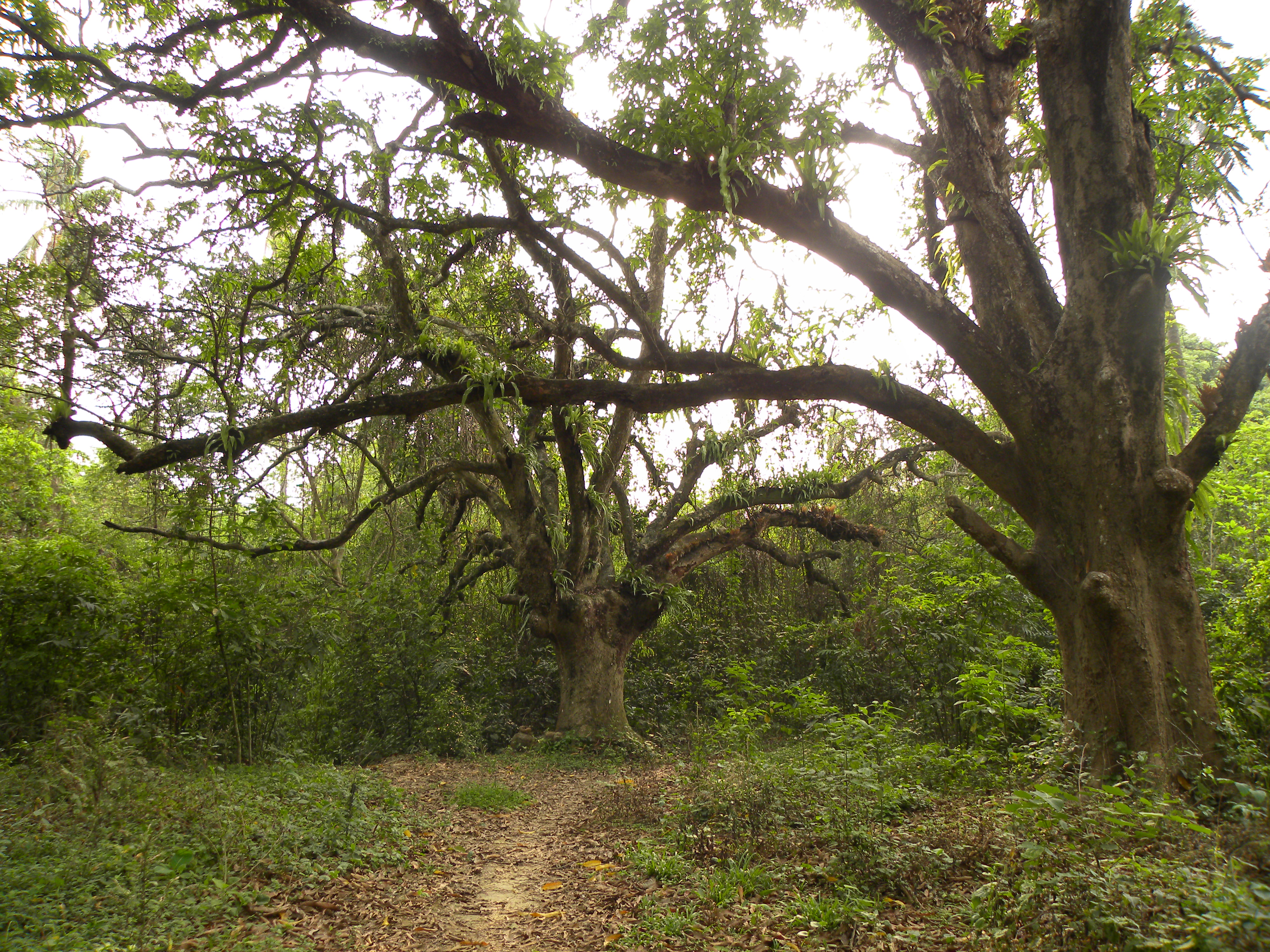
Chintamani Kar Bird Sanctuary.

West Bengal has 3.26% of its geographical area under protected areas comprising 15 wildlife sanctuaries and 5 national parks – Sundarbans National Park, Buxa Tiger Reserve, Gorumara National Park, Neora Valley National Park, Singalila National Park, and Jaldapara National Park. West Bengal also has wildlife sanctuaries and bird sanctuaries like Chintamani Kar Bird Sanctuary and Raiganj Wildlife Sanctuary.

== Flora and fauna ==
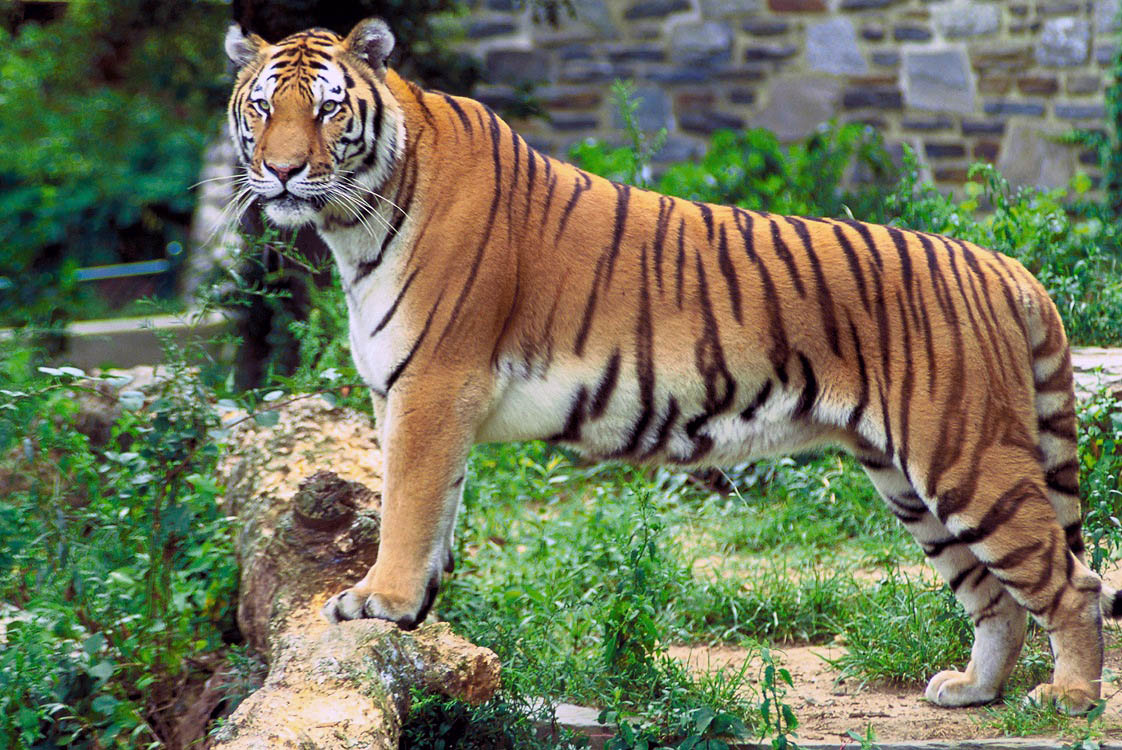
A Bengal tiger

As of 2009, recorded forest area in the state is 11,879 km^{2} (4,587 sq mi) which is 13.38% of the state's geographical area, compared to the national average of 21.02%. Part of the world's largest mangrove forest, the Sundarbans, is located in southern West Bengal.

The southern part of West Bengal can be divided into two regions: the Gangetic plain and the littoral mangrove forests of the Sundarbans. The coastal region of Purba Medinipur exhibits coastal vegetation. A notable tree from the Sundarbans is the ubiquitous sundari (Heritiera fomes), from which the forest gets its name.

The distribution of vegetation in northern West Bengal is dictated by elevation and precipitation. For example, the foothills of the Himalayas, the Dooars, are densely wooded with Sal and other tropical evergreen trees. However, above an elevation of 1,000 metres (3,300 ft), the forest becomes predominantly subtropical. In Darjeeling, which is above 1,500 metres (4,900 ft), temperate-forest trees such as oaks, conifers, and rhododendrons predominate.

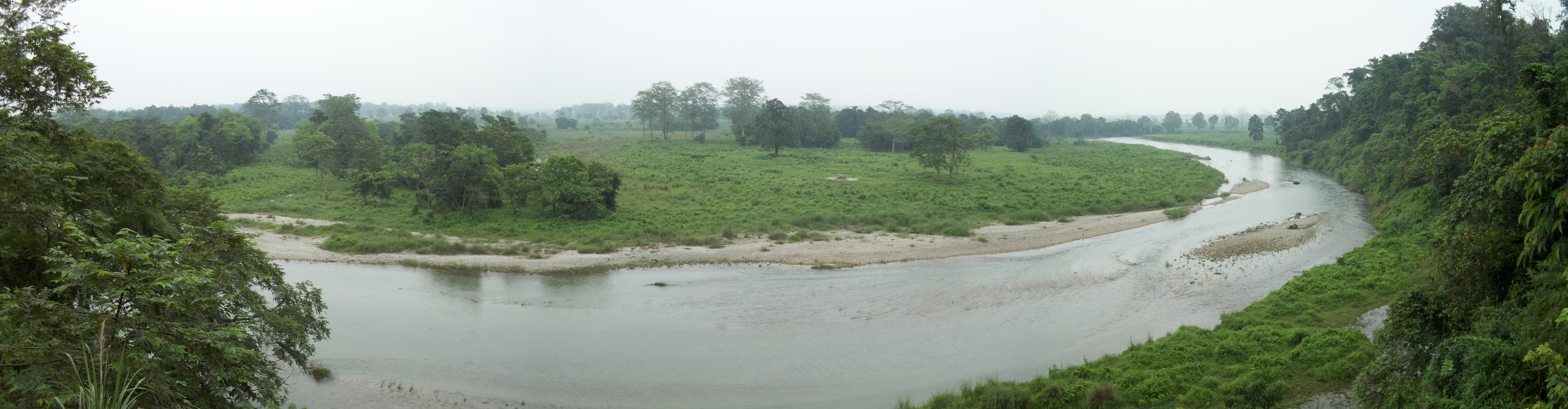
Gorumara National Park Panorama from Jatraprosad watch tower

Wildlife include Indian rhinoceros, Indian elephant, deer, bison, leopard, gaur, tiger and crocodiles, as well as many bird species. Migratory birds come to the state during the winter. The high-altitude forests of Singalila National Park shelter barking deer, red panda, chinkara, takin, serow, pangolin, minivet and Kalij pheasants. The Sundarbans are noted for a reserve project conserving the endangered Bengal tiger, although the forest hosts many other endangered species, such as the Gangetic dolphin, river terrapin and estuarine crocodile. The mangrove forest also acts as a natural fish nursery, supporting coastal fishes along the Bay of Bengal. Recognizing its special conservation value, Sundarban area has been declared as a Biosphere Reserve.

== Culture ==
The culture of West Bengal attracts tourists from around the world. It has its roots in literature, music, fine arts, drama and cinema. The Darjeeling Himalayan hill region shows a different cultural aspect. Rabindranath Tagore is Asia's first Nobel laureate and composer of India's national anthem. Swami Vivekananda was a key figure in introducing Vedanta and Yoga in Europe and the USA. They all belong from West Bengal, and their houses and residencies like Shantiniketan and Jorasanko Thakur Bari attract many tourists.

West Bengal also has a long tradition of popular literature, music and drama largely based on Bengali folklore and Hindu epics and Puranas.

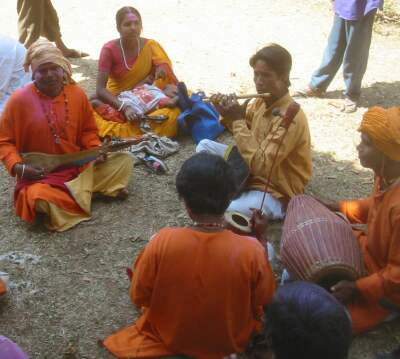
Baul singers at Basanta-Utsab, Shantiniketan

The Baul tradition is a unique heritage of Bengali folk music, which has also been influenced by regional music traditions. Other folk music forms include Gombhira and Bhawaiya. Folk music in West Bengal is often accompanied by the ektara, a one-stringed instrument. West Bengal also has a heritage in North Indian classical music. "Rabindrasangeet", songs composed and set into tune by Rabindranath Tagore, and "Nazrul geeti" (by Kazi Nazrul Islam) are popular. Also prominent are other musical forms like Dwijendralal, Atulprasad and Rajanikanta's songs and "adhunik" or modern music from films and other composers.

However, since the early 1990s, there has been an emergence and popularisation of new genres of music, including fusions of Baul and jazz by several Bangla bands, as well as the emergence of Jeebonmukhi Gaan (a modern genre based on realism). Bengali dance forms draw from folk traditions, especially those of the tribal groups, as well as the broader Indian dance traditions. Chau dance of Purulia is a rare form of mask dance. West Bengal is known for Bengali folk music such as baul and kirtans and gajan, and modern songs including Bengali "adhunik" (modern) songs.

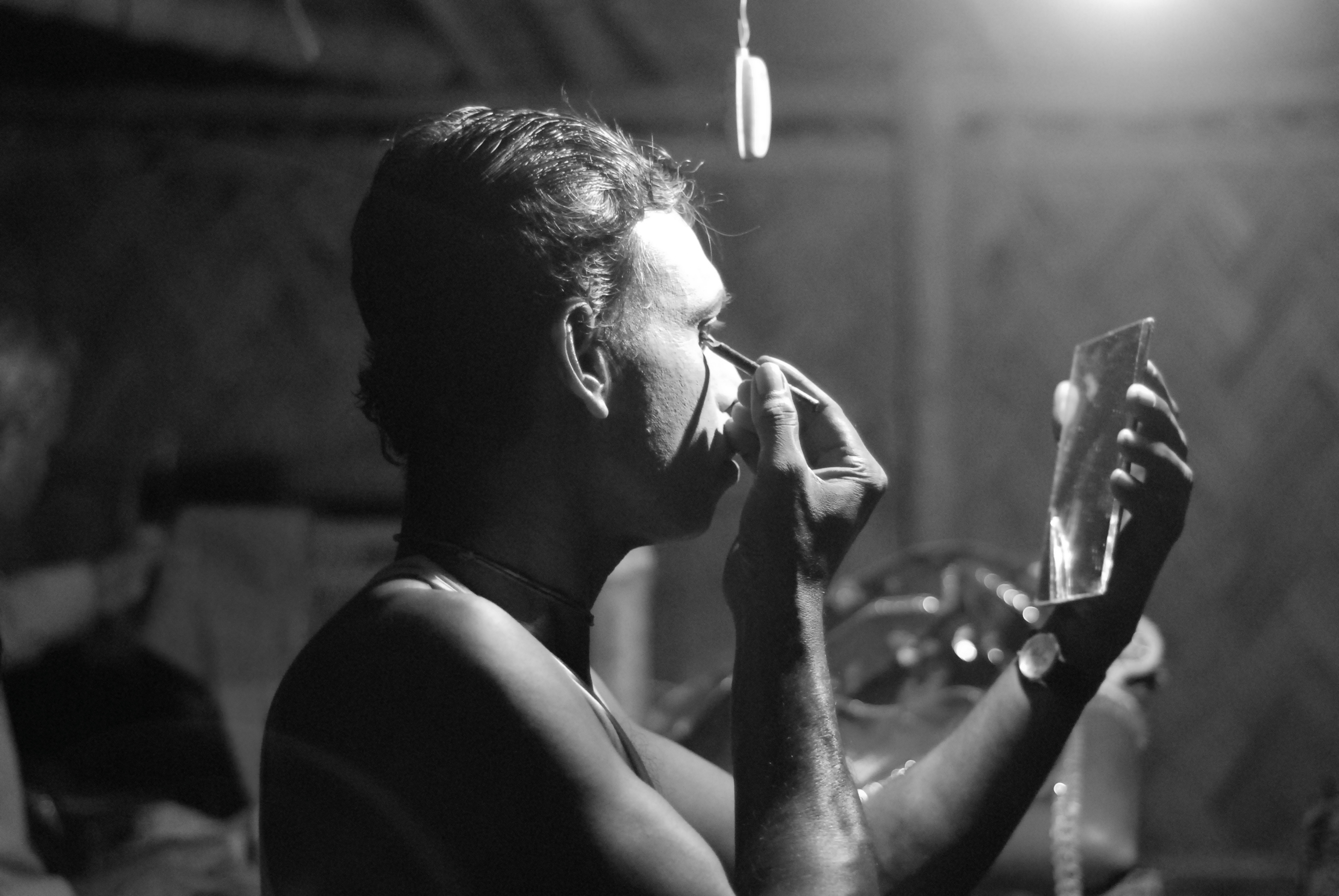
A jatra actor prepares before the performance, Sunderbans

The state is home to a thriving cinema industry, dubbed "Tollywood". Tollygunje in Kolkata is the location of numerous Bengali movie studios, and the name "Tollywood" (similar to Hollywood and Bollywood) is derived from that name. The Bengali film industry is well known for its art films, and has produced acclaimed directors like Satyajit Ray and actors like Uttam Kumar and singers like Arijit Singh.

Among other types of theatre, West Bengal has a tradition of folk drama known as jatra.

West Bengal has been the harbinger of modernism in fine arts.

Kolkata was also the workplace of several social reformers, like Raja Ram Mohan Ray, Iswar Chandra Vidyasagar and Swami Vivekananda. These social reforms have eventually led to a cultural atmosphere where practices like sati, dowry and caste-based discrimination or untouchability, the evils that crept into the Hindu society, were abolished.

Kumortuli is a famous tourist attraction in Kolkata. It is traditionally a potters' quarter in North Kolkata. By virtue of their artistic productions these potters have moved from obscurity to prominence. This Kolkata neighbourhood not only supplies clay idols of Hindu gods and goddesses to barowari pujas in Kolkata and its neighbourhoods, but also exports a number of idols. It is one of the seven wonders in Kolkata. Bengal is also well known for its variety of handwoven Sarees. It is home to exquisite sarees such as Jamdani Sarees, Baluchari Sarees, Kantha stitch Sarees, Tussar Silk Sarees, Muslin Sarees and Matka Sarees. These variety of handwoven sarees in a single place is a rarity in today's modern times.

== Cuisine ==
Rice and fish are traditional favourite foods, leading to a saying in Bengali, machhe bhate bangali (Bengali language:মাছে ভাতে বাঙালী) that translates as "fish and rice make a Bengali". Bengal's vast repertoire of fish-based dishes includes hilsa preparations, a favourite among Bengalis. There are numerous ways of cooking fish depending on the texture, size, fat content and bones.

Sweets occupy an important place in the diet of Bengalis and at their social ceremonies. It is an ancient custom among both Hindu and Muslim Bengalis to distribute sweets during festivities. The confectionery industry has flourished because of its close association with social and religious ceremonies. Competition and changing tastes have helped to create many new sweets. Bengalis make distinctive sweetmeats from milk products, including rôshogolla, chômchôm, kalojam and several kinds of sondesh. Pitha, a kind of sweet cake, bread or dim sum are specialties of winter season. Sweets like coconut-naru, til-naru, moa, and payesh are prepared during the festival of Lakshmi puja. Popular street food includes aloor chop, beguni, kati roll and phuchka.

== Darjeeling Himalayan Hill Region ==
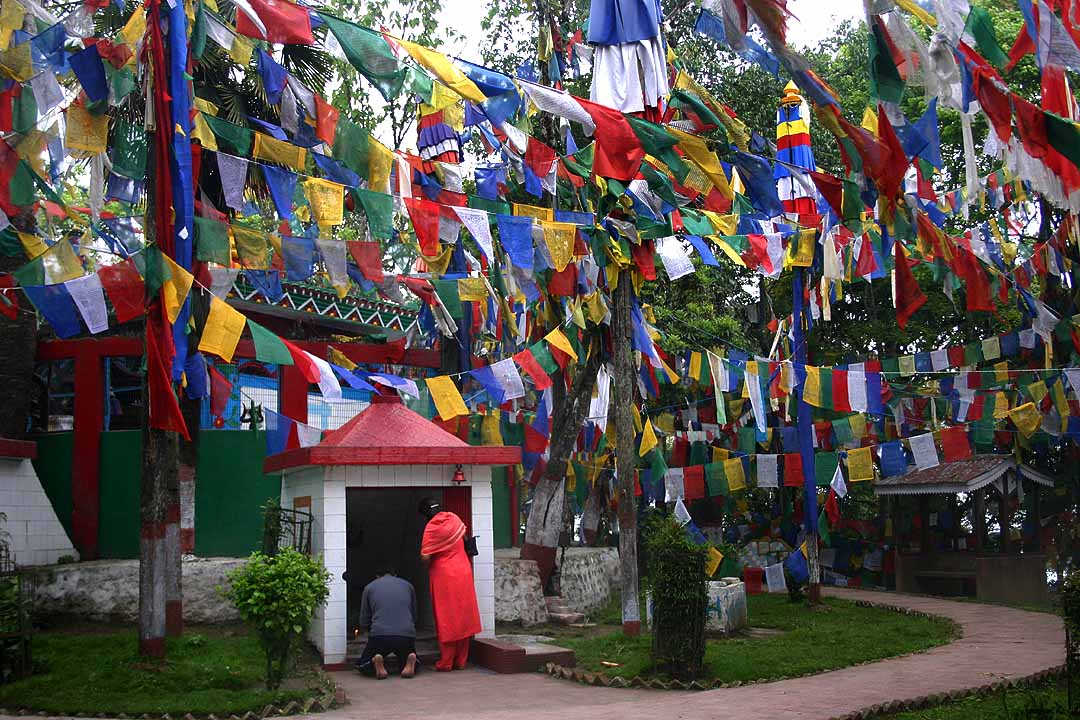
Colourful Buddhist prayer flags around Mahakal Temple at Observatory Hill, Darjeeling

Apart from the major Hindu religious festivals like Diwali, Christmas, Dussera, Holi, Ram Navami, the diverse ethnic populace of Darjeeling Himalayan hill region celebrates several local festivals. The Tibetan ethnic groups like the Lepchas, Bhutias, Gurungs, and Tamangs celebrate new year called Losar in January/February, Maghe Sankranti, Chotrul Duchen, Buddha Jayanti and Tendong Lho Rumfaat, to name a few, which provide the "regional distinctness" of Darjeeling's local culture from the rest of West Bengal.

A popular food in Darjeeling is the momo, a steamed dumpling containing either mutton, pork, beef or vegetables cooked in a doughy wrapping served with a watery vegetable soup and spicy tomato sauce/chutney. Wai-Wai is a favourite packaged snack of Darjeeling hills comprising noodles which are eaten either dry or with soup. Churpee, a kind of hard cheese made from cow or yak's milk, is another popular mini-snack that is both nutritious and a pastime. A form of noodle called thukpa, served with soup and vegetables, is popular in and around the hills of Darjeeling. Chhang and tongba are local alcoholic beverages made from millet.

== Pilgrimages ==
West Bengal attracts tourists for pilgrimages to the holy places of different religions.

Hinduism

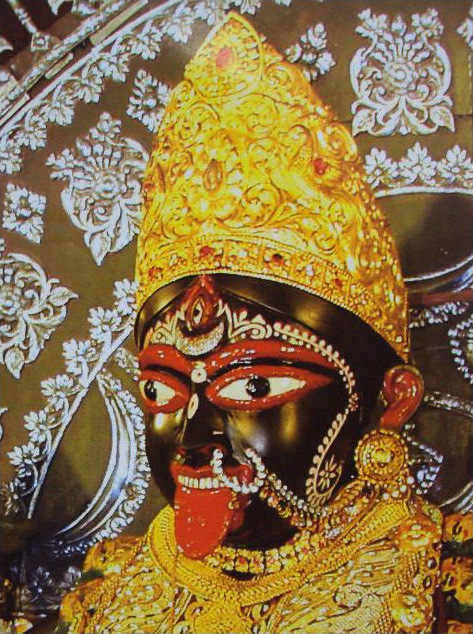
Face of the idol of Goddess Bhavatarini from the Dakshineshwar Kali Temple

People from different sections of the world come to West Bengal for holy pilgrimages as Kolkata is one of the four Adi Shakta pithas. Among the other 52 Shakta pithas, some are located in West Bengal. They are as follows:

- Bardhaman
- Gangasagar
- Bahula, on the banks of Ajay River at Ketugram, 8 km from Katwa, Burdwan, West Bengal
- Ujaani, 16 km from Guskara station under Burdwan district of West Bengal
- A temple locally known as Bhramari Devi, behind a rice mill, near Jalpesh Temple in Jalpaiguri, West Bengal
- Yoga Adya at Khirgram; under Burdwan district, West Bengal
- Kalighat Kalipeeth in Kolkata
- Kireet at Kireetkona village, 3 km from Lalbag Court Road station under Murshidabad district, West Bengal
- Kankalitala, on the banks of Kopai River 10 km north-east of Bolpur station in Birbhum district. Devi locally known as Kankaleshwari.
- Vibhash, at Tamluk, under district Purba Medinipur, West Bengal
- Tarapith

Only one Maha Shakta pitha, known as Pradyumna, existed. This temple is currently non-existent. Only ruins are found in these places. Instead, Sringeri in Karnataka is believed to be the Shakta pitha of this aspect of the Goddess.

Other than the Shakta pithas many other famous temples also exist. They are the famous Belur Math, Mayapur ISKCON Temple, Hangseshwari Temple, Tarakeshwar Temple, Thakurnagar Thakur Ari Temple, Baranagar Math and Dakshineswar Kali Temple.

Jainism

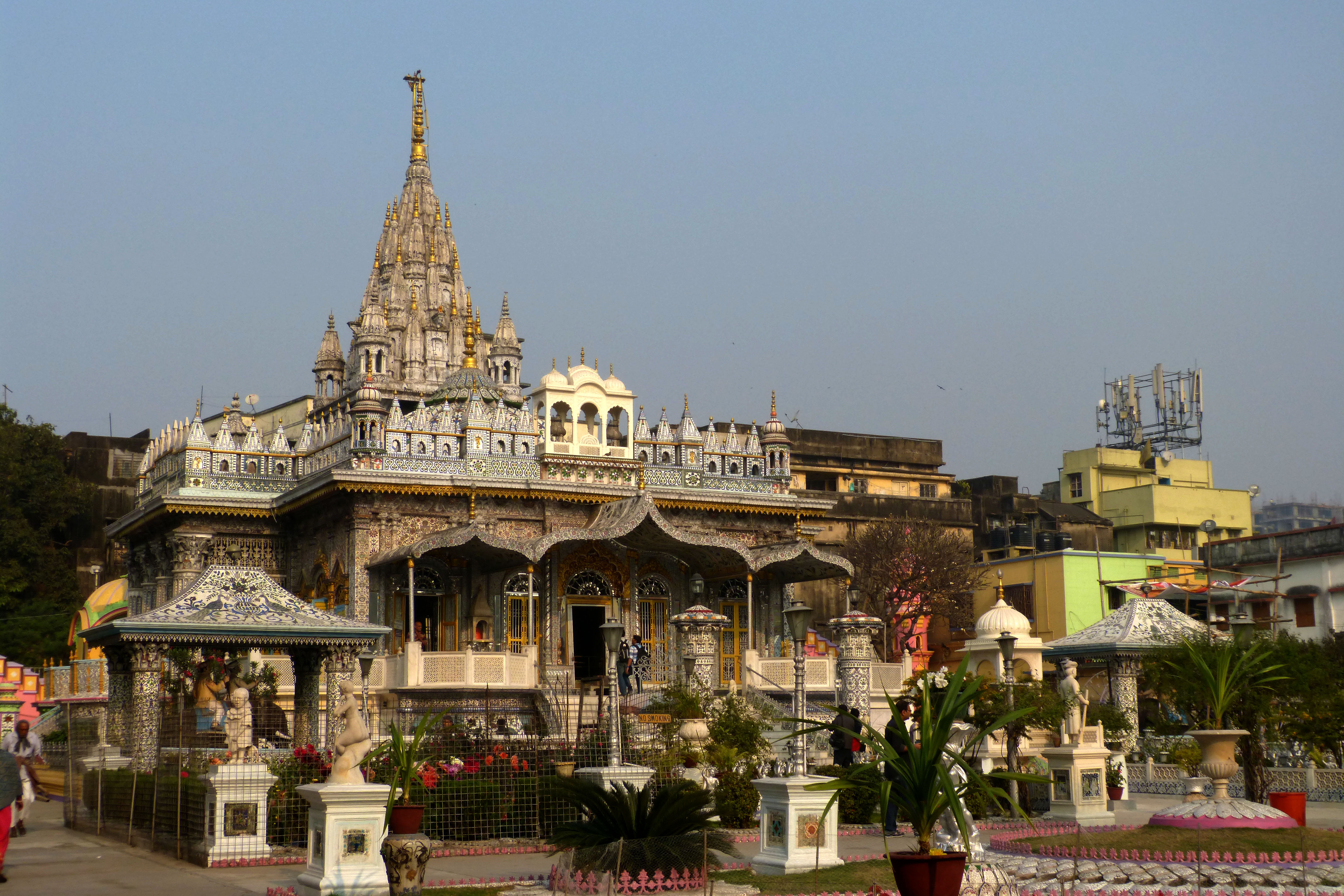
Calcutta Jain Temple

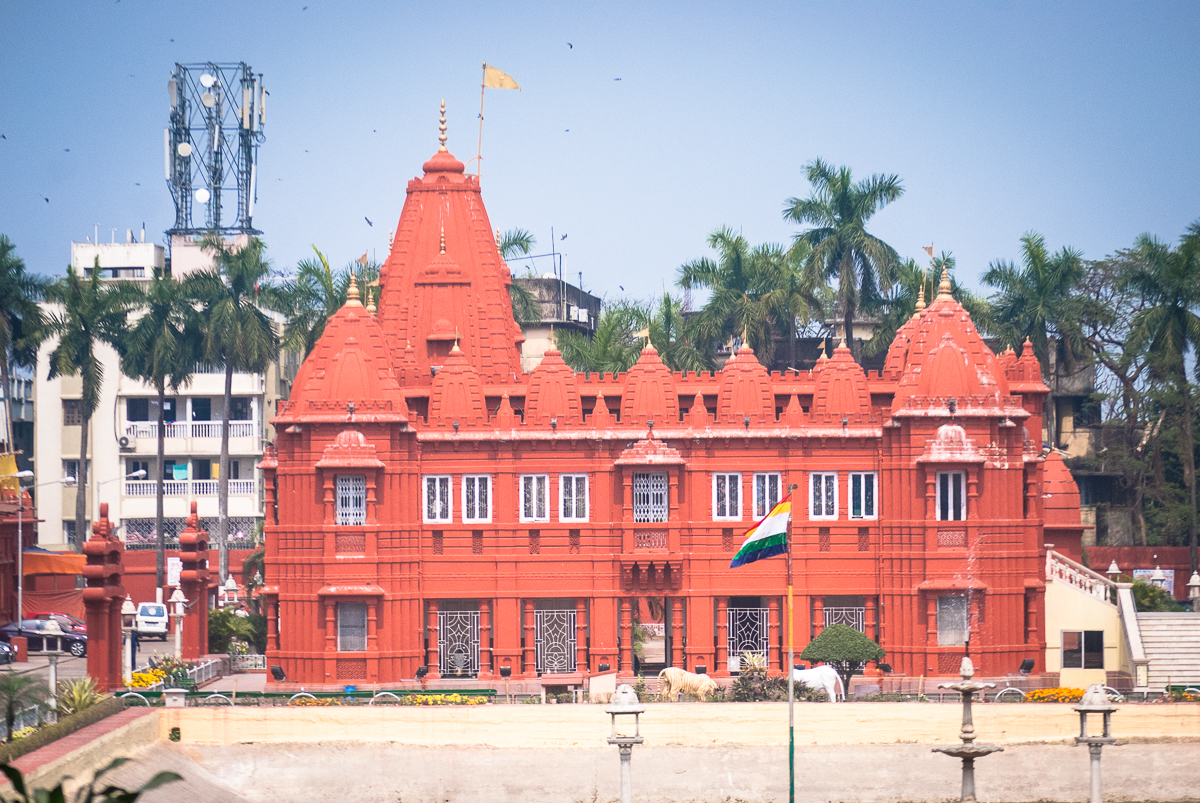
Belgachhia Parshwanatha temple

- Pakbirra Jain temple, Purulia
- Calcutta Jain Temple, Kolkata
- Shree Digambar Jain Pareswanath Temple, Belgachia
- Sat Deul
- Harmasra Jain temple

Islam

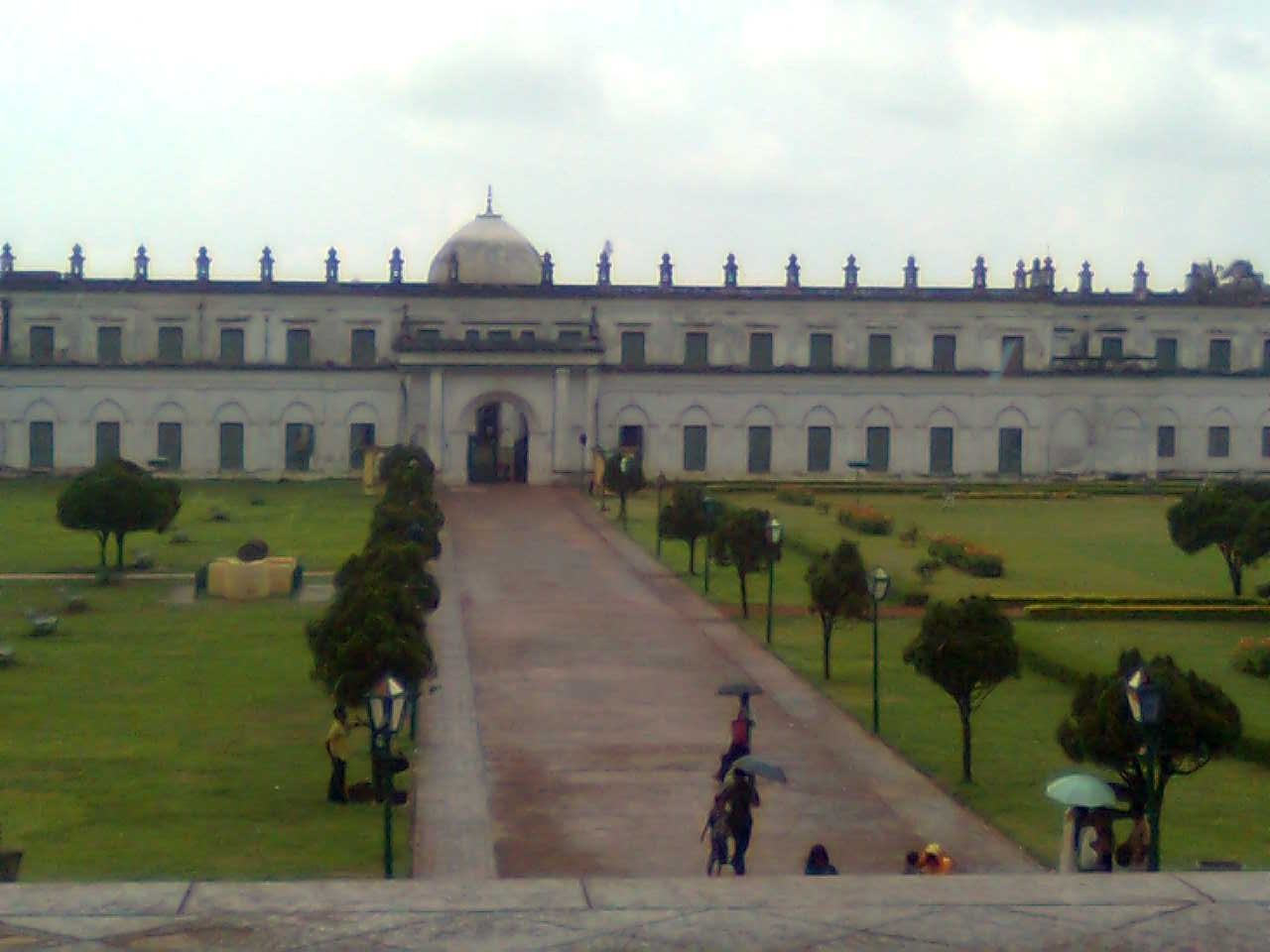
The Nizamat Imambara is the largest one in India and Bengal

There are countless mosques in West Bengal but some of them are famous like the Nizamat Imambara in Murshidabad, Katra Mosque which is also in Murshidabad, Furfura Sharif and Tipu Sultan Shahi Mosque on Chowringhee Road in Kolkata.

Sikhism

There are many Gurudwaras in West Bengal like Gurudwara Bari Sangat in Kolkata, Gurudwara Chhoti Sangat, Gurudwara Nima Serai Sri Guru Tegh Bahadur, Gurudwara Sikh Sangat and Gurudwara Liluah Belur Sikh Sangat in Liluah.

Christianity

There are also many churches in West Bengal like the Basilica of the Holy Rosary in Bandel, St. John's Church, St. James' Church (Jora Girja), St. Paul's Cathedral and Church of the Lord Jesus.

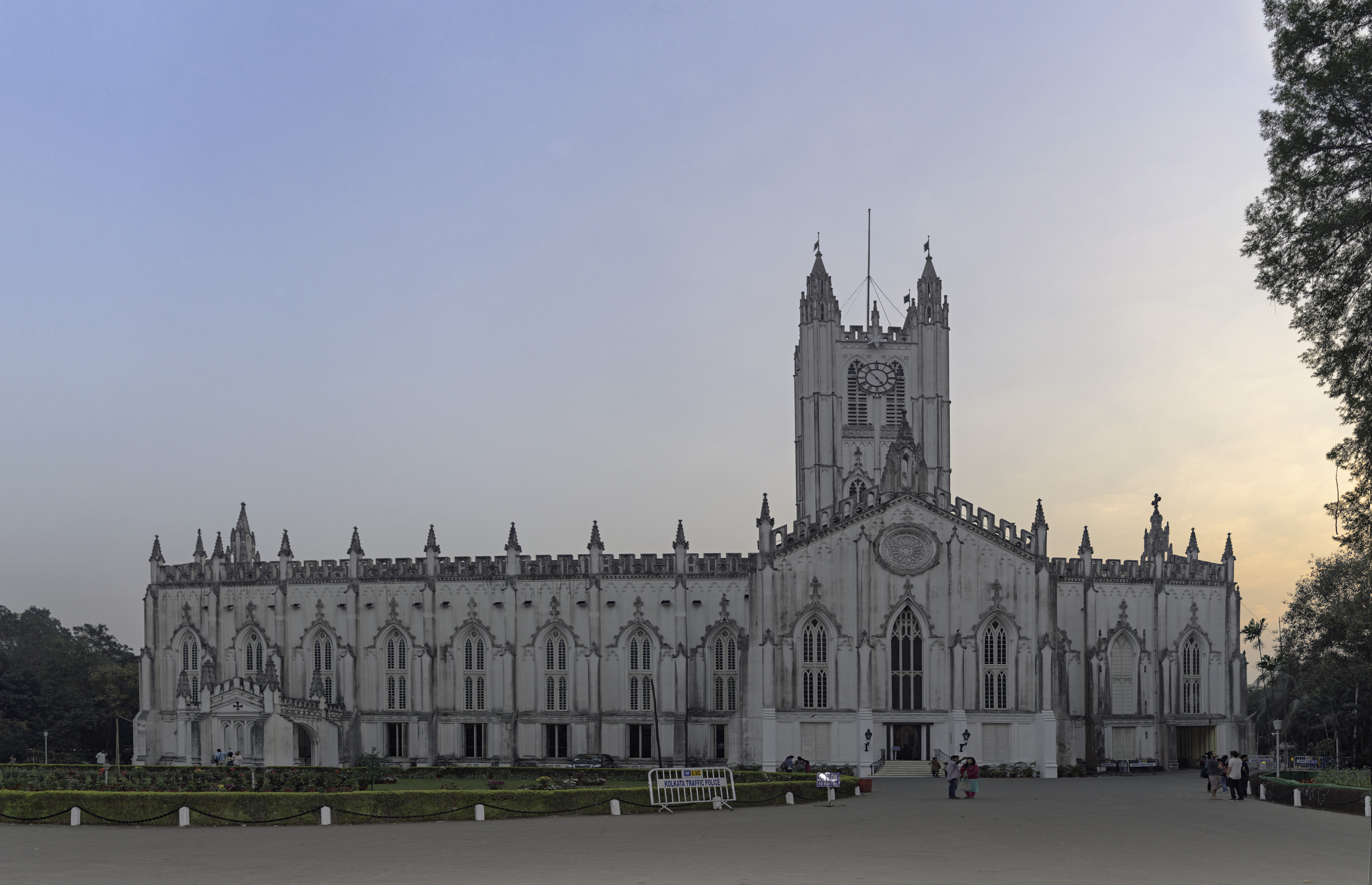
St. Paul's Cathedral in Kolkata

Buddhism

There are also many Buddhist monasteries in West Bengal, especially in the hilly regions, like the Ghoom Monastery, Bhutia Busty Monastery, Mag-Dhog Yolmowa Monastery, Tharpa Choling Monastery and Zang Dhok Palri Phodang.

== Seven wonders of West Bengal ==
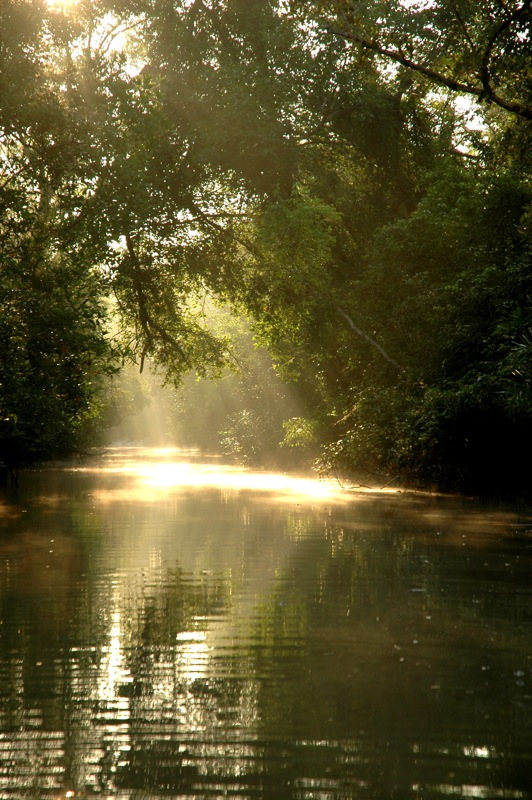
Sunderbans is the first wonder of West Bengal

NDTV along with the Ministry of Tourism, Government of India, conducted a nationwide campaign for searching the "Seven Wonders of India" in 2008–09. The campaign started with shortlisting 200 places from all of the Indian states and then inviting the public to cast their vote for their favourites. It also included seven wonders of particular states. In West Bengal a total 13 were selected of which the "Seven Wonders of West Bengal" were shortlisted. The list of the 30 selected places are as follows:

- Cooch Behar Palace
- Darjeeling Himalayan Railway ("Toy Train")
- Hazarduari Palace
- Adina Mosque
- Gaur, West Bengal
- Shantiniketan
- Bishnupur Terracotta Temples
- Acharya Jagadish Chandra Bose Indian Botanic Garden with the Great Banyan Tree
- Howrah Bridge
- B. B. D. Bagh (formerly called Dalhousie Square)
- Dakshineswar Kali Temple
- Second Hooghly Bridge
- Victoria Memorial
- Sunderbans
- St. Paul's Cathedral

The shortlisted list, compiling of the "Seven Wonders of West Bengal" as per the votings is as follows:

- Sunderbans
- Victoria Memorial
- Darjeeling Himalayan Railway ("Toy Train")
- Bishnupur Terracotta Temples
- Acharya Jagadish Chandra Bose Indian Botanic Garden with the Great Banyan Tree
- Howrah Bridge
- B. B. D. Bagh (formerly called the Dalhousie Square)

== Gallery ==
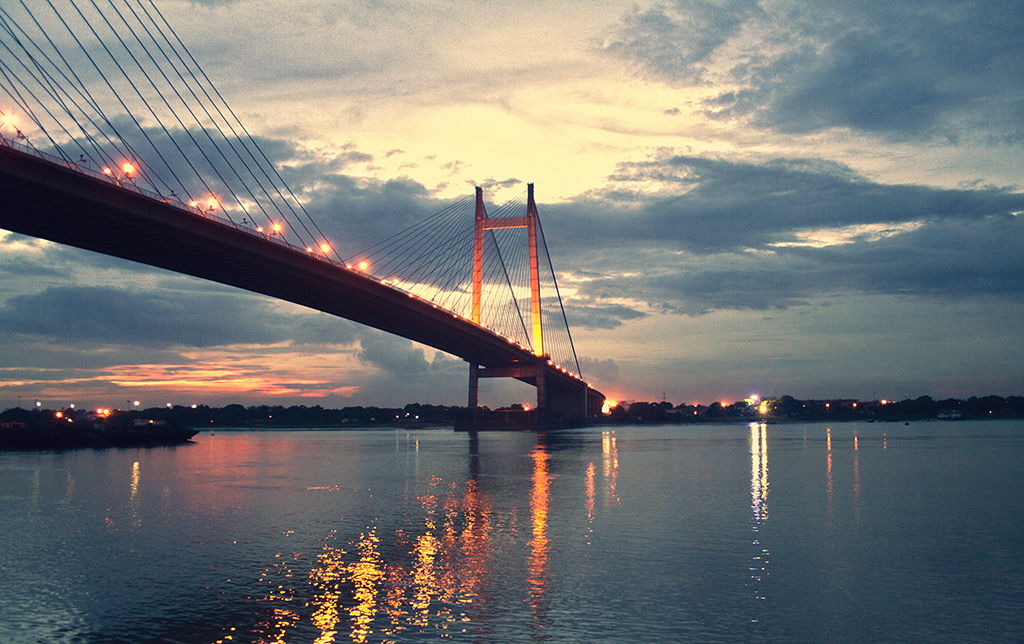
The Second Hooghly Bridge illuminated at night

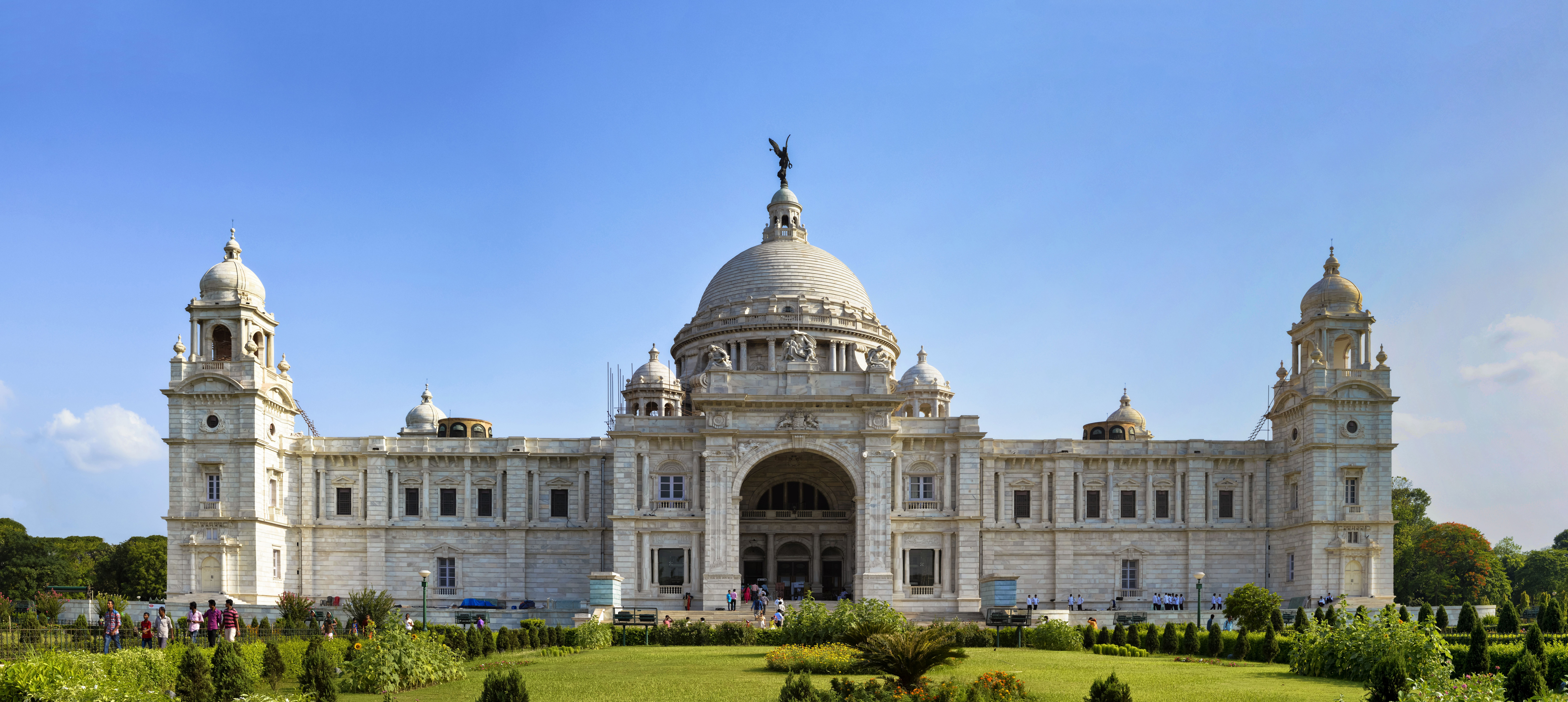
Victoria Memorial situated in Kolkata

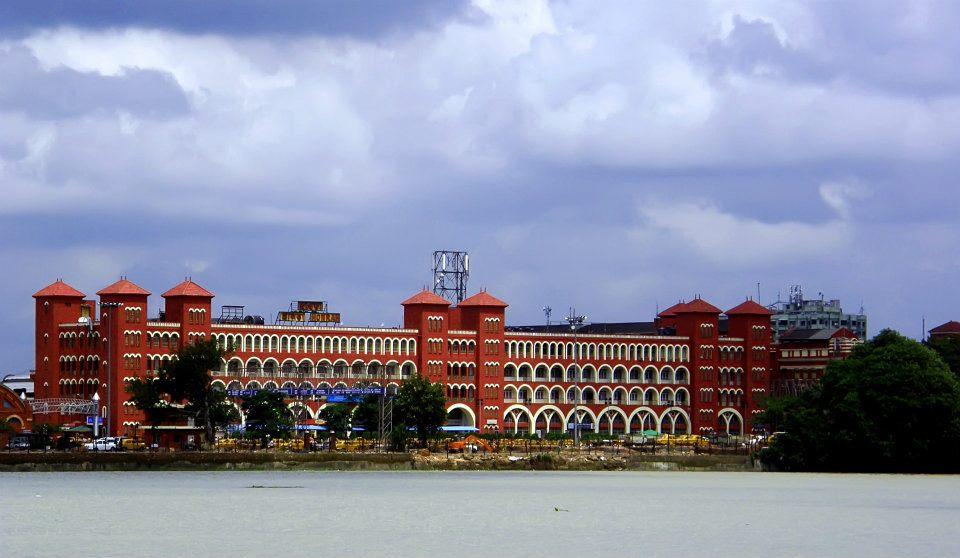
The Howrah Station is one of the five intercity train stations serving Howrah and Kolkata; the others are Sealdah Station, Shalimar Station, Santragachi railway station and Kolkata railway station in Kolkata

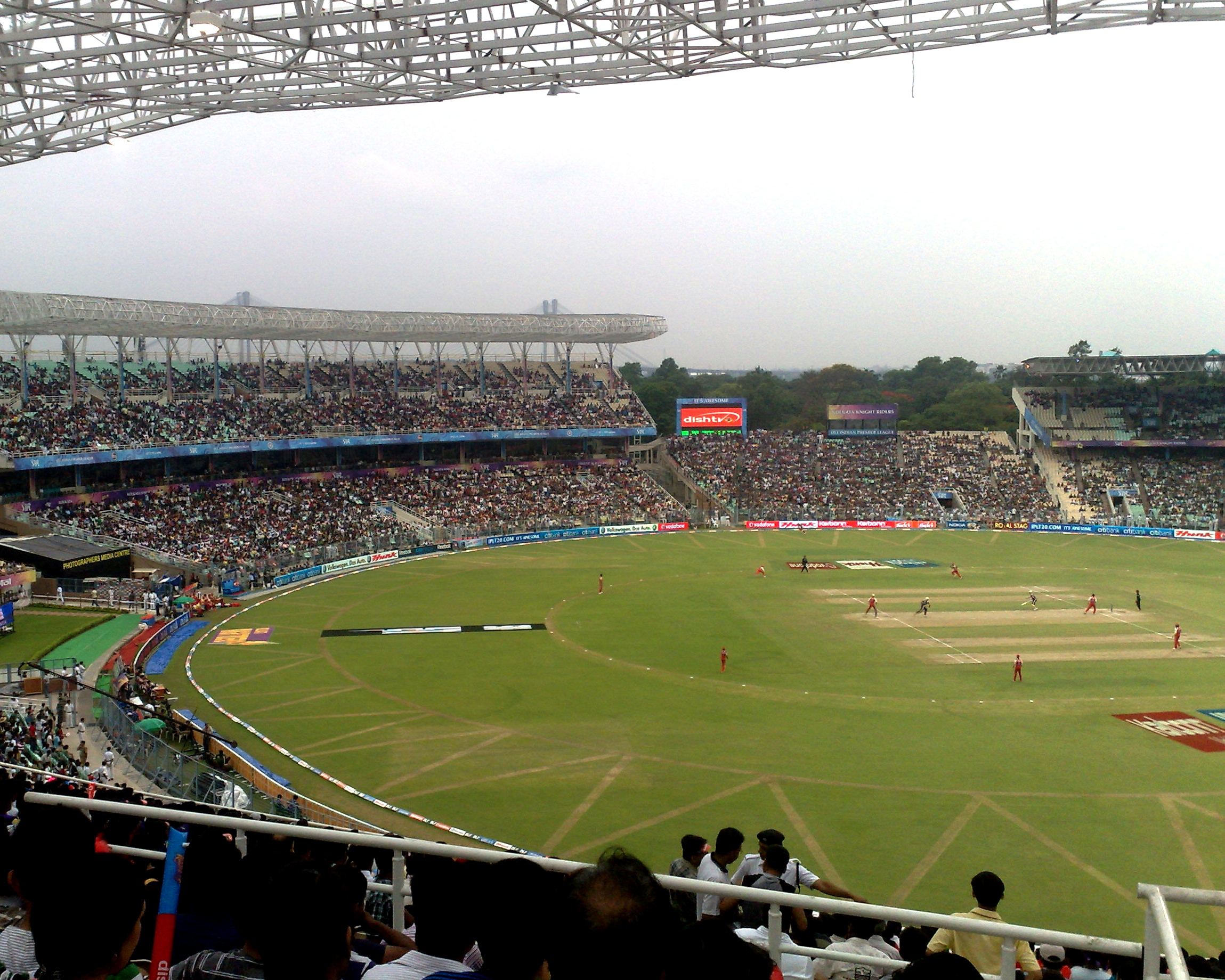
Eden Gardens is the largest cricket stadium in India and second-largest in the world by seating capacity

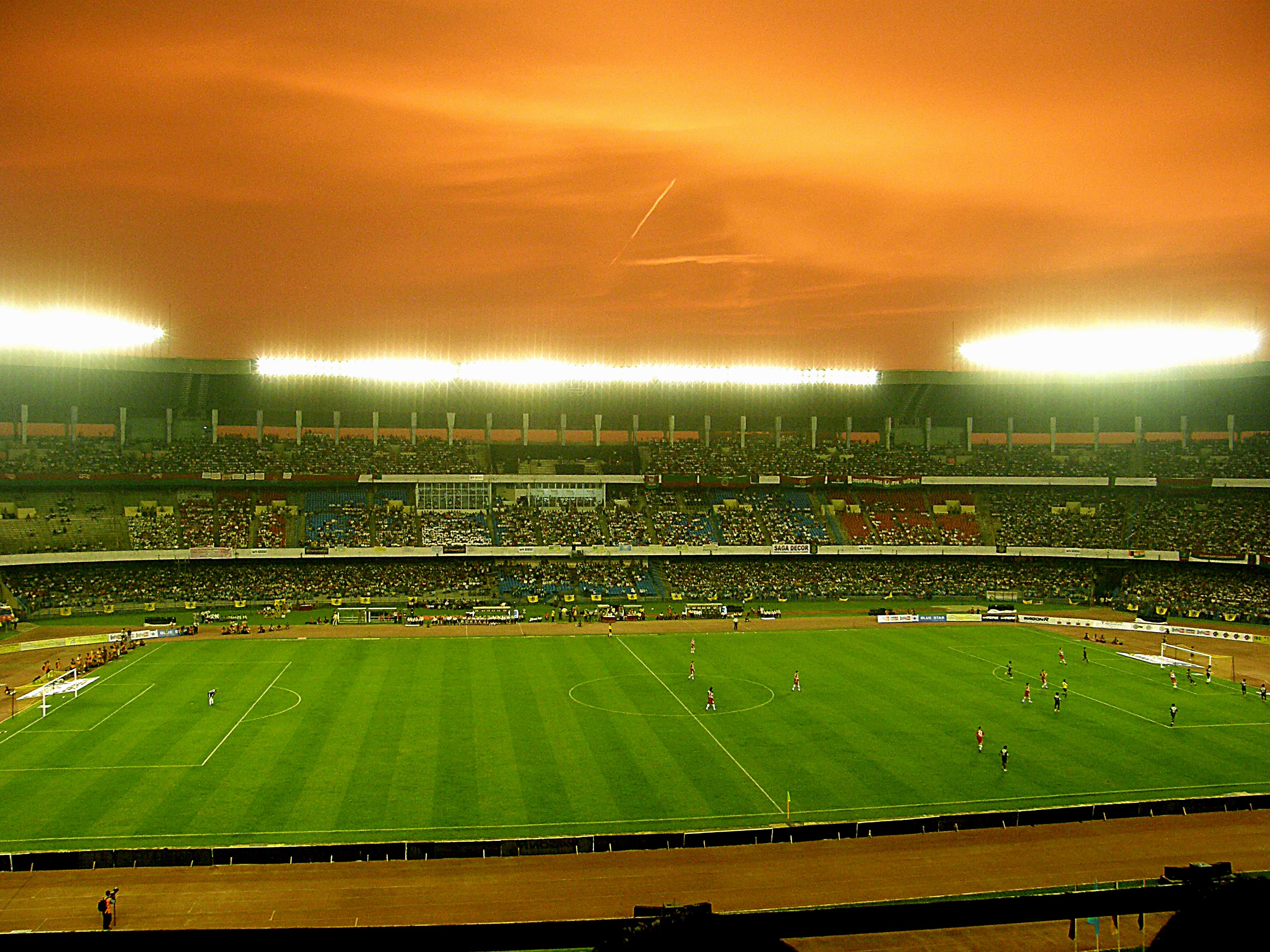
Salt Lake Stadium is the second largest non-auto racing stadium in the world and the largest in the Indian sub-continent. The stadium was built in 1984 and holds 120,000 people in a three-tier configuration.

== See also ==
- West Bengal Tourism Development Corporation
- Tourism in North East India
- West Bengal
- Tourism in India
- List of tourist attractions in Kolkata
- Tourist attractions in West Bengal
