= Department of Tourism (West Bengal) =

State government department in West Bengal, India

Department overview
- Jurisdiction: West Bengal
- Headquarters: New Secretariat Building, 1 K. S. Roy Road, Kolkata-700001
- Minister responsible: Shankar Ghosh, Cabinet Minister
- Deputy Minister responsible: Purnima Chakraborty, MoS
- Department executives: Shri Barun Kumar Ray, I.A.S., Additional Chief Secretary; Shri Soumitra Sankar Sengupta, I.A.S., Secretary
- Parent Department: Government of West Bengal
- Child Department: WBTDCL
- Website: Official Website

The Department of Tourism is a West Bengal government department. It is an interior ministry mainly responsible for the administration of the development of Tourism in West Bengal.

== List of ministers ==
- Shankar Ghosh, Cabinet Minister (since 01 June 2026)
- Purnima Chakraborty, MoS (since 01 June 2026)
- Indranil Sen, MoS I/C (2021-2026)
- Goutam Deb (2016-2021)
- Bratya Basu (2014-2016)
- Krishnendu Narayan Choudhury (2011-2014)
- Manab Mukherjee (till 2011)

== Introduction ==
The Department of Tourism, Government of West Bengal, is responsible for the development of tourism in the state of West Bengal. The Department of Tourism in West Bengal is engaged in facilitating the services for promotion of tourism.

== Facilities ==
The Department has a unit named West Bengal Tourism Development Corporation which has many tourist centers all around the state in various districts, where online booking is also available. The Department has taken a number of initiatives and also offering various packages through WBTDCL throughout the year as well as on special occasions and festivals like Durga Puja, One of the biggest festivals of the world, Christmas, Poush Mela, Basant Utsav, etc. The Department has a digital presence through its website, Mobile app, social media, radio, and TV, as well as audio-visual mediums.
