= Morgan House, Kalimpong =

British colonial mansion in Kalimpong, West Bengal, India

Morgan House
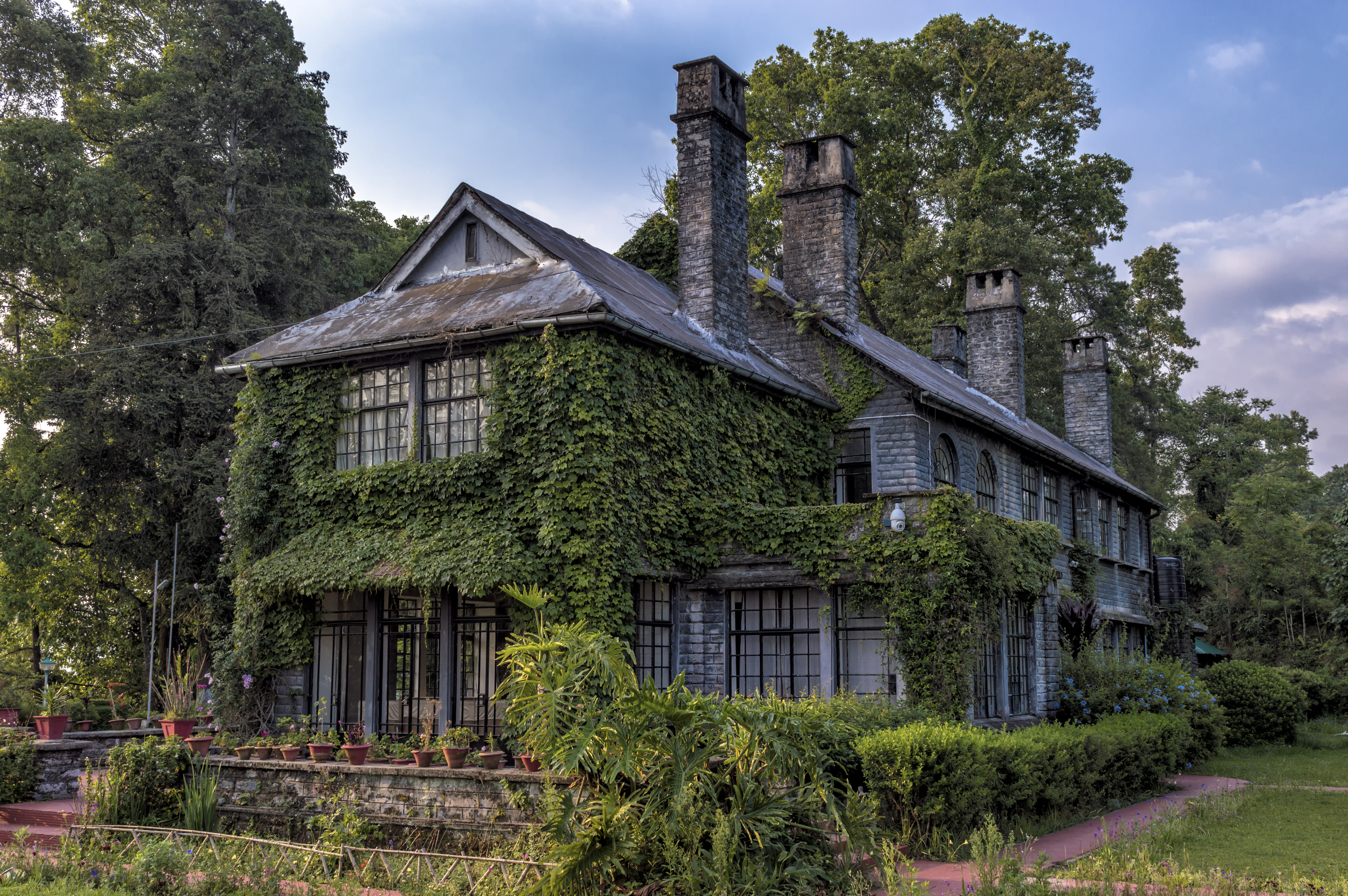
- Morgan House, Kalimpong is a colonial British mansion
- Interactive map of the Morgan House area
- Former names: Singamari Tourist Lodge, Durpin Tourist Lodge

General information
- Status: Converted to Hotel
- Type: Mansion
- Architectural style: British colonial architecture
- Location: Kalimpong, West Bengal, Chandraloke, Kalimpong, West Bengal 734301, Kalimpong, India
- Coordinates: 27.045380°N 88.460942°E
- Elevation: 4,480.47 ft (1,365.65 m)
- Current tenants: West Bengal Tourism Development Corporation
- Groundbreaking: 1930; 96 years ago

Height
- Architectural: British colonial architecture

Technical details
- Material: Stone, Wood
- Floor count: 2
- Lifts/elevators: 0
- Grounds: 16 acres

Other information
- Number of rooms: 7
- Parking: Available

Website
- https://www.wbtdcl.com/home/lodge_search?Lodge_id=OA&Lodge_destinationName=Mw

Morgan House Kalimpong or Morgan House is a mansion of British colonial architecture built by an English jute baron George Morgan in the 1930s on the hill station of Kalimpong, Kalimpong district, West Bengal. Today, the mansion is a hotel managed by West Bengal Tourism Development Corporation (WBTDC). Earlier this property was also known as Singamari Tourist Lodge or Durpin Tourist Lodge.

== Location ==
Morgan House is built on a sixteen-acre estate atop the mountain of Durpindara. It is situated three kilometers off the center of Kalimpong town and has a clear view of the Kangchenjunga mountain range. The mansion and the estate is surrounded by the Kalimpong Cantonment area and overlooks the valleys of Relli, Kapher, Deolo and Labha in various directions.

Morgan House is 75 km from Siliguri, 52 km from Darjeeling and 75 km from Gangtok by road. Nearest railway station is in New Jalpaiguri and nearest airport is in Pakyong.

== History ==
Morgan house is a British colonial mansion built in the early 1930s. The building was to commemorate the wedding of an indigo plantation owner with a jute baron George Morgan.

The property was used as a summer retreat and elaborate parties were hosted. It passed into the hands of trustees after the Morgans died without an heir. It was further handed over to the government of India post Indian independence. During 1962, after then prime minister Jawahar Lal Nehru was taken ill, plans were made to convert this house into a government rest house.

However, due to sudden demise of Jawahar Lal Nehru, this plan was abandoned. In 1965 it was handed to tourism department and in 1975 it was finally handed over to West Bengal Tourism Development Corporation. Since then it is being managed as a boutique hotel and is open to tourists.

== Popular culture ==
Indian actors and celebrities such as Kishore Kumar, Amit Kumar, Leena Chandavarkar, Nargis, Sunil Dutt, Uttam Kumar, Supriya and Om Prakash have stayed in this lodge and their testimonials can be seen framed in the lounge. Actor Utpal Dutt was also a regular visitor. American ambassador in India Chester Bowles stayed here.

== Gallery ==
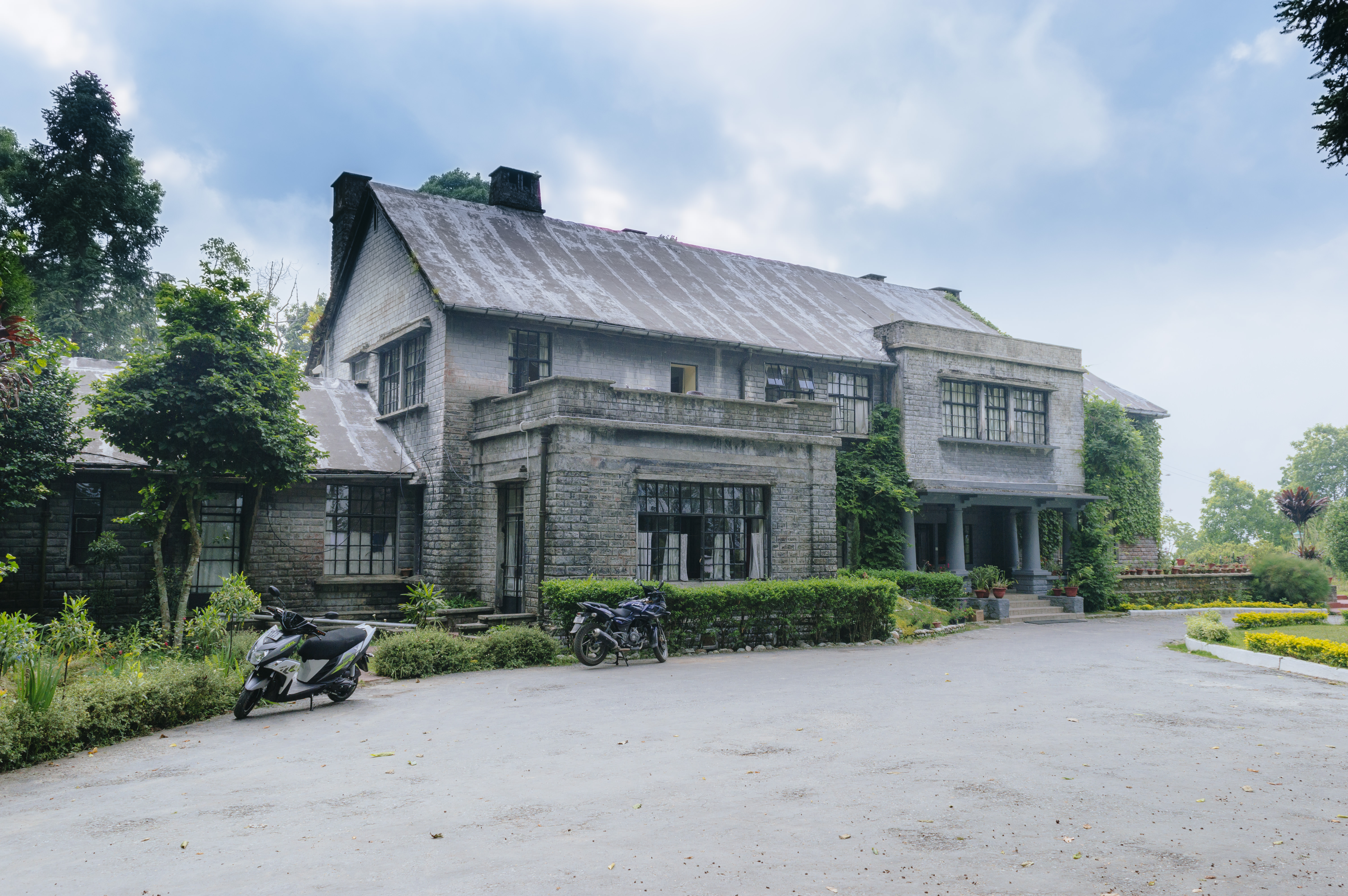
The front of the lodge from the parking area

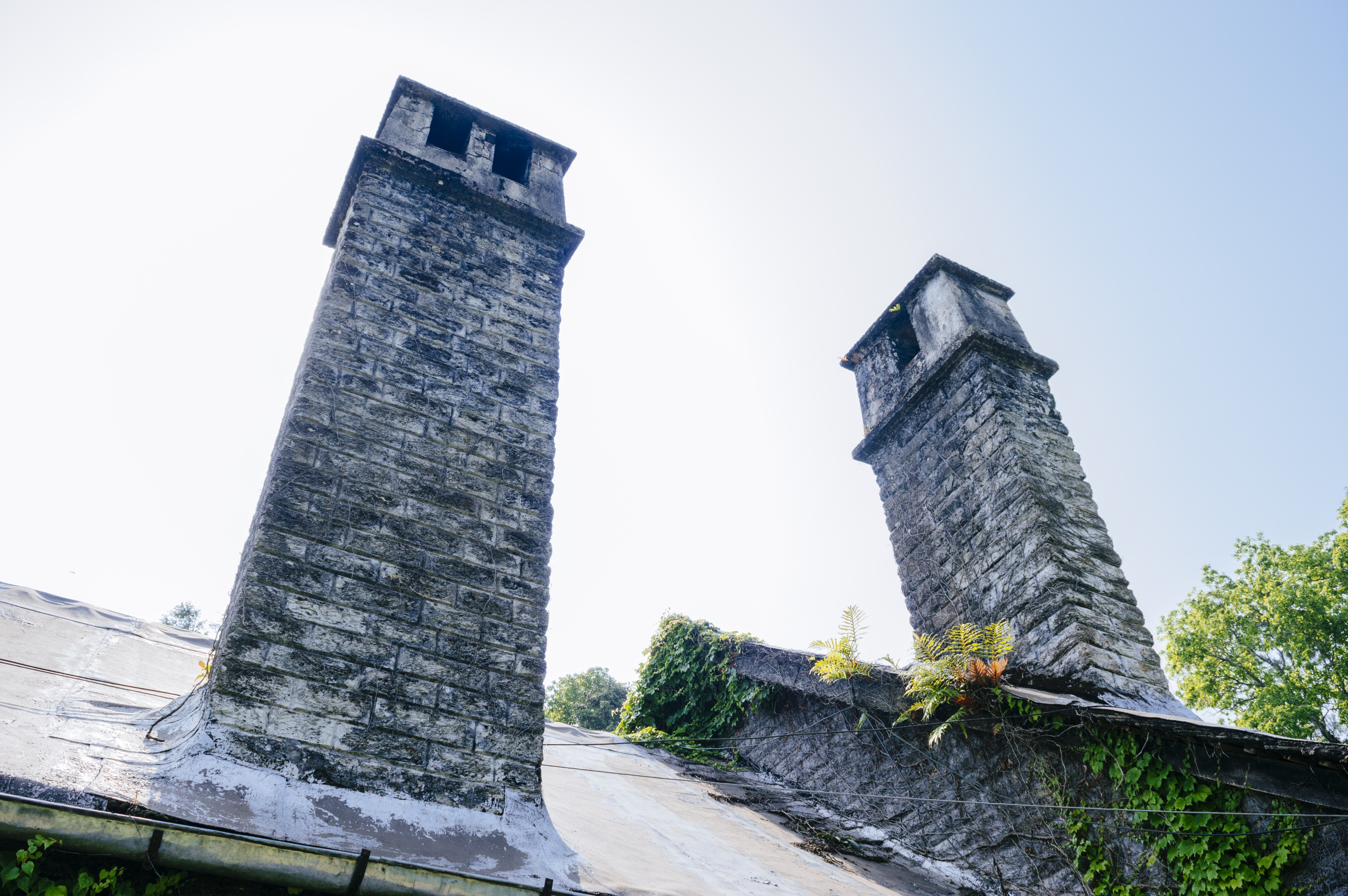
Stone chimneys

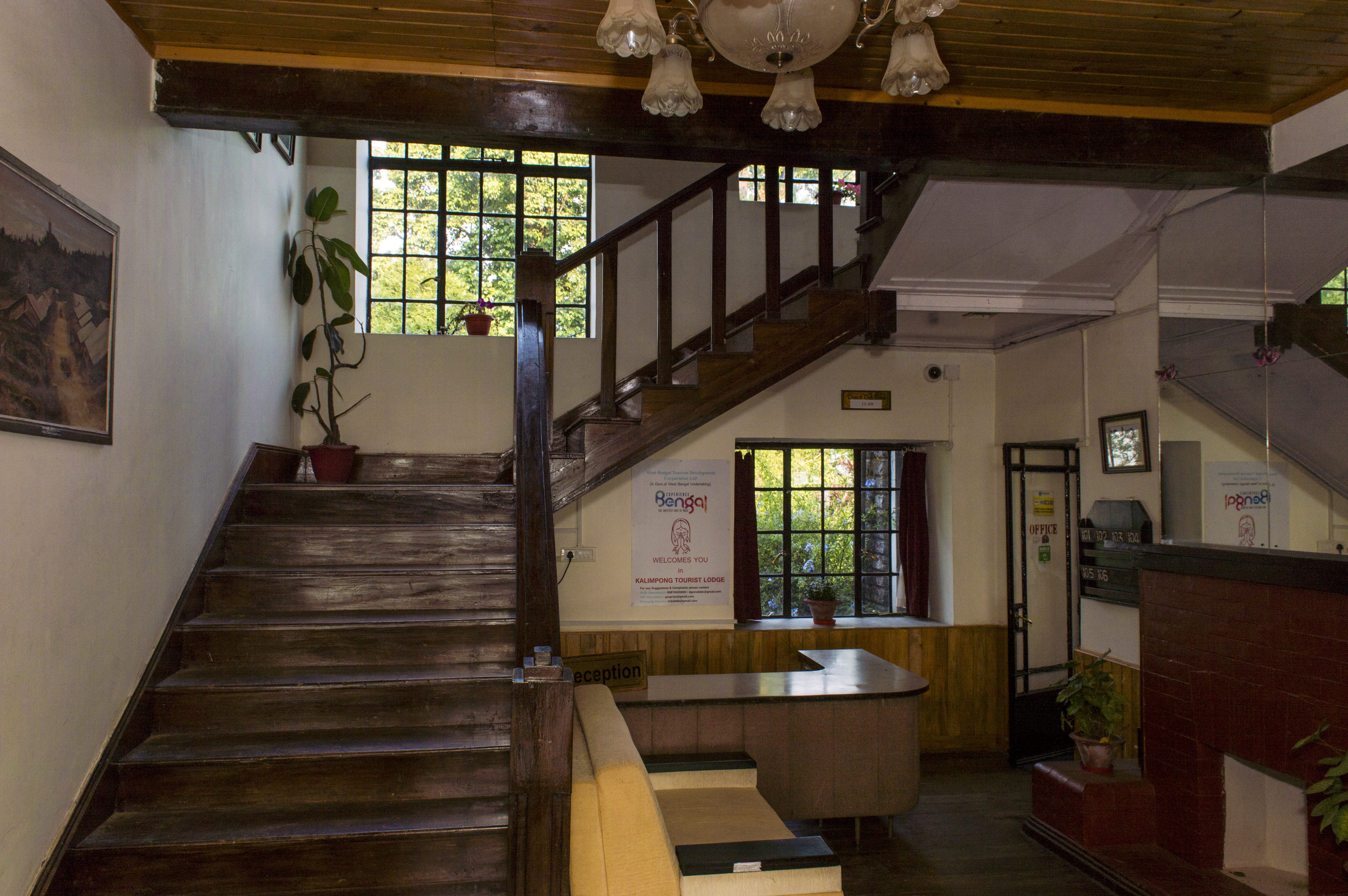
Interior wooden staircase

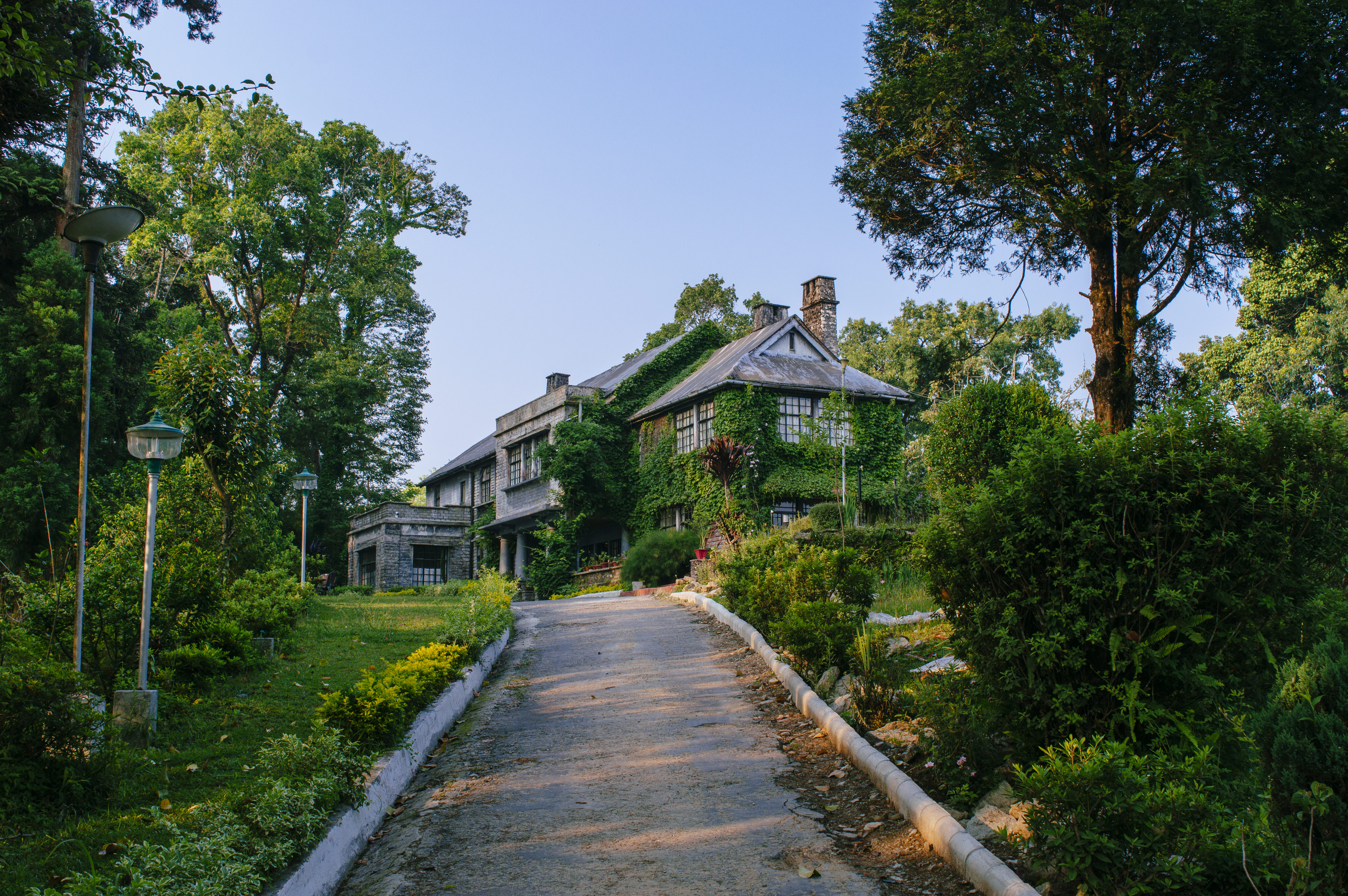
The approach road leading to Morgan House
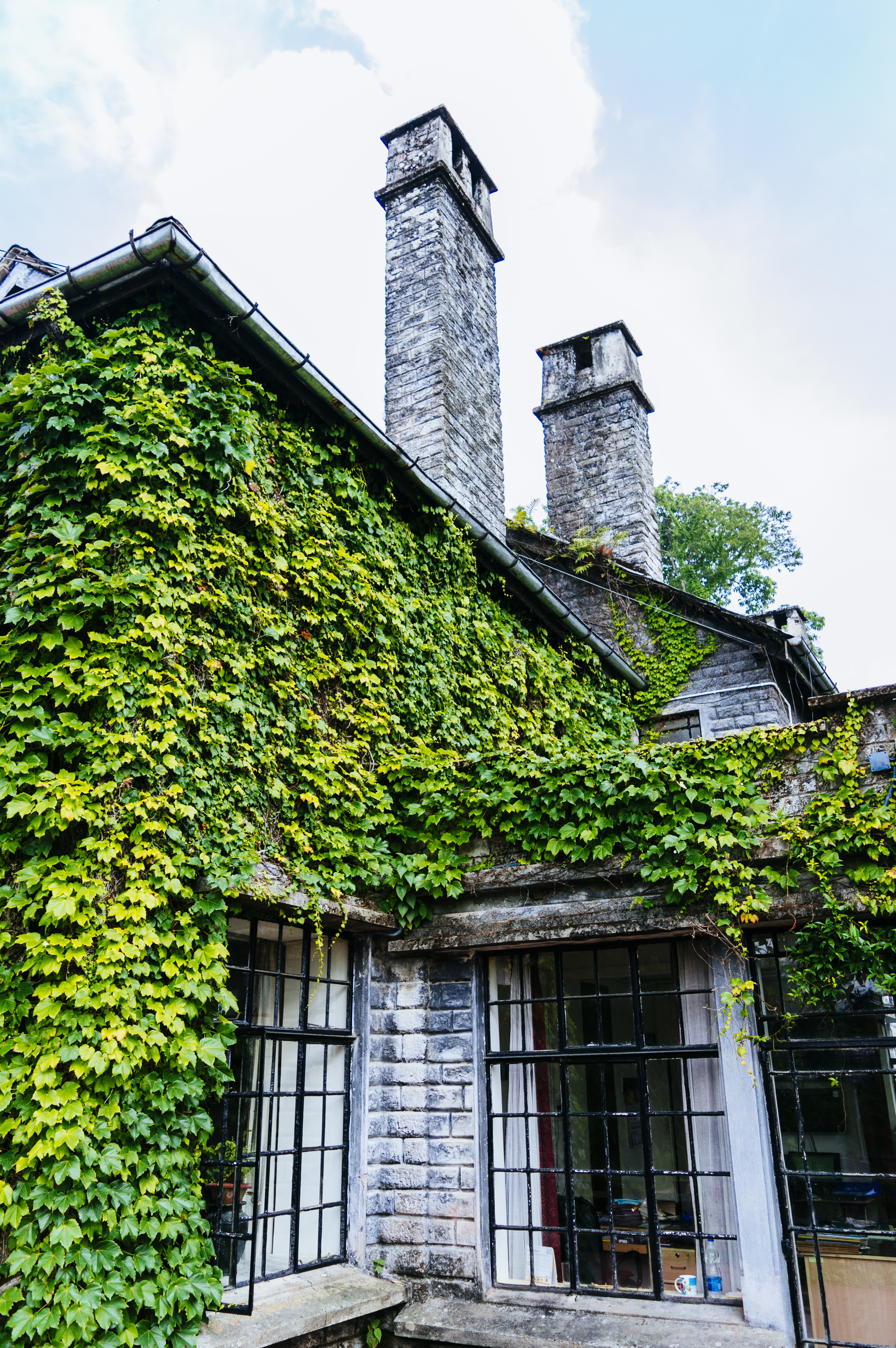
Front corner of Morgan House clad with ivy

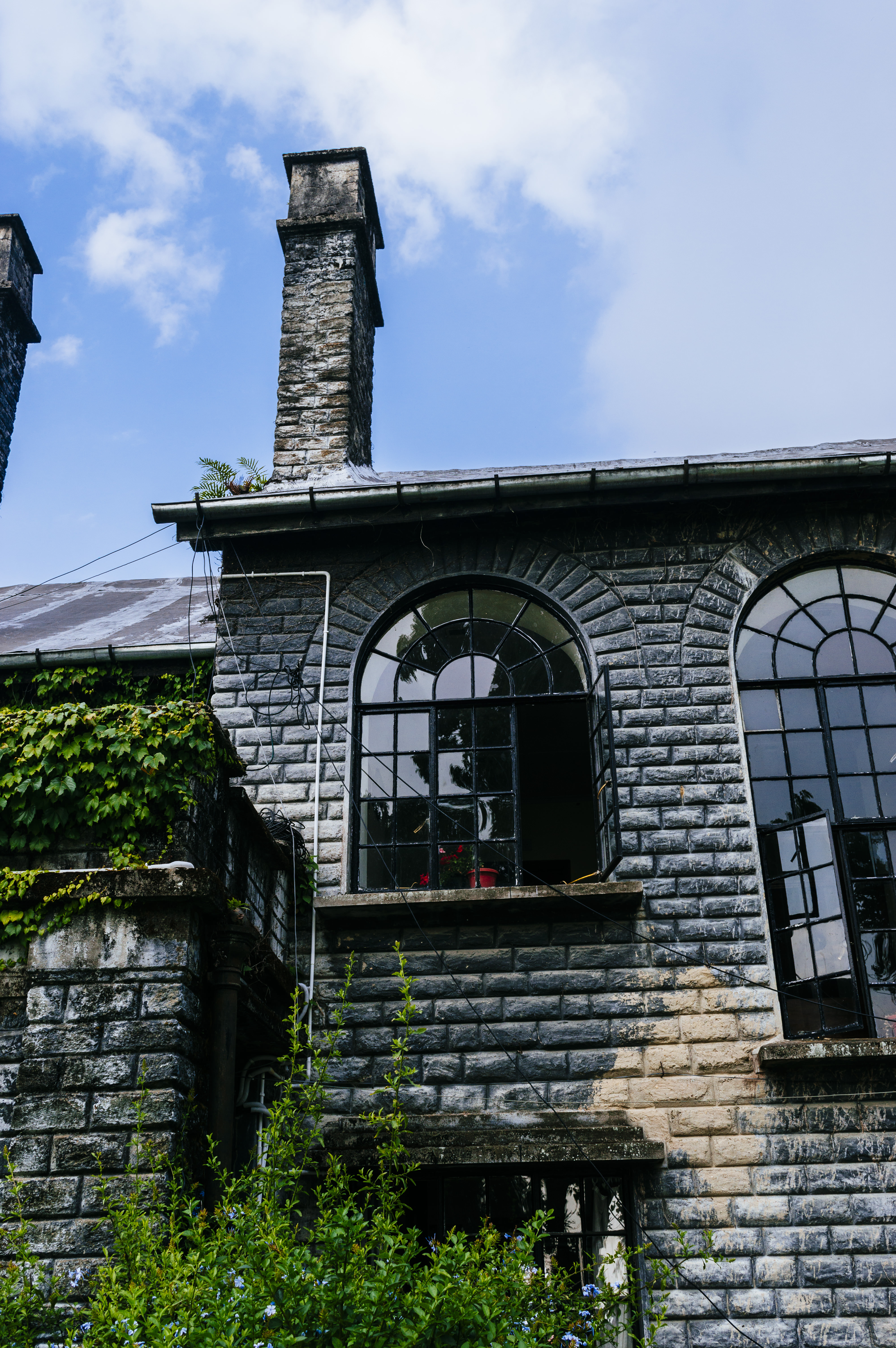
Close-up of rear glass windows of Morgan House

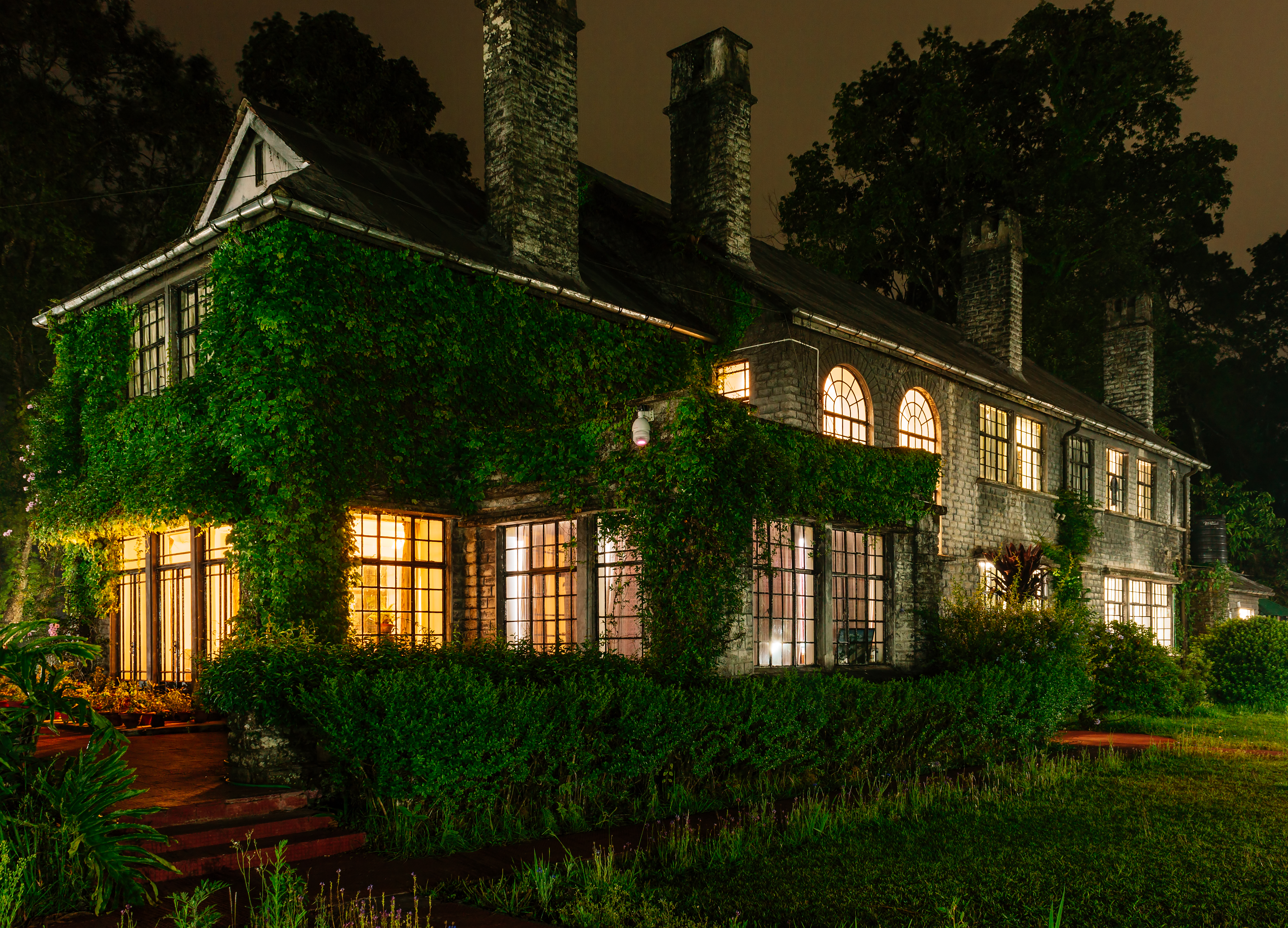
Morgan House at Night from rear lawn

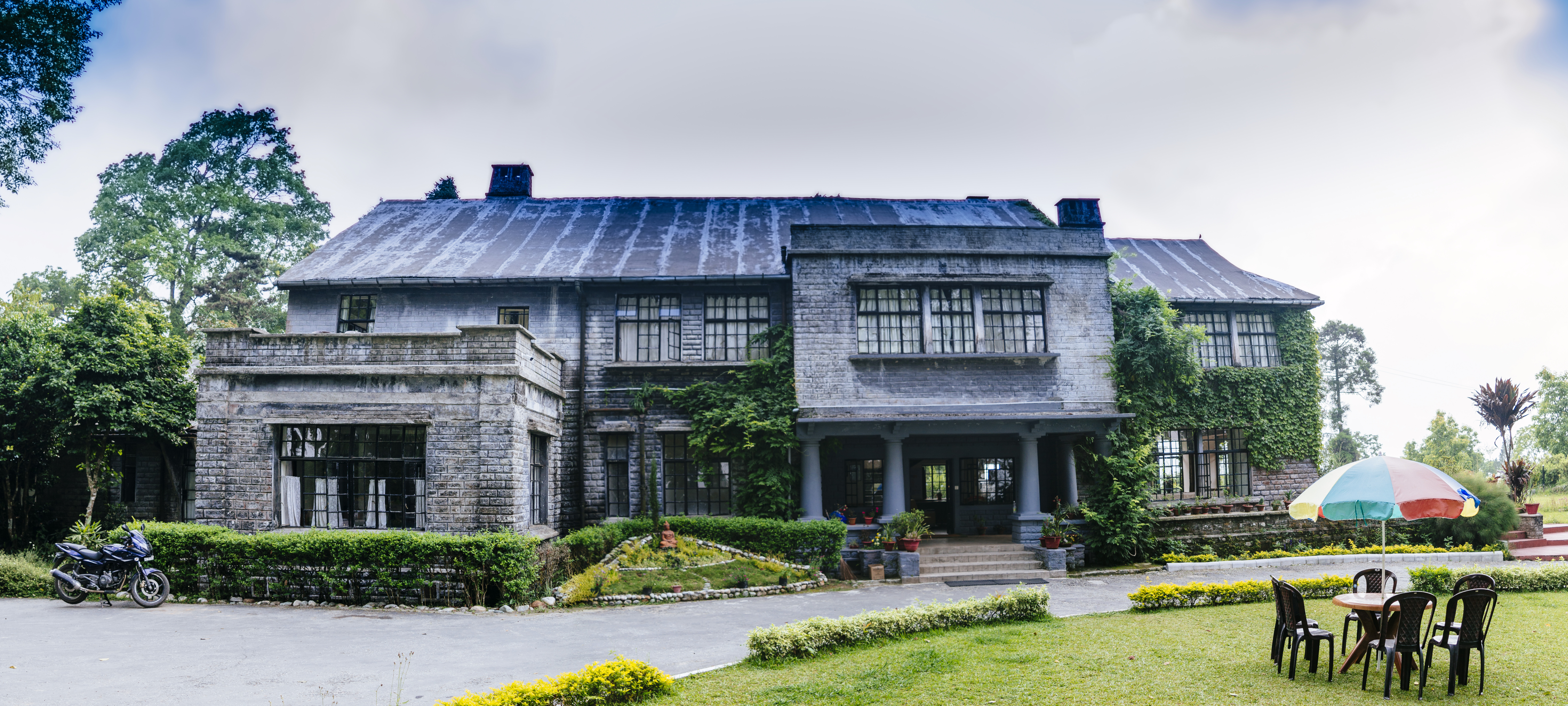
Front view of Morgan House from the lawn

== See also ==
- Kalimpong town
- Kalimpong district
- Durpin Hill
- Deolo
- West Bengal Tourism Development Corporation

== Bibliography ==
1. Gordon, Grant (15 March 2012). Cobras in the Rough. Hachette UK. ISBN 978-1-78033-512-4.
2. Mitra, Swati (2011). Wild Trail in Bengal: Travel Guide. Goodearth Publications. ISBN 978-93-80262-16-1.
3. Mehta, Vinod (2004). 100 holidays in the hills and 100 bonus hideaways. Outlook Pub. (India). ISBN 978-81-901724-6-2.
4. The India Travel Planner. Cross Section Publications (P) Limited. 2006.
5. Heritage holidays. Outlook Publishing (India). 2004.
6. Betts, Vanessa; McCulloch, Victoria (10 February 2014). Indian Himalaya Footprint Handbook: Includes Corbett National Park, Darjeeling, Leh, Sikkim. Footprint Travel Guides. ISBN 978-1-907263-88-0.
7. Planet, Lonely; Singh, Sarina; Benanav, Michael; Blasi, Abigail; Clammer, Paul; Elliott, Mark; Harding, Paul; Mahapatra, Anirban; Noble, John; Raub, Kevin (1 September 2015). Lonely Planet India. Lonely Planet. ISBN 978-1-74360-975-0.
8. Coxall, Michelle; Greenway, Paul (1 September 1996). Indian Himalaya: a Lonely Planet travel survival kit. Lonely Planet. ISBN 978-0-86442-413-6.
9. Desai, Madhavi; Desai, Miki (5 December 2016). The Bungalow in Twentieth-Century India: The Cultural Expression of Changing Ways of Life and Aspirations in the Domestic Architecture of Colonial and Post-colonial Society. Routledge. ISBN 978-1-351-89347-3.
