= West Bengal Tourism Development Corporation =

Indian state government agency

Public Sector Undertaking overview
- Formed: 29 April 1974; 52 years ago
- Type: Tourism, Ecotourism, Hotel Management, Package Touring
- Jurisdiction: West Bengal, Indiamailt
- Headquarters: Kolkata, West Bengal, India
- Motto: Experience Bengal; The Sweetest Part of India
- Public Sector Undertaking executive: Ajit Ranjan Bardhan, Chairman
- Parent department: Department of Tourism (West Bengal), Government of West Bengal
- Website: www.wbtdcl.com

The West Bengal Tourism Development Corporation Limited (WBTDCL) is a state government agency which promotes tourism in West Bengal under Department of Tourism (West Bengal), India. It was incorporated on 29 April 1974 under the Companies Act, 1956.

== Board of directors ==
The Board of Directors is appointed by the State Government and in terms of Notification no. 71-TW/IT-162/74, dt. 21.01.2014 issued by Tourism Department, Govt. of WB, the Board of Directors is reconstituted and is composed of the following.

#	Name	Post
1.	Indranil Sen	Chairman
2.	Sayantika Banerjee	Vice Chairperson
3.	Nandini Chakravorty	Director
4.	Ritendra Narayan Basu Roy Chowdhury	Managing Director
5.	Tapas Kumar Haldar	Directors
6.	Karan Paul	Directors
7.	Harshavardhan Neotia	Directors
8.	Rudra Chatterjee	Directors
9.	Mehul Mohanka	Directors

== Hotels and Lodges ==
WBTDC manages lodges and hotels in 28 locations across the state of West Bengal.

Name	Location (Coordinate)	District	Photo	About Property	Tourist Attraction
Tarabitan Tourism Property	Rampurhat (24.1699°N 87.7765°E)	Birbhum		Located at Nischintapur near Rampurhat Circuit House, 9 km from Tarapith Temple, 1.5 km from Rampurhat Railway Station	Tarapith is a major religious hub attracting pilgrims and visitors.
Mainak Tourism Property (earlier Mainak Tourist Lodge)	Siliguri (26.7310309°N 88.4126771°E)	Darjeeling		20 AC standard and 10 large double bedrooms, restaurant. Popular for hill, Dooars, and Sikkim-bound tourists.	Transit hub for North Bengal and Sikkim.
Roudra Chhaya Tourism Property (earlier Kurseong Tourist Lodge)	Kurseong (26.8856269°N 88.2776963°E)	Darjeeling	Roudra Chhaya	3 standard and 9 large AC double bedrooms, restaurant.	Scenic hill views of Eastern Himalayas.
Meghbalika Tourism Property (earlier Darjeeling Tourist Lodge)	Darjeeling (27.0490395°N 88.2664728°E)	Darjeeling	Meghbalika, Darjeeling	3 standard and 8 large AC double rooms, restaurant. Centrally located.	Near Mall, Tiger Hill sunrise point.
Morgan House Tourism Property (earlier Morgan House Tourist Lodge)	Kalimpong (27.0453642°N 88.4604499°E)	Kalimpong	Morgan House, Kalimpong	Heritage property with 1 deluxe, 1 large double, 3 standard double, 1 small double room, 8 cottages, restaurant.	Colonial lodge popular with tourists & honeymooners.
Tashiding Tourism Property	Kalimpong (27.0470023°N 88.4602119°E)	Kalimpong		Small heritage stay inside Morgan House premises.	Peaceful stay near Delo Hill.
Hill Top Tourism Property (earlier Hill Top Tourist Lodge)	Kalimpong (27.0555673°N 88.4613648°E)	Kalimpong		Standard accommodation, hillside view.	Delo Park, Science Centre.
Teesta Sundori Tourism Property (earlier Teesta Paryatak Abas)	Jalpaiguri (26.6956501°N 89.2856157°E)	Jalpaiguri		On the banks of River Teesta; good for Dooars trips.	Base for tea gardens, wildlife sanctuaries.
Bhorer Alo Tourism Property	Jalpaiguri (26.7457125°N 88.5761262°E)	Jalpaiguri		Eco-friendly complex with nature activities.	Gateway to Gorumara National Park.
Tilottama Tourism Property (earlier Tilabari Tourist Complex)	Lataguri (26.8067207°N 88.7949814°E)	Jalpaiguri		Forest-facing rooms near Gorumara.	Jungle safaris, wildlife.
Moorti Tourism Property (earlier Murti Tourist Lodge)	Murti (26.8432946°N 88.8259166°E)	Jalpaiguri		Riverside lodge with nature views.	For nature lovers, wildlife photography.
Bonolakshmi Tourism Property (earlier Malbazar Tourist Lodge)	Malbazar (26.8714971°N 88.7356818°E)	Jalpaiguri		Centrally located in Malbazar, near forests.	Chapramari, Gorumara forests.
Batabari Tourism Property	Batabari (26.8367866°N 88.801305°E)	Jalpaiguri		Jungle stay with basic amenities.	Gorumara, Jaldapara forests.
Aranya Tourism Property (earlier Jaldapara Tourist Lodge)	Jaldapara (26.5440607°N 88.7191592°E)	Alipurduar		Access to Jaldapara National Park.	Famous for one-horned rhino safaris.
Dinantey Tourism Property (earlier Raiganj Tourist Lodge)	Raiganj (25.6363291°N 88.1188846°E)	Uttar Dinajpur		Accommodation in Raiganj.	Close to Kulik Bird Sanctuary.
Amarapali Tourism Property (earlier Malda Tourist Lodge)	Malda (25.0030015°N 88.1361868°E)	Malda	Amarapali, Malda	Tourist lodge with restaurant, modern rooms.	Base for Gaur and Pandua ruins.
Motijheel Tourism Property	Murshidabad (24.1581348°N 88.2787400°E)	Murshidabad	Motijheel, Murshidabad	Near Motijheel Palace and lake.	Heritage sites including Hazarduari Palace.
Bohor Tourism Property (earlier Baharampur Tourist Lodge)	Baharampur (24.0992486°N 88.2499704°E)	Murshidabad		Centrally located lodge, modern amenities.	Tours of Nawabi Murshidabad.
Shantobitan Tourism Property (earlier Shantiniketan Tourist Lodge)	Shantiniketan (23.6702732°N 87.6913031°E)	Birbhum		Modern lodging near university.	Visva-Bharati University campus.
Rangabitan Tourism Property	Shantiniketan (23.6832807°N 87.6499236°E)	Birbhum		Close to cultural centres.	Tagore’s Ashram, seasonal fairs.
Muktodhara Tourism Property (earlier Maithon Tourist Lodge)	Maithon (23.79502°N 86.8208477°E)	Paschim Bardhaman		Lake-front lodge.	Boating, Maithon Dam sightseeing.
Bishnupur Tourism Property	Bishnupur (23.0663894°N 87.3225077°E)	Bankura		Traditional-style accommodation.	Terracotta temples of Bishnupur.
Jhargram Rajbari Tourism Property	Jhargram (22.4319919°N 86.9970642°E)	Jhargram		Heritage palace stay.	Forests and local tribal culture.
Roopmanjari Tourism Property (earlier Rupnarayan Tourist Lodge)	Gadiara (22.2212673°N 88.0490443°E)	Howrah		Confluence riverside lodge.	Scenic sunsets, riverside tourism.
Mrittika Tourism Property (earlier Rani Shiromoni Paryatak Abas)	Midnapore (22.427°N 87.3076°E)	Paschim Medinipur		In Midnapore town.	For exploring western Midnapore, local forests.
Dighali Tourism Property (earlier Digha Tourist Lodge)	Digha (21.6259207°N 87.5262903°E)	Purba Medinipur		Seaside lodge, modern facilities.	Digha beach, marine aquarium.
Mangaldhara Tourism Property (earlier Malancha Tourist Lodge)	Barrackpore (22.7550148°N 88.3605093°E)	North 24 Parganas	Mangaldhara, Barrackpore	River-facing property.	Barrackpore cantonment area.
Sagorika Tourism Property	Diamond Harbour (22.1815833°N 88.1921465°E)	South 24 Parganas		Rooms overlooking Hooghly river.	On the banks of the Hooghly.
Balutot Tourism Property (earlier Bakkhali Tourist Lodge)	Bakkhali (21.5610219°N 88.2680333°E)	South 24 Parganas		Beach-side accommodation.	To Henry’s Island, Jambu Dwip.
Matla Tourism Property (earlier Sajnekhali Tourist Lodge)	Sajnekhali (22.1237762°N 88.8313005°E)	South 24 Parganas	Matla, Sunderbans	Inside Sunderbans Tiger Reserve.	Mangrove forests, tiger safaris.

== See also ==
- Tourism in West Bengal
- Tourist attractions in West Bengal
