= St. James' Church, Kolkata =

Coordinates: 22.5550°N 88.3629°E

St. James' Church (Jora Girja), Kolkata
- Parish Church of St. James the great
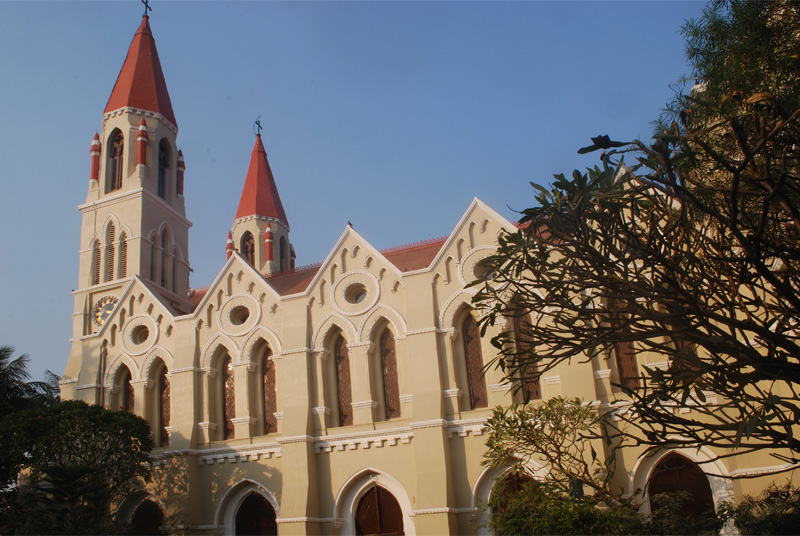
- St. James' Church (Jora Girja), Kolkata
- St. James' Church (Jora Girja), Kolkata
- Location: Entally, Kolkata
- Country: India
- Denomination: Anglicanism
- Website: www.st-jameschurch.in

Architecture
- Functional status: Active
- Architect: Walter B Granville
- Architectural type: English Gothic
- Style: Gothic
- Years built: 25 July 1864; 161 years ago
- Groundbreaking: 7 June 1862

Administration
- Diocese: Diocese of Calcutta

Clergy
- Vicar: Revd. Vishwa Vijay Gain

St. James' Church in Entally, Kolkata (Calcutta), India, is one of Kolkata's most elegant churches. Built in 1862, the twin spires of the St. James' Church dominates Kolkata's skyline. It is popularly known as Jora Girja (Bengali: জোড়া গির্জা), literally twin church, for its twin spires.

== History ==
The present church was built to replace an older one of the same name which was situated in Nebutolla Lane, near Amherst Street. This earlier church, built very much after the style and plan of St. Thomas’ Church, Free School Street, was consecrated by Bishop Reginald Heber on 12 November 1829. It appears to have fallen into a state of disrepair, due chiefly to white ants having eaten into the beams, and was declared unsafe for divine worship. An attempt was made to repair the building, but while the work was in progress, the roof fell in during the early hours of the morning of 23 August 1859, leaving the church in ruins. It was decided to abandon any further attempts to repair the Church as it was found to be very much out of the way, and in many ways inconvenient for those attending it. The church authorities, therefore, resolved to build a new church in a more convenient locality and, in conjunction with it, a school for the children of the neighbourhood. Prominent vicars of this church in the past include the late Fr Basil Manuel and the Rt Revd Dr John Perumbalath, currently Bishop of Liverpool in the Church of England.

== Architecture ==
The project for building the new church and school had the full support and backing of Archdeacon Pratt, a keen educationist, who, with his influence, was able to acquire the garden house of Mr. Coates together with its spacious grounds for the purpose. At the same time, a smaller house on the grounds was also acquired for the residence of the Chaplain. This property was situated opposite the Female European Orphan Asylum, across the road, which had been founded during July 1815 by Mrs. Thompson, the wife of the Rev. T Thompson.

The foundation stone of the new Church was laid on 7 June 1862, by the Honorable John Peter Grant, acting Lieutenant-Governor of Bengal, at the south-east corner of the foundations. A marble tablet placed on the eastern wall of the south transept reads –

The first stone of this Church dedicated to
St. James, was laid June 7th, 1862.
Consecrated by Bishop Cotton 25th July, 1864.
The Revd. Dr. Jarbo, Chaplain.

== Address ==
167, Acharya Jagadish Chandra Bose Road, Kolkata (formerly Calcutta) - 700 014. West Bengal. India.
