= Mag-Dhog Yolmowa Monastery =

Gompa (Buddhist monastery) in India

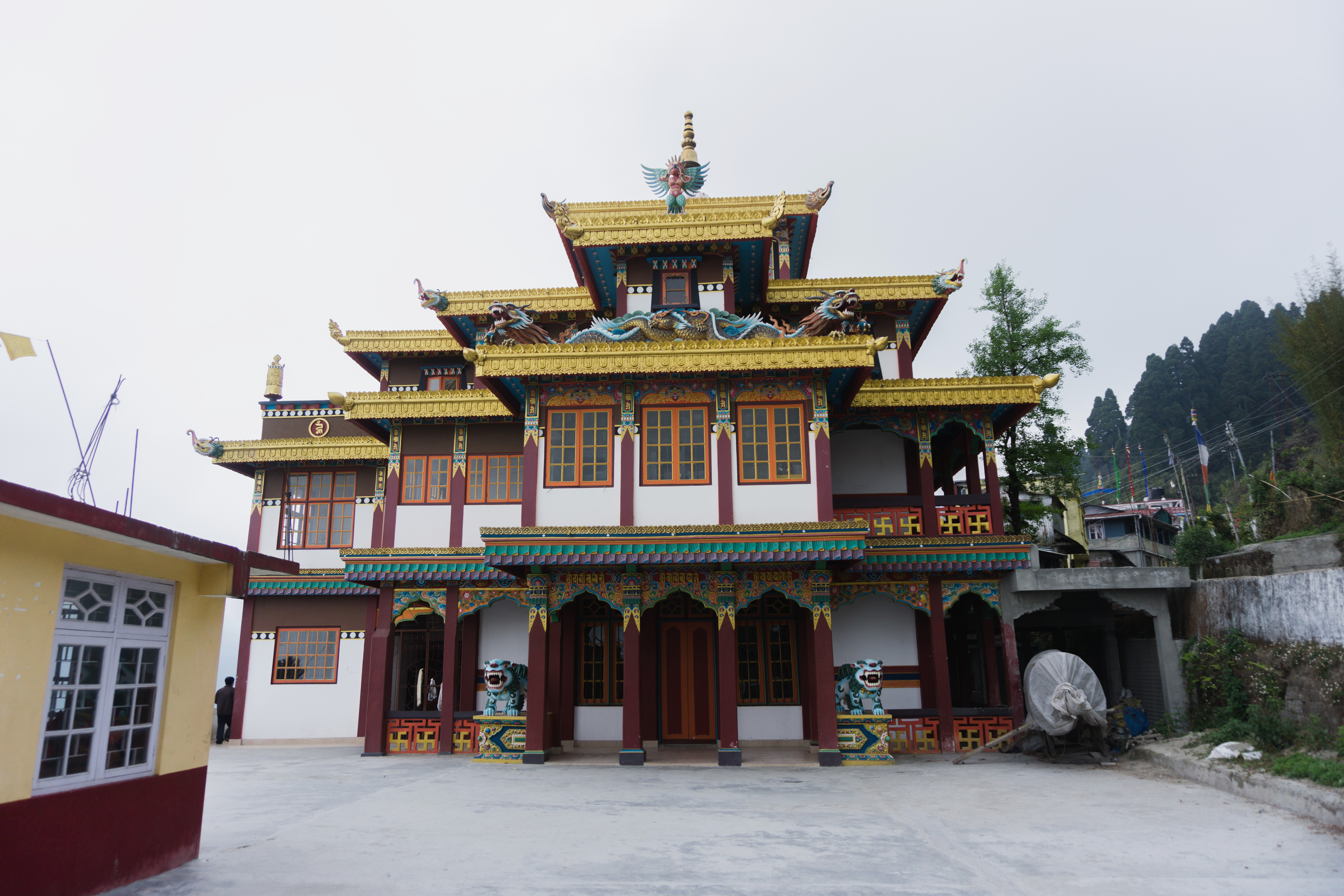
- Mag-Dhog Yolmowa Monastery

- Location within Darjeeling region

Religion
- Affiliation: Tibetan Buddhism
- Sect: Kagyu

Location
- Location: Darjeeling, India
- Country: India
- Interactive map of Mag-Dhog Yolmowa Monastery

Architecture
- Established: 1914; 112 years ago

Mag-Dhog Yolmowa Monastery is a gompa (Buddhist monastery) in the town of Darjeeling in the Indian state of West Bengal. The monastery is also known as "Aloobari" monastery after the locality it is located in. The monastery was built under the supervision of Sri Sangay Lama, a highly revered religious head of the Yolmo people - a small ethnic group from the north-east of Nepal who later settled in Darjeeling. The construction of the monastery started in 1914, the year World War I started. The name Mag-Dhog means warding off the war and the monastery was dedicated for world peace.

The monastery contains several images of Gautama Buddha and Padmasambhava and varied paintings on the wall which are said to be done with grass and herbs. The monastery also preserves several ancient Buddhist manuscripts.
