= Gariahat Road =

- Road in Kolkata (Calcutta)
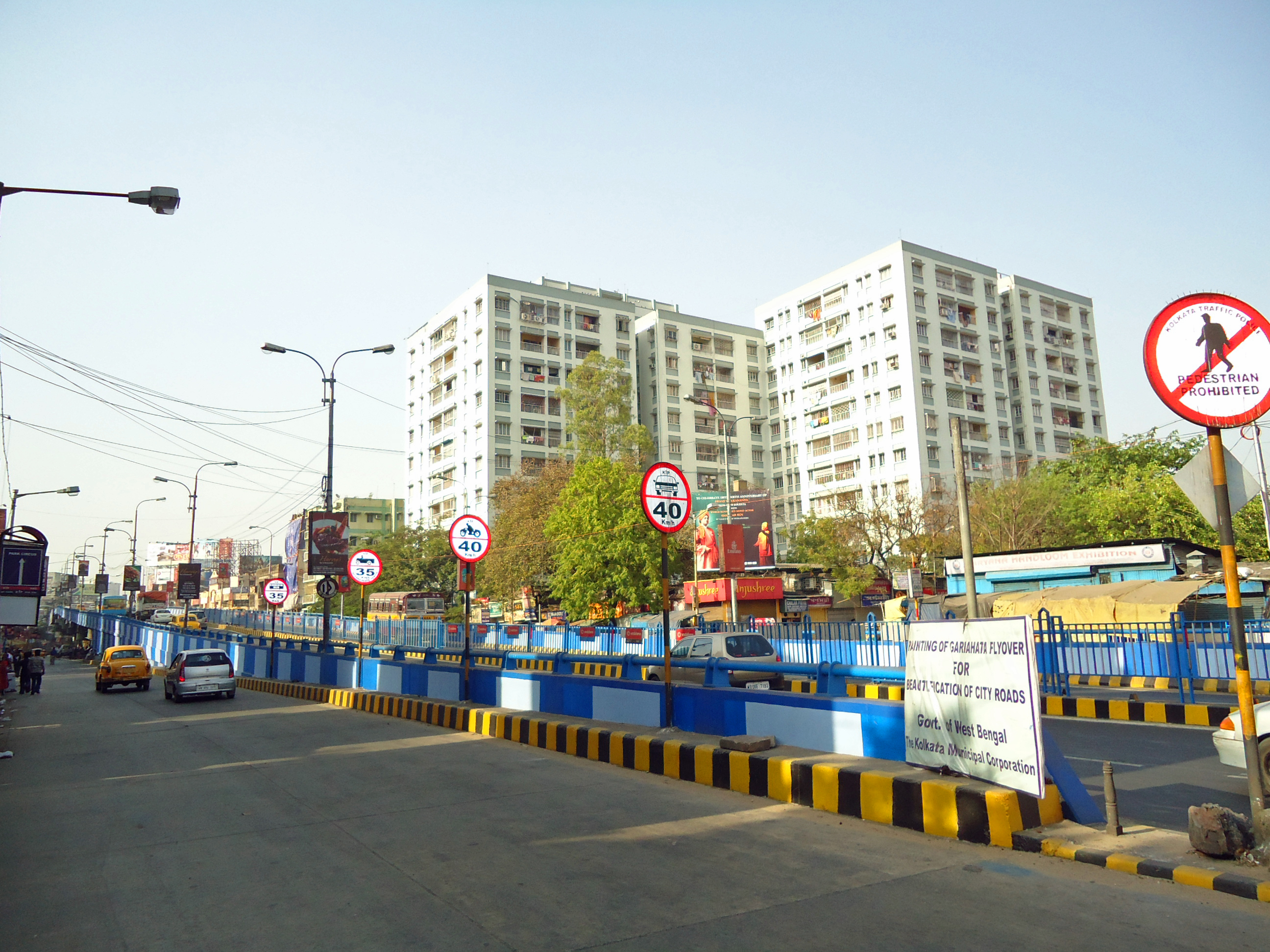
- Gariahat Road, Golpark

- Location in Kolkata
- Coordinates: 22.516363°N 88.366498°E
- Country: India
- State: West Bengal
- District: Kolkata
- City: Kolkata
- Metro Station: Kalighat; Hemanta Mukherjee
- KMC Wards: 68, 86

Governance
- PIN: 700019
- Planning agency: KMDA
- Civic agency: Kolkata Municipal Corporation
- Website: www.kmcgov.in

Gariahat Road connects Ballygunge Phari with Prince Anwar Shah Road and Raja SC Mallick Road near Jadavpur Police station in the southern part of Kolkata, India. The space under Gariahat Flyover hosts one of the most prominent open air public chess playing areas in Kolkata. It is also a part of SH 1.

== Localities ==
Gariahat falls under Ballygunge area and is a Retail Market for saris (not only from typical Bengal but from all across India), electronics, and restaurants. It is the hub and shopping capital of South Kolkata.

It is one of the main roads of South Kolkata that starts from Ballygunge Phari-Hazra Road crossing and from there travels southwards towards the Gariahat market. The Ballygunge AC market and the Dakshinapan shopping center are two of the main attractions that one will find on the Gariahat Road. A newly built mall named Mukti World, came up near Ballygunge Phari joining the bandwagon of malls in Kolkata. Many handicraft and textiles emporium of government can also be seen here. A huge number of jewellery shops are also located here. Gariahat is also famous for its fish market. It connects to / intersects some of the most important roads of the city namely Ballygunge Circular Road, Hazra Road, Rashbehari Avenue, Southern Avenue and Prince Anwar Shah Road. Smaller roads like Garcha Road, Dover Lane, Hindustan Road, Ekdalia Road, South End Park, etc. all originate from Gariahat Road.

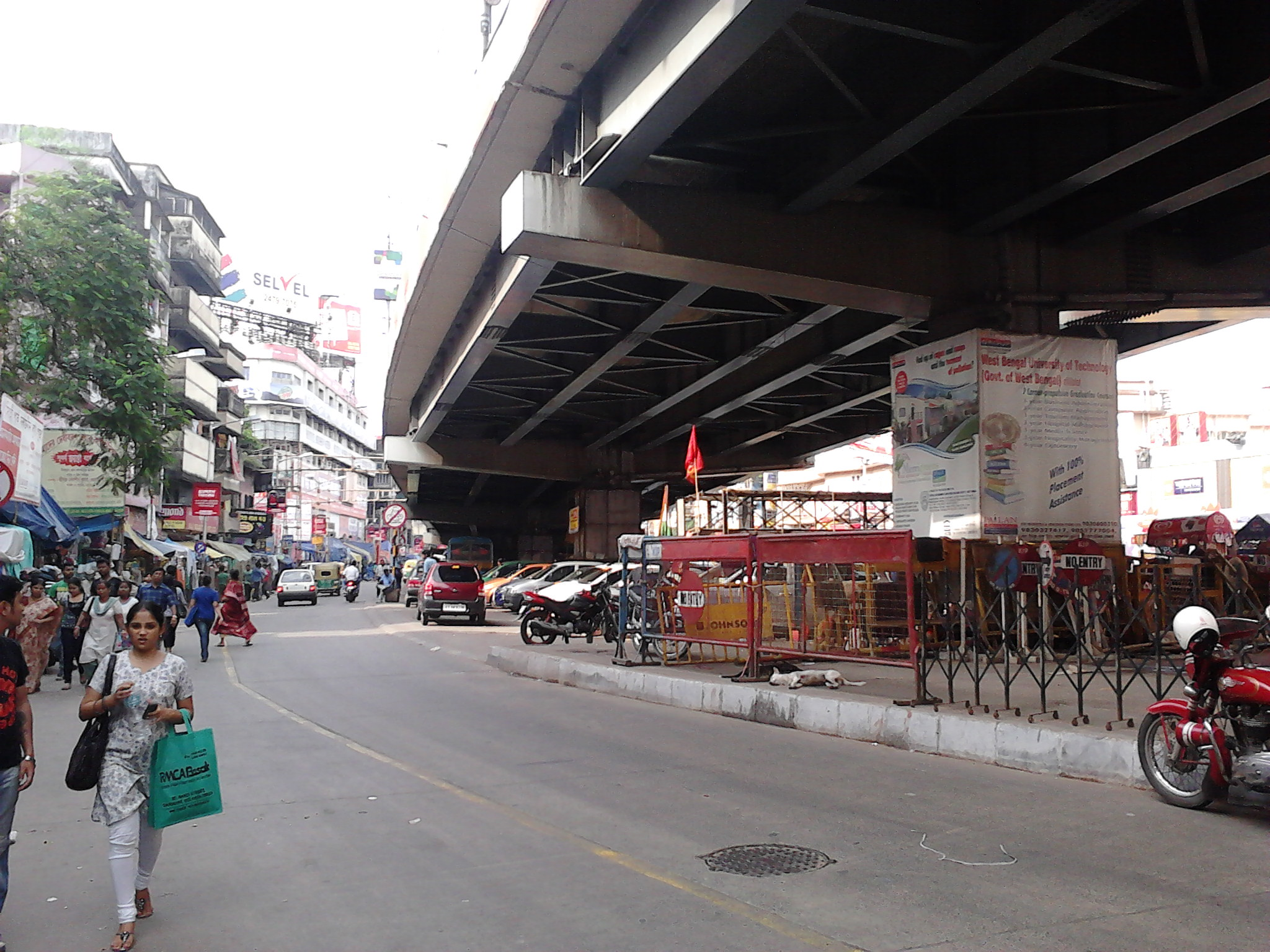
Gariahat Road and Flyover at Rashbehari Avenue crossing

One of the most important stretch of South Kolkata starts from Park Circus Crossing (where it is known as Syed Amir Ali Avenue), and heads south through Ashutosh Chowdhury Avenue (known as Old Ballygunge Road) with Birla Mandir, Calcutta Cricket and Football Club (CCFC), Birla Industrial and Technological Museum on its sides. The famous Gurusaday Dutta Road joins here. Then bears the name Gariahat Road from Ballygunge Phari and passes by Gol Park, and moves on to Dhakuria Bridge after which it is known as Gariahat Road (South), having Jodhpur Park to its right and Dhakuria/Selimpur to its left (East). The road eventually connects to Raja SC Mullick Road (which goes down further south up to Garia) at the intersection of Prince Anwar Shah Road and Jadavpur Police station. Jadavpur University happens to be one of the major landmarks at one end of this road as it winds its way down from Park Circus, Ballygunge, Gariahat Crossing, Gol Park [Ramakrishna Mission Institute of Culture, Kankulia/Keyatala], Dhakuria & Jodhpur Park.

The stretch from the Gariahat crossing to the Park Circus crossing, passes through the Ballygunge area.

== Chess arena ==
After the Gariahat flyover was built, the local government in collaboration with the police converted the area under the flyover into a public chess arena. Lit by floodlights, it consists of a series of chess tables and chairs, where people can come freely and play chess with each other. The spot quickly turned into a popular championship spot for new as well as existing chess talent and aficionados. It was covered on NDTV by the journalist Ravish Kumar in January 2019, when he accidentally noticed this on a trip to Kolkata.

== Landmarks ==
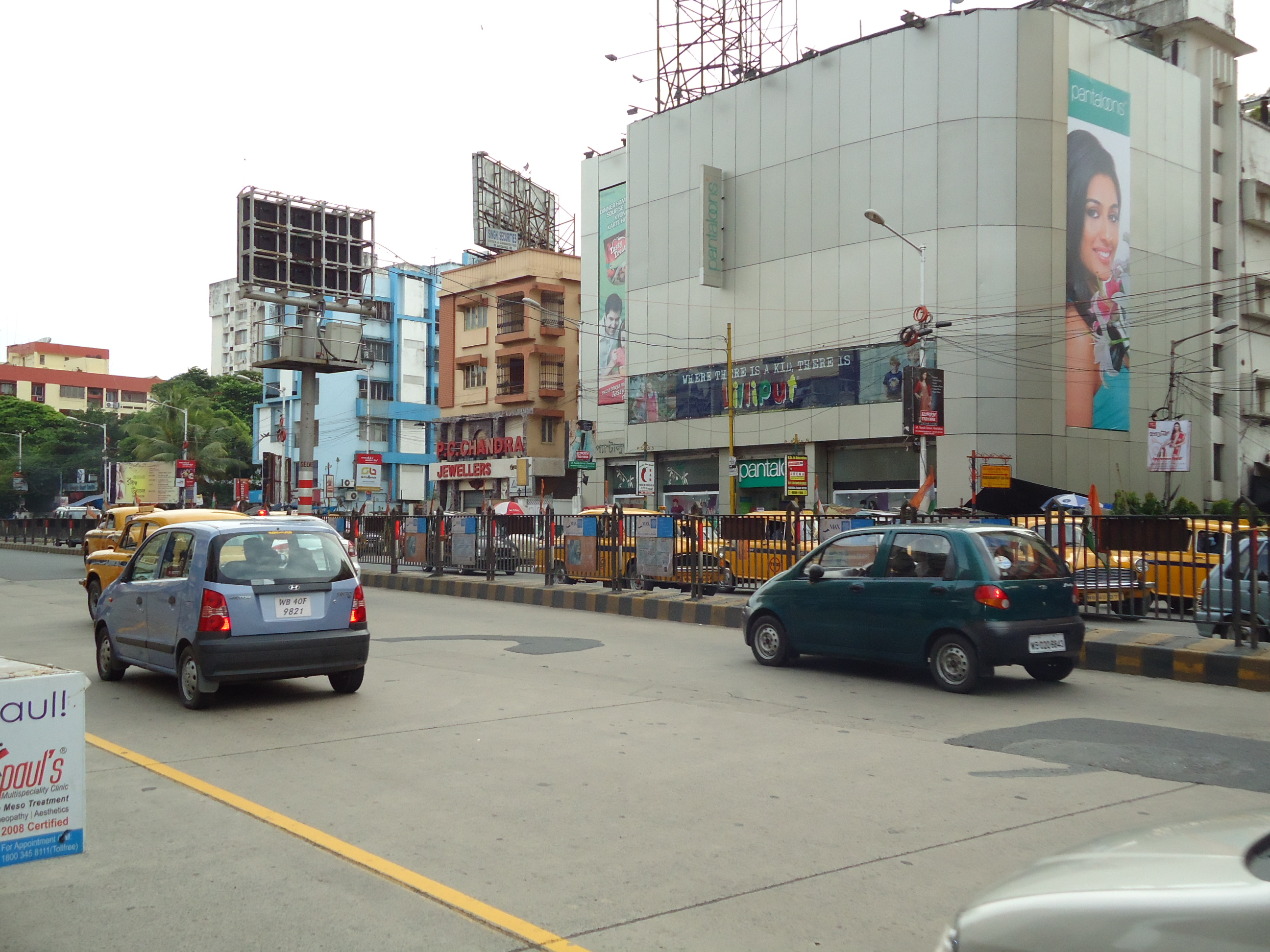
Gariahat Road 'Pantaloons'

- Mukti World Mall
- City Eye Care Centre
- Industrial Training Institute, Gariahat
- CESC South zone office
- Ballygunge Shiksha Sadan school
- Pantaloons
- Ballygunge New Market
- Gariahat Market
- Ramakrishna Mission Institute of Culture
- AMRI Hospital, Dhakuria
- Indian Oil Bhawan
- Dakshinapan shopping center
- Carmel Convent school

== Restaurants & Eateries ==
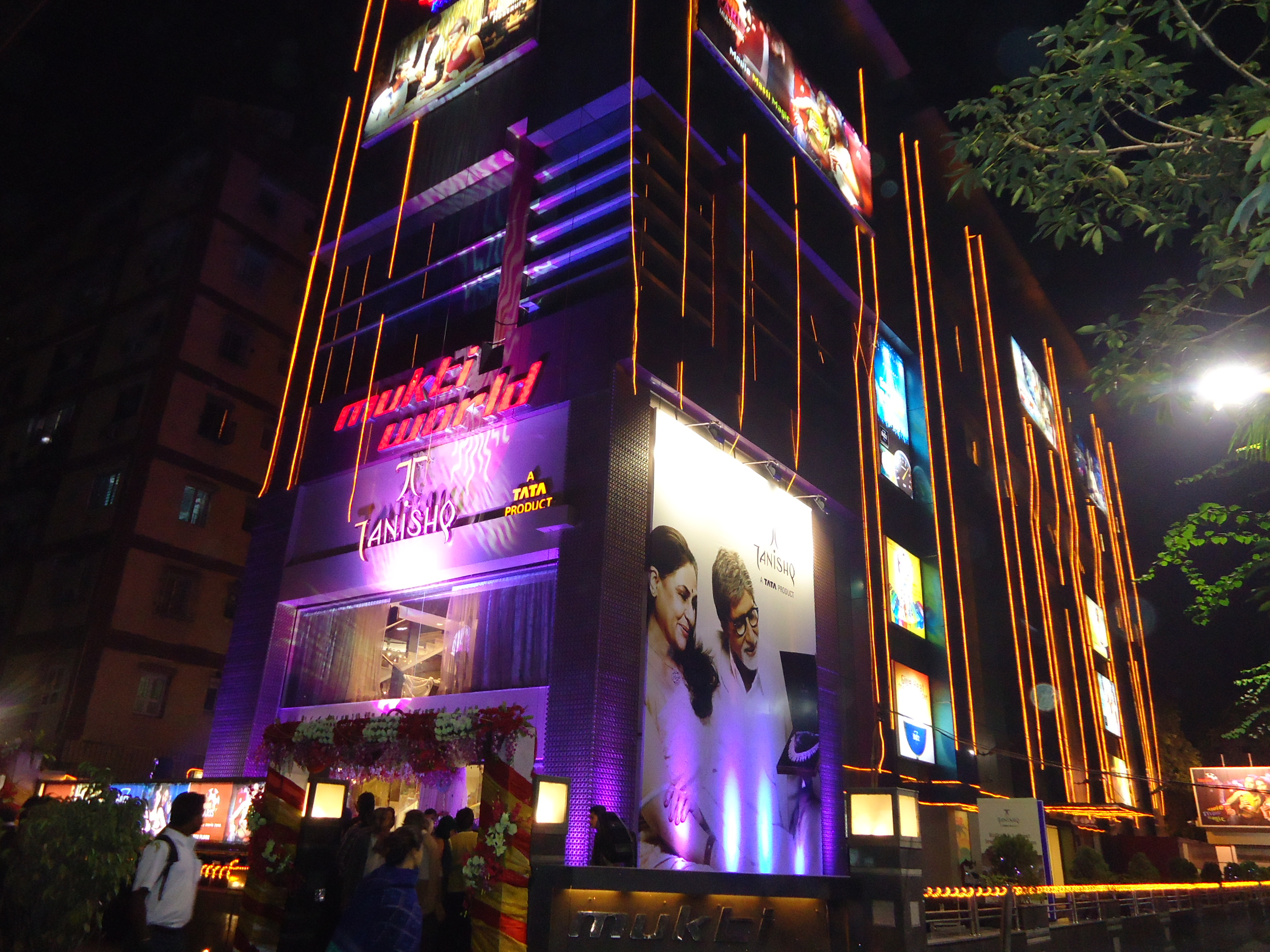
Mukti World night view

- 6 Ballygunge Place
- Kwality
- Saptarshi
- Spices & Sauces
- Domino's Pizza, Jodhpur Park
