= Carlton Kitto =

Indian bebop jazz guitarist

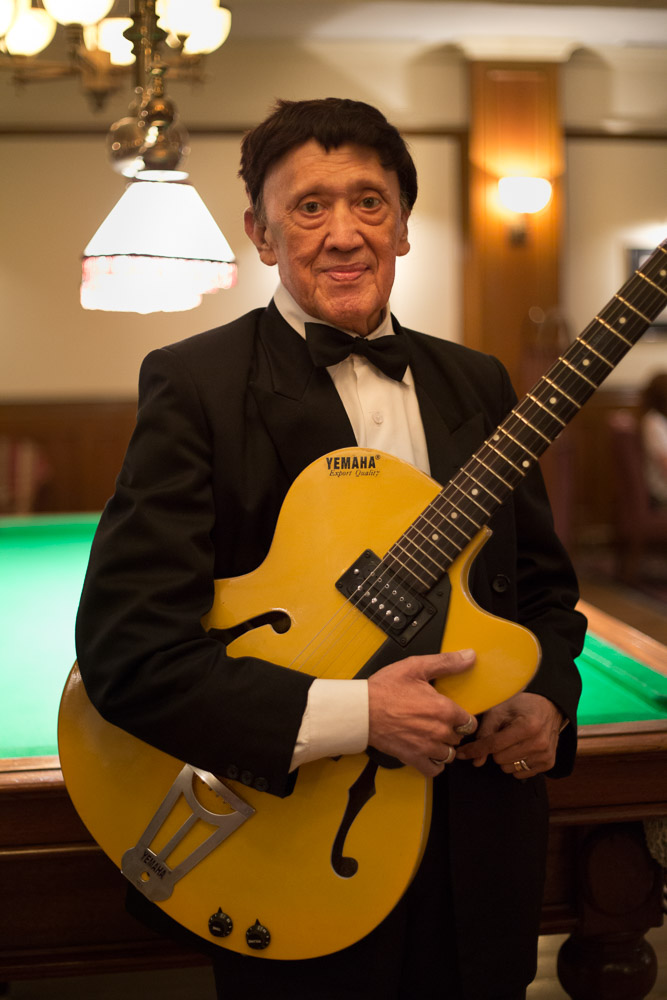
Carlton Kitto at the Oberoi Grand Hotel, Kolkata, 2012

Carlton Kitto (c. 1942 – 28 November 2016) was a bebop jazz guitarist from Kolkata, India. He was born in Bangalore, where he started working in the railways in his early days. Kitto later started his music career in Chennai in the 1960s. He moved to Kolkata in 1973 and became a part of the band Jazz Ensemble in Moulin Rogue, an upscale restaurant in Park Street, Kolkata. After two years he started playing in another restaurant named Mocambo in the same locality. He was a teacher of jazz and classical guitar at the Calcutta School of Music and also performed in some of the restaurants and pubs, such as the Chowringhee Bar, Trincas, Blue Fox and Someplace Else in Kolkata."All that jazz". The Times of India. 10 February 2011. Archived from the original on 3 January 2013. Kitto had the distinction of playing along with other legendary jazz musicians such as Sonny Rollins, Clark Terry, David Leibman, Larry Coryell, Chico Freeman and Charlie Byrd.

The independent documentary film Finding Carlton -Uncovering the story of Jazz in India completed in 2012, www.findingcarlton.com, pays tribute to Carlton Kitto whilst telling the fascinating story of how jazz came to India. The filmmaker Susheel Kurien compiled extensive interviews and live performance footage that is a historical archive of the Carlton Kitto story.

Kitto died on 28 November 2016 at the age of 74 after a long illness.
