= Ballygunge Circular Road =

Road in Kolkata, India

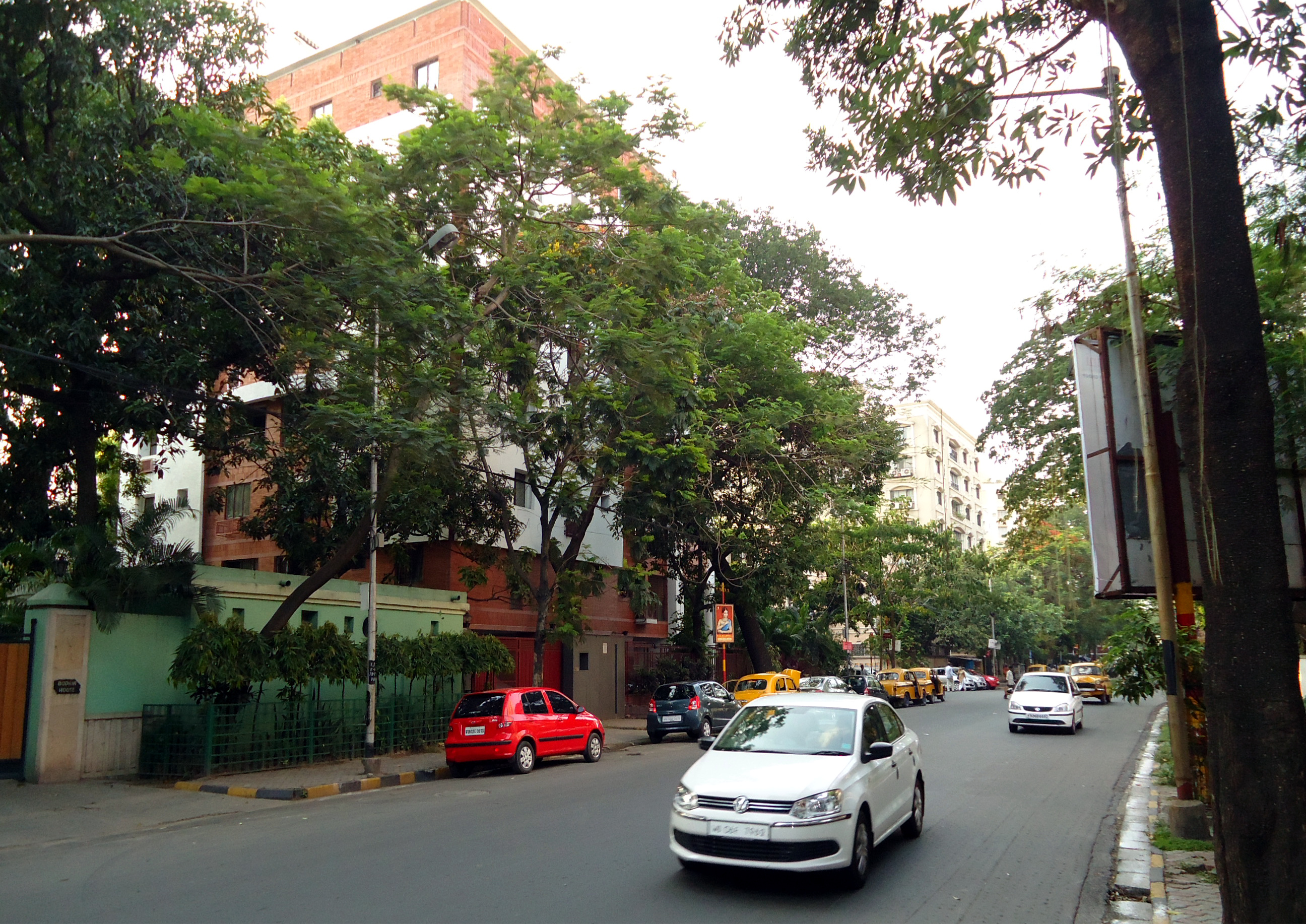
A stretch of B C Road

Ballygunge Circular Road which was renamed as Promotesh Barua Sarani (PIN Kolkata 700019), after the legendary actor and doyen of Bengali Cinema, is one of the most important roads which runs through the upscale part of Ballygunge in South Kolkata. It starts near the Ballygunge Science College right off Gariahat Road, passing through landmarks like Tripura House, St Lawrence High School etc. before meeting Gurusaday Dutta Road about a mile up the road. It then finally meets AJC Bose Road a bit further up. A large military camp (known as Ballygunge Maidan Camp) is located on the North-Western stretch of the road, starting right after the David Hare Training College and ending at the intersection of Chakraberia Road.

== Localities ==
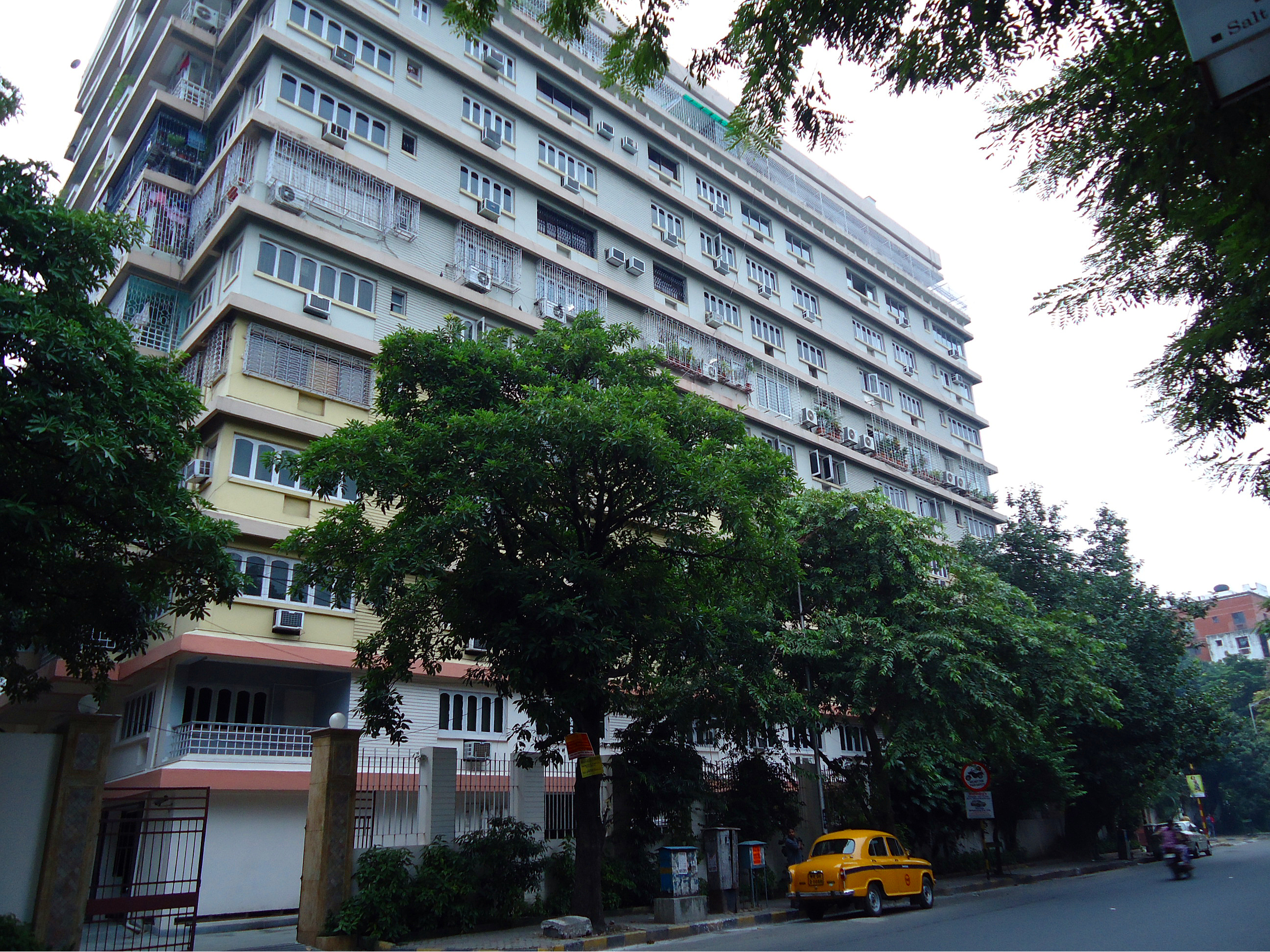
Paramount Apartments

It is surrounded by nice residential houses in the vicinity of Tripura House, mainly in the stretch between the Science College and St. Lawrence High School. Some of the finest residential apartments as well as posh villas dot this road. Many prominent residential spots like "Vedant Apartments", on the plot that used to house legendary Bengali actress Suchitra Sen’s bungalow, have sprung up recently. "Devadwar" at 34 Ballygunge Circular Road is considered to be one of the best residential buildings in the city. Other notable plush high rise apartments include "Paramount", "Uttarayan", "Aishwarya" ,"Le Palmerie", "The Residency", "Tripura Enclave", "Surya", "Balaka", "Tivoli Court" and the upcoming Sky villas "Shiromani" and "Sri Avani". Ballygunge Circular Road is surrounded by other upscale and posh areas of Ballygunge like Gurusaday Dutta Road, Rainey Park, Rowland Road, Lovelock Street, Ritchie Road, Dover Road, Dover Park, and Queens Park. There are other landmarks such as the Max Mueller Bhavan (Goethe Institute), (which has now shifted to Park Mansions) "Miranda Hall" — one of the most exclusive Montessori schools in Kolkata was also situated on this road.

== Landmarks ==
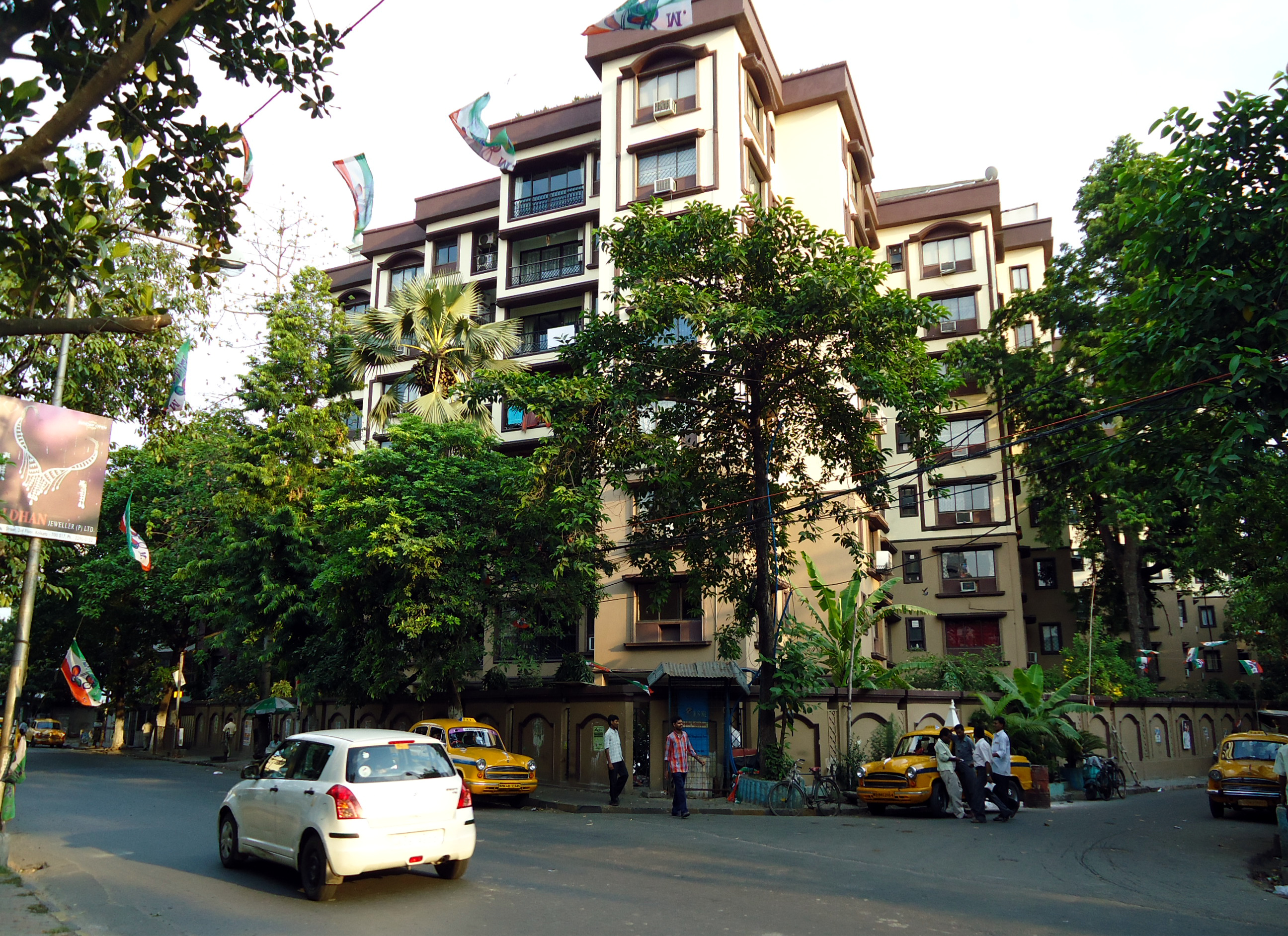
Devadwar

1. Department of Jute & Fibre Technology, Institute of Jute Technology, C.U.
2. Ballygunge Science College
3. Surya Apartments
4. Naba Kailash Apartments
5. Calcutta Cosmopolitan Club
6. Devadwar
7. Budhia House
8. Tripura Enclave
9. Tripura House
10. Santosh Estate
11. St Lawrence High School
12. David Hare Training College
13. Paramount
14. Le Palmerie
15. Ballygunge Maidan Camp
16. Calcutta Punjab Club
17. Kendriya Vidyalaya
18. Automobile Association of Eastern India Club
19. Rainey Park Residency
20. Tivoli Court
21. Sona Villa (estd 1901)
22. Balaka

Heritage property on 53 Ballygunge Circular Road

== Notable residents ==
- Suchitra Sen – Actress and mother of actress Moon Moon Sen and grandmother of Riya Sen and Raima Sen.
- Aditya Vikram Sengupta – National Award Winning Filmmaker (Asha Jaoar Majhe), Cinematographer and Artist
- Ashwika Kapur – India's ONLY girl GREEN OSCAR Winner in a Global Category and the youngest Girl Winner in the world.
- Indrani Sen – An exponent of Rabindrasangeet and Nazrulgeeti a professor of Bagbazar women's college.

== Restaurants ==
- Chatar Patar
- Red Hot Chili Pepper
- Sanjha Chulha
- Ganges
- 24 hr Cafe Coffee Day
- Mama mia Gelato
- Azad Hind Dhaba
- Sharma Dhaba

== See also ==
- Park Street
- Camac Street
- Sudder Street
