= Shiraz Golden Restaurant =

- Interactive map of Shiraz Golden Restaurant

Restaurant information
- Established: 1941
- Location: Kolkata, India, West Bengal
- Coordinates: 22°32′47.18″N 88°21′35.50″E

Shiraz Golden Restaurant or Shiraz is a restaurant located at Park Street, Kolkata, India. This was the first restaurant to serve Mughlai cuisine in Kolkata. In 2016, the restaurant completed 75 years. Shiraz has several outlets across the country.

== History ==
Shiraz was founded in 1941. In 1972 Shamshuddin Bawarchi joined the restaurant as a cook, and introduced new recipes of preparing biryani. One of the ancestors of Shamsuddin was a cook of Wajid Ali Shah.
