= Dakshinapan Shopping Center =

Shopping center in Kolkata, India

Coordinates: 22.5667°N 88.3667°E

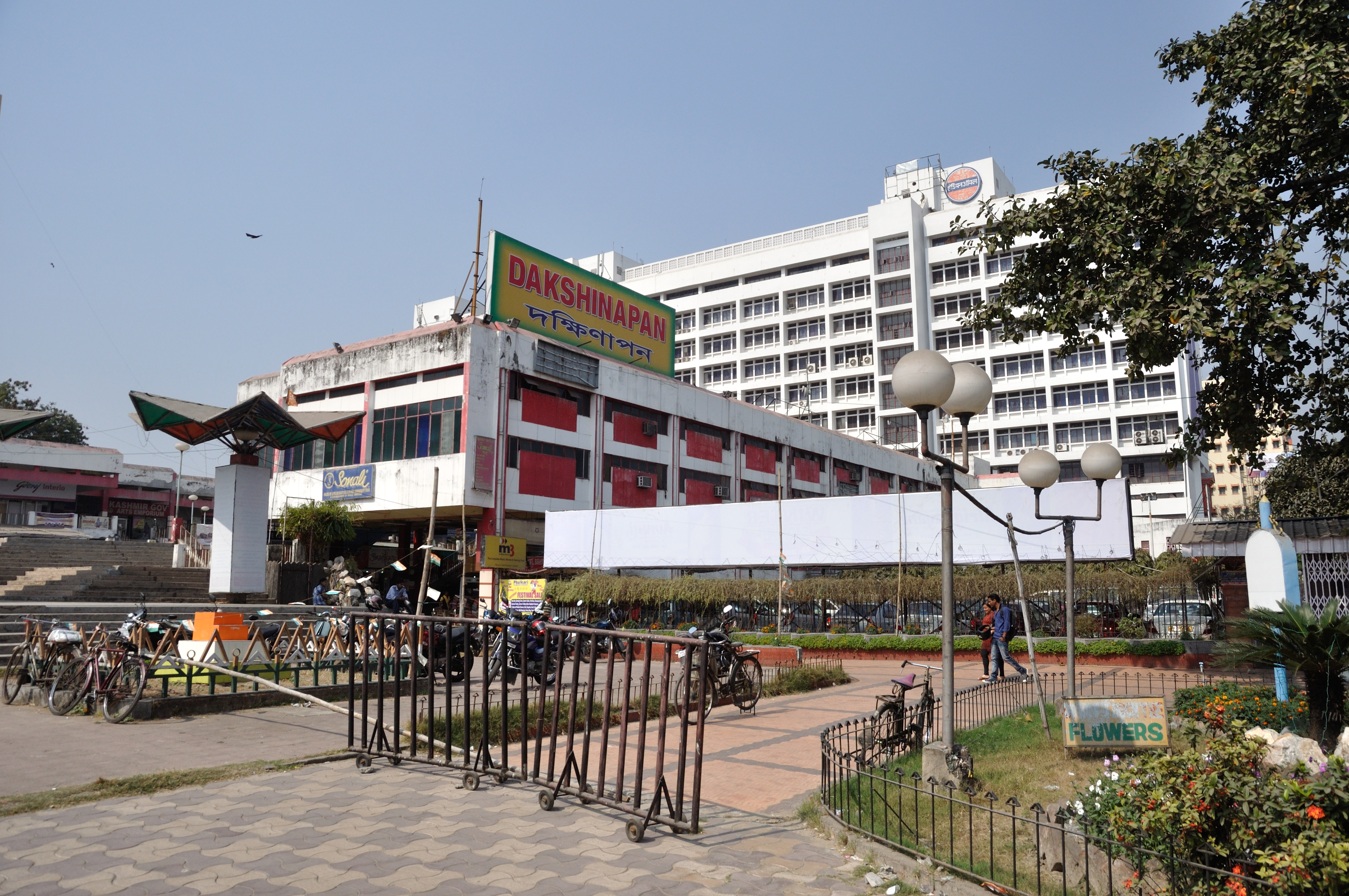
The Dakshinapan, Dhakuria

The Dakshinapan Shopping Center is on Gariahat Road, right at the foot of Dhakuria Rail Overbridge (Shri Chaitanya Mahaprabhu Setu) in Dhakuria, Kolkata. It is spread over 57,000 sqft area and has 141 shops. It was launched by the Kolkata Improvement Trust (KIT) in 1988. It is an open-air cultural spot cum shopping complex, the latter consisting mainly of various types of State emporiums from all over India dealing in handlooms, handicrafts, textiles, furniture, fancy goods and imitation jewelry. It also houses Madhusudan Mancha and Children Little Theater. Madhusudan Mancha stages dramas, dances, recitals and other forms of performing arts organized by leading professional artists as well as theatre groups in the city. During 15th Kolkata Film festival in 2009, Madhusudan Mancha hosted 28 films.

== See also ==
- Madhusudan Mancha
