= Arthur Kitchin =

Archdeacon of Calcutta from 1903 to 1907

Arthur Kitchin (14 March 1855 – 17 February 1928) was Archdeacon of Calcutta from 1903 to 1907.

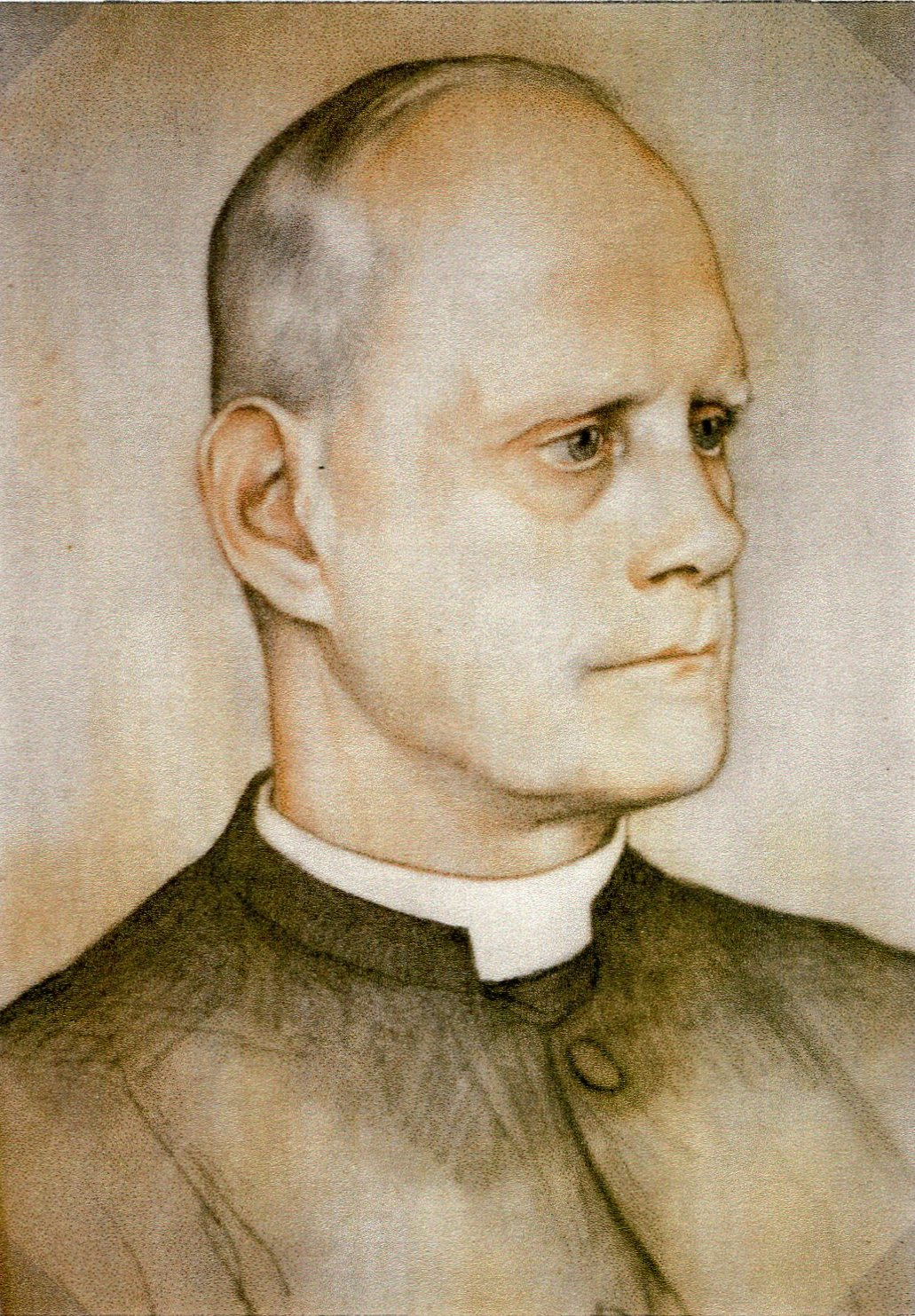
Arthur Kitchin (1855-1928)

Arthur Kitchin was the eldest son of Joseph and Fanny Kitchin of Westerham, Kent. He married Edith Ann Everard on 29 March 1883, shortly before sailing to India on 18 April where he remained until May 1905.

Kitchin was educated at Westminster School and Christ Church, Oxford. He was ordained Deacon in 1878; and Priest in 1879. After curacies at Bexley Heath and Gulval he served at St James', Calcutta and St Paul's Cathedral, Calcutta and St Thomas', Calcutta. On his return from India he was Rector of Rushden from 1905 to 1913; and also Rural Dean of Higham Ferrers from 1906 to 1913. He was then Vicar of Hardingstone from 1913 until his death.
