= Elgin Fairlawn, Kolkata =

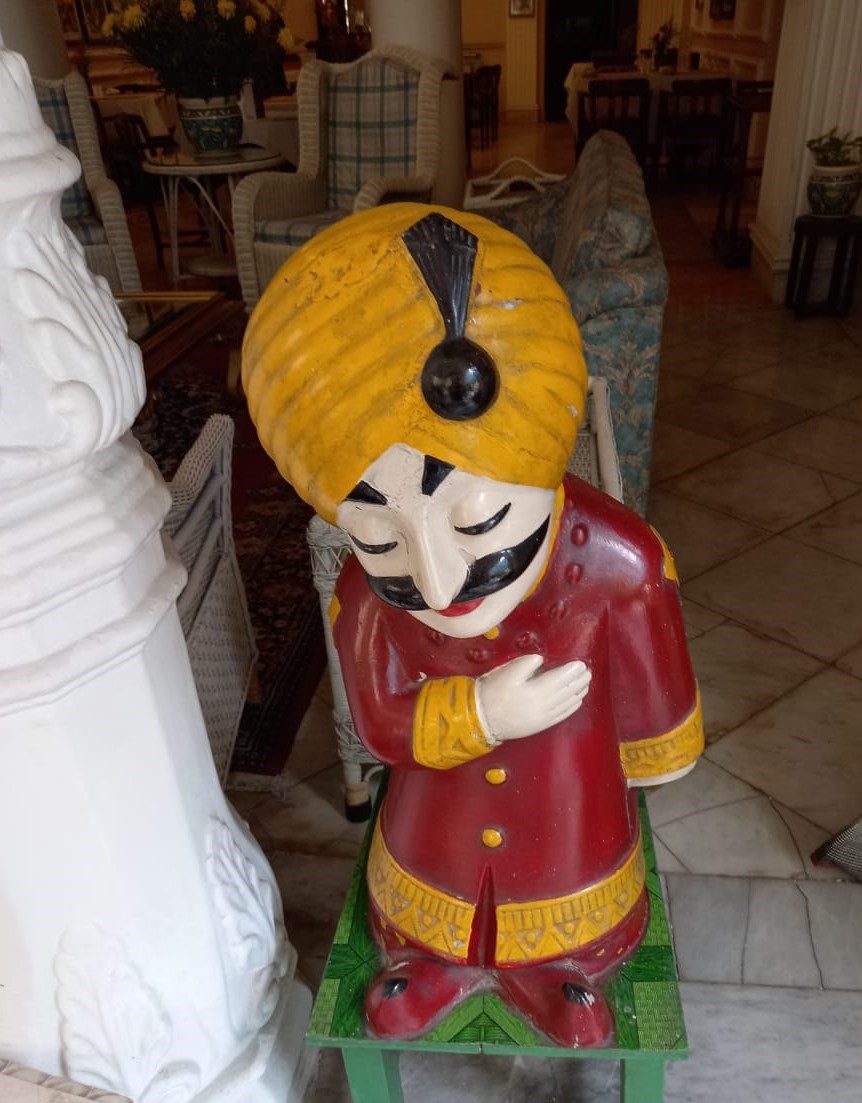
- The mascot of the Elgin Fairlawn hotel
- Interactive map of the Elgin Fairlawn, Kolkata area

General information
- Location: India, Kolkata; 13/A, Sudder Street, 700016
- Coordinates: 22.55867°N 88.35269°E
- Owner: Elgin Hotels Pvt. Ltd.
- Operator: Elgin Hotels Pvt. Ltd.

Website
- Official Website

Elgin Fairlawn, Kolkata (formerly known as Fairlawn Hotel) is a heritage hotel owned by Elgin Hotels and Resorts. It is located on Sudder Street of Kolkata. Initially built as a house, it was later turned into a hotel in 1936.

== History ==
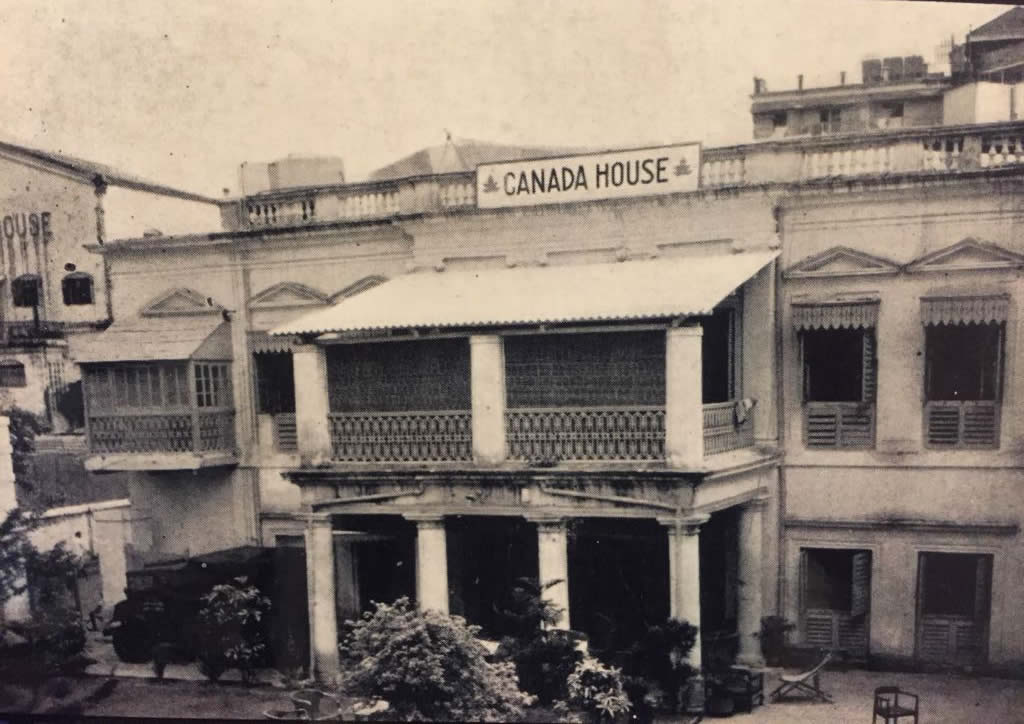
From the hotel's collection: The Elgin Fairlawn when it was known as 'Canada House' in 1908. .

The colonial bungalow was built in 1783 by an Englishman William Ford, when Warren Hastings was the Governor General. The house on Sudder Street became a hotel in 1936 after passing into the hands of Mrs. Rose Smith (née Sarkies) of Armenian roots. During the Second World War, the property was requisitioned for Canadian Airforce personnel and was known as "Canada House" for two years. During this time, it also functioned as a residential quarter of Air Force Major Melvyn Douglas and his family. In February 2018, the hotel was acquired by Elgin Hotels & Resorts.

== Architecture ==
The hotel's architecture is characterized by colonial-style elements, including a white facade, arched windows, and wrought-iron railings. Its verandas are furnished with vintage wooden furniture, offering guests panoramic views of the city.

== Famous personalities at Elgin Fairlawn ==
Indian film actor Shashi Kapoor met his wife Jennifer Kendal at the hotel. The couple returned to the hotel after they got married in 1958 for their honeymoon. Shashi Kapoor liked spending time in the hotel, specially in the Room No. 17 — which later on became known as the Shashi Kapoor Room.

Felicity Kendal, the British actress and also the sister of Jennifer Kendal has spent some time with her family in the hotel. She wrote in 2012 - "I loved it here, and it is from this hotel that I left, aged 17, to try my luck in England, my father’s disapproval ringing in my ears."

The hotel has hosted a great many personalities such as British playwright and screenwriter Tom Stoppard, British actress Julie Christie, British musician Sting, British television actor Clive Anderson, Royal Artist Norman Hutchinson and his wife Gloria, Landscape Artist Julian Barrow, British art historian Dan Cruikshank, British journalist and writer Ian Hislop, German novelist Gunter Grass, British film and television actor Michael Palin, travel writer Eric Newby and French Writer Dominique Lapierre who stayed at the hotel in 1985 while writing the story about Calcutta titled City of Joy. The novel was then made into a film in 1992 and the cast and crew of the film, including Patrick Swayze have also stayed here. Ismail Merchant and James Ivory, whose 1965 film Shakespeare Wallah was loosely based on and starred the Kendals, have also been guests at this hotel.

== Awards and nominations ==
=== 2023 ===
- Awarded Outstanding Contribution to Hospitality by the International Hospitality Council (IHC) London and the International Institute of Hotel Management (IIHM) Hospitality on the occasion of International Hospitality Day 2023.
- Nominated West Bengal's Leading Hotel by World Travel Awards 2023.

=== 2021 ===
- Awarded Travellers' Choice 2021 by TripAdvisor.

=== 2020 ===
- Awarded Travellers' Choice 2020 by TripAdvisor.
