= Industrial Training Institute, Gariahat =

Government Industrial training Institutes

Coordinates: 22°31′30.47″N 88°21′51.16″E

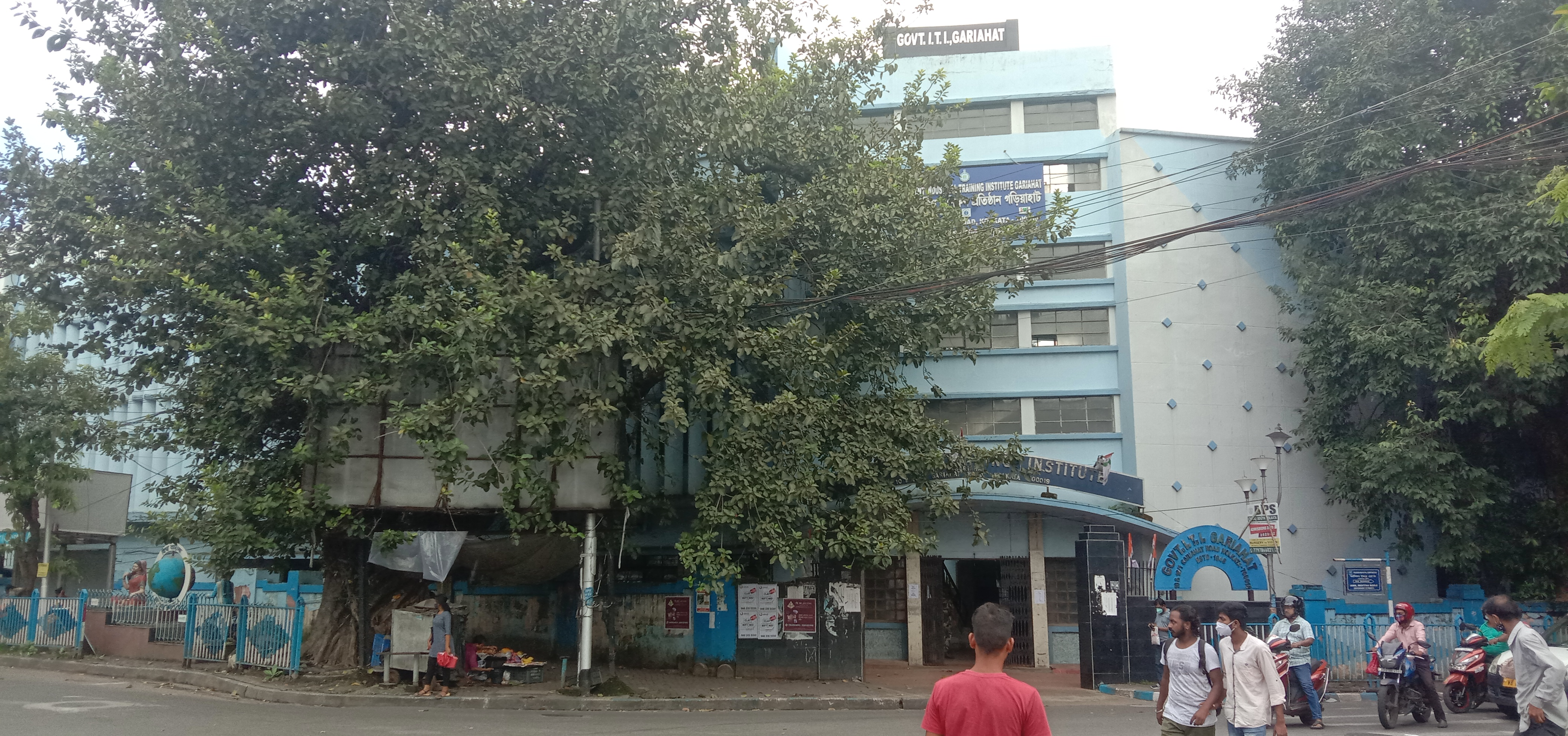
- Type: Training College
- Affiliations: National Council for Vocational Training
- Location: Gariahat Road, Kolkata, West Bengal, India
- Campus: Urban
- Website: iti.wb.gov.in/institute/home/gariahat

Industrial Training Institute Gariahat is one of the oldest government vocational training institutes, located in Gariahat Road, Kolkata, West Bengal. It offers different training courses in becoming a civil draughtsman, mechanical draughtsman, surveyor, instrument mechanic, electronic mechanic, diesel mechanic, motor vehicle mechanic, cutting and sewing, plumber, electrician, fitter, machinist, turner, welder, and wireman.

It takes part in several sports including football.
