= Mocambo (restaurant) =

Restaurant in Kolkata, India

Mocambo Restaurant and Bar
- Interactive map of Mocambo Restaurant and Bar

Restaurant information
- Established: 1956 by Shivji V. Kothari
- Owners: Nitin Kothari; Siddharth Kothari
- Previous owner: Shivji V. Kothari
- Food type: continental cuisine
- Dress code: semi-formal
- Location: Ground Floor, 25B, Free School Street, Taltala, Kolkata, West Bengal, 700016, India
- Coordinates: 22°33′12″N 88°21′02″E
- Reservations: recommended
- Website: mocamborestaurantandbar.shop

Mocambo is a historic fine-dining restaurant located on Park Street, Kolkata, West Bengal, India. Established in 1956 by Shivji V. Kothari, Mocambo is widely recognized as India's first nightclub, which is plausible, even though impossible to verify. The restaurant is renowned for its Continental cuisine and has maintained its original décor and menu since its inception.

== History ==
=== Foundation and Early Years (1956-1970s) ===
Mocambo was founded in the summer of 1956 by Shivji V. Kothari (also known as Shivji Velji Kothari), who insisted on running the restaurant according to European standards. Recognizing that Europeans were considered the finest restaurateurs and confectioners, Kothari recruited Antonio Prandhe, an Italian chef who became Mocambo's first chef-cum-manager. Prandhe was instrumental in shaping Mocambo's identity, creating a menu that featured classic European and Italian dishes such as Chicken Sicilian, Cannelloni, Chicken à la Kiev, Chicken Stroganoff, and Chateaubriand Beef Steak. The restaurant's décor was designed by Mr. Messerschmidt, a German architect, and has remained virtually unchanged since 1956, preserving its original color scheme and aesthetic.

Mocambo opened as one of India's first nightclubs, featuring live music with a six-piece band fronted by Anton Menezes, along with male and female crooners. The establishment boasted a psychedelic glass dance floor and hosted performances by notable artists, including 17-year-old jazz singer Pam Crain, who became famous at Mocambo before moving on to other venues. The nightclub atmosphere made Mocambo a sophisticated, elite entertainment destination that captured the imagination of Kolkata's social scene during the 1960s and 1970s. However, due to the Naxal movement and heavy entertainment taxes imposed by the state government, live music was discontinued in the early 1970s, and the dance floor was converted into additional seating space.

=== Transition to Pure Restaurant (1970s-Present) ===
After discontinuing live entertainment, Mocambo successfully transitioned into a pure fine-dining restaurant while maintaining its reputation for continental cuisine. The restaurant continued to attract celebrities, dignitaries, and food enthusiasts, cementing its status as a Kolkata institution.

== Cuisine and Specialties ==
Mocambo's menu has remained largely unchanged since 1956, featuring classic Continental and European dishes.

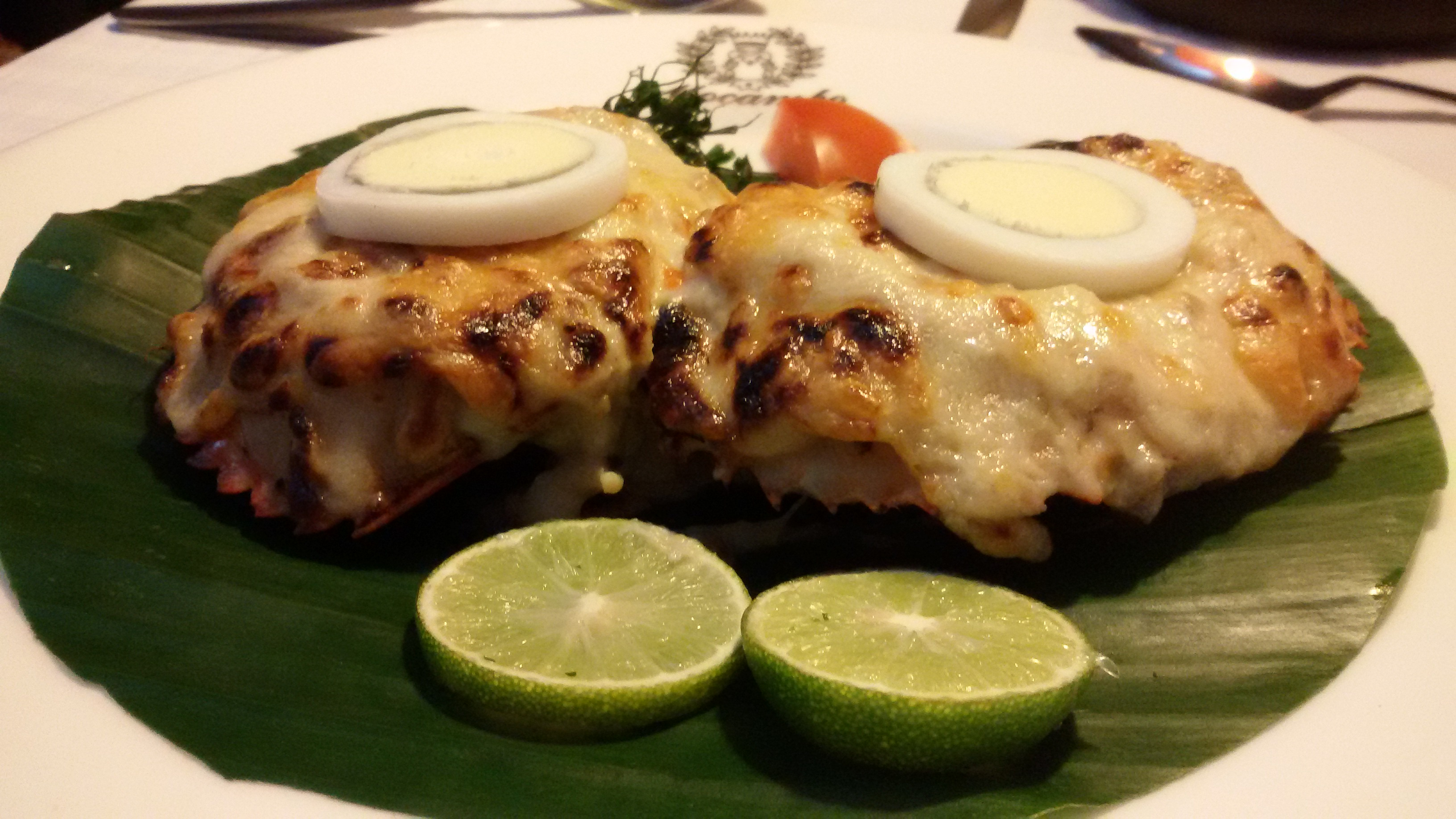
Devilled Crab at Mocambo set on a banana leaf garnished with slices of boiled egg and lime

=== Heritage Dishes (marked with 'H' or "Heritage" on the menu) ===
- Devilled Crab [sic] - A signature seafood preparation
- Chicken à la Kiev - Introduced to Kolkata by Antonio Prandhe in 1956
- Chicken Tetrazzini - Classic Italian-American pasta dish
- Fish à la Diane - Continental fish preparation
- Chateaubriand Beef Steak - Premium beef preparation

=== Other Popular Items ===
- Prawn Cocktail
- Chicken Cordon Bleu
- Ham Steak
- Chicken Sicilian
- Cannelloni
- Chicken Stroganoff
- Baked Alaska - Signature dessert

== Controversies ==
=== Discrimination Allegation (2016) ===
In September 2016, Mocambo faced significant public backlash following a viral Facebook post by customer Dilashi Hemnani, who alleged that she and her driver were denied entry to the restaurant based on discriminatory practices, calling the policy racist. The post garnered over 34,000 shares and 8,200 responses, mostly critical of the restaurant. Mocambo management defended their decision, stating that the driver was "very indecently dressed" and "not in proper state," having been eating roadside food and not maintaining appropriate standards for their fine-dining establishment. They emphasized they had no formal dress code but maintained standards of cleanliness and appropriate behavior. The controversy highlighted debates about accessibility, class distinctions, and service policies in upscale establishments.
