= Raja Subodh Chandra Mallick Road =

- Road in Kolkata (Calcutta)
- Location in Kolkata
- Coordinates: 22.4957°N 88.3705°E
- Country: India
- State: West Bengal
- District: Kolkata
- City: Kolkata

Government
  - Body: Kolkata Municipal Corporation
- Planning agency: KMDA

Raja Subodh Chandra Mallick Road is an important road that runs through Southern Kolkata connecting Jadavpur near Jadavpur Police station and Garia near Garia Crossing.

== Transport ==
=== By Rail ===
Jadavpur Rail Way Station , Dhakuria Railway Station are the very nearby railway station to Raja Subodh Chandra Mallick Road, Jadavpur.

=== Local Bus ===
Jadavpur 8b Stand Bus Station , Jadavpur Stn. Rd Bus Station , Raja S.C. Mullick Rd Bus Station , Raja S.C. Mullick Road. Bus Station , Raja Subodh Mullick Rd Bus Station are the nearby by Local Bus Stops to Raja Subodh Chandra Mallick Road, Jadavpur . runs Number of busses from Raja Subodh Chandra Mallick Road, Jadavpur to different Places.
