= St. Thomas Church, Kolkata =

St. Thomas Church
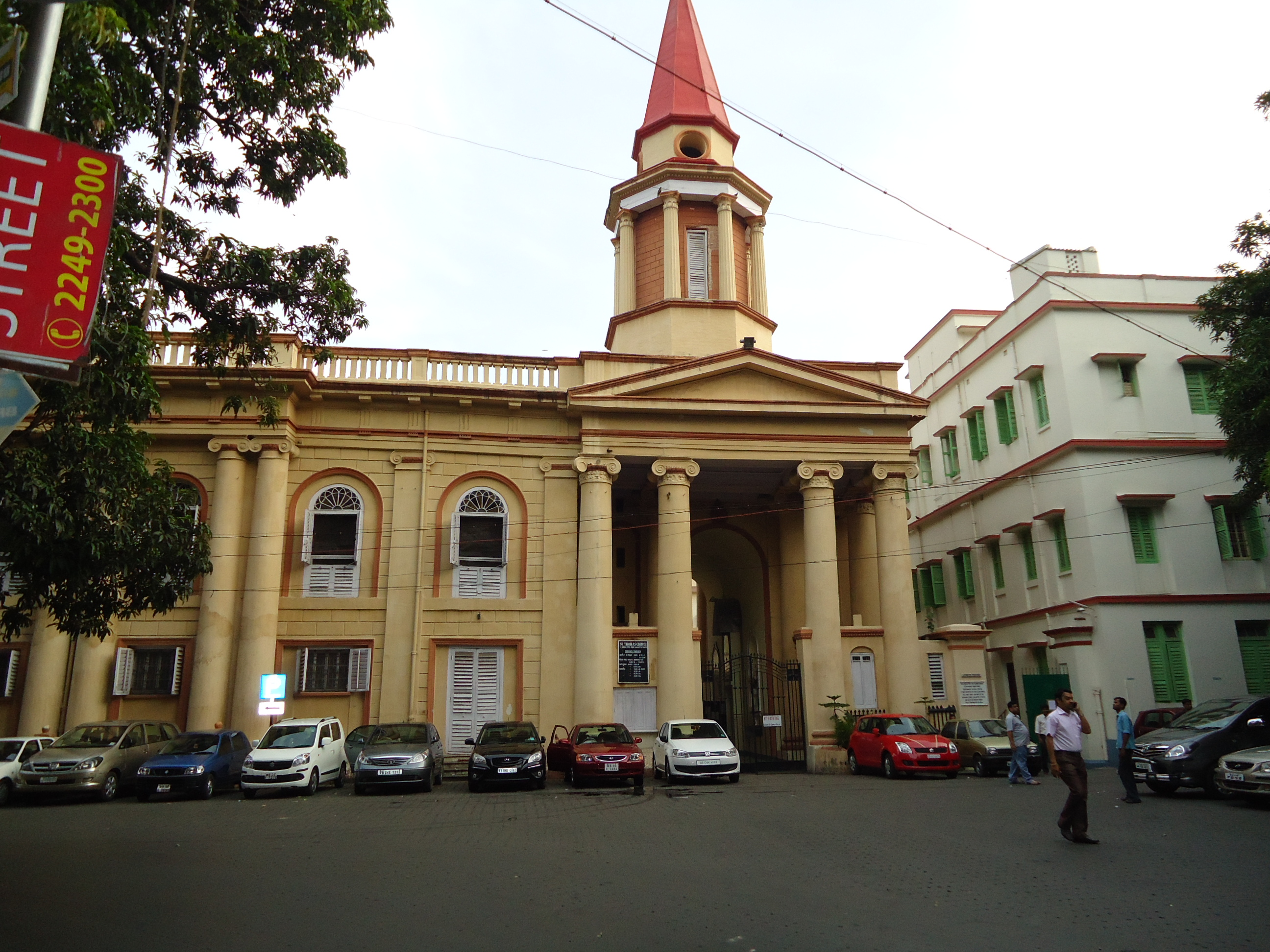
- St Thomas Church
- St. Thomas Church
- 22.550198°N 88.352224°E
- Location: Park Street, Kolkata
- Country: India
- Denomination: Roman Catholic
- Website: www.archdioceseofcalcutta.in

History
- Founded: 1842; 184 years ago

Architecture
- Functional status: Active
- Groundbreaking: 1841
- Completed: 5 May 1842

Administration
- Province: Archdiocese of Calcutta
- Archdiocese: Archdiocese of Calcutta

Clergy
- Archbishop: Thomas D’Souza

St. Thomas's Church is a Roman Catholic Latin Rite church in Kolkata, India. It is one of the colonial style buildings of the city. It is located in Middleton Row, Park Street. Mother Teresa lay in state in this church for one week prior to her funeral, in September 1997.

== History ==
On 11 September 1841, Mgr. Carew laid the foundation stone of St. Thomas' Church. It was Blessed on 5 May 1842, Ascension day, and officially opened to the public on 8 September 1842. It is the second parish established by Mgr. Carew in the City of Kolkata in 1844.

St. Thomas Church

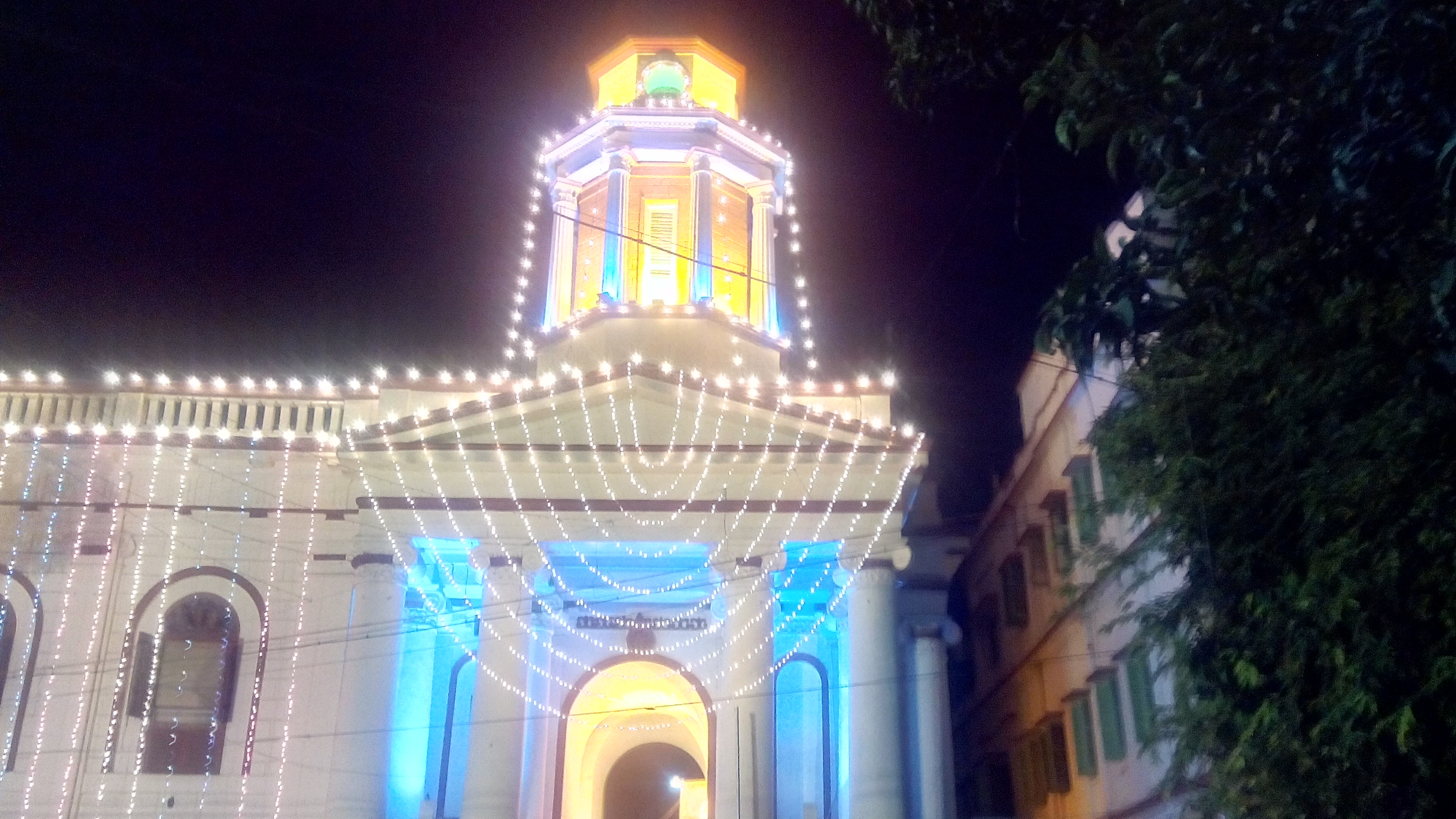
at Christmas
