= Madhusudan Mancha =

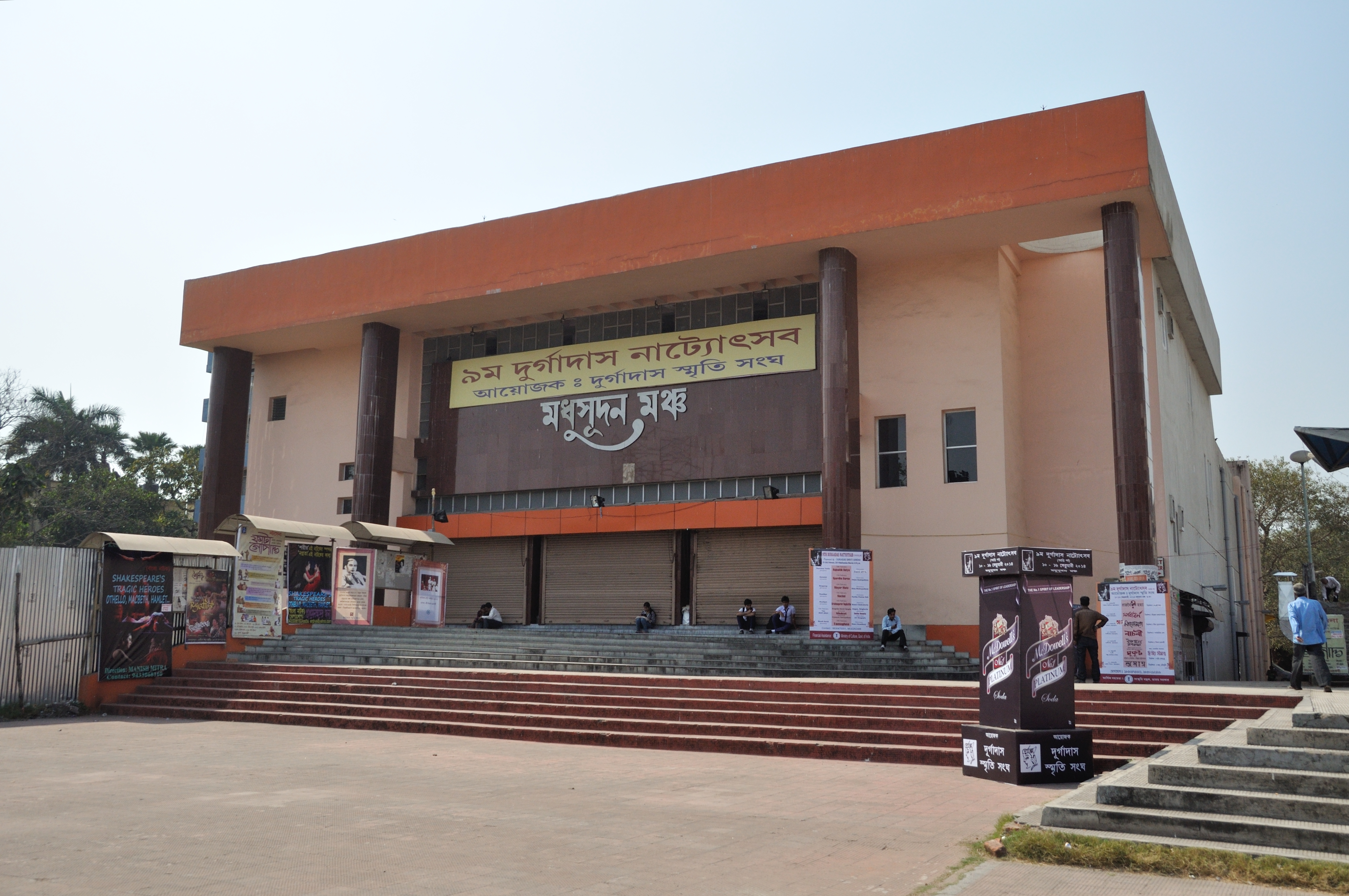

General information
- Location: Dhakuria, Kolkata
- Address: 2, C V Raman Road Kolkata. PIN: 700068
- Opened: 12 October 1995

Madhusudan Mancha is an auditorium in Dhakuria, Kolkata, West Bengal, India. It is named after Bengali poet Michael Madhusudan Dutt. This is controlled and managed by the Information and Cultural Affairs Department, Government of West Bengal. This auditorium is regularly used for theatres. This auditorium is inaugurated on 12 October 1995 by Jyoti Basu, Chief Minister of West Bengal at that time.
