= Mirza Ghalib Street =

Road in Kolkata, India

- Rani Rasmoni Road
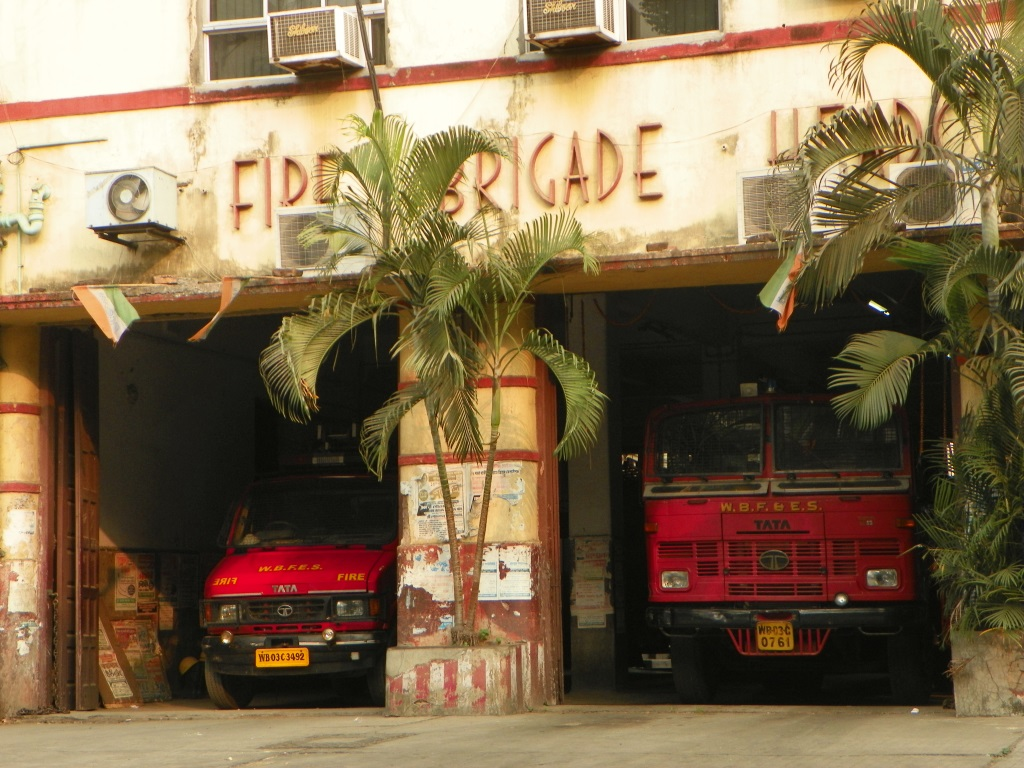
- West Bengal Fire Brigade Headquarters, Free School Street
- Former name: Free School Street
- Maintained by: Kolkata Municipal Corporation
- Location: Kolkata, India
- Postal code: 700016, 700087
- Nearest Kolkata Metro station: Esplanade, Park Street
- north end: Surendranath Banerjee Road (S. N. Banerjee Road)
- south end: Park Street

Mirza Ghalib Street, previously known as Free School Street, is a street that joins Surendranath Banerjee Road (Janbazar) with Park Street (Park Mansion) in Central Kolkata. North of S. N. Banerjee Road crossing, Free School Street becomes Hospital Street.

== Intersections ==
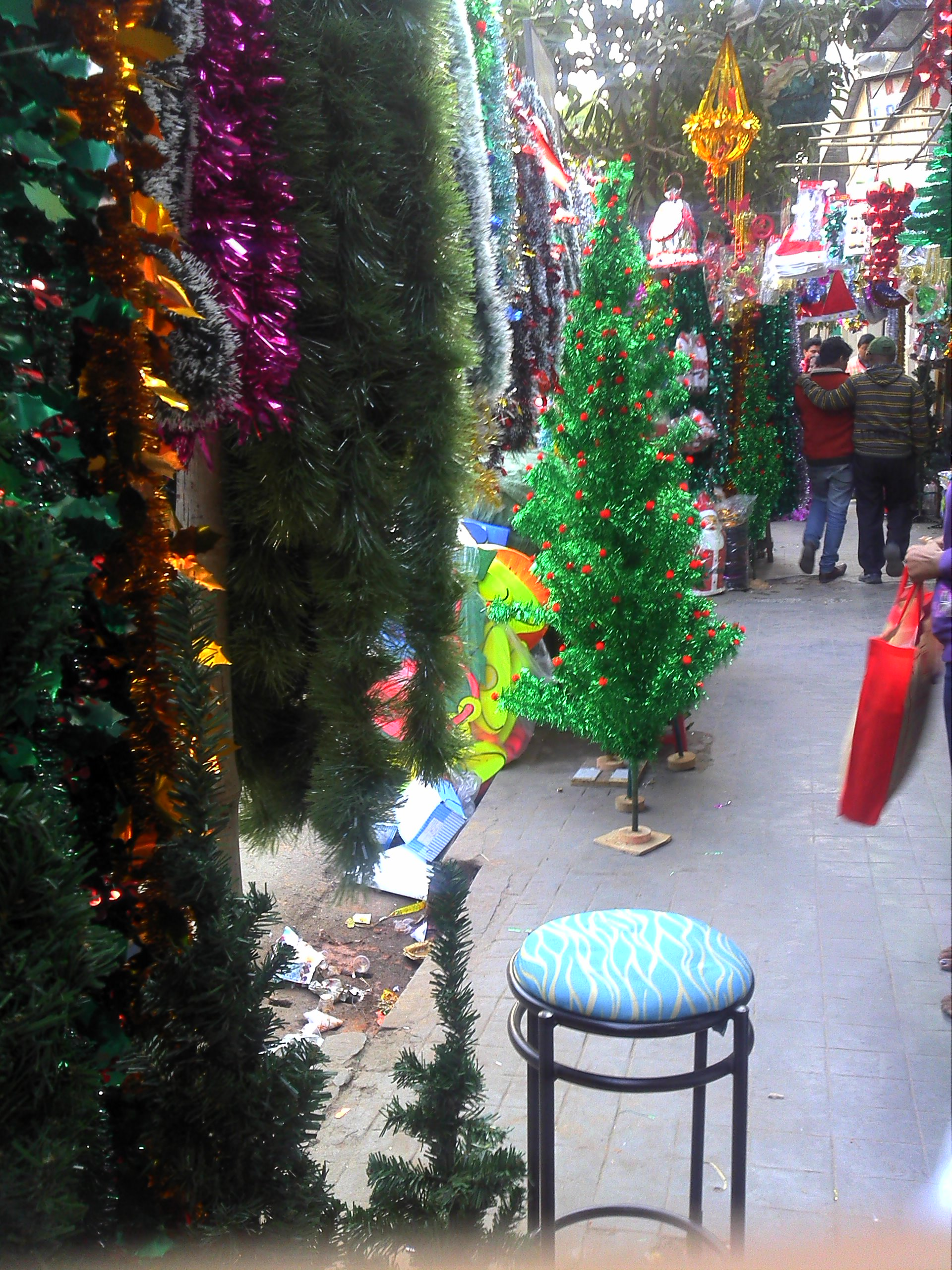
Christmas wares for sale

Lindsay Street and Sudder Street are some of the important streets that cross Free School Street.

== Attractions ==
The Free School Street-Sudder Street area is famous for cheap hotels and eateries. Many foreign visitors reside in these cheap hotels. The used book and record shops sport an eclectic collection due to trade with generations of budget travellers the world over. The street also has the house William Makepeace Thackeray was born in, the West Bengal Fire Services headquarters, Kalman's (a shop of Hungarian origin), Leather Club (a shop for leather goods) etc.

Free School Street dining can be eclectic, with Shamiana - offering cheap Mughlai cuisine, Prince and Princess cheap Bengali cuisine and Mocambo upscale continental dining, to name a few.

== See also ==
- Park Street
- Camac Street
