= Park Street, Kolkata =

Neighbourhood and Road in Kolkata, India

Park Street
- Neighbourhood in Kolkata (Calcutta)
- Talk:Elijah Impey#c-BetacommandBot-2007-11-09T17:54:00.000Z-WikiProject class rating
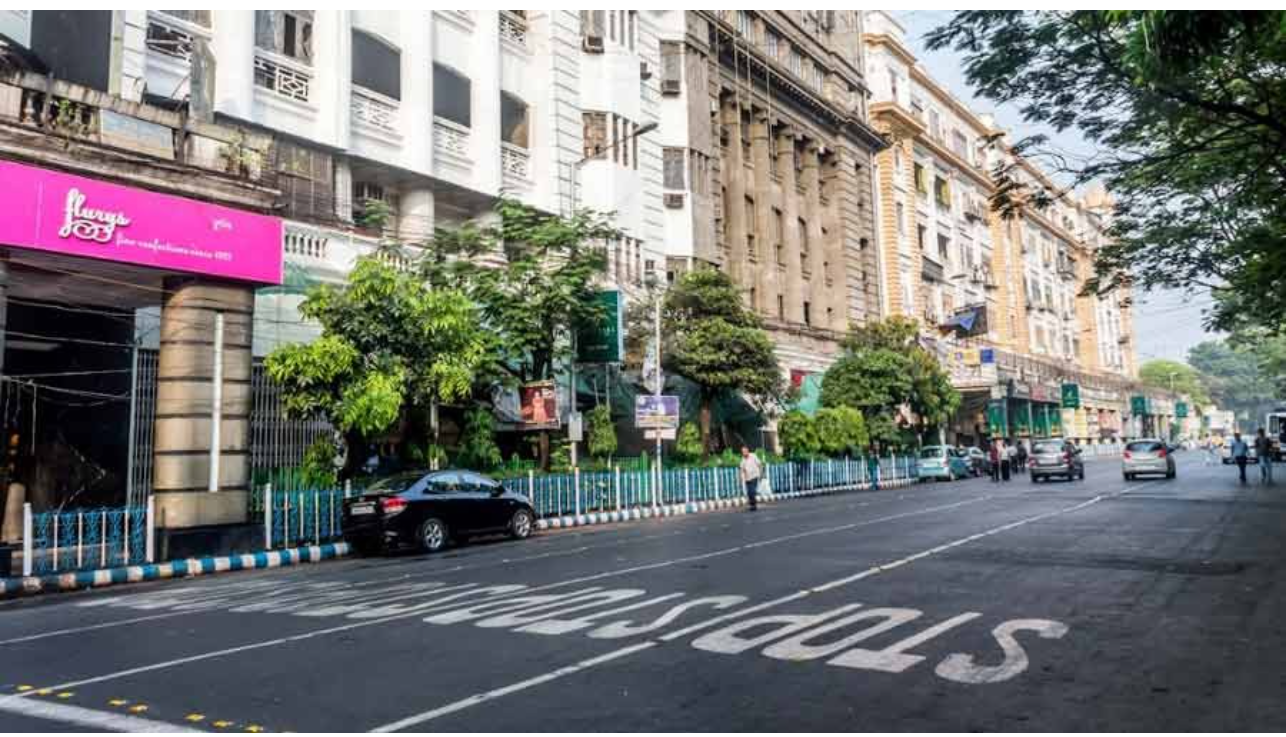
- Park Street near Chowringhee Road crossing
- Country: India
- State: West Bengal
- District: Kolkata
- City: Kolkata
- Metro Station: Park Street
- KMC wards: 61, 63, 64

Government
  - Body: Kolkata Municipal Corporation

Languages
  - Official: Bengali, English
- Time zone: UTC+5:30 (IST)
- PIN: 700016, 700017
- Lok Sabha constituency: Kolkata Dakshin
- Vidhan Sabha constituency: Bhabanipur and Ballygunge
- Planning agency: KMDA
- Civic agency: Kolkata Municipal Corporation
- Website: www.kmcgov.in

Park Street, is a famous thoroughfare in downtown Kolkata, India. It is one of Kolkata's most visited places, famed for numerous celebrations such as on Christmas and New Year's Eve. The street runs through what was a deer park of Sir Elijah Impey, Chief Justice of the Supreme Court in Calcutta from 1773 to 1789.

== History ==
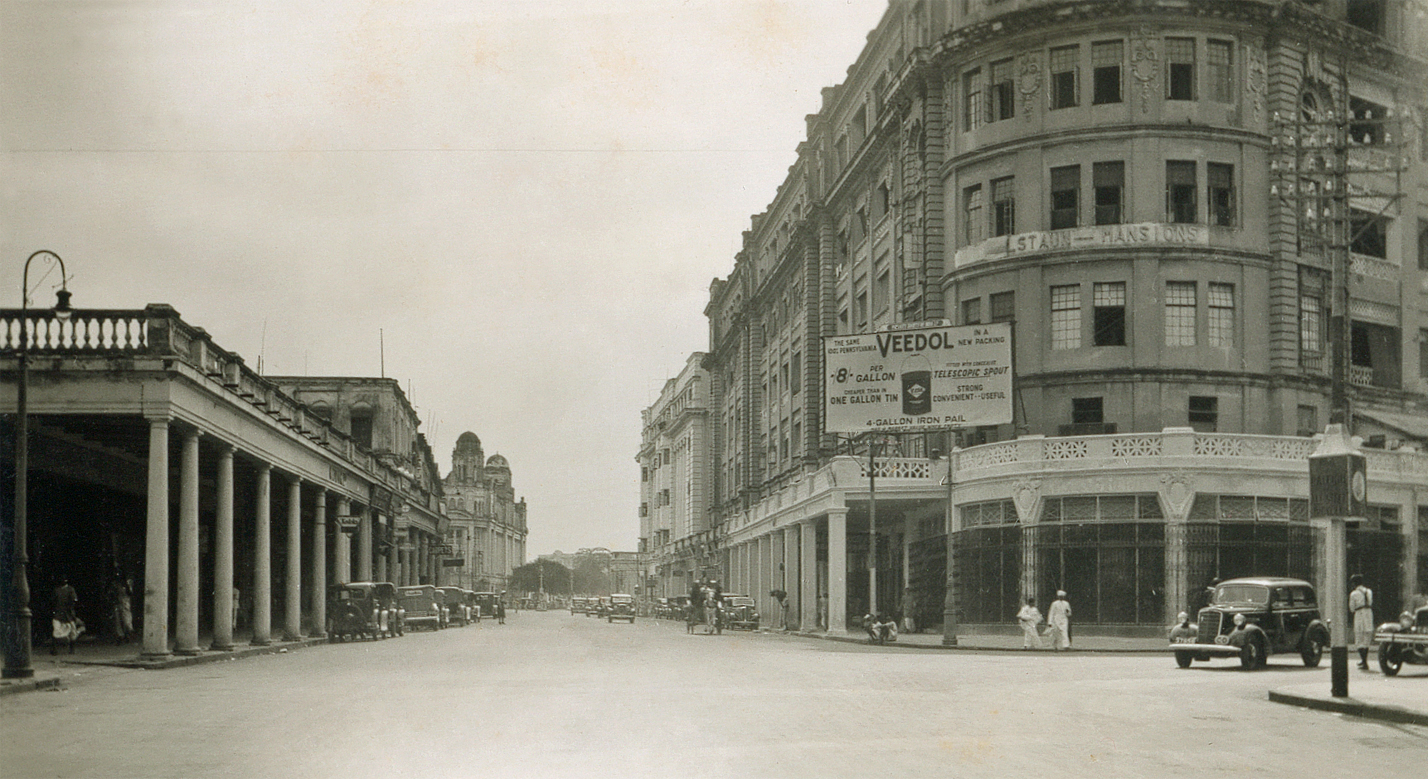
Park Street in the 1930s

Documented records of the throughfare can be traced back to 1760, when Kolkata (then Calcutta) was the capital of the British Empire in India. Since 1760, the street has been through several name changes. Previous names include 'Ghorustan ka Rasta', Vansittart Avenue and Burial Ground Road.

Some 250 years ago, Park Street was known as Burial Ground Road and was not a preferred choice of residence, as there were a number of cemeteries in this area, the South Park Street Cemetery, opposite to it was the North Park Street Cemetery (now replaced by a school). Further west, there were two smaller cemeteries, one French and one Italian (now replaced by offices and schools).

Park Street has been the main evening recreation zone for Kolkata people since the British era. In the 1970s and 1980s much of Kolkata's night life took place in Park Street, with many clubs and restaurants situated there. Many noted musicians had played at various popular night spots, such as Trincas, Peter Cat, Oly Pub, Blue Fox, Mocambo and Moulin Rouge. Even before that, from the 1940s through to the late 1960s, Kolkata's prolific night life was centred on fashionable Park Street. The Park Hotel chain started with the opening of its first hotel, the 150 room The Park Hotel on 1 November 1967. The park street name coinage is assumed to be having association with such a history.

== Location and importance ==
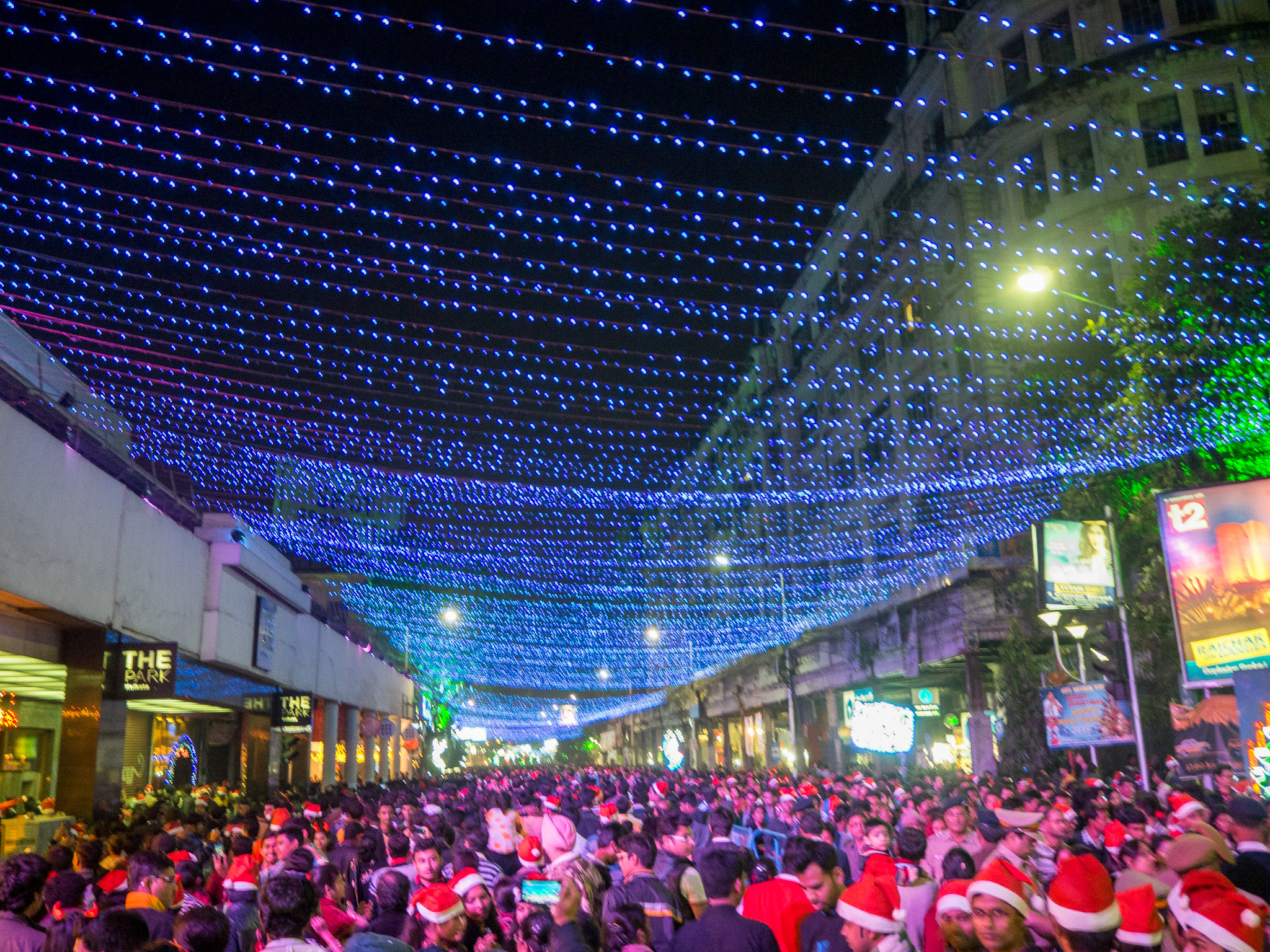
Christmas on Park Street

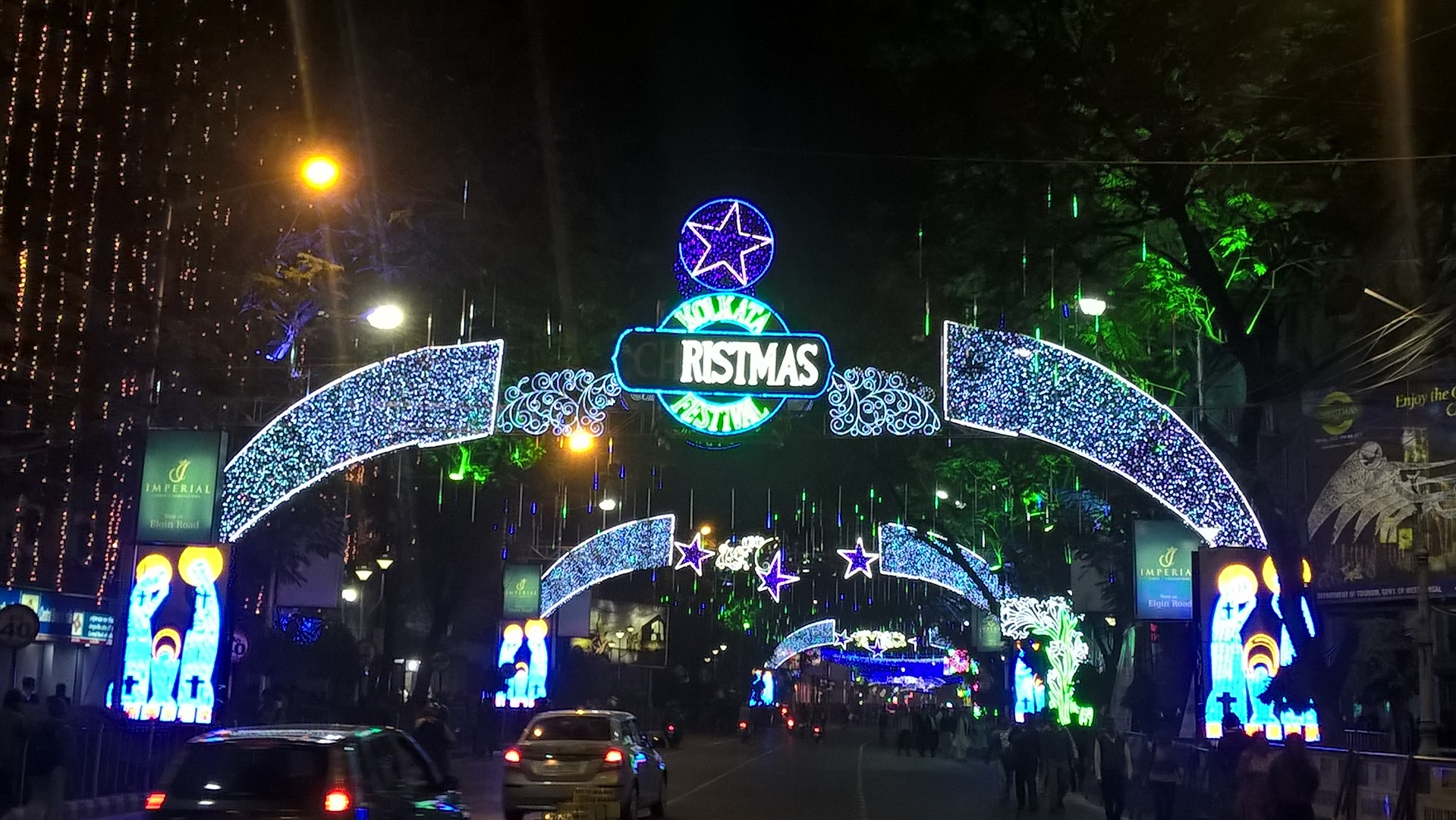
Christmas decorations, 2015

Park Street originates from Chowringhee Road (J L Nehru Road) and connects to Park Circus 7 point crossing in a south eastern direction. The portion of Park Street between Chowringhee Road and Mullick Bazar has been one of the city's attractions for years. Several important roads originate from/intersect at Park Street in the northward and southward directions, namely Russell Street, Middleton Row, Camac Street, Wood Street, Loudon Street and Rawdon Street towards the South and Free School Street, Rafi Ahmed Kidwai Road towards the North. Park Street also intersects AJC Bose Road at Mullick Bazar crossing and eventually goes to Park Circus from where other major roads such as Syed Amir Ali Avenue, Darga Road, Park Circus Connector starts and connects to important areas such as Ballygunge, EM Bypass and CIT Road.

Park Street remains Kolkata's foremost dining district, with many restaurants and pubs. It is often known as "Food Street" and "The Street that Never Sleeps". In the last 15 years, many new restaurants, shopping malls, 5-star hotels and nightclubs have opened in other areas of the city and hence Park Street has lost much of its earlier attraction as being the numero uno entertainment hub of Kolkata. However, it is still one of the prime commercial and entertainment zones of the city. Park Street is traditionally decorated with lights on Diwali, Christmas Day and New Year's Eve.

== Landmarks ==
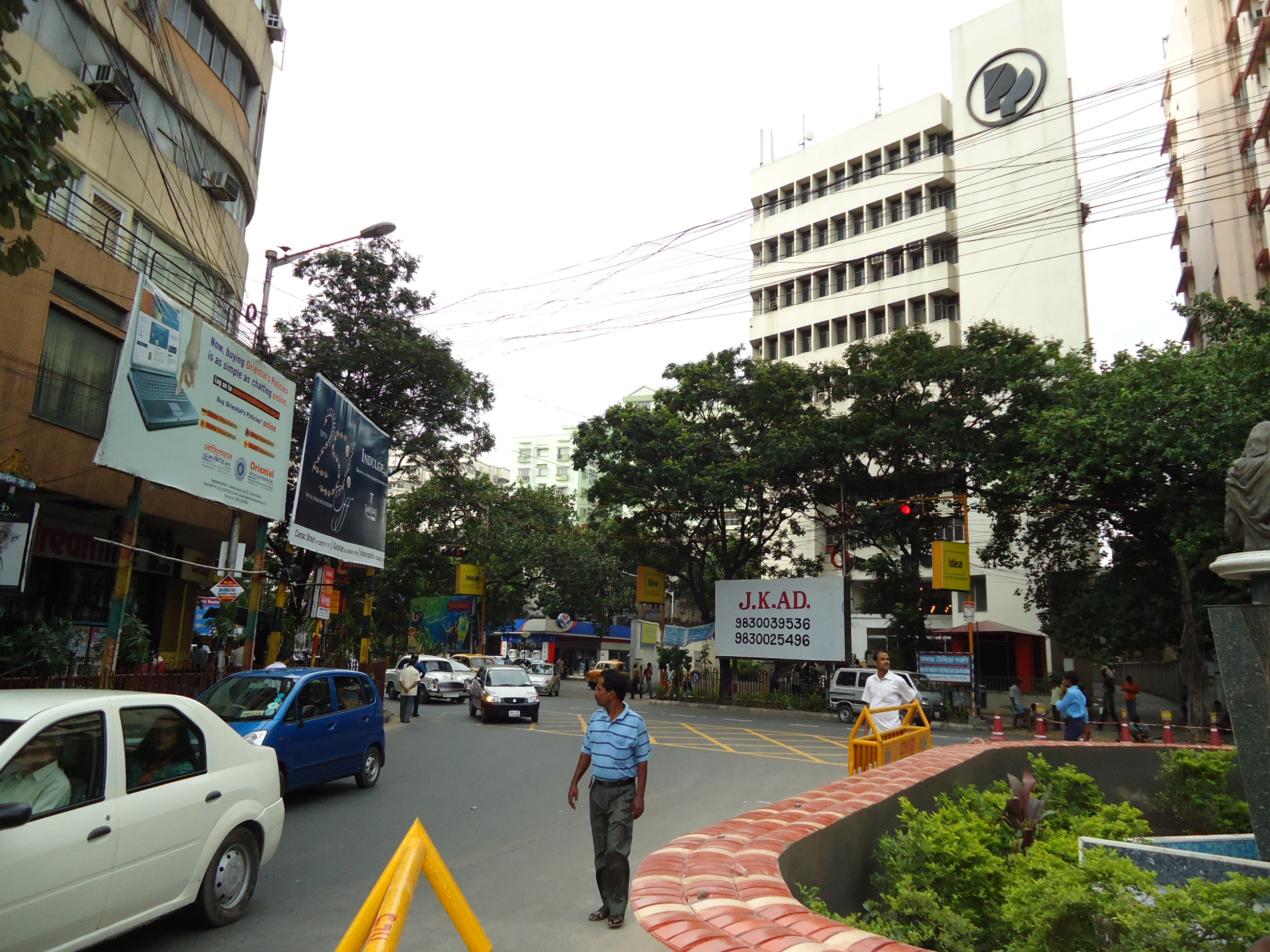
'Park Plaza' office at Park St. - Camac St. crossing

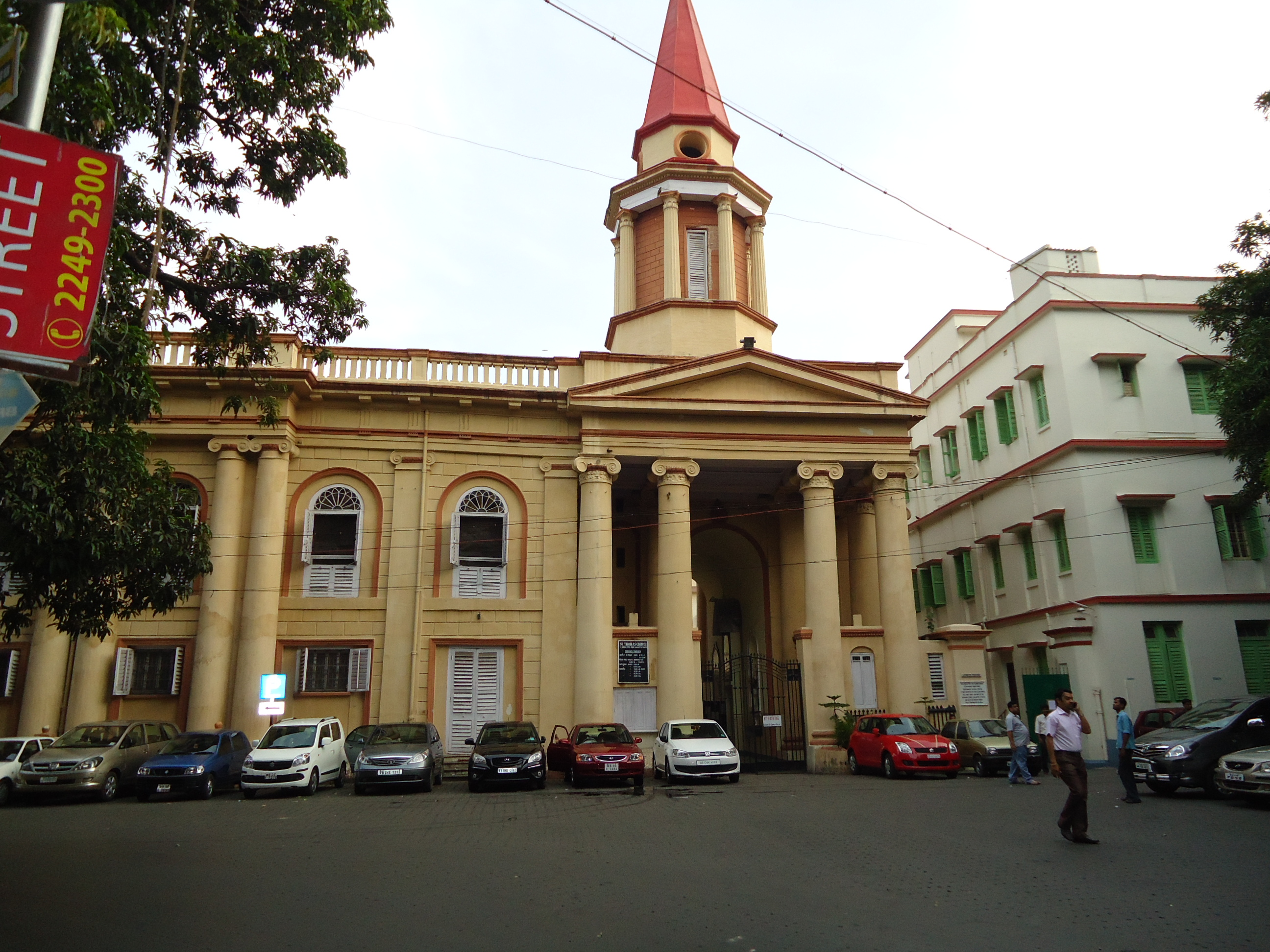
St. Thomas Church, Kolkata

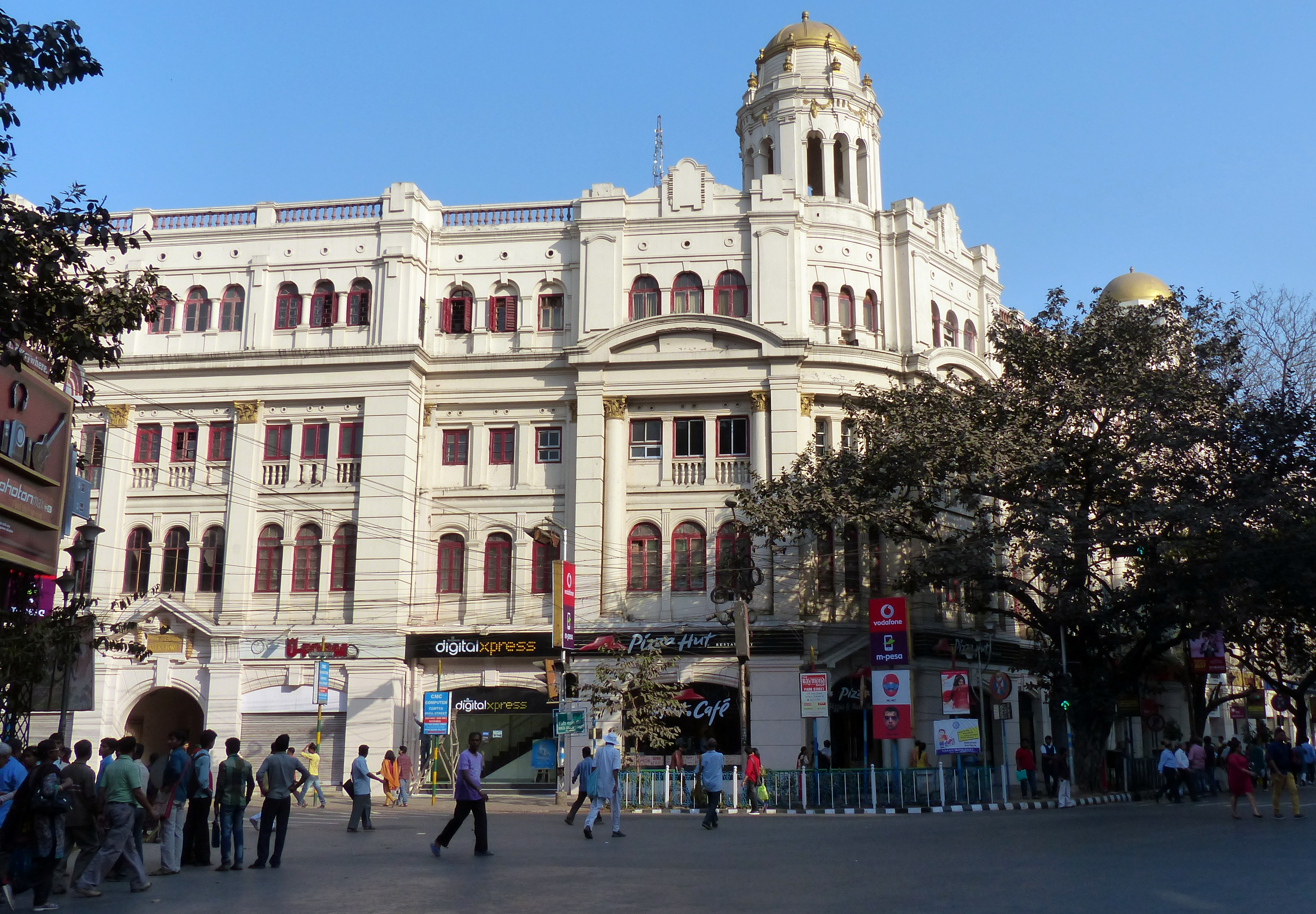
The famous Park Mansion, built by David Ezra on Park street

Park Street has notable landmarks, showrooms, buildings and cenotaphs and tombs of prominent figures from the British Raj era and European population such as:

- Asiatic Society
- St. Xavier's Collegiate School
- St. Xavier's College, Calcutta
- Loreto College, Kolkata
- St. Thomas Church, Kolkata
- Assembly of God Church school
- 'Park Plaza' Office
- Queen's Mansion
- Park Mansions, housing both kolkata Goethe-Institut/Max Mueller Bhavan Kolkata and Alliance Française du Bengale
- The Park Hotel
- South Park Street Cemetery
- Stephen Court Building

== Police district ==
Park Street police station is part of the South division of Kolkata Police. Located at 89, Park Street, Kolkata-700016, it has jurisdiction over the police district which is bordered on the north from the north-west corner of the junction of Dr. Md. Ishaque Road (old Kyd Street), Jawaharlal Nehru Road (old Chowringhee Road) and Janaki Saha Road (old Mayo Road), thence crossing Jawaharlal Nehru Road to the north-east corner of the junction of Dr. Md. Ishaque Road (old Kyd Street) and Jawaharlal Nehru Road, thence eastward by the northern limits of Dr. Md. Ishaque Road up to Mirza Galib Street (old Free School Street) and thence northward along the western limits of Mirza Galib Street up to the north-west corner of the junction of Mustaque Ahmed Lane (old Marquis Street) and Mirza Galib Street, thence crossing Mirza Galib Street, to the north-east corner of the junction of Mustaque Ahmed Lane and Mirza Galib Street, thence eastward by the northern limits of Mustaque Ahmed Lane to Rafi Ahmed Kidwai Road (old Wellesly Street), thence crossing Rafi Ahmed Kidwai to the north-east corner of the junction of Mustaque Ahmed Lane and Rafi Ahmed Kidwai Road, thence eastward by the northern limits of Haji Md. Mohsin Road and Alimuddin Street respectively to Acharya Jagadish Chandra Bose Road thence crossing Acharya Jagadish Chandra Bose Road up to the north-east corner of the junction of Alimuddin Street and Acharya Jagadish Chandra Bose Road.

It is bordered on the east from the north-east corner of the junction of Alimuddin Street and the Acharya Jagadish Chandra Bose Road, thence by southward the eastern boundary of Acharya Jagadish Chandra Bose Road up to the south-east corner of the junction of Park Street and Acharya Jagadish Chandra Bose Road.

It is bordered in south from the south-east corner of the junction of Park Street and Acharya Jagadish Chandra Bose Road (old Lower Circular Road) then crossing Acharya Jagadish Chandra Bose Road to the south west corner of the junction of Park Street and Acharya Jagadish Chandra Bose Road, then westward by the southern limits of Park Street to Jawaharlal Nehru Road (old Chowringhee Road) thence crossing Jawaharlal Nehru Road up to the south-west corner of the junction of Park Street, Outram Road and Jawaharlal Nehru Road.

It is bordered on the west From the south-west corner of the junction of Park Street, Jawaharlal Nehru Road (old Chowringhee Road) and Outram Road, thence northward by the western limits of the Jawaharlal Nehru Road up to the north-west corner of the junction of Dr. Md. Ishaque Road (old Kyd Street), Jawaharlal Nehru Road and Janaki Saha Road (old Mayo Road).

See also - Park Street police district map

Tollygunge Women's police station has jurisdiction over all the police districts in the South Division, i.e. Park Street, Shakespeare Sarani, Alipore, Hastings, Maidan, Bhowanipore, Kalighat, Tollygunge, Charu Market, New Alipur and Chetla.park Street police station

== See also ==
- Camac Street
- Sudder Street
- Chowringhee
- AJC Bose Road & APC Road
- Free School Street
