= Sudder Street =

Road in Kolkata, India

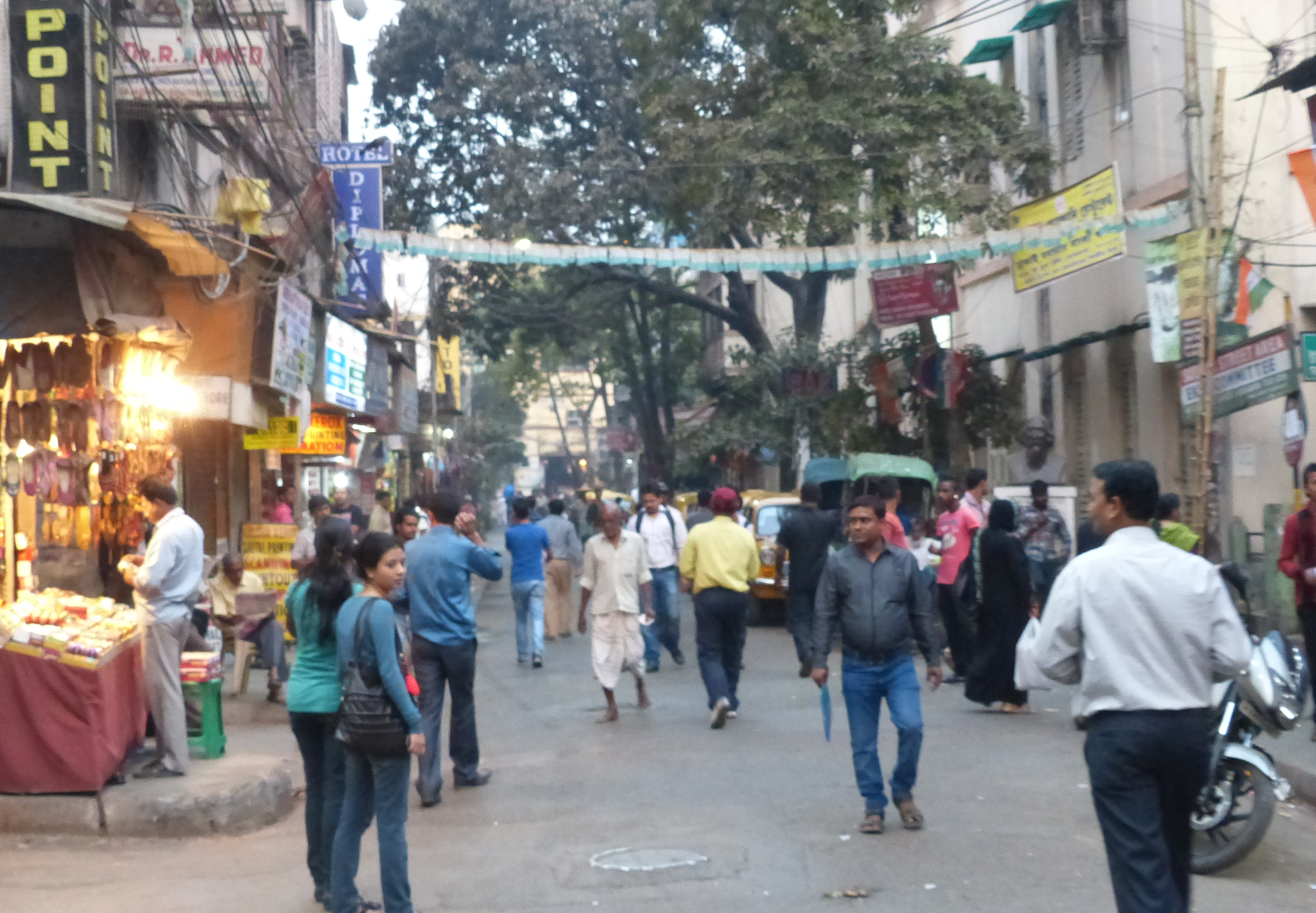
- Maintained by: Kolkata Municipal Corporation
- Location: Kolkata, India
- Postal code: 700016
- Nearest Kolkata Metro station: Esplanade, Park Street
- Coordinates: 22.5583°N 88.3526°E
- east end: Free School Street
- west end: Chowringhee

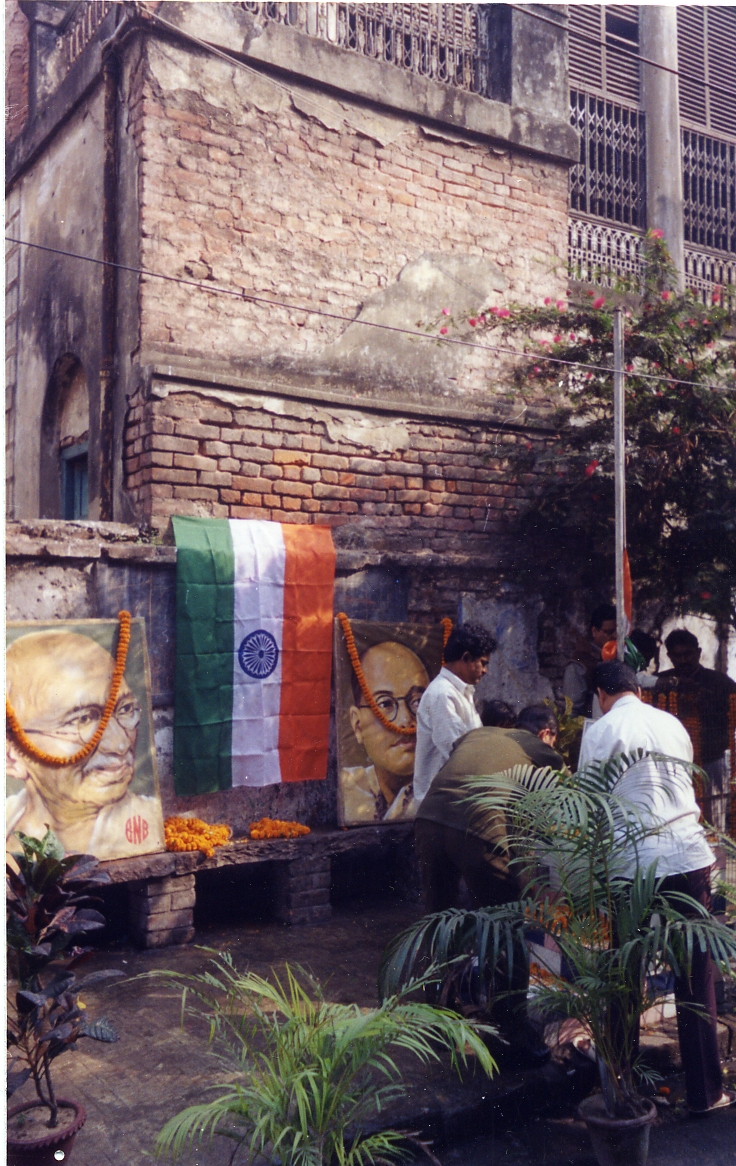
Republic Day celebrations on Sudder Street

Sudder Street is a street in Central Kolkata and famous for cheap hotels. Foreign tourists often prefer the living places in this street during their stay in Kolkata.

== Localities ==
There are a number of cheap eateries, foreign currency exchange kiosks and travel agencies in Sudder street. The area around Sudder Street is notorious for drug peddlers, who supply contraband drugs at cheap rates.

== Landmarks ==
The street starts exactly opposite the Fire Brigade Headquarters on Free School Street and ends towards the entrance of Indian Museum on Chowringhee Road. The famous Elgin Fairlawn hotel is situated on Sudder Street. There is also a building on the turning of Hartford Lane off Sudder Street where Nobel Laureate Rabindranath Tagore lived for a while and penned a few poems.

== History and nostalgia ==
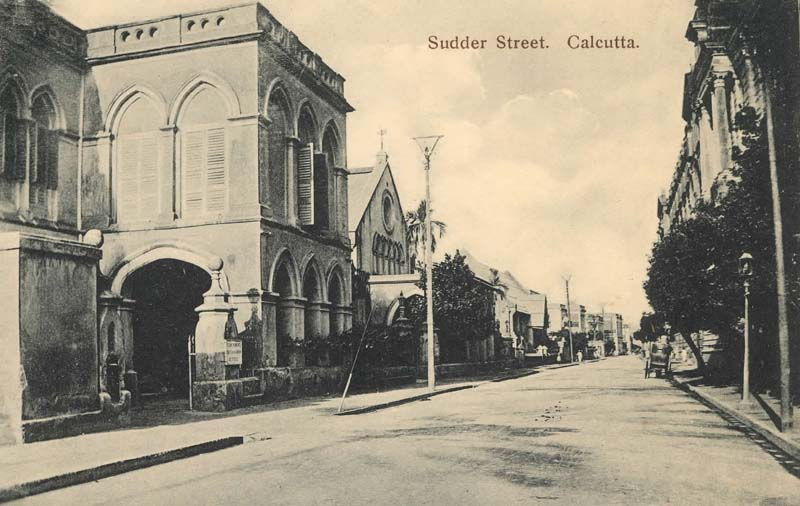
Sudder Street in the late 19th or early 20th century

Famous poet Rabindranath Tagore's elder brother Jyotirindranath Tagore and his wife Kadambari Devi lived at 10 Sudder Street. It is well known how Rabindranath came to write his profoundly moving long poem "Nirjharer Swapnabhanga" in a fit of sudden illumination that had all the qualities of an epiphany. in the morning at Sudder Street, Rabindranath had a joyful feeling. His sorrows had been totally removed by the morning sun rays coming from all the directions. In his excitement he created Nirjharer Swapnabhagna. "Aji e probhate robir kar ...". which was incorporated in Prabhat Sangeet. Sometime in 1881-82 Rabindranath lodged with his brother Jyotirindranath and Kadambari at 10 Sudder Street, Kolkata, just behind Indian Museum. Here, as he later recalled in Jibansmriti (My Reminiscences): "One morning I happened to be standing on the verandah looking that way. The sun was just rising through the leafy tops of the trees. As I gazed, all of a sudden a lid seemed to fall from my eyes and I found the world bathed in a wonderful radiance, with waves of beauty and joy swelling on every side. .... That very day the poem 'Nirjharer Swapnabhanga' (The Awakening of the Waterfall)".
