= Gurusaday Dutt Road =

Road in Kolkata, India

Gurusaday Dutt Road (or Gurusaday Road) is one of the areas of Kolkata. Its old name was Ballygunge Store Road. It was named after Gurusaday Dutt, an ICS officer and a Bengali patriot.

== Localities ==
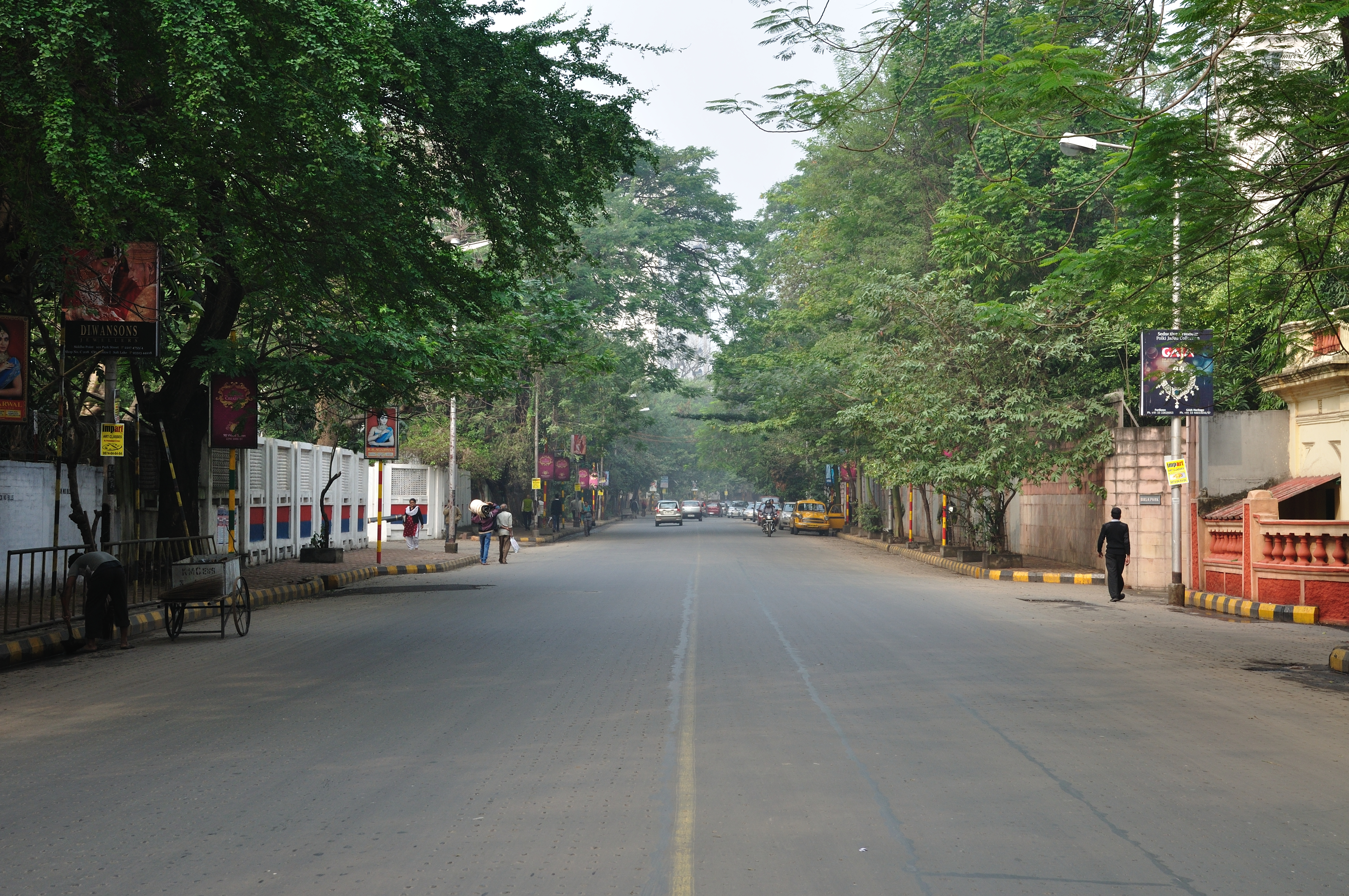
Gurusaday Dutta Road, Kolkata

Gurusaday Dutt Road falls under the upscale locality of Ballygunge in South Kolkata. The Tagore family owned substantial property in the area. Satyendra Nath Tagore, ICS, house on Gurusaday Dutt Road was later bought by the Birlas, and the house has now become The Birla Industrial & Technological Museum. Others like Sir K G Gupta ICS, Gurusaday Dutt ICS (founder of the Bratachari Movement – after whom the road was later named) also lived on Gurusaday Dutt Road. Birla Industrial and Technological Museum, on Gurusaday Dutt Road, was inaugurated in 1959 as the first popular science museum in Asia. Modelled on the Deutsches Museum, it has interactive popular science exhibits and a significant collection of historical industrial holdings in India. Its collection of old gramophones, sound recorders, telephones, steam engines, road rollers and other industrial machinery of the period 1880–1950 is very significant. The museum sports a vintage model of the Rolls-Royce Phantom make. It also actively organizes summer camps, awareness programs and astronomy observations for school children.

The Calcutta Cricket and Football Club (originally the Calcutta Cricket Club) is the second oldest cricket club in the world, after the Marylebone Cricket Club. Founded in 1792 as the Calcutta Cricket Club, it merged later with the Calcutta Football Club (founded 1872) to become the Calcutta Cricket and Football Club, and is located on 19/1 Gurusaday Dutt Road. It has arguably the most picturesque cricket ground in Kolkata. Recent evidence in the form of an article in Hicky's Bengal Gazette, suggests the club existed in 1780 – which would make it the oldest cricket club in the world.

It also has a set of fine restaurants, perhaps the most notable of them is one of Kolkata's well-known Chinese restaurant, Mainland China. Also nearby are Birla Temple and Gandhara Art Gallery. The Indo-German Chamber of Commerce is based at Uniworth House.

== Landmarks ==
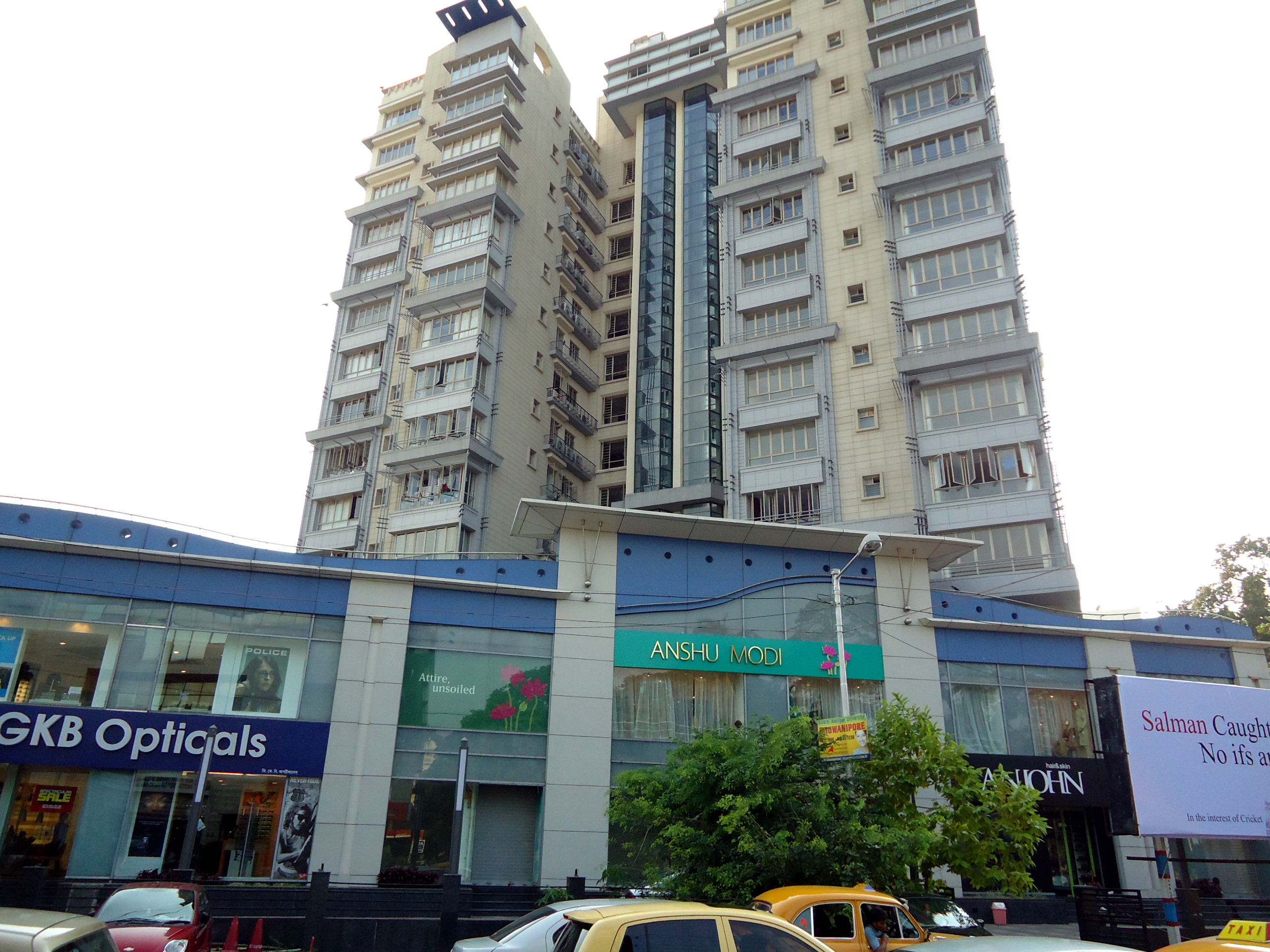
Astral Apts & Atria Shopping Plaza

1. Birla Industrial & Technological Museum
2. Calcutta Cricket and Football Club
3. Birla Park (residential estate of The Birlas)
4. 'The Empire' Complex
5. Tagore Hall
6. Kusum Apartments
7. Uniworth House (houses Mainland China restaurant)
8. Astral Apartments & Atria Shopping Plaza
9. Isckon House
