= Shyampukur =

- Neighbourhood in Kolkata (Calcutta)
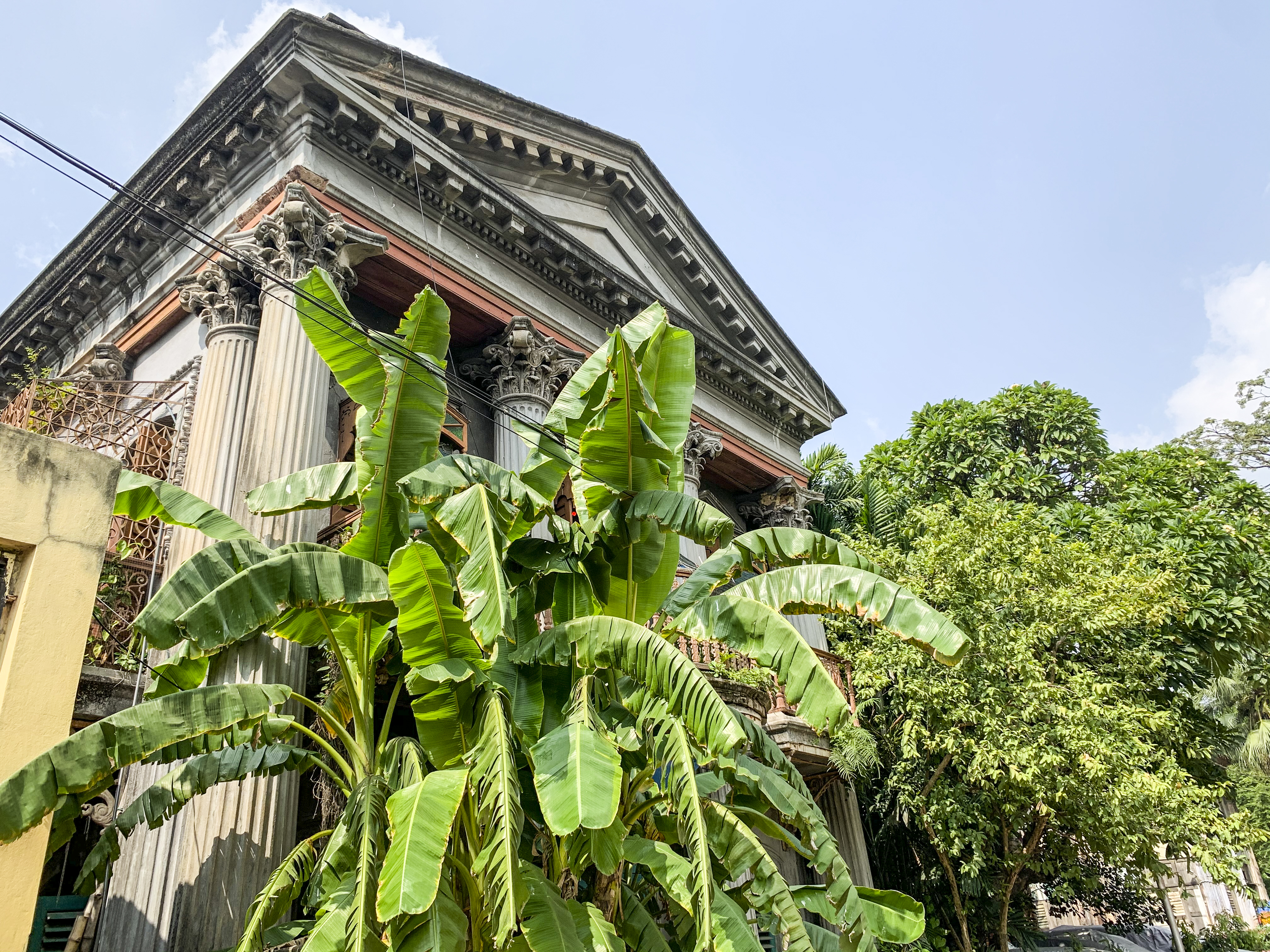
- House of Mitra family, Shyampukur

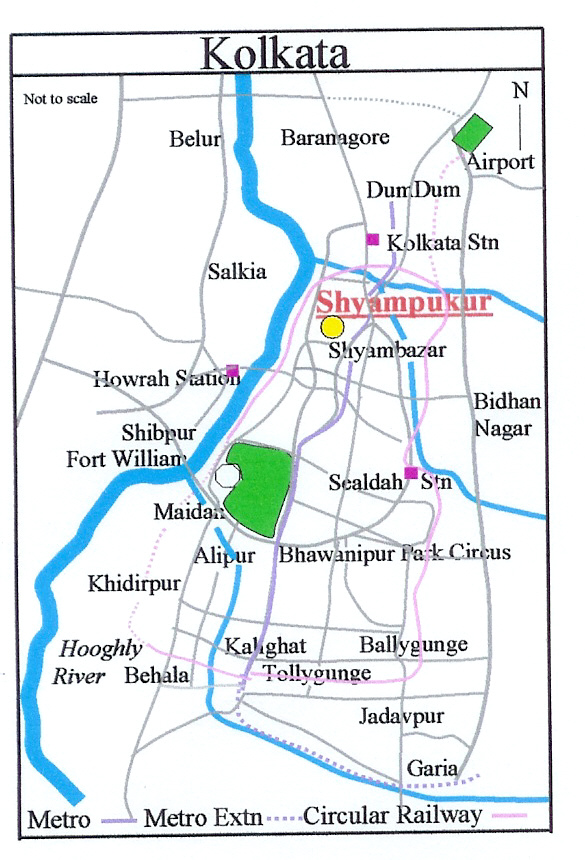
- Coordinates: 22.5997°N 88.3683°E
- Country: India
- State: West Bengal
- City: Kolkata
- District: Kolkata
- Metro Station: Shyambazar and Sobhabazar Sutanuti
- Municipal Corporation: Kolkata Municipal Corporation
- KMC ward: 10
- Elevation: 36 ft (11 m)

Population
  - Total: For population see linked KMC ward pages
- Time zone: UTC+5:30 (IST)
- PIN: 700004
- Area code: +91 33
- Lok Sabha constituency: Kolkata Uttar
- Vidhan Sabha constituency: Shyampukur

Shyampukur is a neighbourhood of North Kolkata, in Kolkata district in the Indian state of West Bengal. As a neighbourhood, it covers a small area but its importance is primarily because of the police station.

== Etymology ==
Shyampukur, like its neighbour Shyambazar, is likely to have been named in honour of Shyam Rai (or Gobinda), the attendant of the goddess Kali, the household deity of the Basaks(বসাক), who with the Setts(শেঠ) were amongst the first to have settled in Sutanuti, after having cleared the jungles.

== History ==
Shyampukur is in the heart of what was Sutanuti. It was one of police stations mentioned in the earliest list of police stations of Kolkata prepared in 1785. After the Battle of Plassey, in 1757, the British settled down to more organised administration in Kolkata. One of the developments was the police station, which also provided civic facilities. The Police Commissioner doubled as Municipal Chairman till 1888. Shyampukur was one of the twenty-five police section houses in 1888. Shyampukur was overtaken in importance by Shyambazar and Baghbazar, the area being the citadel of Bengali aristocracy.

== Geography ==
=== Police district ===
Shyampukur police station is part of the North and North Suburban division of Kolkata Police. It is located at 47, Shyampukur Street, Kolkata-700004.

Amherst Street Women police station covers all police districts under the jurisdiction of the North and North Suburban division i.e. Amherst Street, Jorabagan, Shyampukur, Cossipore, Chitpur, Sinthi, Burtolla and Tala.

Shyampukur police district of Kolkata Police is spread over Shyambazar, Bagbazar and Kumortuli and a part of Shobhabazar. Bagbazar ghat, Promoda Sundari ghat, Kashi Mitra ghat, Kumortuli ghat and Shovabazar ghat on the Hooghly River are within the jurisdiction of Shyampukur police district.

== Early landmarks ==
In 1891, Mohun Bagan shifted its ground from Phariapukur to Shyampukur as a result of the benevolence of the Maharaja of Shyampukur, Durga Charan Laha. Later, the club's ground was moved to Shyam Square.

When Jamshedji Framji Madan entered the ‘bioscope’ scene in 1902, he began to screen films in tents set up on the Maidan and in Shyampukur.

The barowari Durga Puja organised at Shyampukur in 1911 was the second in Kolkata.

=== Ramakrishna connection ===
In 1885, Ramakrishna Paramhansa stayed at 55 Shyampukur Street, known as Shyampukur Bati, for several days after leaving Dakshineswar for treatment of throat cancer. He stayed there before moving to Cossipore Udyanbati. The house has now been converted into a museum displaying articles used by him during his stay there and some paintings. Among other objects on display are parts of the camera with which the first picture of Ramakrishna was taken.

== Transport ==
=== Road ===
Shyampukur is surrounded by Jatindra Mohan Avenue, Bhupendra Bose Avenue, Aurobindo Sarani and Bidhan Sarani. Many buses ply along these roads.

=== Train ===
Kolkata Station, which is one of the five major railway-terminals of Kolkata Metropolitan Area, is located nearby.
