= Hatibagan =

- Neighbourhood in Kolkata (Calcutta)
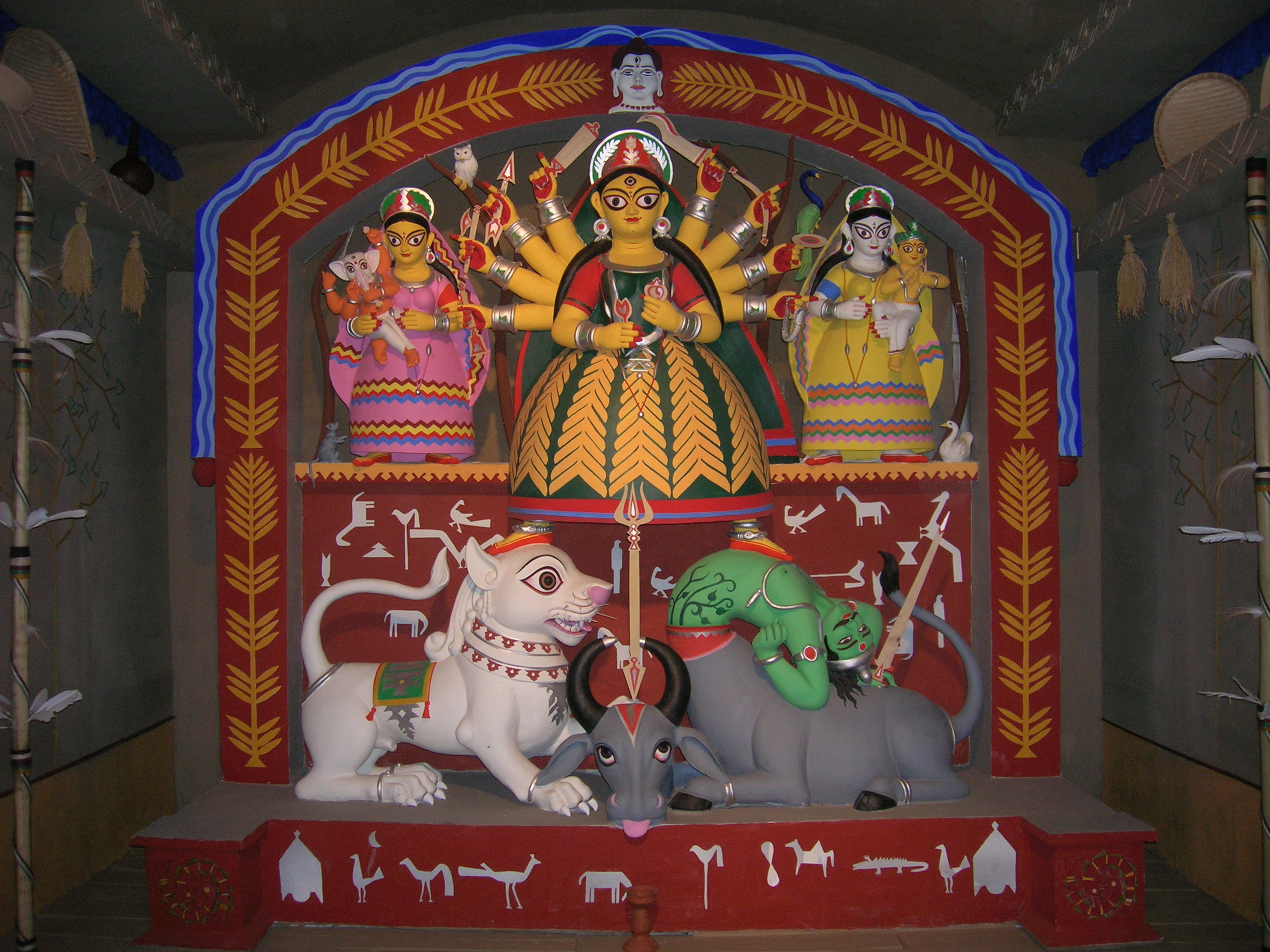
- An unusual artistic depiction of goddess Durga at Hatibagan Nabin Palli Sarbojanin

- Location in Kolkata
- Coordinates: 22°35′51″N 88°22′13″E
- Country: India
- State: West Bengal
- City: Kolkata
- District: Kolkata
- Metro Station: Shobhabazar Sutanuti and Shyambazar
- Municipal Corporation: Kolkata Municipal Corporation
- KMC wards: 10, 11

Population
  - Total: For population see linked KMC ward page
- Time zone: UTC+5:30 (IST)
- PIN: 700 004
- Area code: +91 33
- Lok Sabha constituency: Kolkata Uttar
- Vidhan Sabha constituency: Maniktala

Hatibagan is a popular neighbourhood of North Kolkata in Kolkata district in the Indian state of West Bengal.

== Overview ==
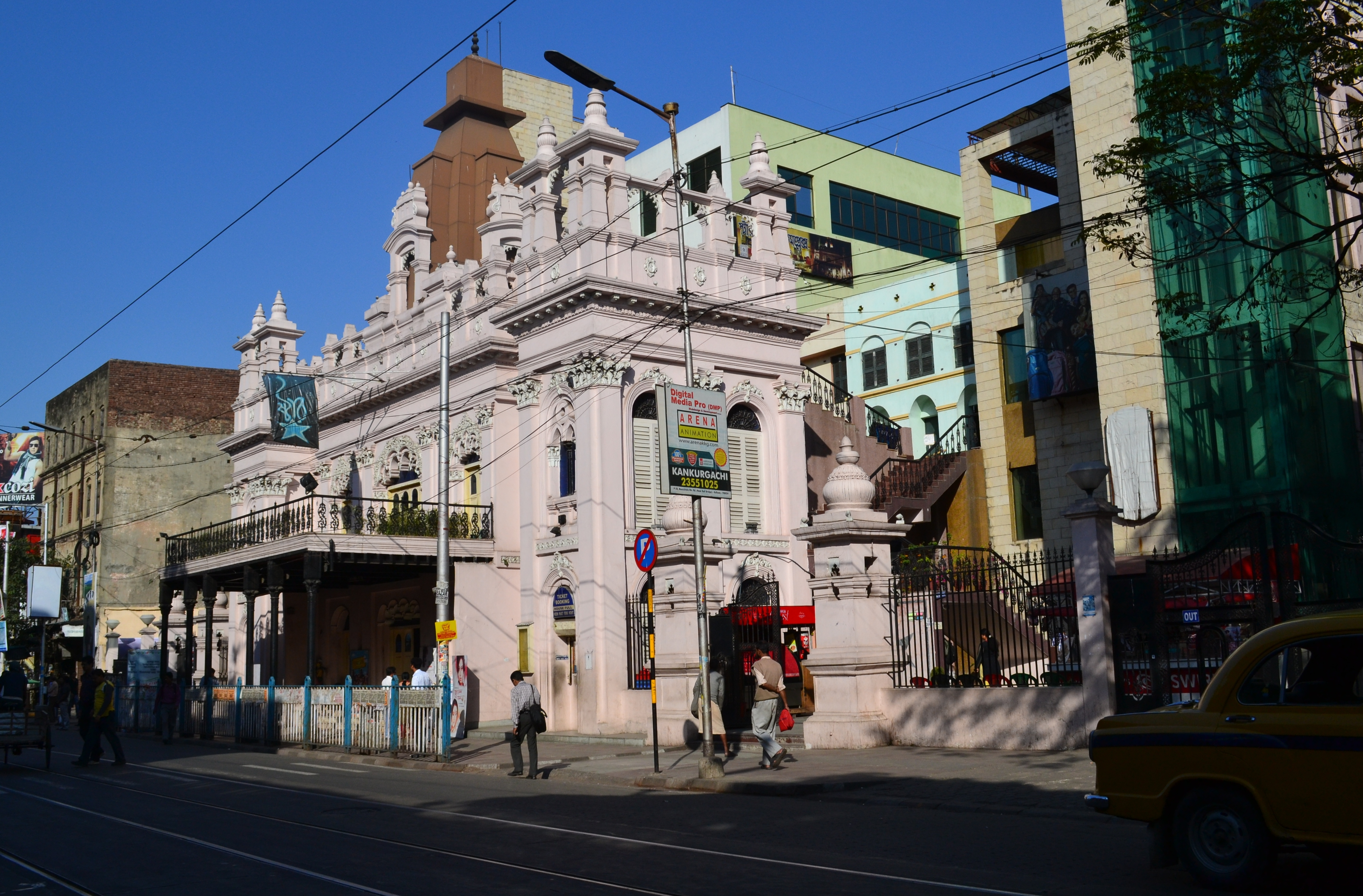
Star Theatre, Kolkata

The area is under Shyampukur and Burtolla police stations. It is next to Shyambazar. The place is popular for its shops, markets, cinema halls and old theatres. No other places in Kolkata cover as many cinema & theatre halls as Hatibagan. One of the most popular and famous cinema halls here is the Star Theatre, with many people in North Kolkata choosing to watch films there instead of multiplexes because of its low ticket prices. Hatibagan is one of the oldest traditional markets in Kolkata city. One can buy typical Bengal silk and cotton saris here. Hatibagan broadly covers Ward No. 10 and 11 of Kolkata Municipal Corporation.

This locality is also renowned for having some of the best Durga Puja committees in the city.Hatibagan Sarbojanin and Hatibagan Nabin Pally being the most notable ones.

The Japanese had dropped a bomb at Hatibagan market during World War II but it did not explode. The major portion of the market was gutted in a fire on 22 March 2012.

== Etymology ==
There are two main views on the etymology of the name Hatibagan. Hati means elephant, bagan means garden. According to one view, the elephants of the Nawab Siraj ud-Daulah were posted here when he attacked Kolkata in 1756. Another view suggests someone with the surname Hati had a villa with garden in this area, leading to the name. The villa was bought by Mehtab Chand Mullick who initiated the market.

== Economy ==
=== Daily markets ===
Hatibagan market, along with Maniktala, Sealdah, Lake Market and Gariahat markets, is amongst the largest markets in Kolkata. The larger markets of Kolkata have two sectors – inner and outer. The inner market is the official or core market in a planned building and the outer is a makeshift arrangement of pavement stalls. Hatibagan Market at 82, Bidhan Sarani is a private market spread across 1 acre. Vegetables, fruits, betel leaf, fish, meat, egg, spices etc. are available. It is a hustle-bustle area spread beyond the market arena onto the footpaths. "From fashionable wears to home decors and goods, you will get each and everything that you need." Earlier, Hatibagan had a pet market, which has been shifted to Galiff Street. A fire had gutted Hatibagan Market in 2012. The market houses more than 1,500 shops in two buildings.

== Transport ==
=== Road ===
Two major roads those cross through Hatibagan are Bidhan Sarani (formerly Cornwallis Street) & Aurobindo Sarani (formerly Grey Street).

Several buses ply on Bidhan Sarani via Hatibagan are:

- 219 Nagerbazar - Howrah Stn
- 240 Baghbazar - Golf Green
- 234/1 Belgharia - Golf Green
- 34B Dunlop - Esplanade
- S-158 Mini Dakshineswar - Babughat
- 78/1 Rahara Bazar - Babughat

Bus route numbers 211, 211B, 215A, S-175 (Mini), RT-25 (Mini), RT-29 (Mini) ply on Grey Street via Hatibagan.

=== Train ===
Kolkata Station, one of the five major railway-terminals of Kolkata Metropolitan Area, is the nearest railway station. Bidhannagar Road railway station and Sovabazar Ahiritola railway station are also located nearby.
