= Bidhan Sarani =

Road in Kolkata, India

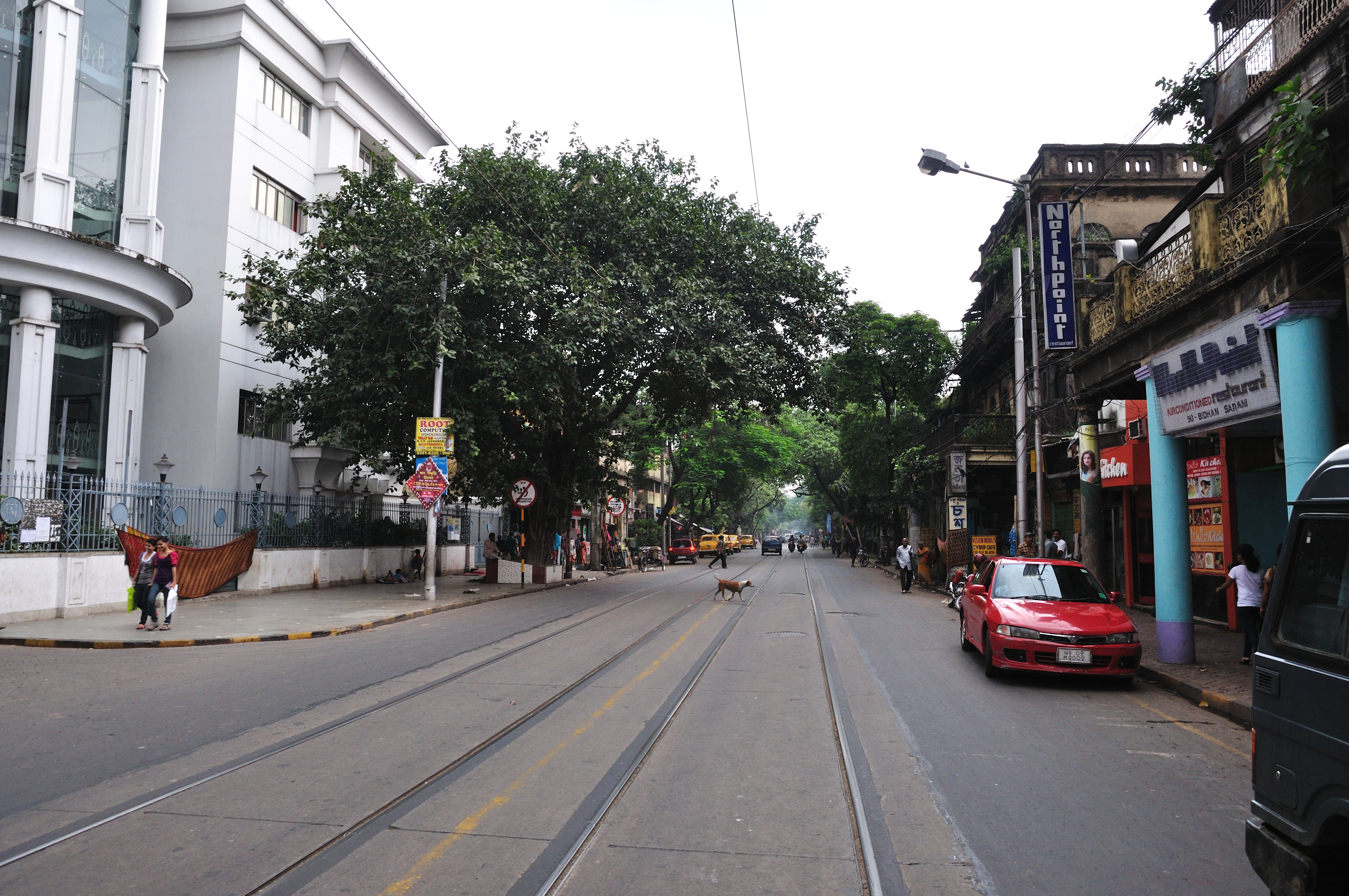
- Former name(s): Cornwallis Street
- Maintained by: Kolkata Municipal Corporation
- Location: Kolkata, India
- Postal code: 700004, 700006, 700007, 700073
- Nearest Kolkata Metro station: MG Road; Girish Park; Shobhabazar Sutanuti; Shyambazar
- north end: Shyambazar
- south end: Barna Parichay Market

Bidhan Sarani (formerly known as Cornwallis Street) is a principal north–south thoroughfare in North Kolkata. It was named after the first Chief Minister of West Bengal, Bidhan Chandra Roy. The road starts from Shyambazar five-point crossing and extends up to MG Road crossing (Barna Parichay Market), after which the street continues as College Street towards the south. Bidhan Sarani encompasses the neighbourhoods of Shyambazar, Hatibagan and College Street.

== History ==
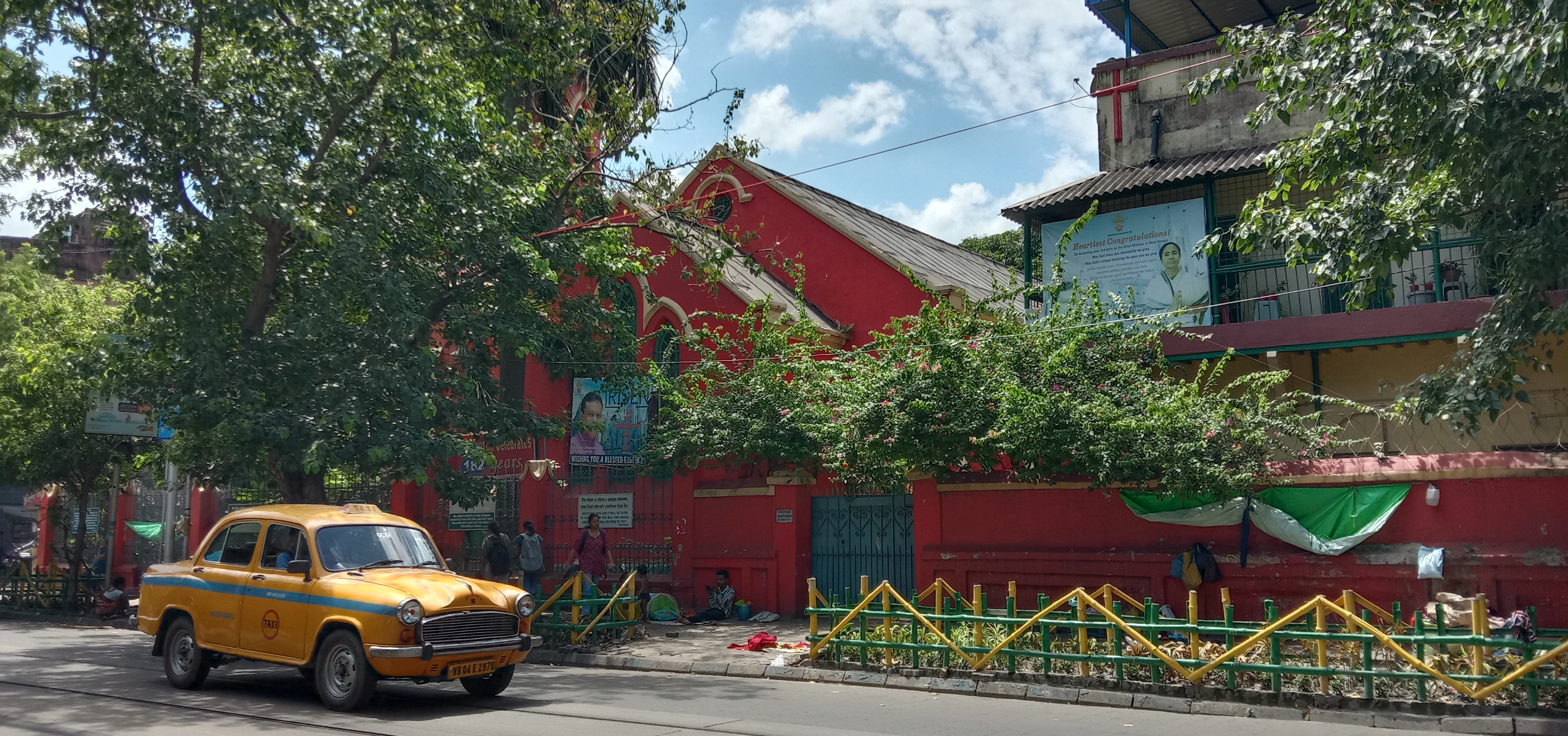
Christ Church at Bidhan Sarani, Manicktala, Hedua, Machuabazar, established in 1839 by Bishop Wilson.

The three-mile long Maratha Ditch was excavated in 1742 as a protection against the marauding Maratha soldiers then foraging in the countryside but who never came. It was filled up in 1799 to build the Circular Road, that ran from Shyambazar, right around old Kolkata, covering the southern end of the Maidan. It was metalled in the early 19th century. Around the same time, the most important axial thoroughfare from south to north — Wood Street (portion renamed Dr. Martin Luther King Sarani), Wellesley Street (renamed Rafi Ahmed Kidwai Street), Wellington Street (renamed Nirmal Chandra Street), College Street and Cornwallis Street (renamed Bidhan Sarani) — was built by the Lottery Committee.

The Hatibagan Bazar is located on Bidhan Sarani. The street market continues till Aurobindo Sarani crossing and has resulted in congestion of the area.

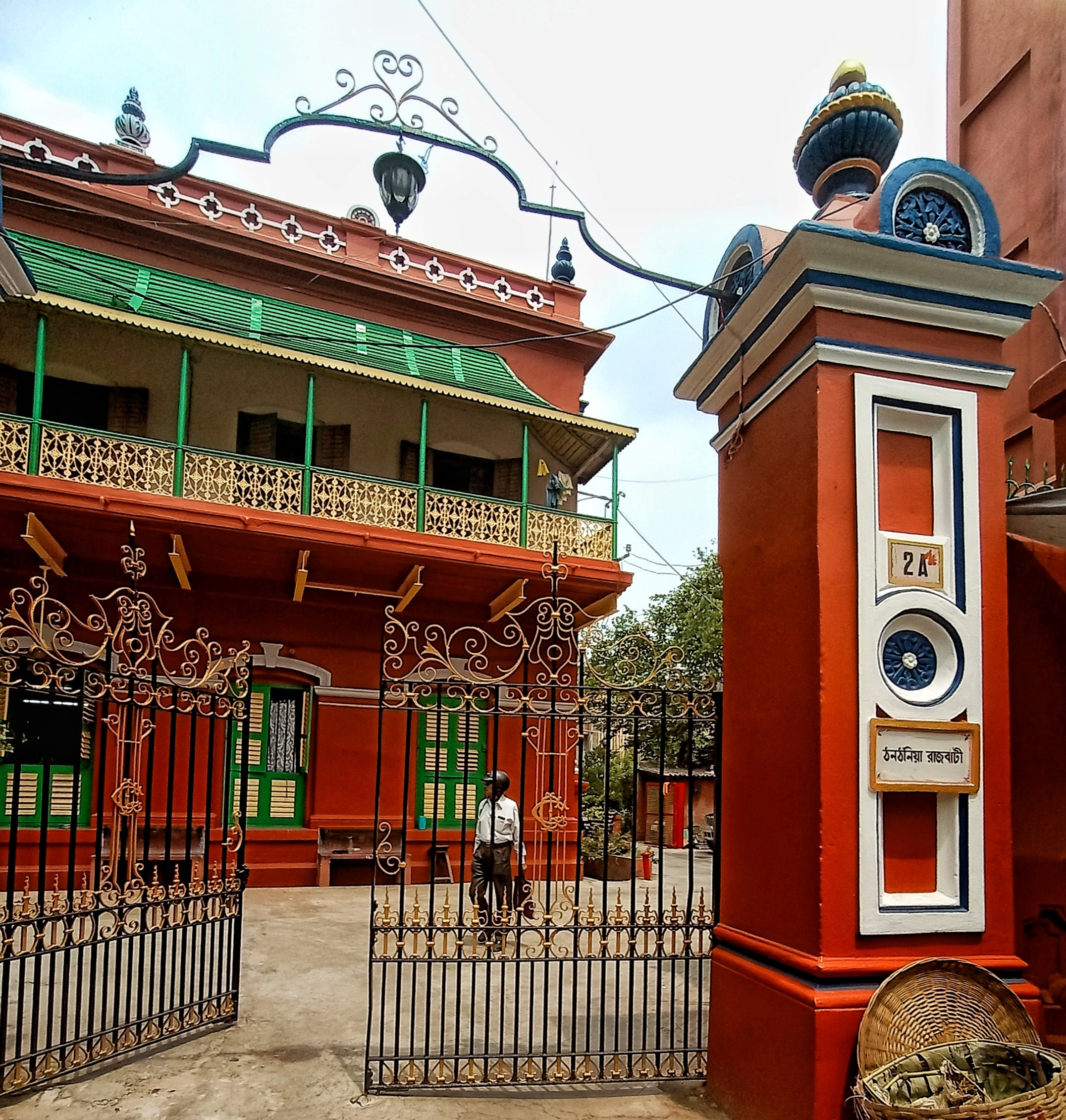
Thanthania Rajbati (colonial era palace) on Bidhan Sarani, near College Street.

The Star Theatre located on Bidhan Sarani was famous for over 100 years and during the period nearly 250 Bengali dramas of more than 80 playwrights were performed by different producers. More than 12 Hindi dramas were also staged at the Theatre. Unfortunately a fire destroyed the glorious Star Theatre on 16 October 1991. It has again been built but it has failed to regain its old glory. With six cinema halls — Sree, Uttara, Radha, Rupbani, Bina, Minar, Mitra and Darpana — in a row along Bidhan Sarani the road was considered to be the entertainment hub in the city.

The Bethune College, is situated on Bidhan Sarani near Hedua. The street is also famous for sweetmeat shops like Girish Chandra Dey & Nakur Chandra Nandy.

The Vidyasagar College, a reputed institution is also situated on Bidhan Sarani near Thanthania Kalibari.

== Gallery ==
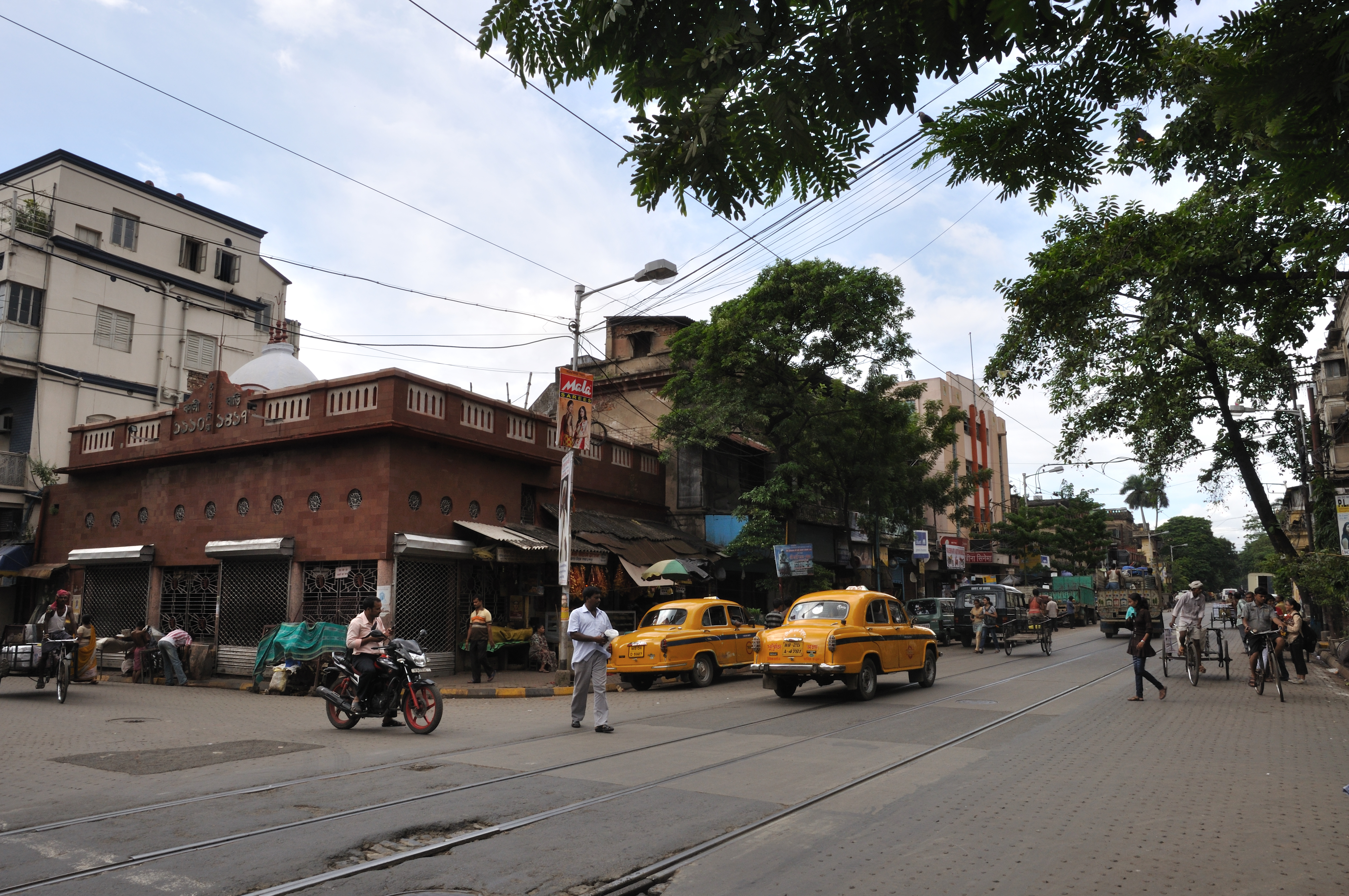
Thanthania Kalibari

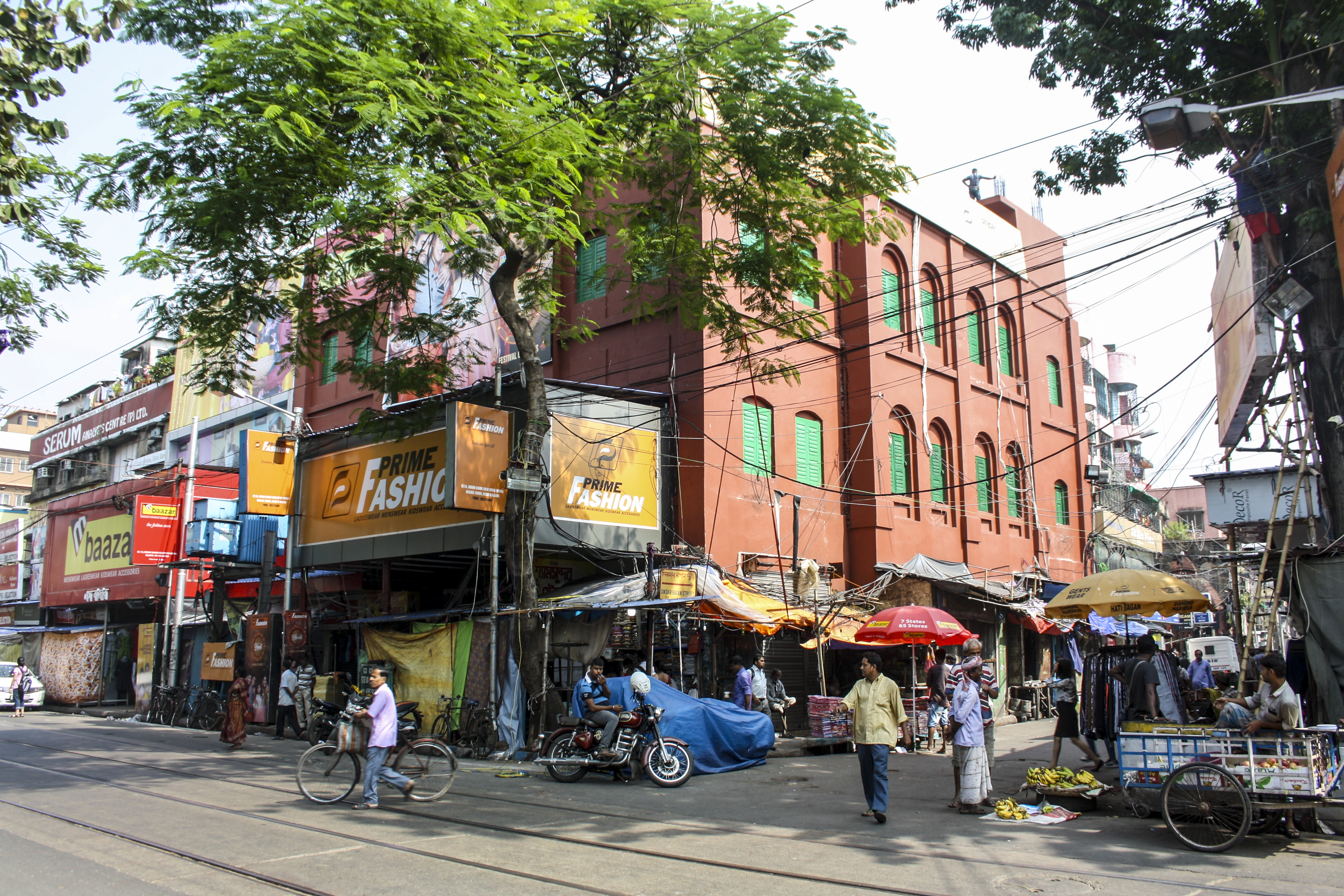
House Associated with Upendranath Brahmachari

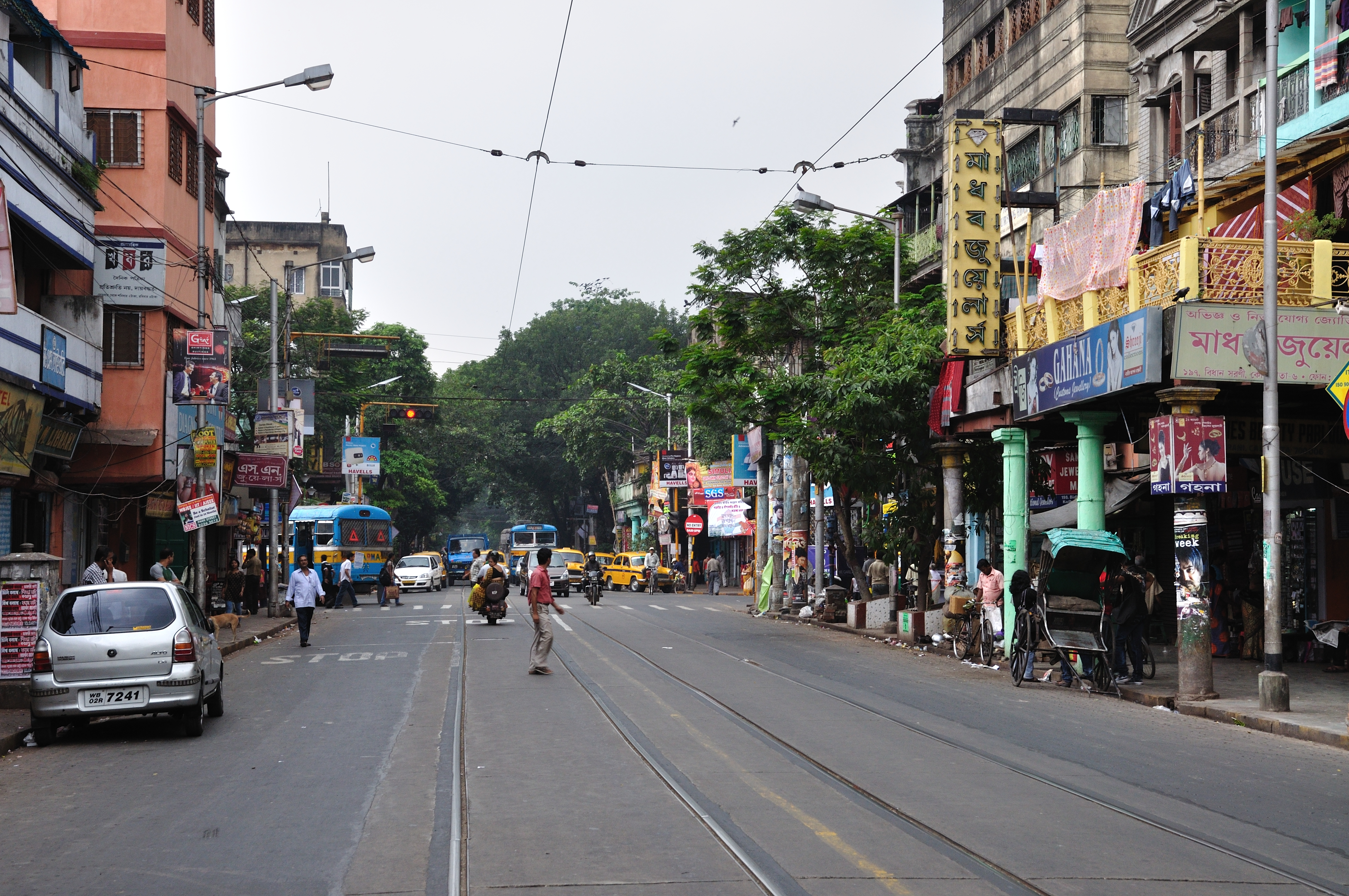
Busy Crossing of Vivekananda Road with Bidhan Sarani

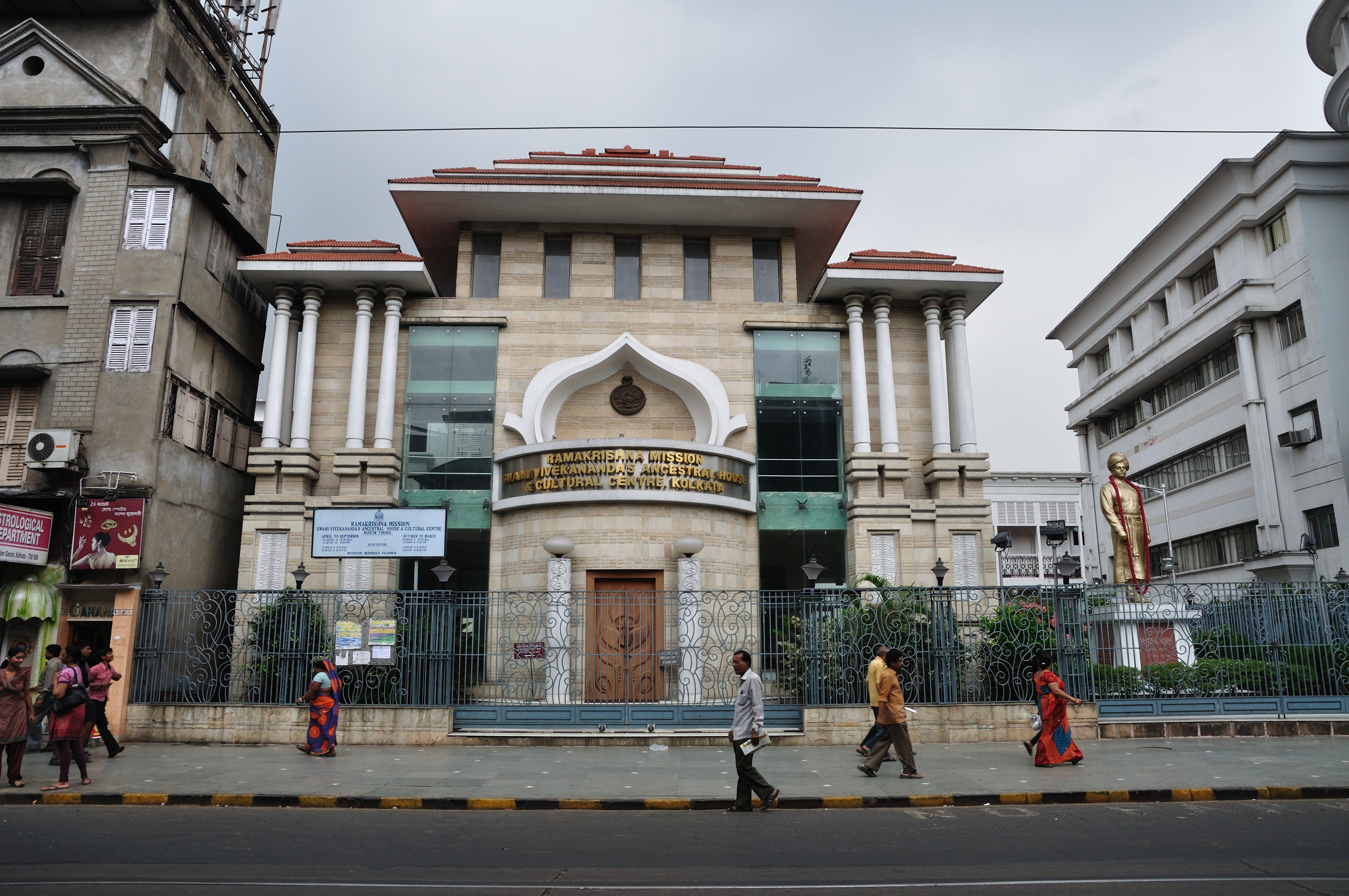
Swami Vivekananda's Ancestral House & Cultural Centre, Simla

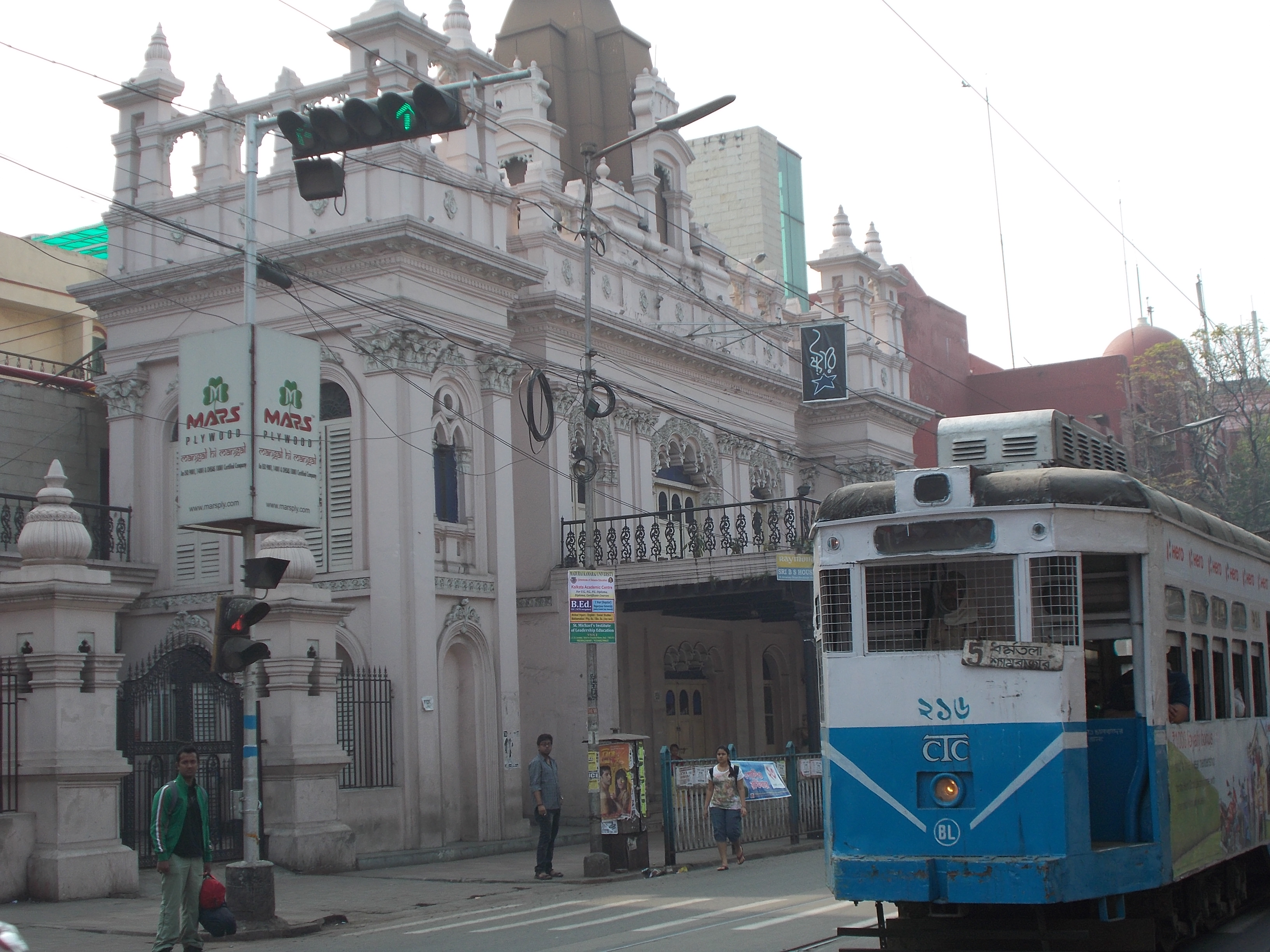
Kolkata Tram route no. 5 passing by Star Theatre, Hatibagan

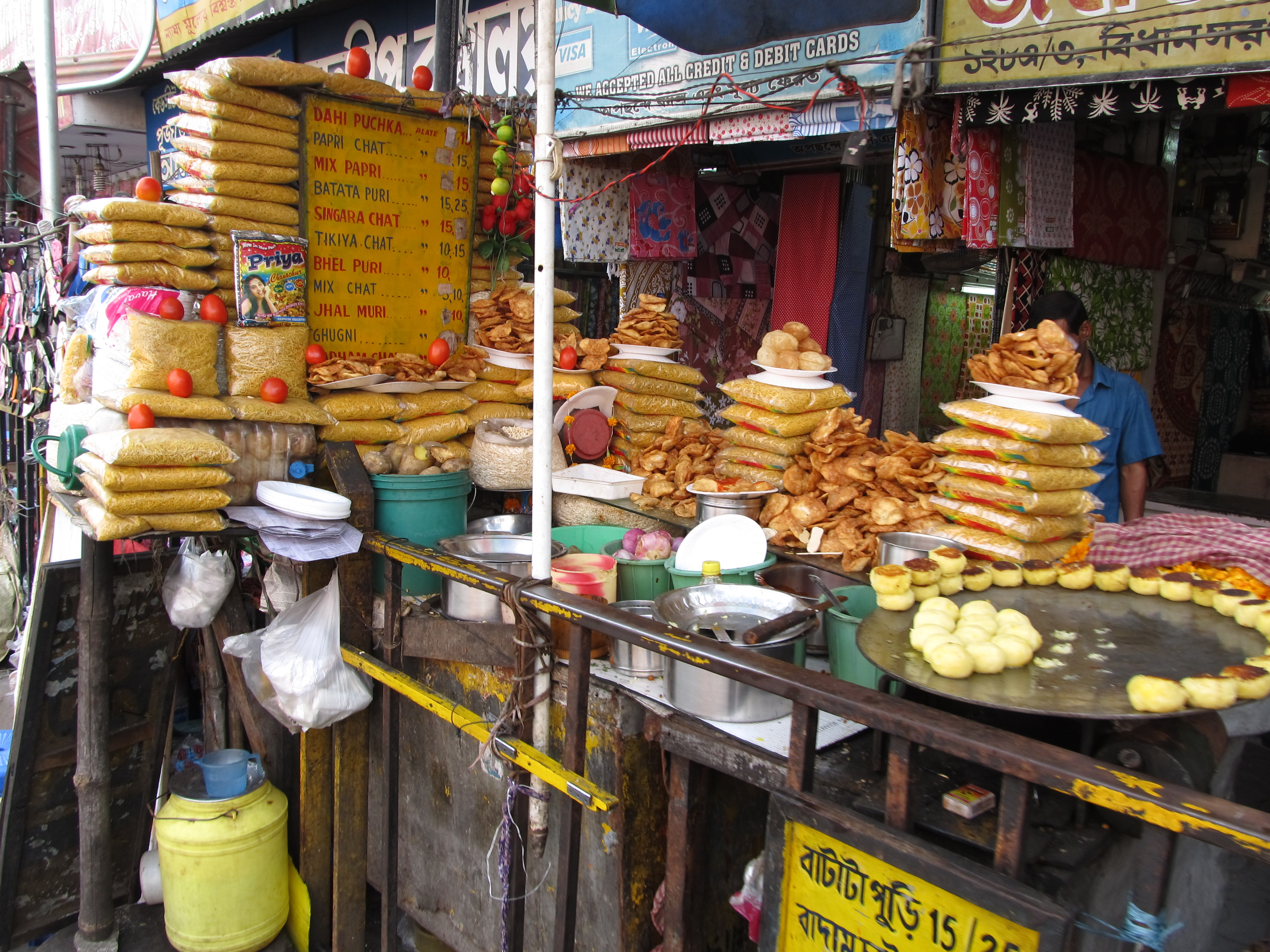
Roadside snacks stall on Bidhan Sarani

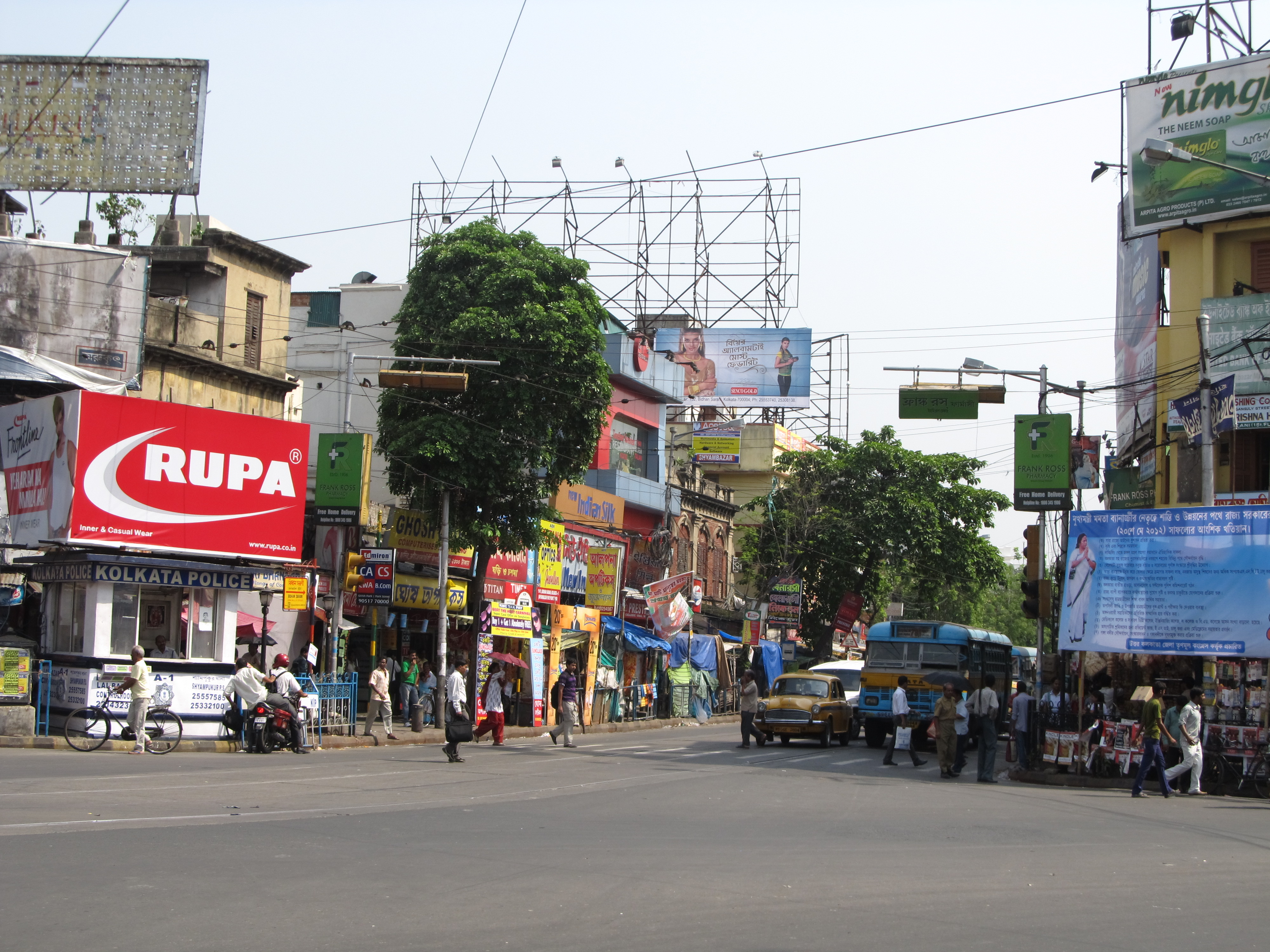
Bidhan Sarani at Shyambazar Five-point crossing

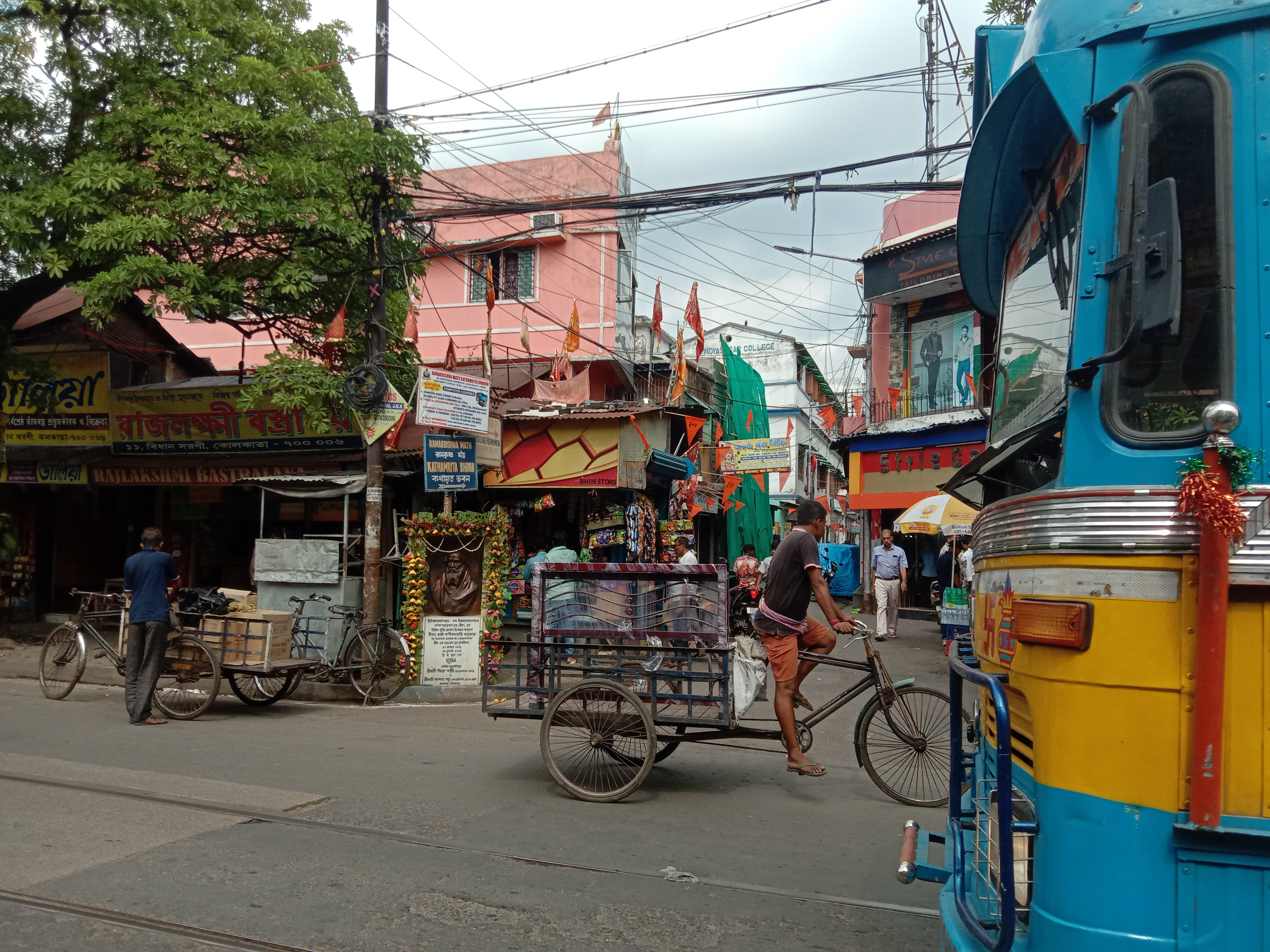
Vidyasagar College in Bidhan Sarani
