= Star Theatre, Kolkata =

Binodini Theatre
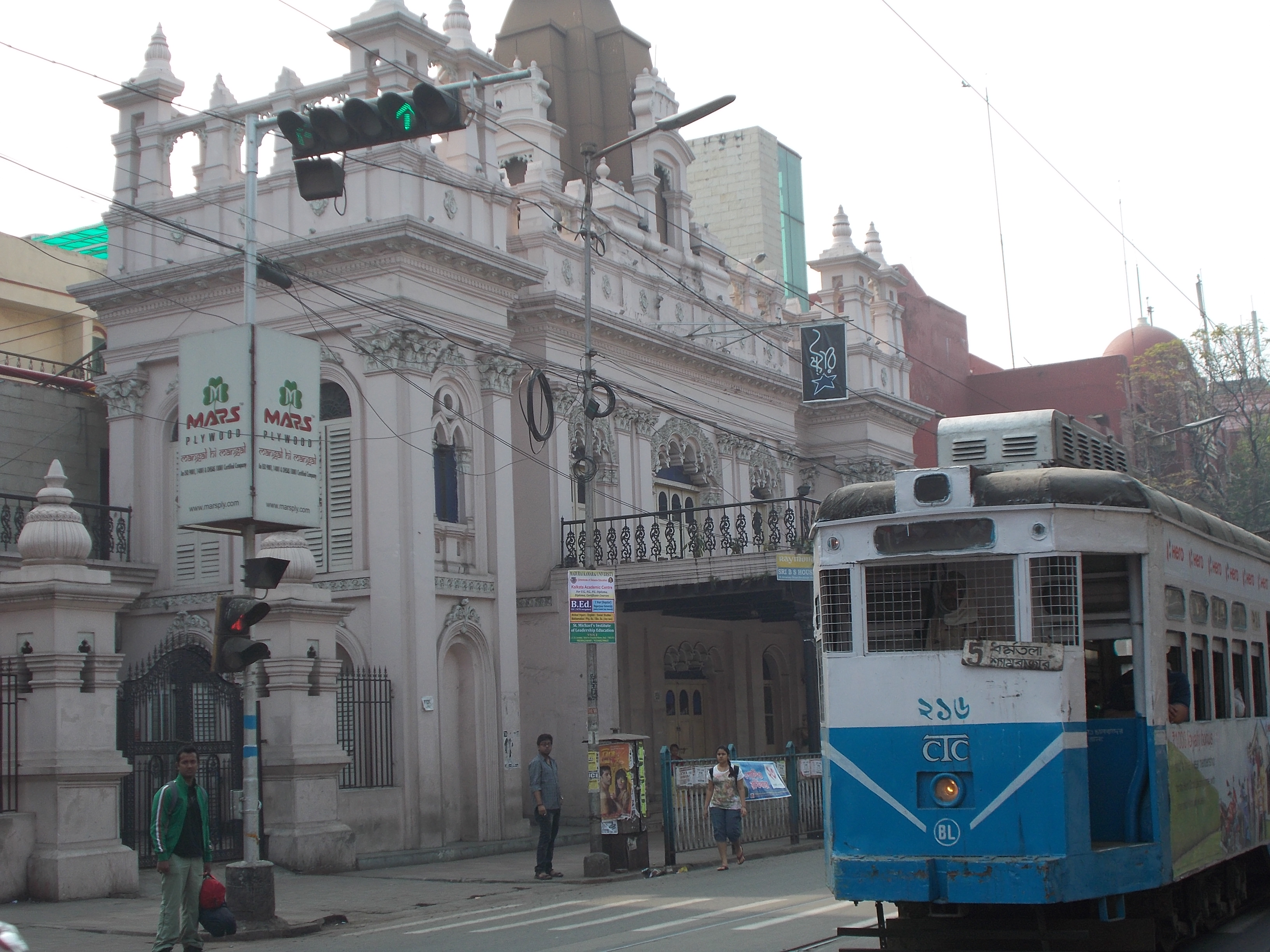
- Facade of Star Theatre
- Interactive map of the Binodini Theatre area
- Former names: Star Theatre

General information
- Status: Active
- Type: Cinema Hall
- Location: 79/3/4 Bidhan Sarani, Hatibagan, Kolkata, West Bengal, India
- Inaugurated: 21 July, 1883
- Owner: Government of West Bengal

The Star Theatre, is a theatre in Hatibagan, Kolkata. It was built in 1883. Initially situated in Beadon Street, the theatre later moved to Cornwallis Street - now called Bidhan Sarani. The Binodini Theatre, along with the Minerva Theatre, was one of the first institutions of commercial Bengali theatre.

== History and overview ==
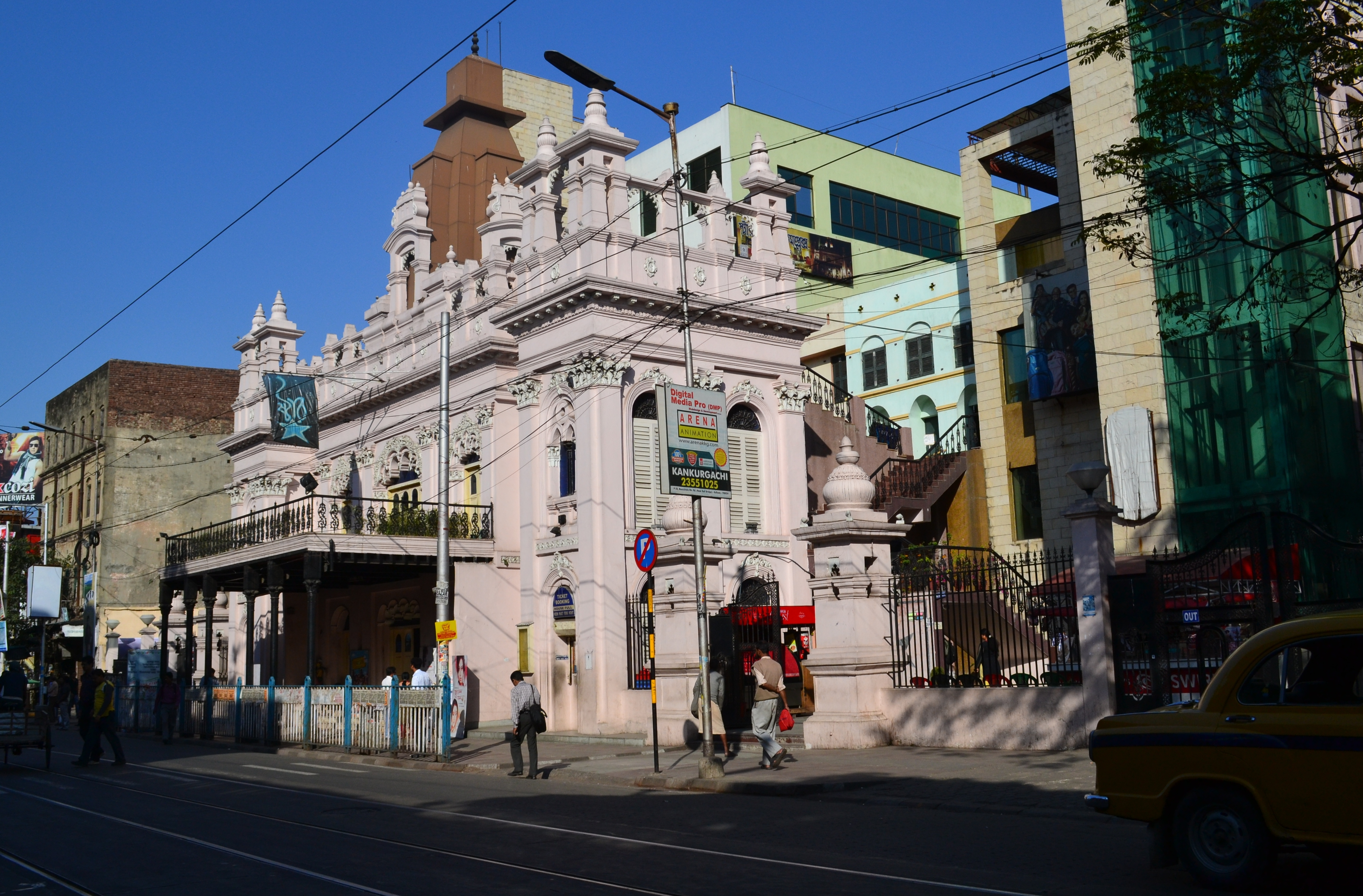
Star Theatre in Kolkata

The Star Theatre, along with Minerva and The Classic Theatre, were also one of the places where the first motion pictures in Bengal, made by Hira Lala Sen, were screened. Girish Chandra Ghosh was one of the first to produce plays at the Star Theatre, in the 1880s. It is a heritage site of Calcutta (Kolkata) that was destroyed in a fire and thereafter restored by the local municipal corporation. The restored Star Theatre maintains the heritage facade; the interiors are contemporary. The property is maintained by a private company.

At present, it is primarily a cinema hall; plays are staged on about two days per month. However, during winter (December and January) plays are staged here much more frequently, of the order of ten days per month. The auditorium has excellent acoustics. Star Theatre is close to the junction of Grey Street (Aurobindo Sarani) and Cornwallis Street (Bidhan Sarani). The theatre is a 10-minute walk from Shobhabazar Sutanuti metro station. Star Theatre has an underground car park with a nominal parking fee of Rs 10/- per hour (minimum three hours). Tramcar tracks, and services, on Grey Street and Cornwallis Street enhance the heritage ambience.

In 2012, the Star Theatre was to be returned to civic ownership, "to stop commercialization of the historic building that was once visited by Bengali luminaries such as Vidyasagar, Ramakrishna Paramhansa and Rabindranath Tagore." In 2024, it was renamed as the "Binodini Theatre by CM Mamata Banerjee. It was done to pay respect to Binodini Dasi, due to her close professional connection with the theatre and the importance of Star Theatre in her career.
