= Barowari =

Public organisation of Durga Puja festival

Barowari (Bengali: বারোয়ারি) refers to the public organisation of a religious entity, mainly in West Bengal, India. Barowari has significance associated with the Durga Puja festival, in which the Hindu Goddess Durga is worshipped; symbolising the victory of good over evil. The word "Barowari" comes from the Sanskrit words "bar", which means public, and Persian word "wari", means For.

In regional language, Barowari is often followed by the word Puja (Barowari Puja) which is when friends and families gather and contribute to a spiritual event. In 1790, twelve brahmin friends in Guptipara, Hooghly decided to institute a community Puja, and when the neighbours started to become suspicious, they started a Barowari Puja in Bengal, which gained much popularity among the neighbours. Eventually, this occasion gained popularity across Bengal. Initially, Durga Puja was an occasion for the rich Babus of Kolkata. Later, individual initiatives declined as collective enterprises came to replace it.

In more recent times, the terminology 'barowari' is being replaced by 'sorbojanin' (meaning 'all-inclusive'). The Barowari festival is often organised to allow the participation of outsiders. The Barowari festival is held with funds raised from the public at large through donations or subscriptions.

== Etymology ==
The first publicly organised Durga Puja was held at Guptipara, when several men were stopped from taking part in a household Durga Puja. Seven of them formed a committee and organised the Durga Puja. There is a difference of opinion about the year of worship – 1761 or 1790.

== History ==
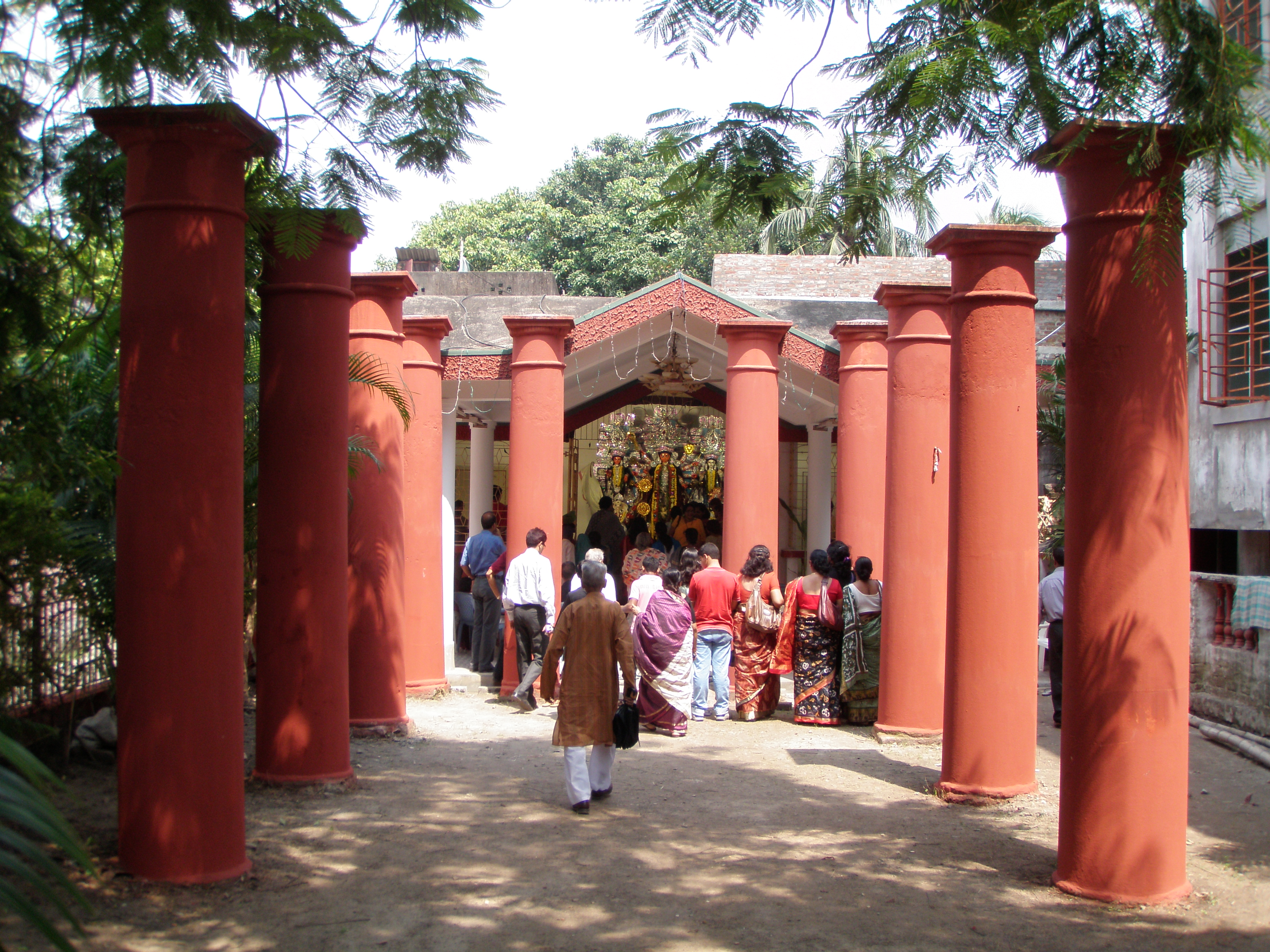
The Aatchala Bari Durga puja of the Sabarna Roy Choudhury family, first held in 1610

Durga Puja is possibly one of the oldest and the largest organised festivals of Western Bengal. There were numerous household Durga Pujas conducted in various parts of Bengal. Generally, such pujas allowed the general public to worship and the arrangements were taken care by the family who takes the initiative and spends money on it. The Sabarna Roy Choudhury family has been celebrating Durga Puja since 1610 in their ancestral home at Barisha.

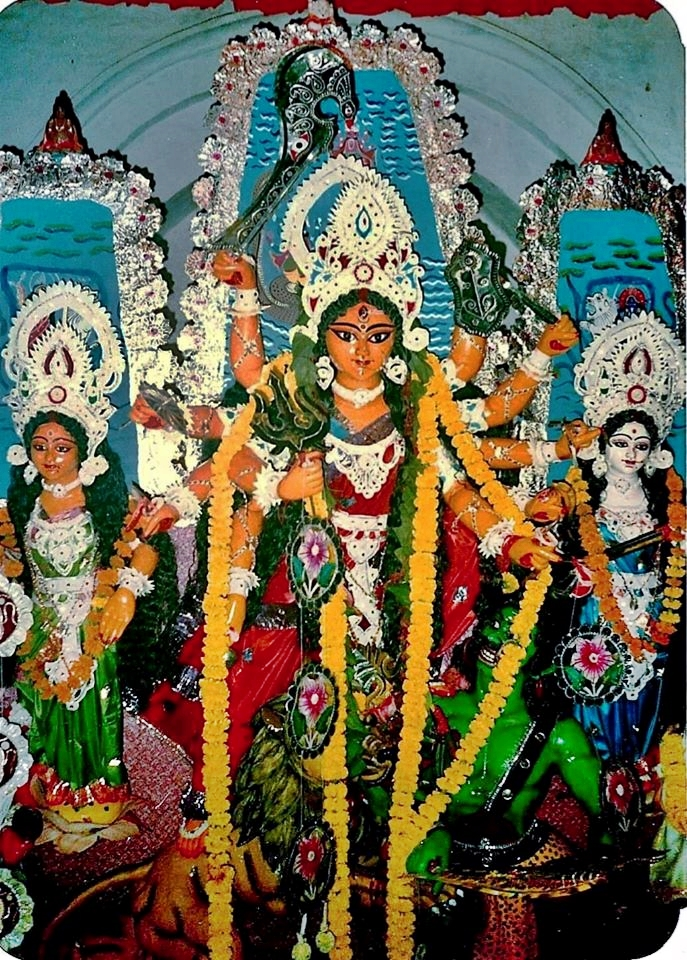
Andul Dutta Chaudhury Durga Puja 1988

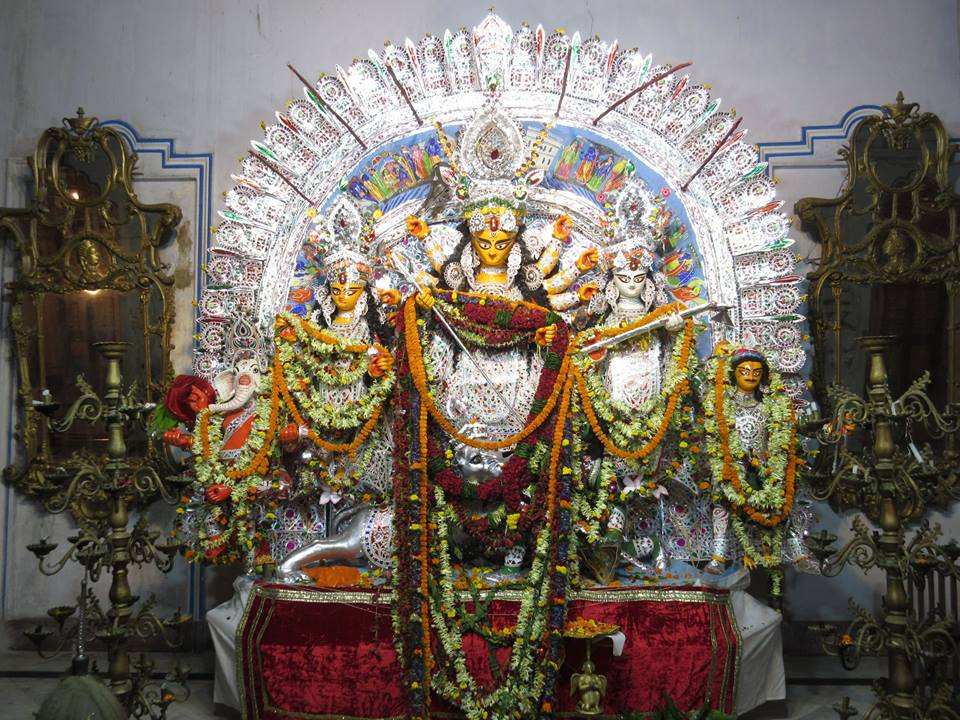
The Durga Idol of the Shobhabazar Rajbar.

Nabakrishna Deb started the Durga Puja in Shobhabazar Rajbari in 1757. He set a pattern for the puja, which became a fashion and status symbol among the upcoming merchant class of Kolkata. The number of Englishmen attending the family Durga Puja became an index of prestige. The nautch girls were mostly from Muslim gharanas. The Englishmen attending the dance-parties dined on beef and ham from Wilson's Hotel and drank to their hearts' content.

Rani Rashmoni used to celebrate Durga Puja at her residence with traditional pomp, including all-night jatras (folk theatre), rather than by entertaining the Englishmen with whom she carried on a running feud. After she died in 1861, the sons-in-law took to celebrating Durga Puja in their respective premises.

== Barowari Durga Puja ==
The twentieth century witnessed the emergence of community Durga Puja which was also at times organised publicly. The first Barowari Durga Puja was organised in Kolkata by Bhowanipore Sanatan Dharmotsahini Sabha in 1909 at Balaram Bose Ghat Road, Bhowanipore. On this occasion, Sri Aurobindo published the famous Durga Stotra in his Bengali journal, Dharma, issue one "Kartika" dated 1316 AD.

J.C. Nixon, in his "Account of the Revolutionary organizations in Bengal" noted: "Bhowanipore Party: owing to his striking personality, Jatindra Nath Mukharji was during this period gaining great popularity and esteem in anarchic circles. There is evidence for believing that the murderer of Babu Ashutosh Biswas, Public Prosecutor, on 10 February 1909, was a member of this party, while there is no doubt that Jatin Mukharji himself was one of the instigators of the murder of Khan Bahadur Shamsul Alam which took place on 21 February 1910."

Other Barowari Durga Puja that followed were the College Street Tamer Lane Sarbojanin Durga Utsav of 1915, Shyampukur Adi Sarbojanin of 1911, Sikdar Bagan (in the Shyambazar neighbourhood) of 1913, Nebubagan, which in 1919 became Bagbazar sarbojanin, Simla Byam Samiti of 1926 and Amherst Street Lohapatty Sarbojanin of 1943, which later became Maniktala Chaltabagan Lohapatty Durga Puja.

Presently, the Barowari Durga Pujas are celebrated in over 2,000 pandals in Kolkata.
