= Mitra Cinema Hall, Calcutta =

The Mitra was a single-screen theater, situated in Bidhan Sarani, Hatibagan, Kolkata, opposite of Minar Cinema Hall. It had started operation under Birendra Nath Sarkar as "Chitra Cinema" in 1931 with the screening of Uttam Kumar-starrer Dena Paona. The theater was renamed to Mitra in 1963 when Hemonta Krishna Mitra took the possession. The theater was closed for business after 88 years.

== History ==
Mitra Cinema opened in 1931 as Chitra Cinema, founded by Birendranath Sircar to screen early Bengali talkies, with Dena Paona as its inaugural film. In 1963, ownership passed to Hemonta Krishna Mitra, who renamed it Mitra Cinema, and in 1976 Dipendra Krishna Mitra, then a 28‑year‑old lawyer took over operations. After 88 years of continuous operation showcasing Bengali, Hindi, and English films ranging from Uttam Kumar classics to Satyajit Ray retrospectives. The hall screened its final show on 1 April 2019, citing the proprietor's ill health and declining patronage.

== Architecture ==
Mitra Cinema was originally constructed as a single‑screen auditorium with a 1,100‑seat capacity, featuring a ground‑level stalls section and an overhanging balcony supported on steel stanchions. The exterior facade combined plain plaster finishes with minimal Art Deco flourishes, including streamlined vertical pilasters and a corner marquee above the main entrance. A projection booth was housed in the rear mezzanine, accessible via a narrow service staircase, while the lobby led directly into the rectangular auditorium without a separate foyer. In 2018, a ₹20 lakh renovation introduced 7.1 Dolby sound, 2K digital projection, air‑conditioning ducts concealed above the balcony soffit, and upholstered pushback seating modernizations that retained the hall's original seating layout and sightlines.
