= Thanthania Kalibari =

Hindu temple dedicated to Goddess Kali in Kolkata, India

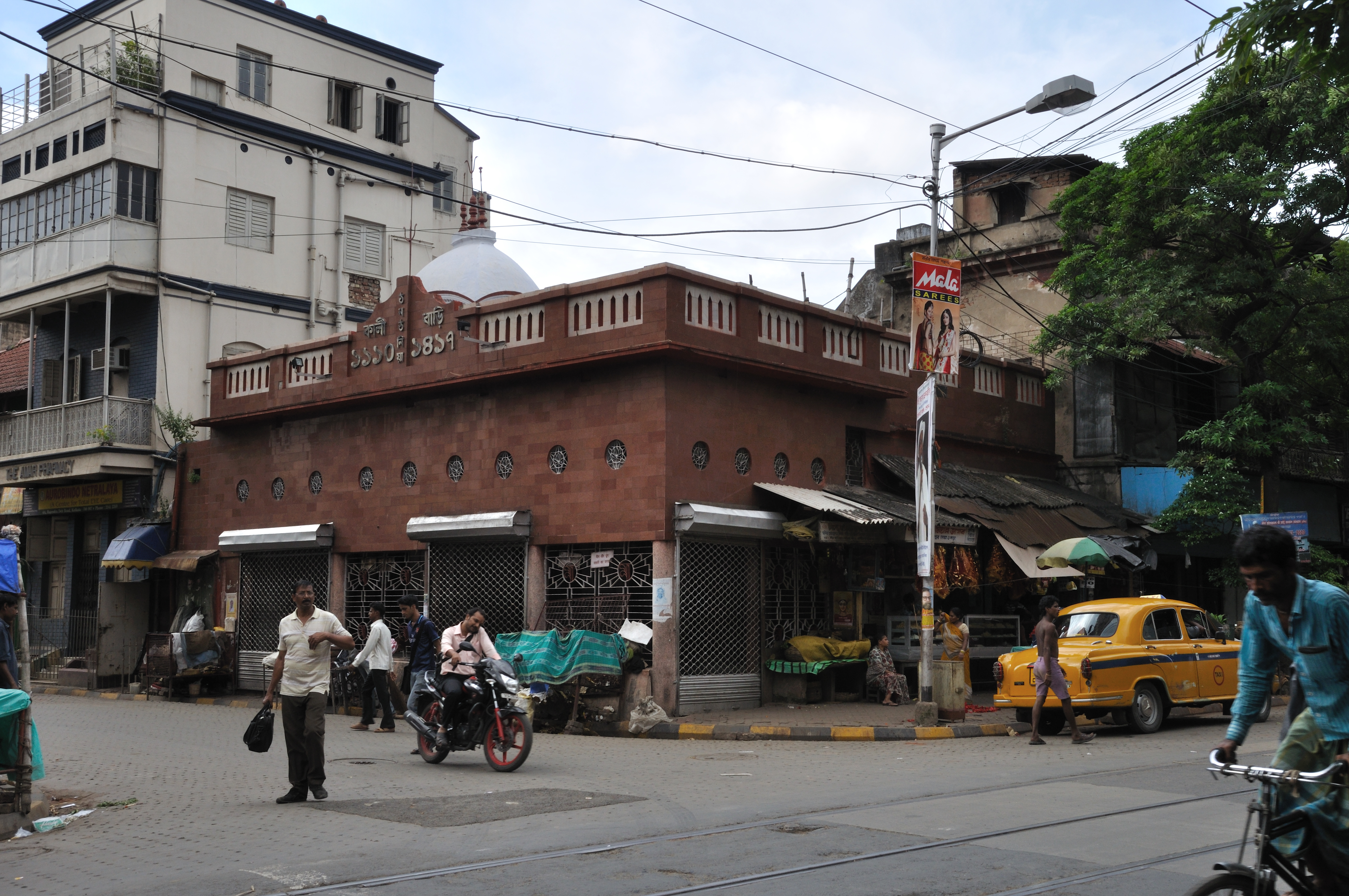
- Thanthania Kalibari

Religion
- Affiliation: Hinduism
- District: Kolkata
- Deity: Goddess Kali: Kali Puja; Phalaharini Amavasya; Kaushiki Amavasya

Location
- Location: Kolkata
- State: West Bengal
- Country: India
- Interactive map of Thanthania Kalibari
- Coordinates: 22.5813184°N 88.3656778°E

Architecture
- Temple: 1

Thanthania Kalibari is a Hindu temple dedicated to the Hindu goddess Kali, first of the ten Mahavidyas in the Hindu tantric tradition and the supreme deity in the Kalikula worship tradition.

One of the oldest Kali temples in Kolkata, Maa Kali is worshipped here as "Maa Siddheshwari". Located on Bidhan Sarani in Kolkata, West Bengal, India, hundreds of devotees gather at the temple for worship on the occasions of Kali Puja, Kaushiki Amavasya and Phalaharini Amavasya.

== History ==
The temple was built in 1703 by a tantrik Uday Narayan Brahmachari on a shmashana. The image of the presiding deity Siddheshwari is made of clay and was molded by Brahmachari himself, initially. With his limited finances, he built the temple of mud walls and the roof from palm leaves. At that point of time, the place was located in the dense forests of the Gobindapur and Sutanuti villages. The city of Calcutta was still not formed. When people used to pass through the forest trails close to the temple, they could hear the bells of the temple ringing a "than-than" sound. From there, the temple derived its prefix name "Thanthania".

Later in 1806, the present day Thanthania Kalibari was re-established by a businessman Shankar Ghosh. He also made an "ath-chala" "Pushpeswar Shiv Mandir" in the temple complex, while re-founding the temple. He took the responsibility of worshipping the deity daily and till today, his descendants worship Maa Siddheswari and also maintain the temple as the sevayets. Ghosh's grandson Swami Subhodhananda was a direct disciple of 19th century mystic Ramakrishna.

Some legends also mention that Ramakrishna Paramahansa lived close to this temple, when he used to come in Gobindapur-Sutanuti. He frequently visited the temple and sing out devotional hymns to Maa Siddheswari. The "bani" which he said inside the temple has been engraved on its walls, which reads "Shankarer hridoy majhe, Kali biraje" (Maa Kali resides within the heart of Shankar). During his stays, he preached to common people about the awakened Maa Siddheswari present in the temple.

== Maa Siddheswari ==
Maa Kali here is worshipped as "Maa Siddheswari". Maa Kali here is of dark complexion. She has four hands, each of which carry different objects and symbolise different ideals. She hold a "khara" in the upper left hand while her lower left hand hold a "narakpal". Her upper right hand is in a aashirvad mudra to provide assurance to her devotees. Her lower right hand holds a "barada mudra". Although there are a few gold jewelleries, she is mostly adorned with silver jewelleries.

== Worship of deity ==
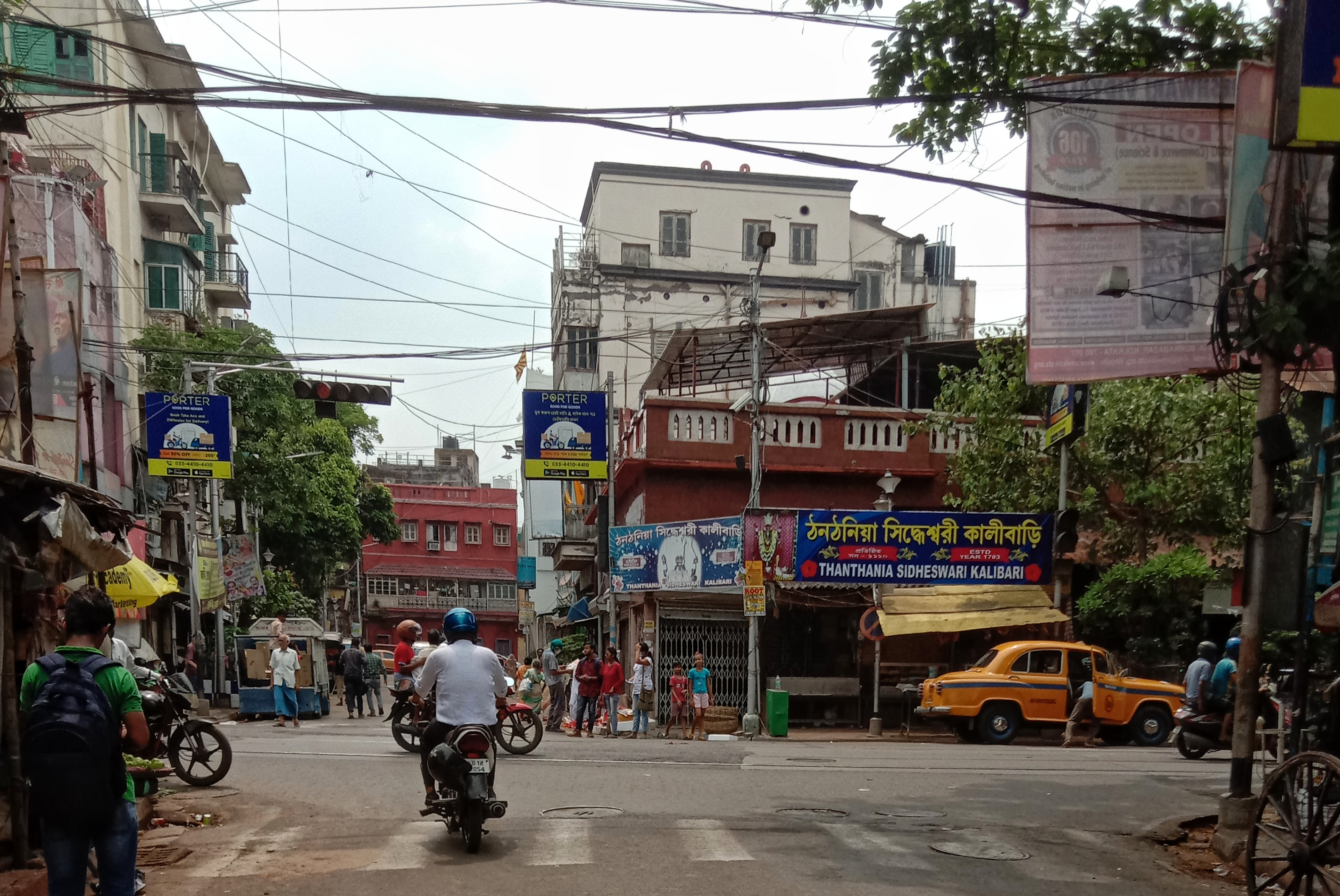
Thanthania Kalibari in June 2022

Presently, the idol is reconstructed every year is painted with the red and black colours. Tuesdays and Saturdays are considered auspicious for a visit to the temple. The temple is 300+ years old and the idol is even older.

The Temple remains open for seven days in a week. Daily it opens its door at 6:00 a.m. and closes at 11:00 a.m. It reopens its door for the devotees at 3:00 p.m. and closes for the day at 8:00 p.m. Since the temple is a Tantrik temple, all the rituals are followed as per the tantric traditions and hence, animal sacrifice is still continued on all no moon nights and during Kali Puja.

On different Amavasyas, the deity is worshipped in different forms. In the month of "Jaishtha", she is worshipped as "Phalaharini" in "Phalaharini Puja" while in the month of "Kathika", she is worshipped as "Aadikali" in "Aadikali Puja". In the month of "Magha", she is worshipped as "Ratanti Kali" in "Ratanti Kali Puja". On the day of Kali Puja in Kartik Amavasya and "krishnapaksha tithi", she is worshipped in her "Siddheswari" form. While devotees visit the temple all throughout the year, the day of Kali Puja receives the highest number of devotees.

== Prasad ==
Thanthania Kalibari is one of the few Kali temples in India, where non-veg prasad is offered to the deity. Although non-veg prasad is offered for the whole year, veg prasad is offered on the days "Dipannwita Amavasya Kali Puja" and "Phalaharini Amavasya Kali Puja".

The ritual of providing non-veg prasad started by Ramakrishna Paramahansa. He gave puja to Maa Siddheswari with the offerings of "dab-chingri", praying for the quick recovery of Brahmananda Keshav Chandra Sen. When Ramakrishnadev fell sick while his stay at Shyamapukur, his followers prayed at the temple to Maa Siddheswari for his quick recovery, while serving non-veg prasad to the deity.

== See also ==
- List of Hindu temples in West Bengal
