= Aurobindo Sarani =

Road in Kolkata, India

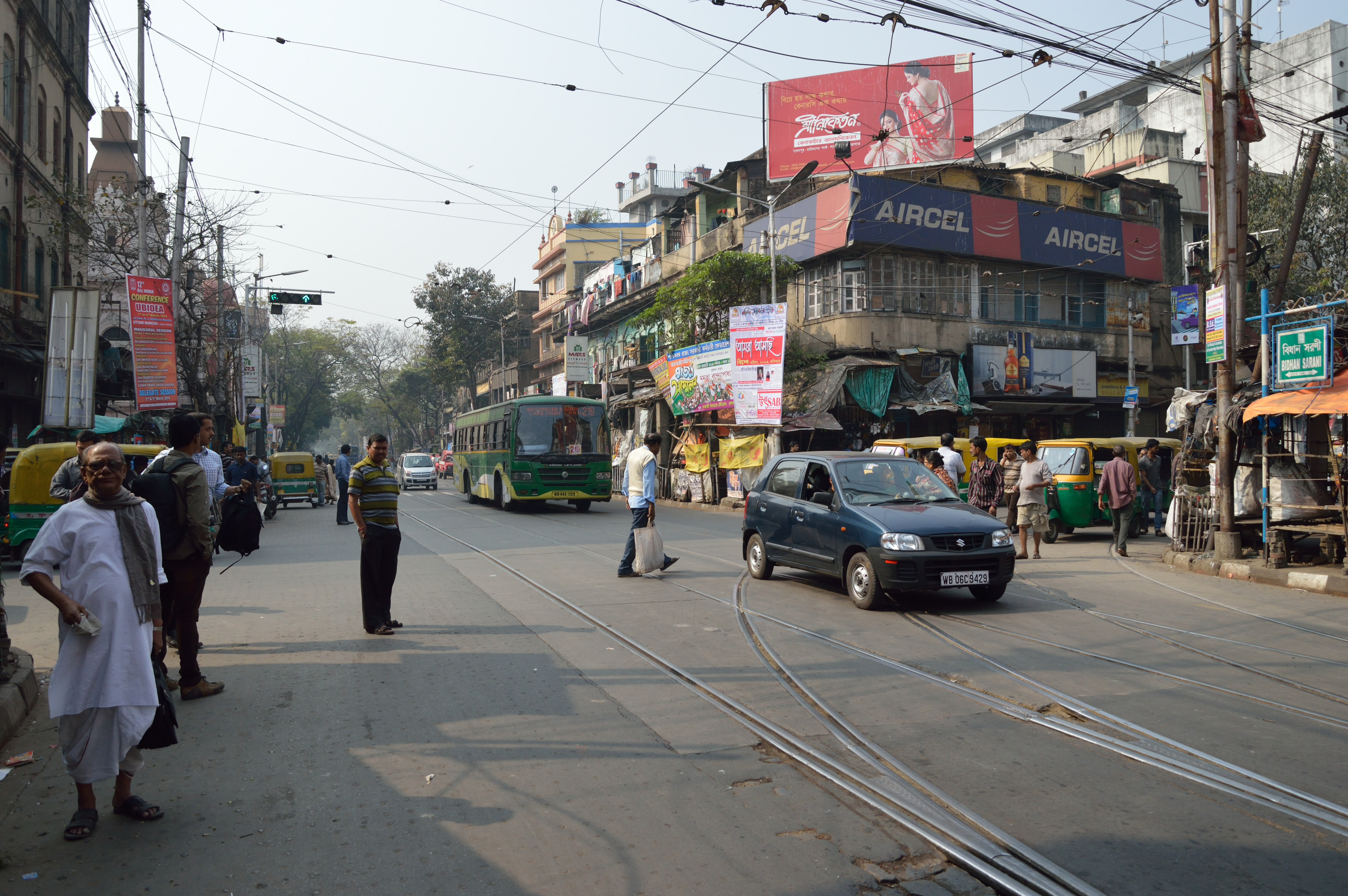
- Bidhan Sarani and Aurobindo Sarani Crossing, Hatibagan
- Former name(s): Grey Street
- Maintained by: Kolkata Municipal Corporation
- Location: Kolkata, India
- Postal code: 700004, 700005, 700006
- Nearest Kolkata Metro station: Shobhabazar Sutanuti
- Coordinates: 22°35′40.87″N 88°22′15.67″E
- west end: Shobhabazar
- east end: Ultadanga

Aurobindo Sarani (formerly Grey Street) is one of the oldest and most congested main roads in North Kolkata. The road connects Ultadanga with Shobhabazar. The name of the road is a tribute to Aurobindo Ghosh, a famous freedom-fighter of India.

Aurobindo Sarani consists of several important places, such as APC Road crossing, Bidhan Sarani crossing and Jatindra Mohan Avenue crossing. It is a very busy road, consisting of one of Kolkata's biggest markets, the Hatibagan Market, at Bidhan Sarani Crossing.

The road is connected to Ultadanga Main Road (Bidhannagar Road) with Arobindo Setu (Gouribari Bridge), over one of Kolkata's canals. The bridge was opened in 1974 and connects Khanna/Gouribari (Maniktala) with Ultadanga. The bridge is poorly maintained.
