= Minerva Theatre, Kolkata =

Theatre and cinema in Kolkata, India

Coordinates: 22°35′25″N 88°21′43″E

The Minerva Theatre is a theatre in Kolkata, built in 1893. It was erected at the site on Beadon Street where the Great National Theatre had previously stood. The first play staged by this theatre was Macbeth. It was initially owned by Nagendra Bhusan Mukhopaddhaya. In course of time, its ownership changed hands several times. Sri Girish Chandra Ghosh is noted for having given the last spectacular performance of his life in this theatre. "Minerva" was burnt down in a fire in 1922. However, it was renovated and in 1925, it regained its old status and play acting was resumed. The Minerva, along with the Star and The Classic Theatre, was also one of the places where the first motion pictures in Bengal, made by Hiralal Sen, were screened.

== See also ==
- Star Theatre, Calcutta
- Indian People's Theatre Association
