= Shyambazar =

- Neighbourhood in Kolkata (Calcutta)
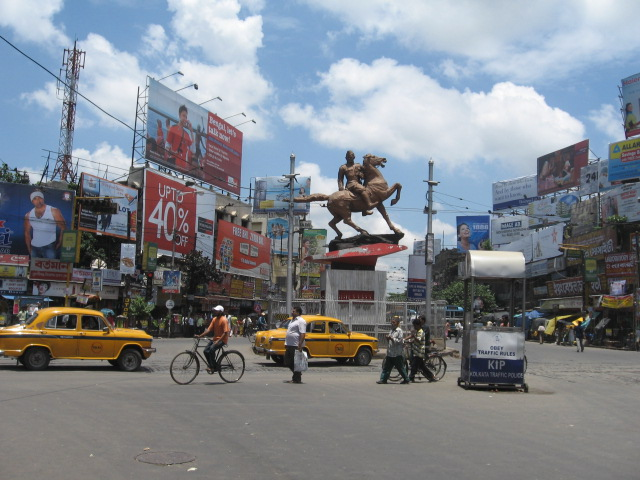
- Shyambazar five point crossing with the statue of Netaji Subhash Chandra Bose

- Location in Kolkata
- Coordinates: 22°36′04″N 88°22′26″E
- Country: India
- State: West Bengal
- City: Kolkata
- District: Kolkata
- Metro Station: Shyambazar
- Municipal Corporation: Kolkata Municipal Corporation
- KMC wards: 8, 9, 10, 11, 12
- Elevation: 36 ft (11 m)

Population
  - Total: For population see linked KMC ward pages
- Time zone: UTC+5:30 (IST)
- PIN: 700004
- Area code: +91 33
- Lok Sabha constituency: Kolkata Uttar
- Vidhan Sabha constituency: Shyampukur and Maniktala

Shyambazar is a prominent neighbourhood of North Kolkata, in Kolkata district in the Indian state of West Bengal. The popularity of Shyambazar five point crossing is due to the statue of Netaji Subhas Chandra Bose. It is one of the busiest and most important junctions in North Kolkata.

Shyambazar broadly covers Ward Nos.10, 11, and 12 of the Kolkata Municipal Corporation.

The Japanese dropped a bomb near Hatibagan market during World War II but it did not explode.

== Etymology ==
There was a big market in the area, which John Zephaniah Holwell called Charles Bazar. The present name was given by Sobharam Basak, in honour of his Kuladevata, Shyam-rai. The Basaks and the Setts were amongst the first to have settled in Sutanuti, after having cleared the jungles. Sobharam Basak was one of the wealthiest native inhabitants of 18th century Kolkata.

== Five-point Crossing ==
Growth and development of the neighbourhood and surrounding localities largely followed the construction of roads that opened up the area. The Oldest road in the crossing is Jessore Road (National Highway 12). Sutanuti had no roads, except the pilgrim path extending across it from Halisahar to Barisha. Chitpur Road (renamed Rabindra Sarani) was developed along this path. It passes through neighbouring Bagbazar and Chitpur. Road construction picked up in the early 19th century. The Lottery Commission (1817) and its successor the Lottery Committee (1836) opened up the native parts of old Kolkata. The main axial thrusts were from south to the north, parallel to the existing Chowringhee – Chitpur alignment.

The three-mile long Maratha Ditch was excavated in 1742 as a protection against the marauding Maratha soldiers then foraging in the countryside but who never came. It was filled up in 1799 to build the Circular Road, that ran from Shyambazar, right around old Kolkata, covering the southern end of the Maidan. It was metalled in the early 19th century. Around the same time, the most important axial thoroughfare from south to north — Wood Street (portion renamed Dr. Martin Luther King Sarani), Wellesley Street (renamed Rafi Ahmed Kidwai Road), Wellington Street (renamed Nirmal Chandra Sarani) and College Street — was built by the Lottery Committee. The new road to Barrackpore (now called Barrackpore Trunk Road), Cornwallis Street (now called Bidhan Sarani), Upper Circular Road (now called Acharya Prafulla Chandra Road) and the extension of Central Avenue (the Shyambazar end is now called Bhupendra Bose Avenue), which was built by the Kolkata Improvement Trust formed in 1911, also converged on the same point, making Shyambazar five-point crossing and one of the busiest street crossings in Kolkata. Shyambazar is connected to Tala and Paikpara with Barrackpore Bridge (over a canal) and Hemanta Setu (Tala Rail Overbridge) along Barrackpore Trunk Road (B.T. Road). Tala Bridge was firstly inaugurated in 1936.

Horse drawn tram cars were introduced up to Shyambazar in 1882 and in 1899, Calcutta Tramways Company Limited introduced electric traction. In 1902 the entire system was electrified. Subsequently, tramways were extended to Belgachia. In 1941, tram tracks were laid along Circular Road. Circular Road had a garbage clearance light railway up to the early fifties. For many years tram cars were the only form of mass transport in Kolkata. Although the first motor car appeared in Kolkata in 1896, motor bus services started only in 1920. Shyambazar tram depot is on Bidhan Sarani, near the five-point crossing. Kolkata tram route no. 5 starts from here.

The Shyambazar metro station of Kolkata Metro is also located at Shyambazar five – point crossing. Belgachia – Shyambazar section, along with Dum Dum – Belgachia stretch, was opened on 13 August 1994 and the Shyambazar – Shovabazar – Girish Park and Chandni Chowk – Central sections were opened on 19 February 1995. Services on the entire stretch of Metro, from Dum Dum to Tollygunge were introduced from 27 September 1995. While most of the metro railway was constructed by the cut and cover process, the Shyambazar – Belgachia stretch was constructed by tunnelling.

== Transport ==
A large number of buses ply through Shyambazar Five Point Crossing are as follows:

=== WBTC Bus ===
- AC 54 (Rathtala - Howrah Stn)
- S 9A (Dunlop - Ballygunge Stn)
- E-32 (Nilgunge Depot - Howrah Stn)
- AC-54B (Barrackpore - Howrah Stn)
- ACT-32 (Barrackpore - Howrah Stn)
- ACT-36 (Belgachia - Ecospace)
- D-36 (Belgachia - Ecospace)
- D-36A (Belgachia - Ecospace)
- S 69 (Cossipore - Santragachi)
- S 10 (Airport - Nabanna)
- S 21 (Baghbazar - Garia)
- S 45 (Baghbazar - Shakuntala Park)
- S 11 (Barrackpore - Esplanade)
- S 57 (Ariadaha - Nabanna)
- AC 20 (Barrackpore - Santragachi)
- AC 40 (Airport - Howrah Maidan)
- S 32 (Barrackpore - Howrah Stn)

=== Private Bus ===
- 3B (Milk Colony - New Alipore)
- 3D (Milk Colony - Sakherbazar)
- 3C/1 (Nagerbazar - Anandapur)
- 30D (Dum Dum Cant - Babughat)
- 30B (Gouripur - Babughat)
- 30C (Hatiara - Babughat)
- 47B (Lake Town - Kasba Dhanmath)
- 79B (Barasat - Baghbazar)
- 219 (Nagerbazar - Howrah Stn)
- 219/1 (Nagerbazar - Howrah Stn)
- 202 (Nagerbazar - Science City)
- 211A (Ahiritola - Langolpota)
- 215/1 (Lake Town - Howrah Stn)
- 227 (Bangur Ave - B.N.R)
- KB-16 (Bangur Ave - Shapoorji)
- KB-22 (Kolkata station - Jamirgachi)
- KB-24 (Kolkata station - Hatisala)
- K-4 (Dakshineswar - Ruby)
- 30A (Sinthee More - Esplanade)
- 32A (Dakshineswar - Salt Lake Sector V)
- 34C (Noapara - Esplanade)
- 78 (Barrackpore - Esplanade)
- 78/1 (Rahara - Babughat)
- 201 (Nimta - Salt Lake Sector V)
- 214 (Sajirhat - Babughat)
- 214A (Sodepur Girja - Esplanade)
- 222 (Bon-Hooghly - Behala Chowrasta)
- 230 (Kamarhati - Alipur Zoo)
- 234 (Belgharia - Golf Green)
- 234/1 (Belgharia - Golf Green)
- S-139 Mini (Shyambazar - Babughat)
- S-164 Mini (Tobin Road - BBD Bag)
- S-168 Mini (Nagerbazar - Howrah)
- S-180 Mini (Belgharia - Howrah Fire Service)
- S-185 Mini (Nimta Paikpara - Howrah Stn)
- Barrackpore - Howrah Stn Bus
- Madhyamgram - Howrah Stn Bus
- Paikpara - Garia Stn Bus
- Baghbazar - Garia Stn Bus
- Shyambazar - Bagnan Bus
- 93 (Kharibari - Baghbazar)
- 91 (Bhangar - Shyambazar)
- 91C (Lauhati - Shyambazar)
- 91A (Harao Banstala - Shyambazar)
- DN-18 (Baduria - Shyambazar)

=== Railways ===
Kolkata railway station is nearby, which is one of the 5 major railway hub stations of Kolkata Metropolitan Area.

Shyambazar metro station is the nearest metro station of Kolkata Metro.

== Commerce ==
Shyambazar is the focal point of shopping in north Kolkata. In fabrics and clothing, it can match College Street-MG Road crossing in Central Kolkata or Gariahat in South Kolkata. In Jewellery, it can match Bowbazar in Central Calcutta or Gariahat in South Kolkata. The once famous house of jewellers, M B Sircar of Shyambazar, Senco Gold, has given way to numerous shops of descendants using variations of the name, all across the city. In Fariapukur which is an important street connecting Bidhan Sarani and APC road, there was once the office of Bichitra Press where Sarat Chandra Chattopadhyay sometimes visited.

Many renowned Jewelry brand shops are located on the two sides of Bidhan Sarani. Braving the scorching afternoon heat and drizzles in the evening, people throng at roadside shops for the Chaitra sale offering attractive concessions. Shyambazar vies with New Market and Gariahat as the most crowded markets in Kolkata. The Shyambazar – Hatibagan area also caters extensively to customers on the eve of Durga Puja and for weddings, apart from daily necessities. A newspaper columnist wrote, "A formidable matron with husband and children in tow wading through the crowds at Gariahat and Shyambazar is a familiar sight on the eve of Poila Baishakh."

Shyambazar has two regular markets — Shyambazar and Hatibagan.

== Medical facilities ==
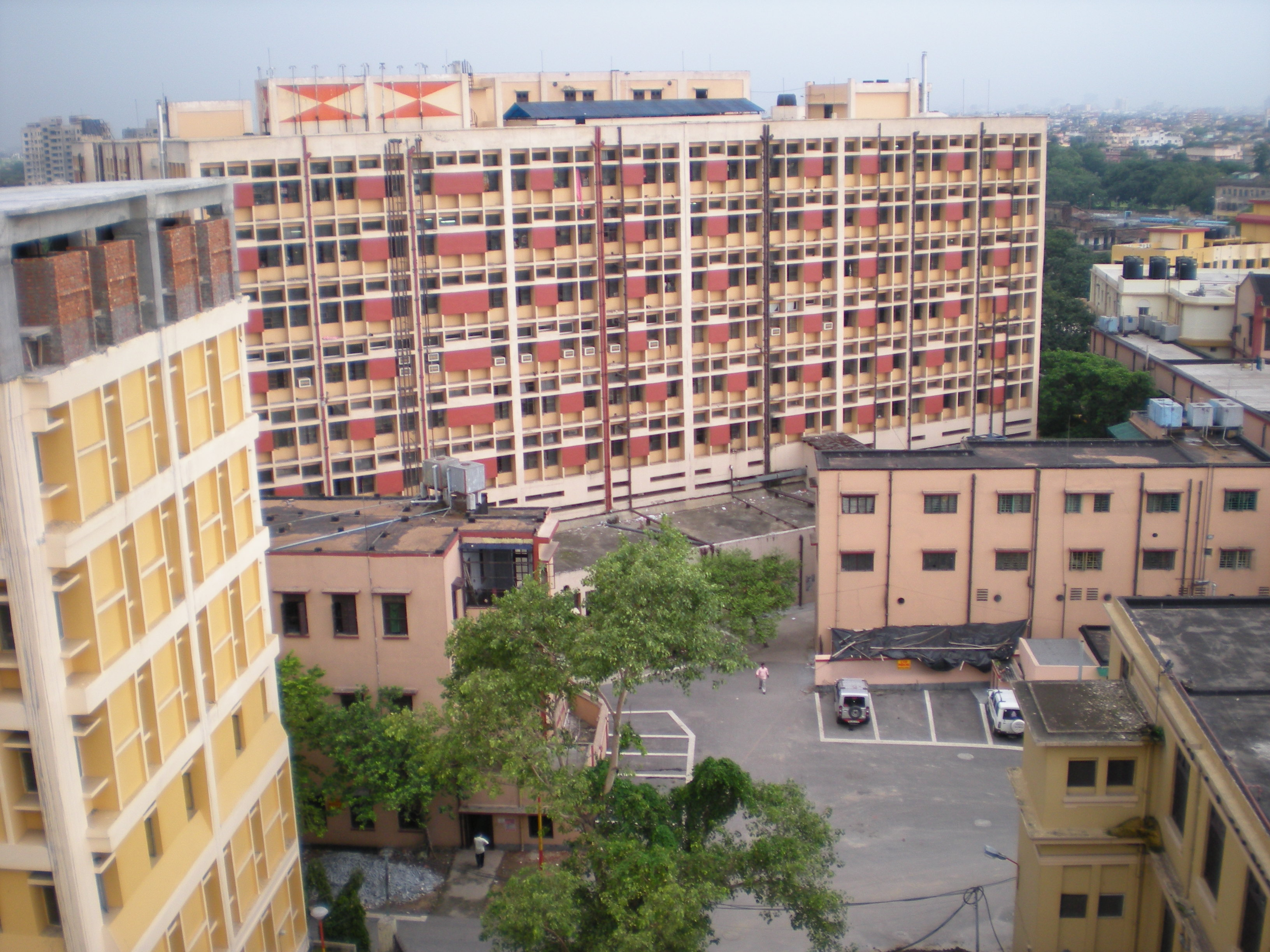
R. G. Kar Medical College and Hospital

Shyambazar is also the focal point of medical treatment for the North Kolkata and its Suburban areas. R. G. Kar Medical College and Hospital, one of the biggest and oldest medical college in Kolkata is located close to Shyambazar Five Point crossing. The area is also crowded with nursing homes and famous are Life Line, Dreamland Nursing Home, North Land Nursing Homes, Nirnoy Nursing Homes. Renowned private hospitals like Navajeevan Hospital, Sanjeevani hospital are also located here. N.C. Paul Clinic, Serum Analysis Center, Doyen diagnostic centers are in Shyambazar area.

== Sports ==
As Shyambazar is a crowded residential and shopping locality, there are few play grounds here. However, Mohun Bagan AC, one of Kolkata's leading sports clubs, had its first play ground at what is now Mohun Bagan Row. A plaque announces that the first play ground was in Mohun Bagan Villa from 1889 to 1892. Kolkata has a deep passion for football but other sports too have developed with time and have gained their share of importance and popularity as well. Tennis is one of them. Shyambazar Tennis Club operates regularly at Deshbandhu Park.

== Education ==
J.B. Roy State Ayurvedic Medical College & Hospital

== Entertainment ==
Shyambazar has traditionally been an entertainment neighbourhood. Nabin Chandra Basu staged the first Bengali production Bidyasundar at his Shyambazar home theatre in 1835. Later in the 19th century, crucial roles were played by Bagbazar Amateur Theatre and Shyambazar Natya Samaj, in highlighting the demand for public commercial theatres open to the public, as opposed to private home theatres of the rich.

Nandikar, one of the leading theatre groups in Kolkata is based in Shyambazar.
