= North Kolkata =

Neighborhood in Kolkata

Coordinates: 22°34′22″N 88°21′50″E

North Kolkata encompasses the northern part of Kolkata, including the city's oldest neighborhoods.

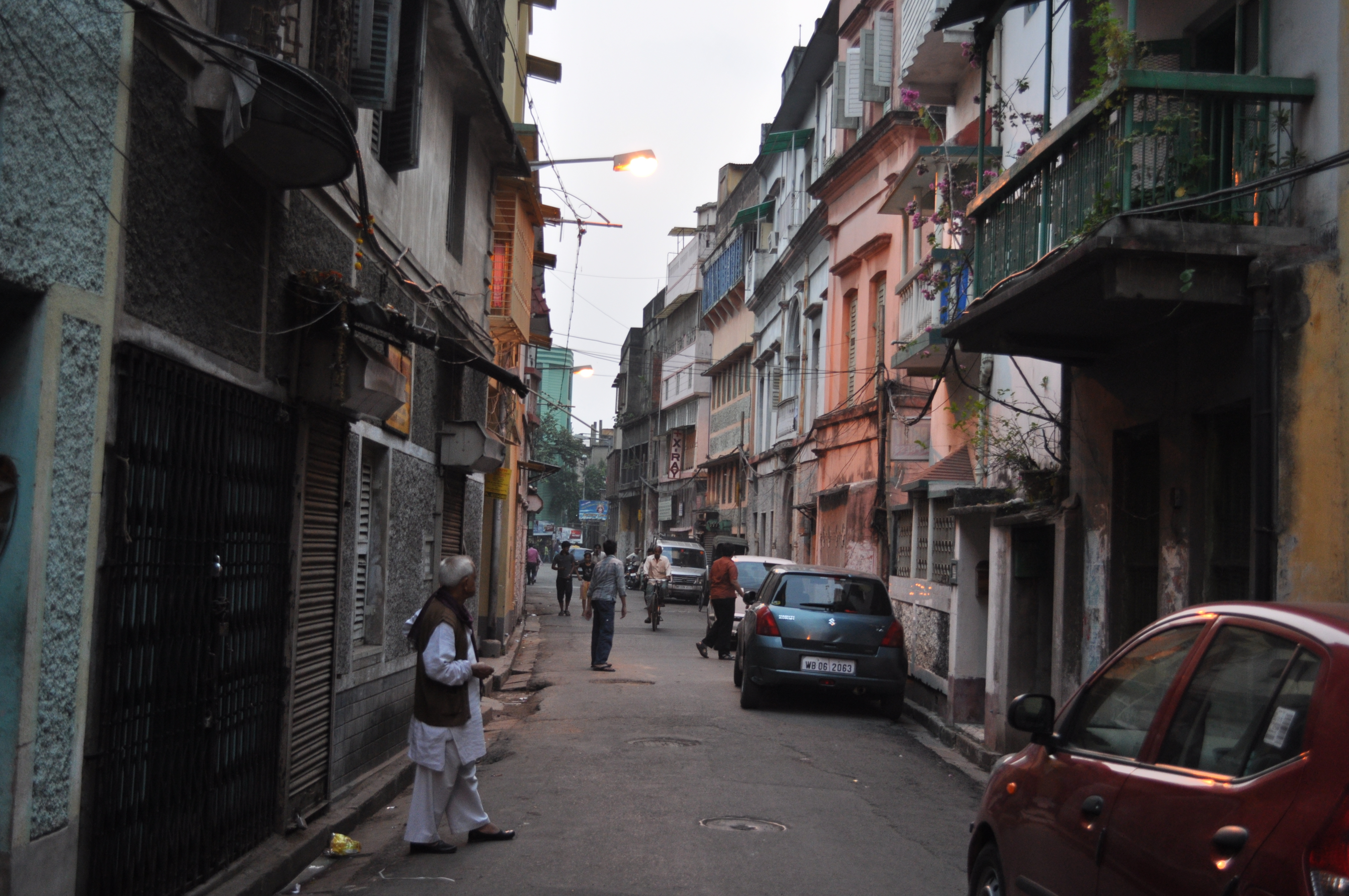
A lane in North Kolkata

Notable areas within North Kolkata include Shyambazar, Bagbazar, Girish Park, Kumartuli, Shobhabazar, Jorasanko, Pathuriaghata, Maniktala, Hatibagan, Kankurgachi, Ultadanga, Belgachia, Tala, Sinthee, Cossipore and Baranagar. Due to its rich cultural heritage, it is commonly referred to as "Babu Kolkata". This region is known for its old heritage buildings and temples, such as the Sovabazar Rajbari.

North Kolkata is home to several palatial structures, including Pathuriaghata Ghosh Bari, Laha Bari and Thakur Bari. This area also houses the main campuses of several universities, including the University of Calcutta, Presidency University, Sanskrit College and University and Rabindra Bharati University.

== History ==
North Kolkata was previously known as the village of Sutanuti. It was located along with two other villages, Gobindapur and Kalikata. This region, together with the central and southern areas, constituted the capital of British India until 1911.

== Auditorium ==
- Minerva Theatre, Kolkata
