= Shyambazar metro station =

Metro station in Kolkata, India

Shyambazar
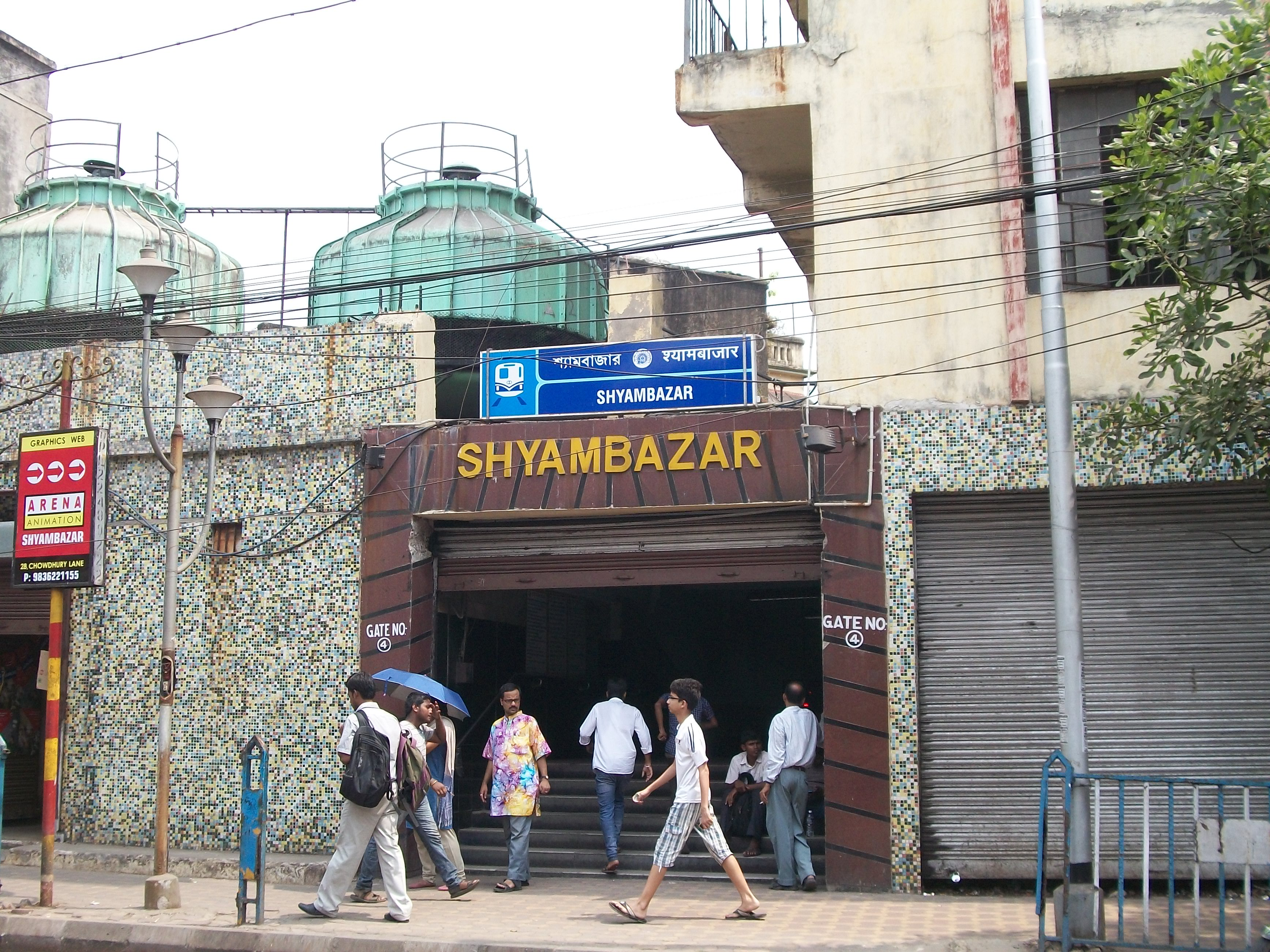
- Shyambazar Metro Station Entrance

General information
- Location: Bhupendra Bose Ave, Shyambazar; Kolkata, West Bengal 700004; India
- Coordinates: 22.601313°N 88.372586°E
- System: Kolkata Metro
- Operator: Metro Railway, Kolkata
- Line: Blue Line
- Platforms: 2 (1 island platform)
- Connections: Shyambazar: 5

Construction
- Structure type: Underground
- Accessible: No

Other information
- Status: Operational
- Station code: KSHY

History
- Opened: 15 February 1995; 31 years ago

Services
Preceding station	Kolkata Metro	Following station
Belgachia towards Dakshineswar	Blue Line	Sovabazar Sutanuti towards Shahid Khudiram
Route map
Location

Shyambazar is an underground metro station on the North-South corridor of the Blue Line of Kolkata Metro at Shyambazar, Kolkata, West Bengal, India.

== Station layout ==
G	Street level	Exit/Entrance
L1	Mezannine	Fare control, station agent, Ticket/token, shops, crossover
L2	Platform 2	Towards Shahid Khudiram (Sovabazar Sutanuti) →
L2	Island platform, Doors will open on the right
L2	Platform 1	← Towards Dakshineswar (Belgachia)

== Entry/Exit ==
- 1 – Shyambazar Five Point
- 2 – RGKMCH
- 3 – MMC College
- 4 – Bhupen Bose Avenue

== Connections ==
=== Bus ===
Bus route number 3B, 3C/1, 3C/2, 3D, 3D/1, 30B, 30B/1, 30C, 30D, 32A, 34B, 34C, 47B, 78, 78/1, 79B, 91, 91A, 91C, 93, 201, 202, 211A, 214, 214A, 215/1, 219, 219/1, 222, 227, 230, 234, 234/1, 240, DN18, KB16, KB22, K1, K4, JM2, 007, 7 (Mini), S158 (Mini), S159 (Mini), S160 (Mini), S161 (Mini), S163 (Mini), S164 (Mini), S168 (Mini), S176 (Mini), S180 (Mini), S181 (Mini), S185 (Mini), S189 (Mini), C11, C28, E32, S9A, S10, S11, S15G, S21, S32, S57, T8, AC20, AC40, AC54, EB1A etc. serve the station.

=== Train ===
Kolkata railway station and Tala railway station are the nearest rail stations. Bidhannagar Road railway station is also located nearby.

=== Tram ===
Tram route number 5 serves the station.

== Gallery ==
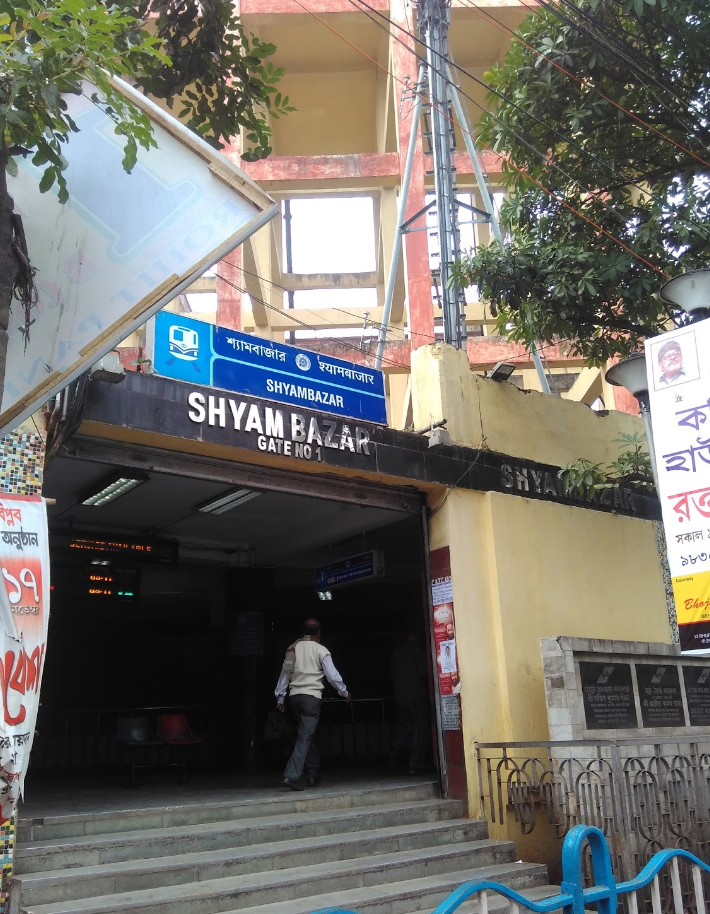
Gate No. 1 of the metro station

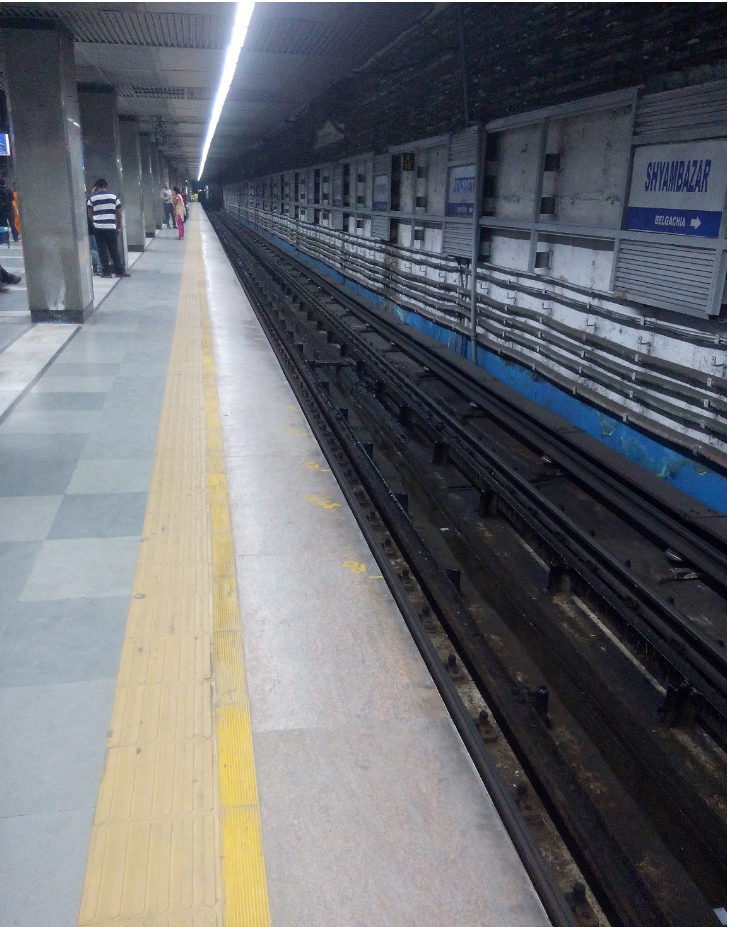
Shyambazar Belgachia bound platform

== See also ==
- Kolkata
- List of Kolkata Metro stations
- Transport in Kolkata
- Kolkata Metro Rail Corporation
- Kolkata Suburban Railway
- Kolkata Monorail
- Trams in Kolkata
- Shyambazar
- List of rapid transit systems
- List of metro systems
