= Sovabazar Sutanuti metro station =

Metro station in Kolkata, India

Sovabazar Sutanuti
- Shobhabazar Sutanuti Metro Station platform

General information
- Location: Jatindra Mohan Avenue, Sovabazar; Kolkata, West Bengal 700006; India
- Coordinates: 22.59602°N 88.36528°E
- System: Kolkata Metro
- Operator: Metro Railway, Kolkata
- Line: Blue Line
- Platforms: 2 (1 island platform)

Construction
- Structure type: Underground
- Accessible: No

Other information
- Status: Operational
- Station code: KSHO

History
- Opened: 15 February 1995; 31 years ago

Services
Preceding station	Kolkata Metro	Following station
Shyambazar towards Dakshineswar	Blue Line	Girish Park towards Shahid Khudiram
Route map
Location

Sovabazar Sutanuti is an underground metro station on the North-South corridor of the Blue Line of Kolkata Metro in Shobhabazar, Kolkata, West Bengal, India.

== Station layout ==
G	Street level	Exit/Entrance
L1	Mezannine	Fare control, station agent, Ticket/token, shops, crossover
L2	Platform 2	Towards Shahid Khudiram (Girish Park) →
L2	Island platform, Doors will open on the right
L2	Platform 1	← Towards Dakshineswar (Shyambazar)

== Connections ==
=== Bus ===
Bus route number 3B, 30C, 43, 47B, 78, 211, 211A, 211B, 214, 214A, 215/1, 215A, 219/1, 222, 242, 5 (Mini), 7 (Mini), S139 (Mini), S159 (Mini), S160 (Mini), S161 (Mini), S163 (Mini), S164 (Mini), S166/1 (Mini), S168 (Mini), S175 (Mini), S176 (Mini), S180 (Mini), S181 (Mini), S189 (Mini), C28, E32, S9A, S10, S11, S15G, S17A, S32, S32A, S57, AC20, AC40, AC54 etc. serve the station.

=== Train ===
Sovabazar Ahiritola railway station is the nearest rail station. Bidhannagar Road railway station is also located nearby.

=== Auto ===
Ahiritola to Ultadanga via Shobhabazar Sutanuti Metro Station and B.K.Paul to Cossipore 4B Bus stand via Baghbazar

== Entry/Exit ==
- 1 – Main gate (Aurobindo Sarani)
- 2 – SA Jaipuria College
- 3 – BK Paul Avenue
Gate no. 1 of the metro station

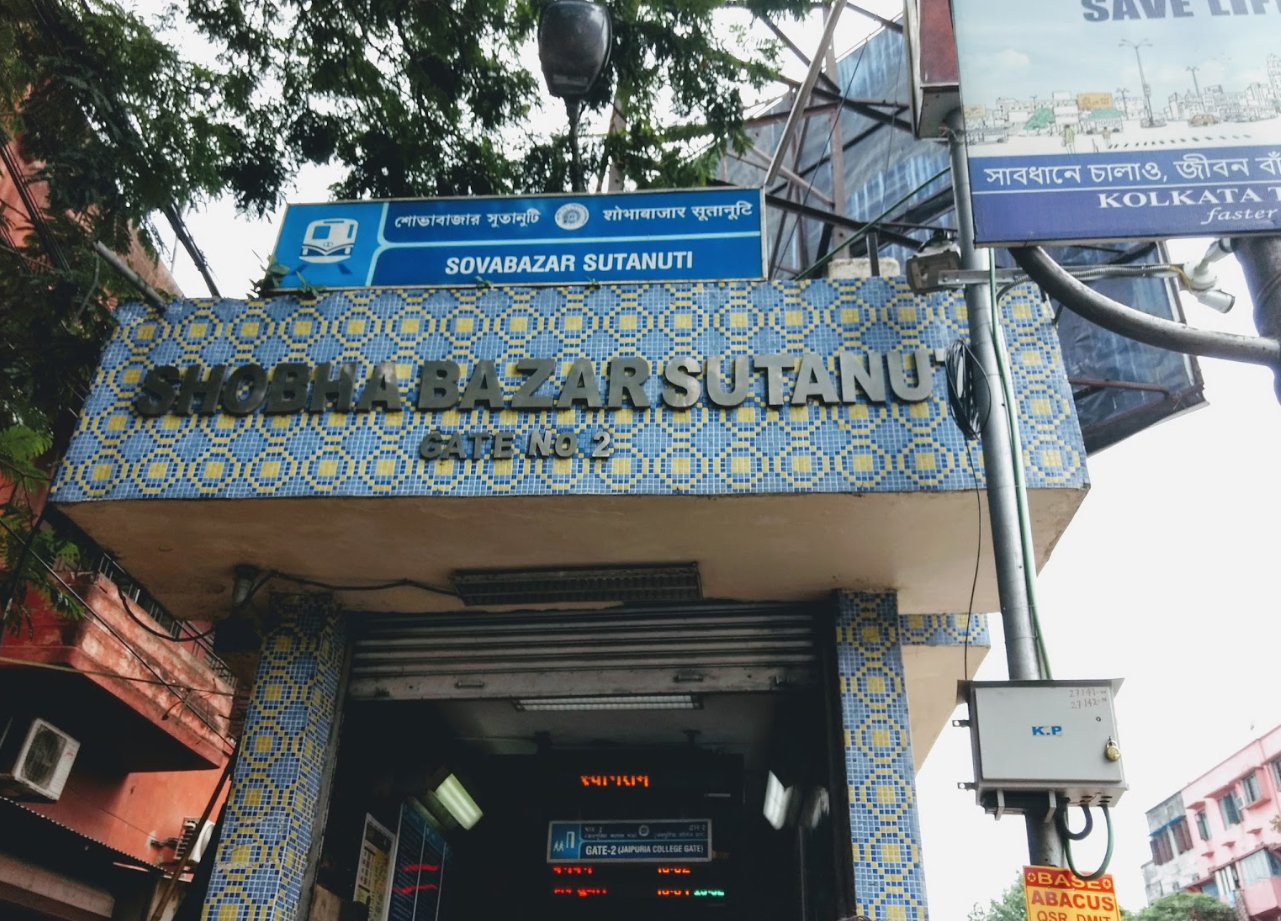
Gate no. 2 of the metro station

Gate no. 3 of the metro station

== See also ==
- Kolkata
- List of Kolkata Metro stations
- Transport in Kolkata
- Kolkata Metro Rail Corporation
- Kolkata Suburban Railway
- Kolkata Monorail
- Trams in Kolkata
- Shobhabazar
- List of rapid transit systems
- List of metro systems
