= Tala tank =

Water tower in Kolkata, India

- Alternative names: Tallah Tank

General information
- Status: Operational
- Location: Kolkata, 71, Barrackpore Trunk Road, Paikpara, West Bengal, India
- Coordinates: 22°36′36″N 88°22′44″E
- Construction started: 18 November 1909
- Completed: 12 January 1911
- Opened: 16 May 1911; 115 years ago
- Cost: ₹1.1 million (equivalent to ₹400 million or US$4.2 million in 2026) in 1909–10
- Owner: Kolkata Municipal Corporation
- Governing body: Kolkata Municipal Corporation

Height
- Height: 110 ft (34 m)

Dimensions
- Weight: 44 thousand tonnes

Technical details
- Material: Concrete, Steel and Burmese teak wood
- Floor area: 321 ft^{2} (29.8 m^{2})
- Grounds: 3–4 acres (12–16 thousand square metres)

Design and construction
- Architect: W. B. MacCabe
- Architecture firm: Calcutta Corporation Water Works
- Main contractor: M/s T K Mukherjee and Co.; M/s Martin and Co.; Arracon Co. and Clayton, Son & Co. of Leeds
- Known for: World's largest overhead water reservoir

Website
- kmcgov.in/WaterSupply

The Tala tank, also spelled Tallah tank (Bengali pronunciation: [ˈʈala tæŋk]), is a water tower in Kolkata, West Bengal, India. Construction started in 1909 and it was inaugurated in May 1911 by Edward Norman Baker, the Lieutenant Governor of Bengal. The tank, which is owned by Kolkata Municipal Corporation, is fed by Palta Water Works near Barrackpore. More than 110 years after construction, the tower remains the major water supplier to the city of Kolkata.

The water tower, which is claimed to be the world's largest overhead water reservoir, covers 3–4 acres (12,000–16,000 m^{2}), has a capacity of 9.9 million imperial gallons (45,000 cubic metres), stands 110 ft (34 m) off the ground and weighs 44 thousand tonnes – including water – at maximum capacity. The tank has four individually isolated chambers and a single pipeline for the water source from Palta and to send the water supply to the city.

The steel was imported from the United Kingdom and is of similar quality to that which was used to build the RMS Titanic. It has survived multiple calamities including the 1934 Nepal–India earthquake, World War II Imperial Japanese aerial bombings from 1942 to 1944 and Cyclone Amphan in 2020.

The water tower has undergone renovations since its centenary, under the consultancy of IIEST Shibpur, Jadavpur University, IIT Kharagpur and Central Electrochemical Research Institute at an estimated cost of ₹250 million (equivalent to ₹460 million or US$5.0 million in 2026). The renovations were carried out one chamber at a time to prevent interruptions in the city's water supply.

== History ==
Tala tank foundation plaque

Before pumped water supply to Kolkata began in 1820, the city's water was mainly sourced from the Lal Dighi (Note: Lal Dighi is a Bangla word meaning "Red Pond". It is a 25-acre (10-hectare) pond in Kolkata, built by the British who used to call it "The Great Tank", "Tank Square" or "Dalhousie Square") at B. B. D. Bagh, which the British authorities considered was the only hygienic water body in the area. In 1820, as demand for water grew, a small pump house was built at Chandpal Ghat to draw water from the Hooghly River. Water was supplied to a limited area through open brick aqueducts. The first drinking water was supplied to the city with the establishment of a small water treatment plant at Pulta Water Works, which started operating between 1864 and 1870 at Pulta (now Palta), a neighbourhood near Barrackpore and then 32 km (20 mi) north of Calcutta (as the city was then called – now the neighbourhood is part of North Kolkata). The supply reached the city via Tala and the first pipeline was installed in 1868 at a cost of ₹660,000 (equivalent to ₹320 million or US$3.4 million in 2026), having a capacity of 6,000,000 imperial gallons (27,000,000 litres) to cater a population of approximately 400,000.

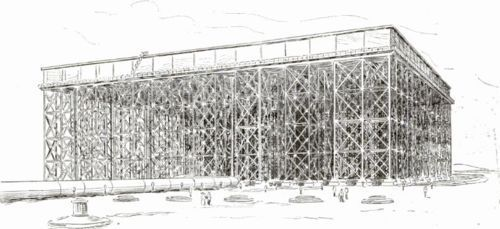
Tala tank in August 1911, after inauguration

Initially, Palta Water Works fed an underground reservoir at Wellington Square (now Subodh Chandra Mallick Square) in the city centre. It had a capacity of 790 thousand imperial gallons (3,600 cubic metres) which gradually became insufficient for the growing population. Supply from underground reservoirs proved to be challenging in terms of cost and time, and because of the very flat landscape in and around the city there was no suitable place to build a high reservoir. To ensure uninterrupted water supply to the city, the Assistant Engineer of Calcutta Corporation (now Kolkata Municipal Corporation or KMC), Arthur Peirce, conceived what became Tala tank in 1901. The Chief Engineer of KMC, W. B. MacCabe, designed the tank in 1902. Having a nine-million-gallon water reservoir overhead was a daring proposition. Edward Norman Baker, Lieutenant Governor of Bengal, commissioned the tank on 18 November 1909.

Philanthropist Babu Khelat Ghosh donated around 7 bigha [3–4 acres (12,000–16,000 m^{2})] of land for the construction. The lane adjoining the tank was later named Khelat Babu Lane. M/s T K Mukherjee and Co. (Note: M/s or Messrs, pronounced /ˈmɛsərz/, In India, messieurs is abbreviated as M/S or M/s, especially as a prefix to the name of a firm.) did the piling work. The foundation of reinforced concrete was built by Rajendra Nath Mookerjee's company M/s Martin and Co. It was heavily ballasted and compressed using steamrollers. A barrier wall was built with two rows of 25–30 ft (8–9 m) long piles and concrete around the plinth so it did not spread. Raw materials, wood and special anti-corrosive steel plates were brought from Burma (now Myanmar) and Middlesbrough, England, respectively, and fabrication works were carried out on-site. M/s Clayton, Son and Co. of Leeds, England carried out the work of fabricating and erecting the steel columns and tank. The flat top cover was made up of 66 millimetres (2.6 in) thick fine concrete, which was provided by Arracon Co. and Babu Kali Sunkar Mitter. The construction work was completed by 12 January 1911 at a total cost of ₹1.1 million (equivalent to ₹400 million or US$4.2 million in 2026). With new main pipelines and installations, the total cost of the tank was around US$1.55 million in 1911 (equivalent to $43.05 million in 2025).

Connections from Palta waterworks to the Tala tank were made with 42 in (110 cm) diameter cast iron pipes that were laid along Barrackpore Trunk Road. Pumps in a large building at Palta drew water from the river and lifted it into large masonry tanks and the water reached the city under gravitational force at a rate of 11.5 inches per mile (18 cm/km). The tank was designed to work as a water reserve for the main lines in the city. It connected the Wellington Square reservoir via Circular Road and Dhurramtollah (now Dharmatala).

=== Threats ===
The tank has survived several calamities since construction. The typical structure of the tank responded poorly to horizontal loading (wind, cyclones and earthquakes). In 1934, it survived the 8.0 magnitude Nepal–India earthquake. Another potential threat to the reservoir was the 2020 Cyclone Amphan, a Super Cyclonic Storm and one of the strongest storms to impact the area, since the 1999 Odisha cyclone. KMC and Jadavpur University (JU) experts and engineers assessed the risk and devised a precautionary plan to save the tank from toppling. They suggested half-filling all four of the tank's chambers until the cyclone had passed and cutting the water supply from the reservoir to maintain the weight balance against high-velocity winds and gusts, because the tank is supported by columns with no anchorage. The super cyclone did not damage the reservoir.

During the Second World War, the reservoir, along with the Howrah Bridge and Kolkata Port, was under constant threat of Japanese aerial bombings on Calcutta. The British were worried about this because it was the city's biggest reservoir. To prevent it from being bombed, it is said that grass was planted on top of the tank so it resembled an open field from above. Tala tank also endured bomb scares during the India-Pakistan Wars of 1947–1948 and 1965. At the time of the 1964 East Pakistan riots rumours spread that the tank had been poisoned by the Muslims. Out of fear, people in the city started carrying soda bottles, instead of water. A poison scare resurfaced in February 2011, when then Railway Minister Mamata Banerjee alleged that CPM party men might add poison to the tank and Palta waterworks. Central Industrial Security Force personnel were assigned to guard the tank as a security measure.

=== Renovation ===
During Tala Tank's centenary in 2009, minor renovations were carried out. The first major overhaul was planned in 2013 with 2020 as the deadline after an assessment by IIEST Shibpur, JU, IIT Kharagpur and Central Electrochemical Research Institute experts that showed the tank's condition was deteriorating and that it needed an immediate overhaul. The estimated cost was ₹250 million (equivalent to ₹460 million or US$5.0 million in 2026), 200 times more than the tank's construction cost. Signs of steel corrosion were evident at multiple areas of the chambers. Up to 2020, the reservoir had developed fourteen leaks. Vegetation had started to grow on the wooden sleepers and the sleepers had shifted from the original position. The renovation work included works like structural member replacement and chamber strengthening, replacement of wooden top and base by mild steel plates. The work was delayed multiple times, mainly due to lack of funds. Global tenders were placed in 2017 and work started in July 2017, with a cost estimate of ₹800 million (equivalent to ₹1.5 billion or US$16 million in 2026). The Government of India bore 33% of the cost and the rest was borne by the Government of West Bengal and KMC. Bridge and Roof Company was engaged to perform the overhaul. To compensate for the shortage of water during the renovation, existing pumps across the city's water network were upgraded and extra pumps were installed at Palta. In 2017, KMC installed a leak detection system in the tank. The first chamber renovation was completed and was opened on 19 June 2019 by the Mayor of Kolkata, Firhad Hakim. After the renovations are complete, this tank won't require any major repairs for another 100 years. As of December 2022, the deadline for completion of the renovation work was middle of 2023.

The renovation of the old, damaged 14 mi (22.5 km) Palta-Tala pipeline was carried out by KMC and RITES Ltd. under Jawaharlal Nehru National Urban Renewal Mission (JnNURM) at an estimated cost of ₹3.05 billion (equivalent to ₹6.3 billion or US$67 million in 2026) in 2009. The upgrade to 64 in (160 cm) diameter pipeline system was completed in 2012 and cost ₹3.26 billion (equivalent to ₹6.7 billion or US$72 million in 2026).

== Structure ==
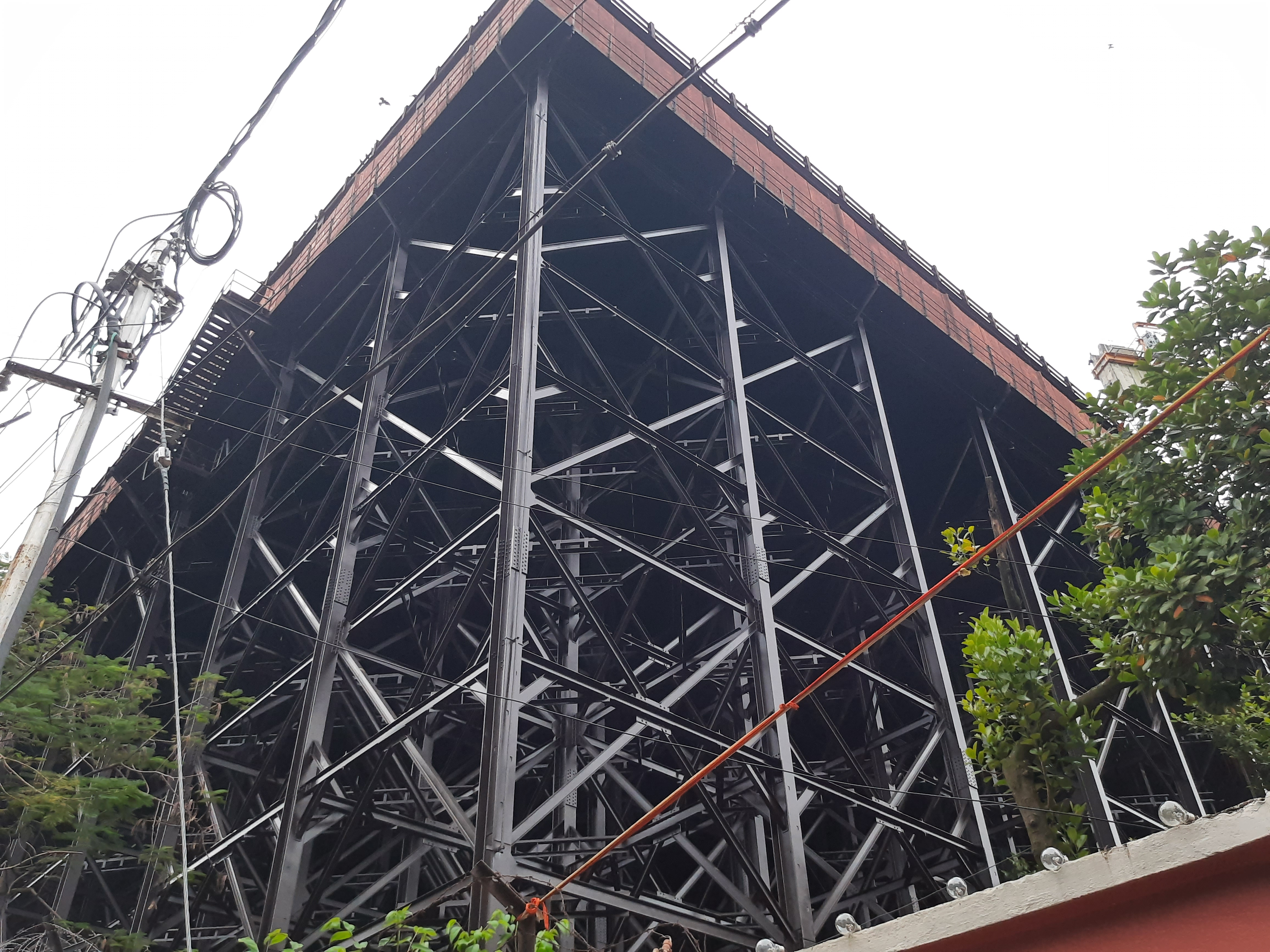
Steel columns supporting the tank

Tala Tank is claimed to be the largest overhead reservoir in the world was constructed on the 250-year-old Barrackpore Trunk Road. It is a square, 110 ft (34 m) high, 321 ft (98 m) wide and 16 ft (4.9 m) deep structure, that has a floor area of 321 ft^{2} (29.8 m^{2}). It is made of Burmese teak wood and steel of the same quality that was used in RMS Titanic. Because the soil's bearing capacity is limited due to silt below Kolkata, the tank was built upon a 2.5 ft (0.76 m) monolithic concrete bed weighing 26 thousand tonnes. The structure's piling uses 20–25 ft (6–8 m) logs with fragmented bricks (or "Jhama Khoa" in Bangla). The 288–295, 88.5 ft (27 m) columns, which are embedded on a plinth that supports the tank, are made of galvanised steel. This steel structure has 49 four-legged trussed grouped columns, 14 six-legged trussed grouped columns, one nine-legged trussed grouped columns and one seven-legged trussed grouped columns supporting the source and supply pipe. The bottom of the reservoir rests on wooden sleepers above the columns with no bolts or welding. The columns are braced in groups of four but no groups are inter-braced to provide flexibility to the structure and prevent it from vibrating. It has American roofing material, supported with steel beams (resting on steel joists) that helps keep the water cool and clean. The eaves are covered with brass gauze to deny access to birds and insects.

Structural plan of the tank

The tank is unique; it acts as a balancer. Having a single 60 in (150 cm) diameter mild steel riveted water source and a supply pipe that fills the tank during off-peak hours (Note: Off-peak refers to the period when demand is less than the maximum or not at the most popular time.) and stores water in four equally sized, isolated chambers and supplies it to the city and other major underground reservoirs according to demand. The water pressure from Tala assists the pumps to fulfil the main line's demand. The chambers were made independent by cross frames to individually facilitate maintenance in each chamber without hampering the water supply. The pipes open into a common compartment, which is fitted with eight penstock gates (two gates for each storage chamber). The total capacity of the tank is 9.9 million imperial gallons (45,000 cubic metres). It weighs 36 thousand tonnes empty and 48.5 thousand tonnes when full. The whole tank with the support weighs 44 thousand tonnes while the steel components weigh 8,500 t. Tala Tank can store enough water to satisfy the needs of Kolkata and the adjacent residential-cum-business district Salt Lake City for two days.

== See also ==
- Water supply and sanitation in India
