= Digi =

Digi may refer to:

- Short for "digital" as in digicam, digiscale, digiscrap, digibee
- Digi Communications, a Romanian telecommunications company in Romania, Spain, Italy, Portugal and Belgium
- Digi International, an American electronics manufacturer
- DigiKey, an American electronics distributor
- Digi.no, a Norwegian online newspaper
- Digi Telecommunications, a Malaysian telecommunications company

== See also ==
- Digital (disambiguation)
- Dighi (disambiguation)
