= Nilmani Mitra =

Indian architect

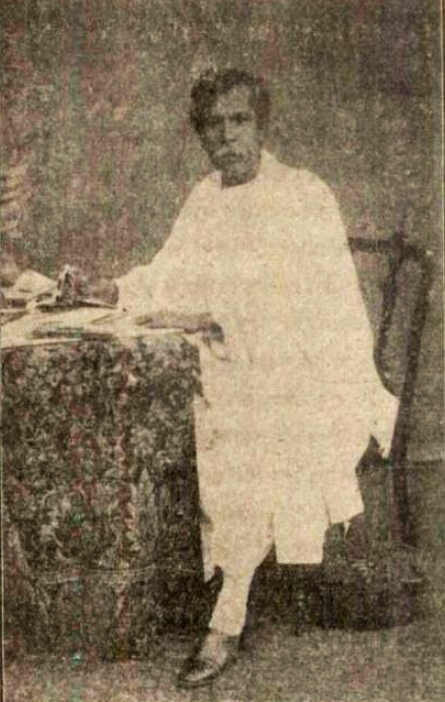
- Born: January 1, 1828; Barada, Diamond Harbour, Bengal Presidency, British India (present-day West Bengal, India)
- Died: August 24, 1894 (aged 66); Calcutta, Bengal Presidency, British India (present-day Kolkata, West Bengal, India)
- Education: Roorke Engineering College (present day Indian Institute of Technology, Roorkee)
- Occupation: Architect
- Father: Sukhamay Mitra

Nilmani Mitra (Bengali: নীলমণি মিত্র; 1 January 1828 – 24 August 1894) was an Indian civil engineer and architect, who designed the famous mansions of 19th century Kolkata. He was the pioneer behind the Bengali settlement in Madhupur.

== Early life ==
Nilmani was the descendant of Rudreshwar Mitra, the elder brother of Kashishwar Mitra who had built the eponymous ghat in Kolkata. Their family were originally residents of Gobindapur, who were driven out by the British East India Company during the construction of the second Fort William. Their family settled in Jelepara in Bowbazar and became impoverished. Nilmani was born to Sukhamay Dutta, at his maternal uncle's residence in the village of Barada in Diamond Harbour in 1828. This Dutta family is the descendant of Kandarpa Narayan Dutta Mazumdar, son of the choto-kumar Harisharan Dutta of Datta Chaudhuri family of Andul.

Nilmani spent his early childhood in his maternal uncle's house. He attended the London Missionary School in Bhowanipore and later went to the Free Church Institution (now Scottish Church College). He, however, could not secure any job, apparently because of his poor handwriting. He, therefore, took admission in Roorkee Engineering College (now Indian Institute of Technology Roorkee) (then an affiliate of the University of Calcutta) and became the first Bengali to become a graduate engineer.

== Career ==
Nilmani started his career in the Ganges canal division. He then became the Assistant Architect of the Presidency Division. In 1858, at the young age of 30, he rose to the position of Assistant Engineer. He quit the government services over difference in opinion, and began a private practice. During his career as a freelance architect he designed some of the most magnificent mansions of 19th century Kolkata. He designed the building of Sadharan Brahmo Samaj and Metropolitan Institution free of cost. He designed the building of Indian Association for the Cultivation of Science in Bowbazar not only free of cost, but himself donated one thousand rupees for the noble cause. He also designed the Basu Bati mansion in Baghbazar, Kirtichand Mitra's Mohun Bagan Villa, the palace of Jatindra Mohan Tagore and the Emarald Bower. He also designed the famous Jagannath chariot used in the Rathayatra of Mahesh. He also played a pioneering role behind the growth of Bengali settlement in Madhupur.

== Legacy ==
The Nilmani Row at Tallah, behind the R.G.Kar Hospital, is named after him.

== See also ==
- Vidyadhar Bhattacharya
