= Laldighi =

The term Laldighi or Lal Dighi may refer to:

== Bangladesh ==
- Laldighi, Chittagong, a historical reservoir in the Laldighi area of Chittagong
- Laldighi Mosque, an ancient Sunni mosque located at Laldighi, in Badarganj upazila of Rangpur district, Bangladesh

== India ==
- Lal Dighi, Kolkata, is a man-made water tank in Kolkata, India.

== See also ==
- Dighi
