= Ramakrishna Sarada Math =

Hindu monastic order

- Established: 1929
- Location: Bagbazar, Kolkata

Ramakrishna Sarada Math is a religious monastic order, considered part of the Hindu reform movements. It was established in 1929 at Bagbazar, Kolkata.

== History ==
In 1929, an internal dispute arose within the ranks of Ramakrishna Math and Ramakrishna Mission. The then manager of the Udbodhan Office, Bramhachari Ganendranath, had been accused of financial irregularities by the Mission authorities. Those charges were never established.

Ganendranath was an ardent 'sevak' of the Holy Mother, Sri Sarada Devi. It can be seen in the biographies of the Holy Mother how deeply the Mother loved Ganendranath. Most of the photographs of the Mother were taken by him. Ganendranath was also an associate of Sister Nivedita.

Kiran Chandra Dutt was one of the leading figures in Calcutta at that time. He belonged to the famous 'Dutt' family of Baghbazar. His family, along with the family of Balaram Bose, a householder disciple of Sri Ramakrishna, contributed much in the initial days of the Ramakrishna Order.

Kiran Chandra and other lay devotees of the Math and Mission including Shyamadas Bachaspati, an ayurvedic practitioner who treated the Holy Mother and Bhutnath Mukherjee, a renowned chartered accountant, were opposed by the Belur Math administration during a general assembly session of the Mission in March 1929.

Owing to difference of opinion with the then Belur Math authorities, 22 monks and 107 householder devotees of the order decided to form a new Math at a meeting at the legendary house of Pasupatinath Bose at Baghbazar to carry on the works on their own, based on the ideals of Sri Ramakrishna, the Holy Mother and Swamiji. The Math was named Sri Ramakrishna Sarada Math and the philanthropic Mission was named 'Vivekananda Mission'. The Math and Mission were registered according to government regulations on 13 December 1929.

By 1931 the Math and Mission had moved to its own house at 10, Ramakrishna Lane, Baghbazar.

== Presidents ==
The first president of the Math was Swami Nirmalananda (Tulsi Maharaj), one among the direct disciples of Ramakrishna and who devoted his life spreading the message of his Master in South India, especially Kerala. He was also instrumental in developing the Bangalore centre and establishing 18 Ashramas across Kerala mostly, two in present-day Tamil Nadu and one in Karnataka. But he held the post in a nominal way, while continuing to function as a representative of Ramakrishna Mission, founding new centres and developing the existing centres. The first secretary of the Math was Kiran Chandra Dutt. The Vivekananda Mission did splendid relief work in the 1934 Nepal–Bihar earthquake.

After the demise of Tulsi Maharaj in 1938, Swami Amritananda, a disciple of the Holy Mother, became its president till his death in 1941. Then Swami Chandreswarananda, a disciple of the Holy Mother and a brilliant orator, became the president till he died in 1946. Swami Asitananda, a disciple of the Holy Mother, was the next president, and he led the organisation till 1951.

Swami Tripurananda, a disciple of Swami Bramhananda, became the fifth president. He died in 1978. His disciple, Swami Vishnudevananda is the current president.

This Math used to publish a weekly magazine, 'Bharat'. Saralabala Sarkar, a leading Bengali writer, was associated with it and 'Sanjeevani' was the monthly organ. The first editor of 'Bharat' was Swami Chandreswarananda and the first editor of 'Sanjeevani' was Bramhachari Ganendranath. Swami Bhumananda published his famous biography of the Mother in the pages of 'Sanjeevani'.

== See also ==
- Baranagar Math
- Ramakrishna Sarada Mission Sister Nivedita Girls' School
- Baranagar Ramakrishna Mission
