= Basu Bati =

Heritage mansion in Calcutta, India

Basu Bati বসু বাটী
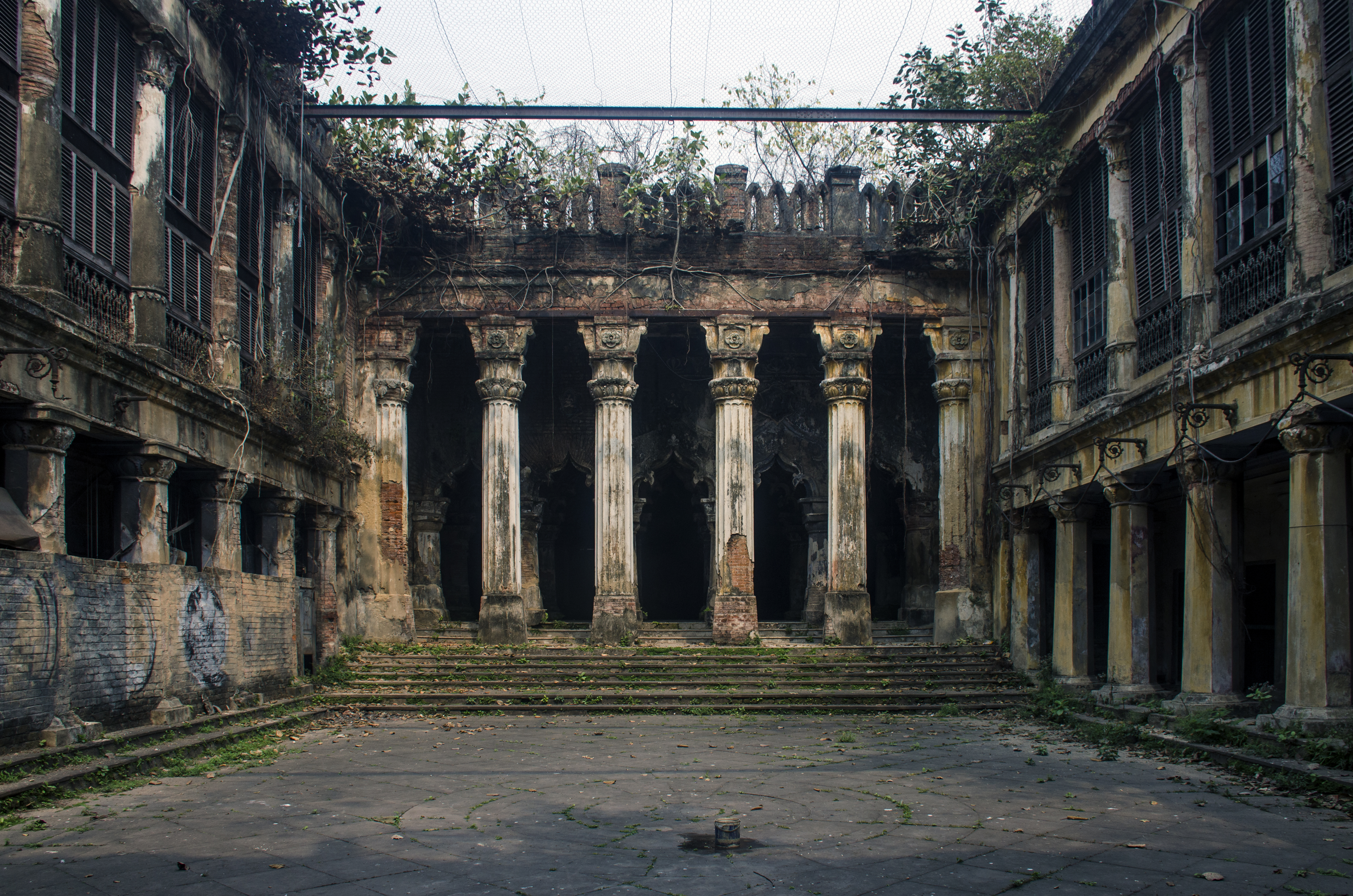
- The thakurdalan and its adjoining courtyard

General information
- Type: Mansion
- Architectural style: Bengali Renaissance architecture
- Location: 65/2 Bagbazar Street, Bagbazar, Calcutta, West Bengal - 700003, Calcutta, India
- Construction started: 19 October 1876
- Inaugurated: 18 July 1878
- Owner: Historically — The Basu family; Presently — The Government of West Bengal (eastern part) and Ambuja Realty (western part)

Technical details
- Structural system: Beam-and-column

Design and construction
- Architect: Nilmani Mitra

Basu Bati, also known as Basu Bari, is a Grade I heritage mansion in the Bagbazar neighbourhood of North Kolkata, West Bengal, India. It was built between 1876 and 1878 by Nandalal Basu and Pasupatinath Basu, who belonged to the Basu family of Kantapukur. The mansion is one of the prominent nineteenth-century residential architecture in North Kolkata.

During the late nineteenth and early twentieth centuries, several notable personalities connected with the cultural and political life in India, visited the mansion. Following Indian independence, parts of the property were divided among descendants of the family, while some sections came under the control of the Government of West Bengal.

== History ==
The Basu family of Bagbazar belonged to the Basu family of Kantapukur in Shyambazar, North Kolkata, whose origins can be further traced back to Deulpur in Howrah. Jagat Chandra Basu had two sons — Madhab Chandra Basu and Tarachand Basu. Madhab Chandra Basu had three sons — Mahendranath Basu, Nandalal Basu and Pashupati Basu.

According to the family records, Mahendranath, Nandalal and Pashupati were the 24th generation descendants of Dasarat Basu. Dasarat Basu was the first person to have officially recorded the surname Basu. Around 1874, one of the uncles of Mahendranath, Nandalal and Pashupati passed away. Mahendranath, being the eldest of them, earned his uncle's title and became the Zamindar of Gaya. With the help of the money that he earned through that title, Mahendranath purchased a large plot in Bagbazar. But Mahendranath died childless. As a result, post his death, the property was inherited by his brothers Nadalal and Pashupati, and they built this mansion under their tenure.

The foundation stone of Basu Bati was laid on 19 October 1876, while the family started living here from 18 July 1878. The mansion was designed and built by Nilmani Mitra, who was the first qualified Bengali civil engineer.

== Architecture ==
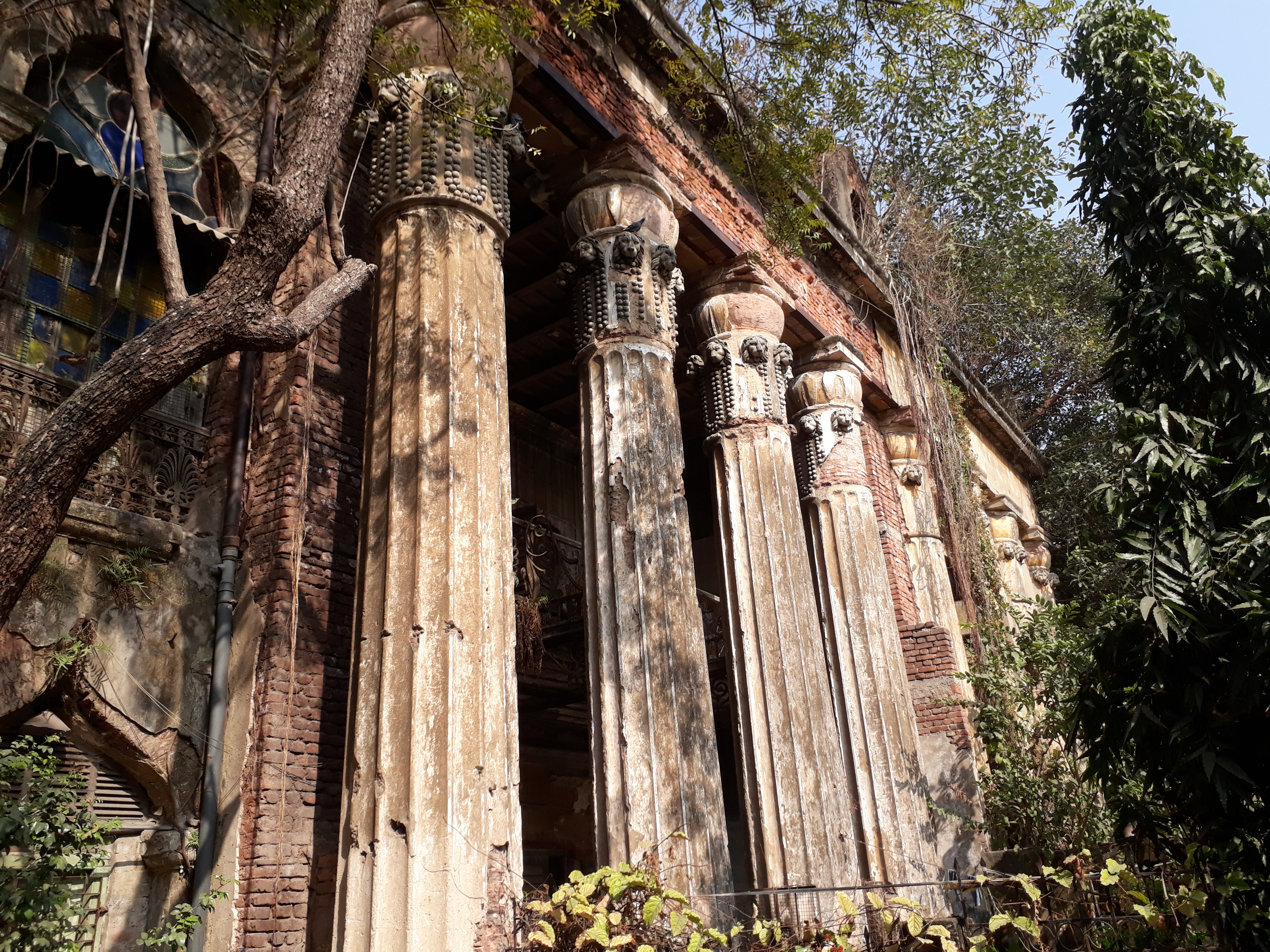
The Doric columns at the façade of Basu Bati

Basu Bati has a beam-and-column architecture and is heavily inspired by the Bengali Renaissance architecture. The façade of the mansion has 16 large Doric columns. Each one of them has stucco lion's heads, arranged in a circle towards the upper periphery of the columns. Each one of those lion heads is connected to each other with two rows of rudraksha bead garlands. Out of them, twelve columns have been renovated and only four of the original columns remain. The centrally placed main courtyard of the mansion is attached to the thakurdalan. On either side of the main courtyard, there are long corridors on both floors, which are lined with long pillars. The upper floor's corridors are lined with glass shades, in addition to the pillars. There's also a dance hall on the second floor.

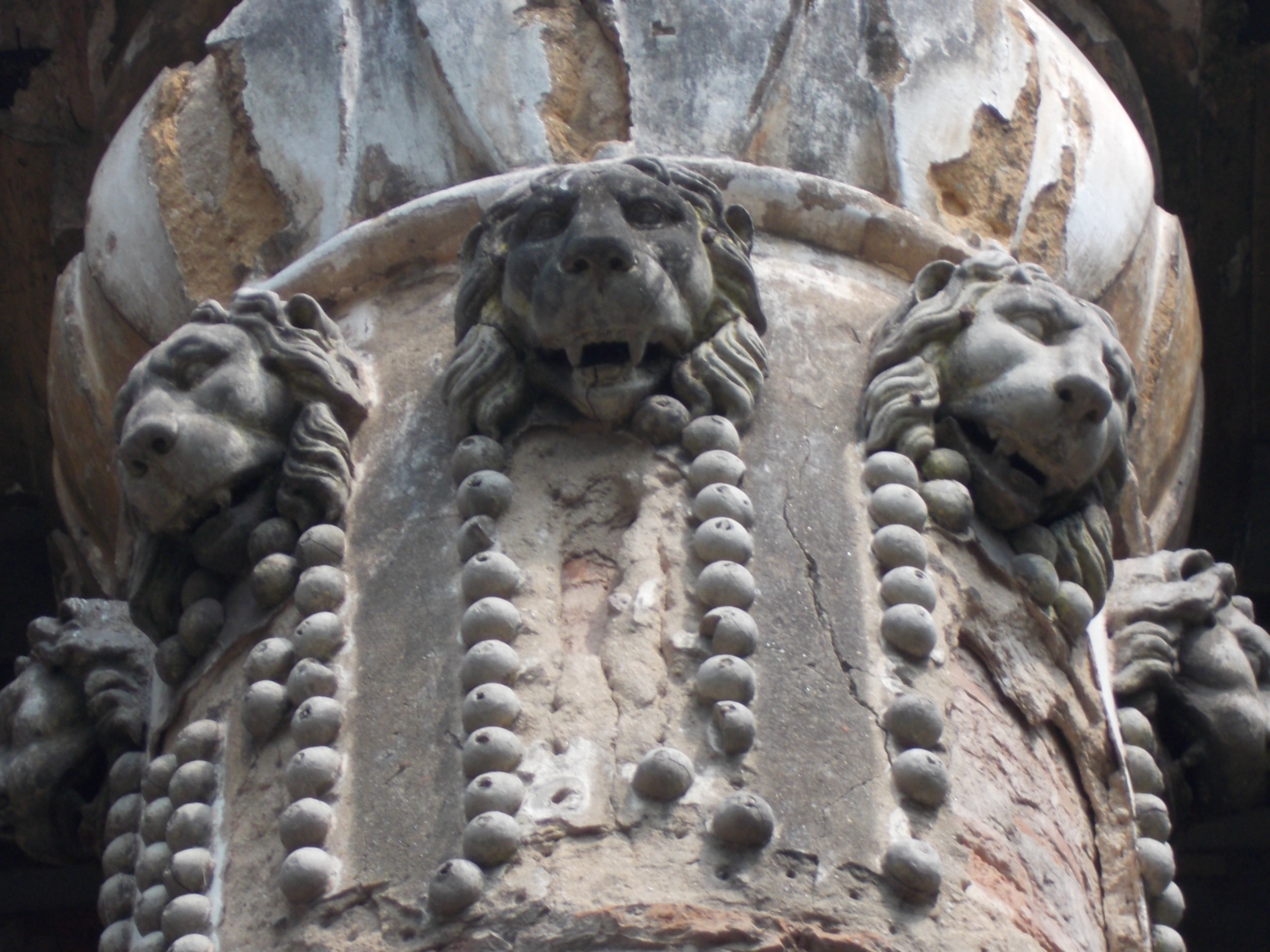
Stucco lion's heads along with rudraksha bead garlands

Nilmani Mitra, the architect behind Basu Bati, used a fusion of Bengali and Islamic architecture, which was a significant shift from the then prevalent European architecture. The design of the mansion served as a symbolic rebellion against the British Raj. The walls in Basu Bati were ornated with decorative murals and reliefs. They were painted in turquoise and amber. All the wall paintings in Basu Bati were created by Bamapada Banerjee, one of the most popular painters in 19th–century Bengal. These paintings were painted in three rows, on walls facing each other. In the thakurdalan, the columns on the ground floor are octagonal and round on the first. The house also had an adjoining garden, a private zoo and a stable, that was spread across 22 bighas, none of which exist today.

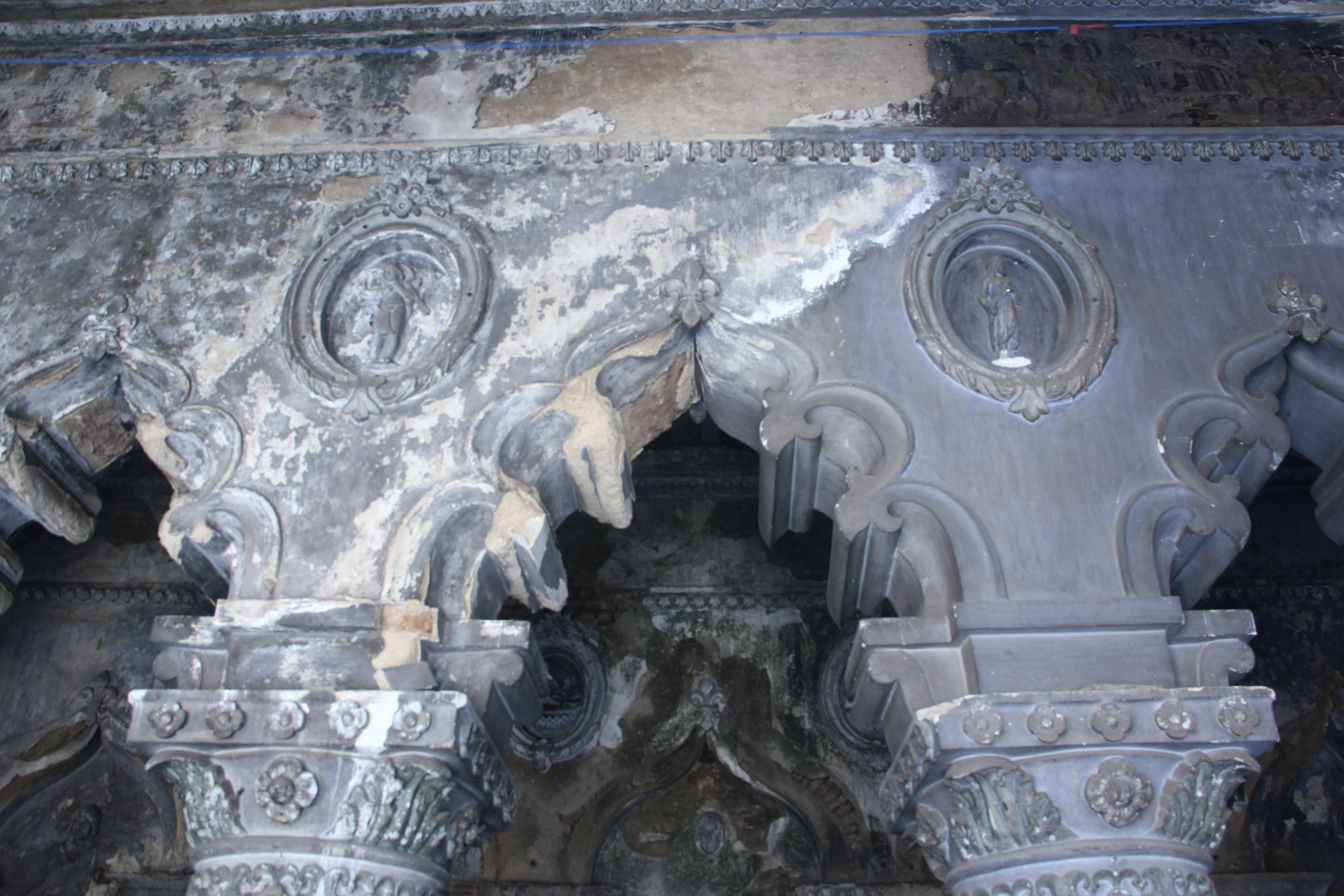
Murals, reliefs and motifs on the walls and pillars of the inner sanctum of thakurdalan

Basu Bati is faced south, according to Vastu Shastra. The southern face has 5 bays. The mansion consists of two floors spread across five alcoves. Eight columns with lion capitals flank the central bay. The corner bay has 4 columns with plain capitals. It leads to the thakurdalan, which is surrounded by rooms on its eastern, southern and western sides. All the rooms are accompanied by large balconies. The northern section of the thakurdalan has a wooden stairwell that leads to the second storey. The columns are decorated with stucco lotus motifs. The house also consists of an andar mahal, a bahir mahal and a baithakkhana. The andar mahal, located towards the north, is dedicated to the ladies of the Basu family. The then–prevalent custom of the purdah system was followed, and the only visitors allowed in these quarters were the female members of the household and close male relatives.

=== Thakurdalan ===
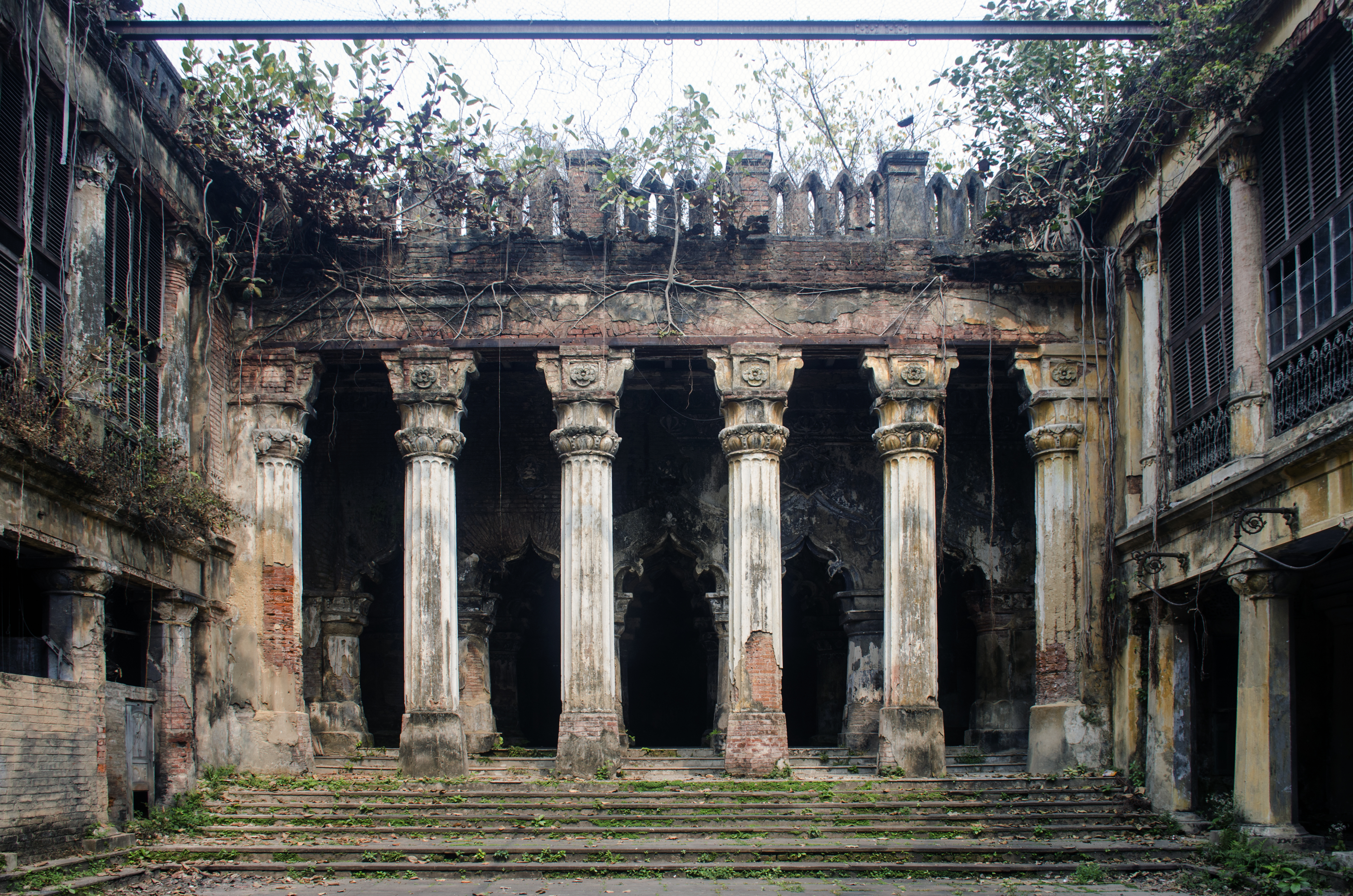
Six fluted Doric columns of the thakurdalan creating fiver inner archways

The courtyard adjoining the thakurdalan was the spot where all the celebrations and festivities took place, primarily Durga Puja and Jagaddhatri Puja. The façade of the thakurdalan consists of six large fluted Doric columns, which create five archways. Five inner archways beyond the pillars, ultimately lead to the inner sanctum. The first arch wall is ornated with Dashavatara relics. The inner walls and pillars behind the altar are adorned with stucco art, carvings, and paintings of various Hindu gods and goddesses, including Shiva, Durga, Brahma, Har-Parvati and battle scenes from the Ramayana and the Mahabharata. The ceilings in the inner portions are adorned with Kalighat patchitra paintings and Tanjore–style paintings. The floor is adorned with black and white marble tiles, resembling a chess board.

== Role in independence ==
=== Bengal Partition Movement ===
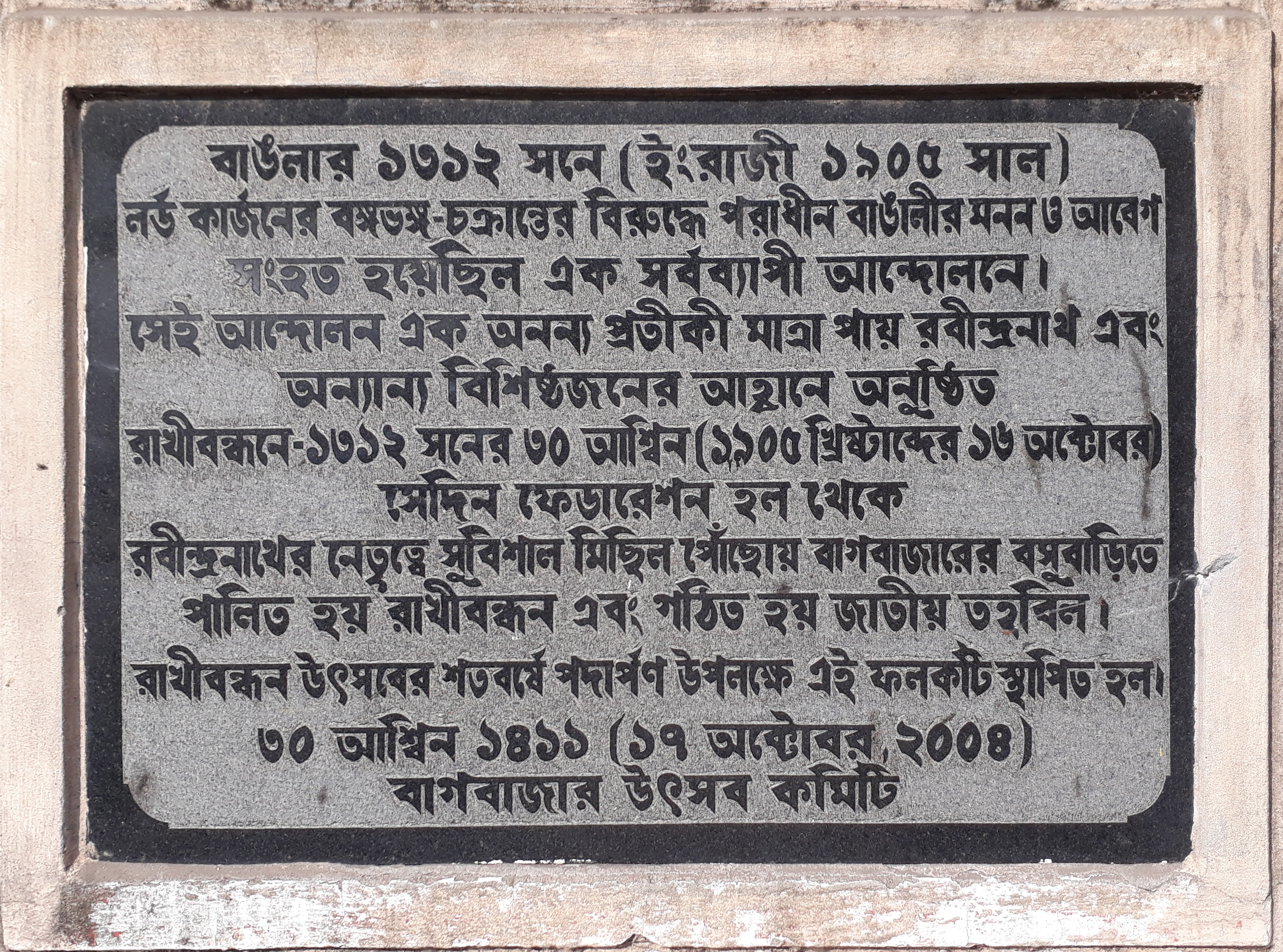
Plaque commemorating the procession of 16 October 1905 and the subsequent Rakshabandhan ceremony

Basu Bati had been a venue for many anti-British meetings and rallies held in Calcutta. Many conferences were held on the lawn of Basu Bati during the Bengal Partition Movement to protest against the Partition of Bengal by Lord Curzon in 1905. On 16 October 1905, a procession led by Rabindranath Tagore started at the Federation Hall and terminated at Basu Bati. At the end of the procession, barrister Ananda Mohan Bose was scheduled to deliver a speech. For Bose being sick, Tagore took over his place and delivered the speech that Bose had written to deliver. During the procession, Tagore sang patriotic songs and Upendrakishore Ray Chowdhury played the violin. "Bangalakshmir Bratakatha", written by Ramendra Sundar Tribedi, was read at the protest. Bengali Hindu women blew conch and sprinkled puffed rice from the rooftops when the procession passed by their houses.

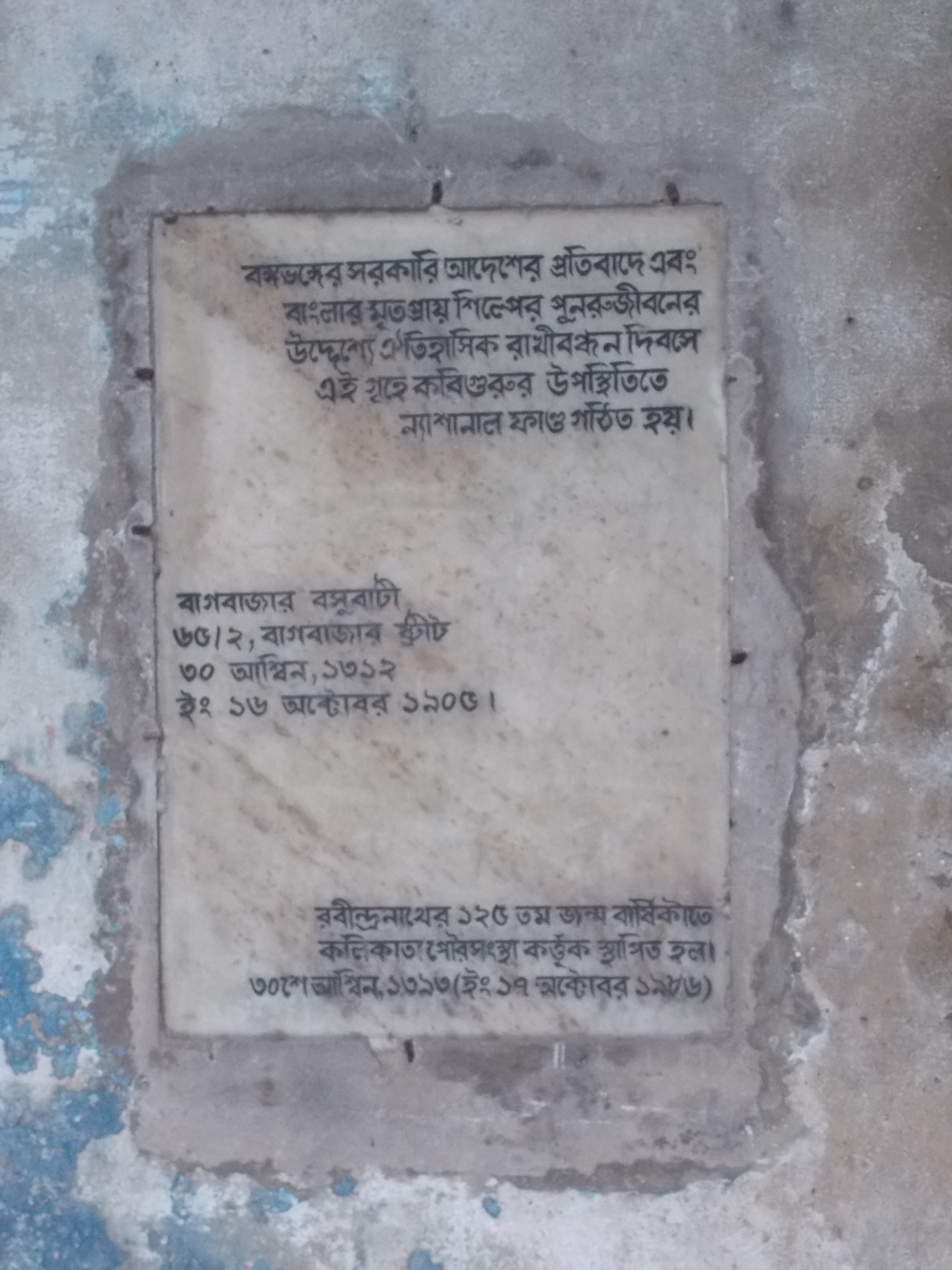
Plaque commemorating the formation of the national fund

Thereafter, a mass Rakshabandhan ceremony was conducted in the thakurdalan of Basu Bati by Tagore between the Hindus and Muslims. The ceremony served as a symbolic representation of the Hindu-Muslim unity to protest against the division of Bengal based on religious denominations. The event has been engrained in a plaque that is placed at the entrance of the mansion.

=== Swadeshi Movement ===
In August 1905, it became widespread that the British were coercing Indians to buy British textiles. After a meeting at the thakurdalan of Basu Bati, to help revive the Indian textile industry, a national fund was formed. It marked the beginning of the Swadeshi movement. Surendranath Banerjee gave the official call for the Swadeshi movement from Basu Bati. To restore people's interest in homespun clothes, an exhibition for khadi clothes was held at Basu Bati in 1906. The fund also served as an aid to students and Bengali entrepreneurs so that they could visit England for improved scientific and technical knowledge.

== Eminent visitors ==
Basu Bati was visited by eminent personalities from different fields of life. Nandalal Basu, being a religious person, Basu Bati was often visited by Ramakrishna Paramhansa and other spiritual leaders. Many playwrights and actors also visited Basu Bati, since Pashupati Basu was an art and theatre lover. Painter Jamini Roy also visited the mansion often. Girish Chandra Ghosh staged his drama "Pandav Gaurav" for Wajid Ali Shah – the last ruler of Awadh, when Shah was exiled at Metiaburuz in Calcutta. When Netaji returned from the West on 19 February 1897, he went to the Basu Bati and had his breakfast there while addressing the crowd, which had gathered to listen to his speech. Sister Nivedita was also a frequent visitor, owing to her closeness with Nandalal Basu. Sri Aurobindo stayed at Basu Bati when he came to Calcutta from Baroda. Chittaranjan Das, Sarojini Naidu and Balgangadhar Tilak included the other frequent visitors.

== Decline ==
Post–independence in 1947, like most of the mansions in India, Basu Bati also became difficult to maintain due to the abolition of the zamindari system. Ananthnath Basu, who was the youngest son of Pashupati Nath Basu's second wife, was the owner of Basu Bati during India's independence in 1947. He had married the daughter of prominent INC member Nirmal Chandra Chunder. Chunder was heavily debt-ridden post–independence. To pay off his father-in-law's debt, Ananthnath sold the eastern section of the mansion to the Government of West Bengal in 1956. In the same year, the state govt. also purchased the northern part of the andar mahal and the eastern part of the thakurdalan. Hence, the Basu family were left only with the western part of the mansion.

CM Bidhan Chandra Ray inaugurated the Ramakrishna Day Students Home on the eastern section of the mansion, owned by the state government. It provides a library, multiple reading rooms and a canteen to college students at nominal costs. On the ground floor, the rooms of the eastern section are used as offices for the Ramakrishna Day Students Home, and a large room towards the north, serves as the canteen. The library and reading rooms are located on the first floor, settled in the south-sided rooms of the eastern section.

Over time, Anathnath and his descendants moved out of the mansion. Some of Nanda Lal Basu's sons: Bipin Behari Basu and Binod Behari Basu, also moved out from Basu Bati. Hence, the ownership of Basu Bati passed to the rest of Nanda Lal’s sons: Bono Behari Basu, Banku Behari Basu and Boto Behari Basu. Further, the ownership passed on to Boto Behari Basu’s sons: Shibendra Nath Basu, Shailendra Nath Basu and Satyendra Nath Basu. Overtime, the ownership passed to Satyendra Nath Basu’s sons: Alok Basu and Amit Basu. After Alok Basu passed away in 2005, the ownership passed on to Amit Basu. In 2007-08, the last owner of Basu Bati, Amit Basu, sold the last possession of Basu Bati, the western part, to Ambuja Realty. Ambuja Realty had planned to convert the building into a heritage hotel, but the project never took off due to legal and logistical complications, since the state government had ownership of half of the property. The plan was also opposed by many historians, who proposed to turn Basu Bati into a museum. Realtor Harshavardhan Neotia mentioned in an interview that they had surveyed the building and have concluded that it can be renovated into a stable structure. They are waiting for an NOC from the KMC in order to relocate the library somewhere else and start with the renovation work.

== Ignominy ==
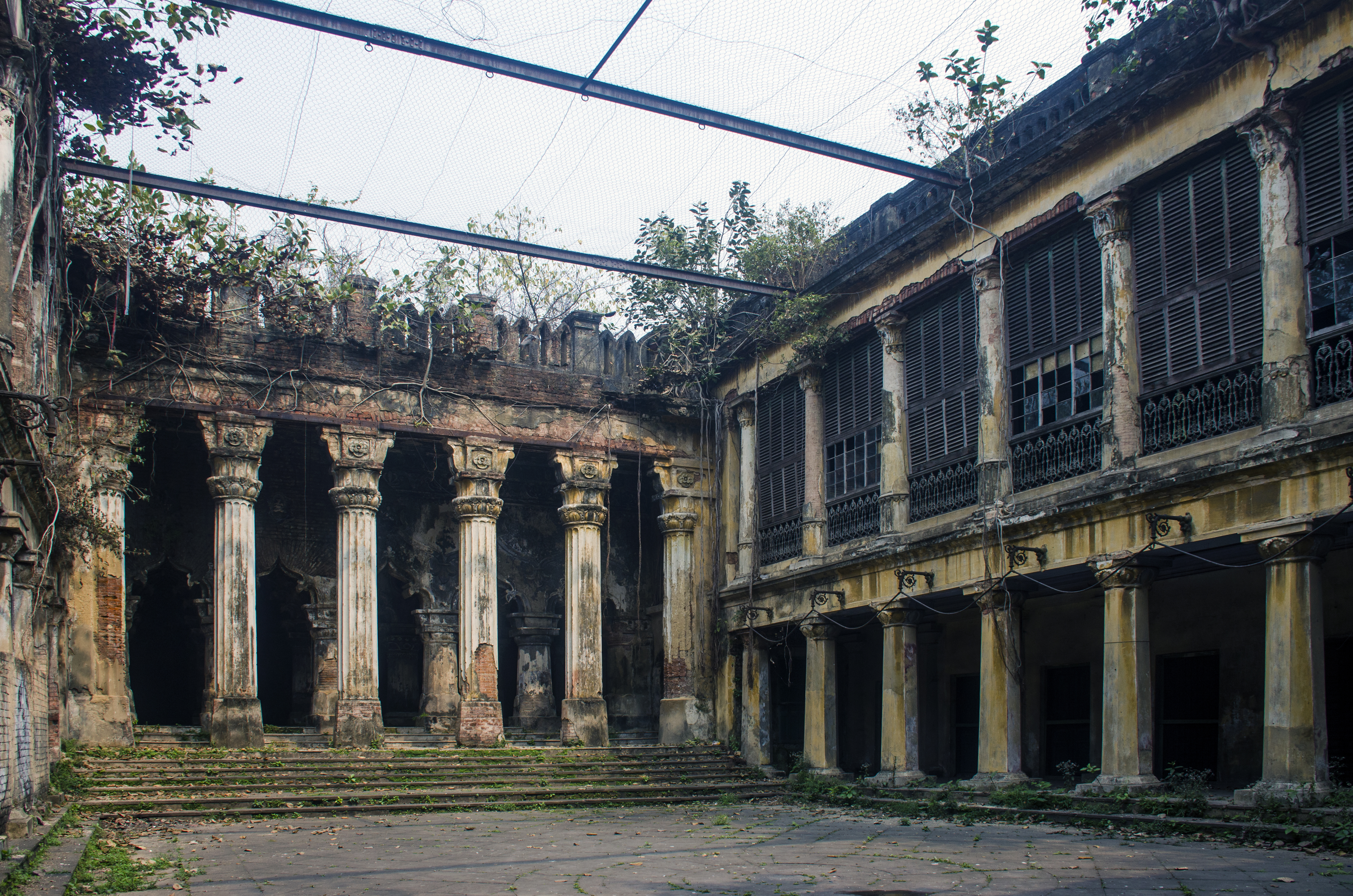
The dilapidated columns and walls of Basu Bati

The rooms beside the long corridor on the ground floor remain closed and most of the central area of the mansion is presently unapproachable owing to the lack of maintenance and disambiguated ownership. The stairs to the first floor are in a poor state. The two main rooms on the first floor, along with the corridors and balconies, are covered in dust. A few iron banisters, which were used in decoration, have gone missing. A large portion of a cornice in the courtyard had collapsed in 2013.

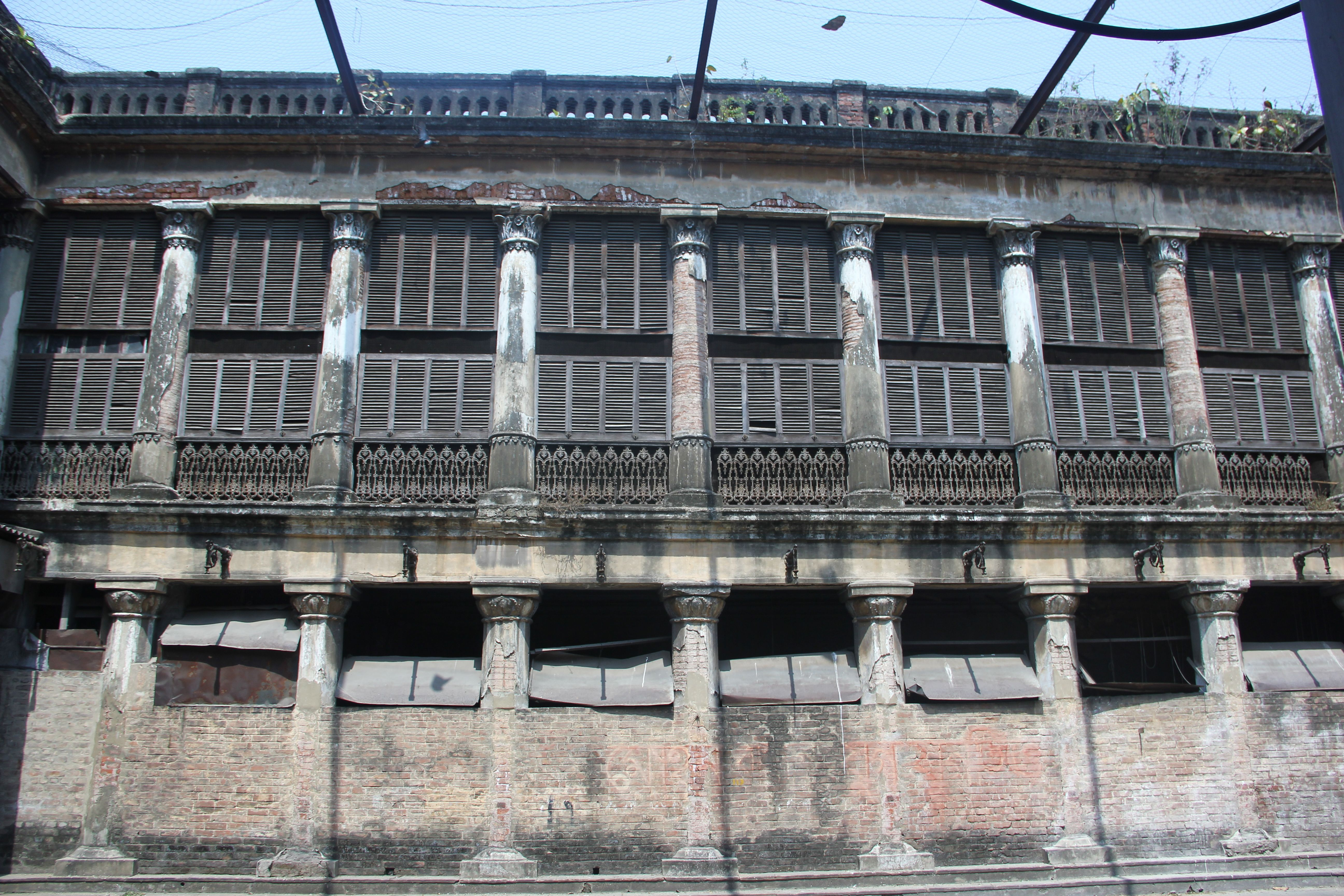
The tattered windows on the second storey

In 2004, Basu Bati was identified as an "extremely vulnerable" building by the KMC, along with 150 other old buildings.

In 2022, historians requested the Chief Minister of West Bengal, Mamata Banerjee, to preserve the structure. But officials of the Kolkata Municipal Corporation said they haven't been approached by anyone with a proper plan and proposal for the preservation of Basu Bati. They also said that a large amount of money is required to preserve the structure, and it's difficult for the corporation and state government to bear the cost since it's a partially private property."

== Legacy ==
In 2025, French artist Thomas Henriot made a 22ftx7ft artwork using golden threads, depicting the ghats of the Ganges, for the Durga Puja pandal at Hatibagan Sarbojanin, in collaboration with Bengali artist Tapas Datta. It was completed over a period of two years. The artwork featured the Durga Puja of Basu Bati and the subsequent immersion of the idols in the Ganges on Vijayadashami, after the festivities are over.

A 200 x 700 cm gold-thread tapestry, the "Palais d’Or—the Golden Palace", a large–scale ink drawing of the Basu Bati mansion, by Thomas Henriot, was displayed at the Alliance française during the France-India Year of Innovation in New Delhi in February 2026. Penny MacRae described the painting as "The seven-metre-long image was woven using a single piece of cloth. The meticulous weaving process retained the precision of the original drawing along with its rich brushstrokes. The resulting image feels three-dimensional. The colours are smoky black, streaked with gold threads. The tall shuttered windows are framed by columns, and nature has encroached, with creepers and foliage cascading thickly down the façade."

== Filmmaking venue ==
Basu Bati has become a popular shooting location for dark and supernatural films and web series, and an occasional venue for period films. Some of the films shot here include Baishe Srabon, Shob Bhooturey and Dawshom Awbotaar. Besides, many films and web series often conduct their trailer release and music album release events here.

== Nearby historical landmarks ==
Bagbazar has a rich history of colonial–era and post–independence landmarks. Historical landmarks in and around Basu Bati include the house-turned-museum of Sister Nivedita, Balaram Mandir, Mayer Bari, Bagbazar Ghat and Bichali Ghat.
