= Dighi (disambiguation) =

Dighi (Prarthana Fardin Dighi) is a Bangladeshi film actress and model.

Dighi may also refer to the following places:

- Dighi Union, a union council in Manikganj District, Bangladesh
- Dighi Port, in Agardanda, Maharashtra, India

In Bangladesh and eastern India, the word dighi refers to a reservoir (similar to the Khmer baray), often with sacred functions:

- Dibar Dighi, Naogaon District, Bangladesh
- Ghayebi Dighi Mosque, Sylhet District, Bangladesh
- Khania Dighi Mosque, Chapai Nawabganj District, Bangladesh
- Lal Dighi, Chittagong, Bangladesh
- Lal Dighi, Kolkata, India
- Laldighi Mosque, Rangpur District, Bangladesh

== See also ==
- Digi (disambiguation)
