= Bagbazar =

- Neighbourhood
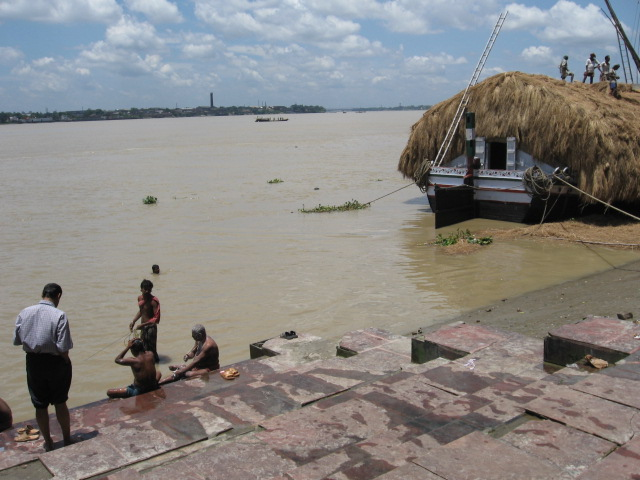
- Bagbazar Ghat on Hooghly River

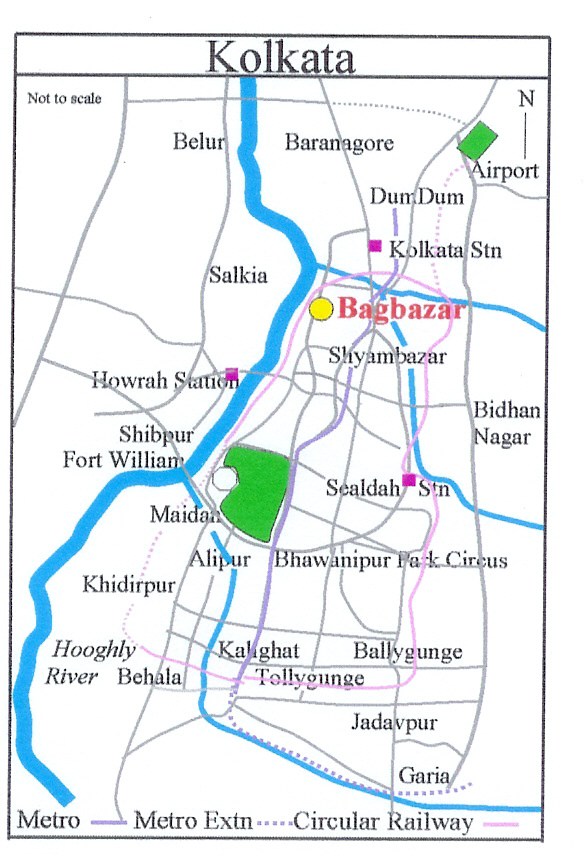

- Location in Kolkata
- Country: India
- State: West Bengal
- City: Kolkata
- District: Kolkata
- Metro Station: Shaymbazar
- Municipal Corporation: Kolkata Municipal Corporation
- KMC wards: 7, 8
- Elevation: 36 ft (11 m)

Population
  - Total: For population see linked KMC ward pages
- Time zone: UTC+5:30 (IST)
- PIN: 700003
- Area code: +91 33
- Lok Sabha constituency: Kolkata Uttar
- Vidhan Sabha constituency: Shyampukur

Bagbazar (also spelt as Baghbazar) is a neighbourhood of North Kolkata, in Kolkata district in the Indian state of West Bengal. The area, under Shyampukur police station of Kolkata Police, has been, along with neighbouring Shyambazar, the citadel of the Bengali aristocracy, in a part of what was earlier known as Sutanuti.

== Origin of name ==
The name, Bagbazar, is derived from two words put together from old Bengali literature: "bagh" meaning flower garden and "bazaar" meaning market. So it refers to a place where flowers are abundant.

== History ==
As Kalikata became settled, Sutanuti was gradually abandoned by the English as a place of residence. There remained, near its northernmost corner, Perin's Garden, a pleasure resort, where once it was the height of gentility for the British East India Company’s covenanted servants to take their ladies for an evening stroll or moonlight fete. However, it was little frequented from around 1746 and by 1752 was sold for Rs. 25,000. Captain Perin was owner of several ships. In 1754, Colonel C.F. Scott began manufacturing gunpowder at the garden.

=== Bosepara ===
Bosepara, which now forms part of Bagbazar, was set up by the Boses and Pals migrating from Hooghly district. Nidhuram Bose is believed to have arrived before the British came to Sutanuti. The Bagbazar High School is a very old school there.

=== Basu Bati ===
Basu Bati is located on the North side of Bagbazar Street. Late 19th century Bengal found this house as one of the hub for nationalist politics. Many important meetings were held in this house during the course of anti partition politics in 1904–5. The famous procession to raise protest against partition of Bengal led by Rabindranath and other eminent persons started from Federation Hall and ended at this house.

=== Bagbazar Ghat ===
Bagbazar Ghat, on the Hooghly River is an old one. It was once called Rogo Meeter's Ghat after Raghu Mitra, son of Gobindram Mitra, the zemindar, and once one of the wealthiest and most influential natives of Kolkata, in the early days of the British East India Company.

There is steamer jetty next to Baghbazar Ghat, ghat in Bengali is a paved staircase. Steamers carry passengers to the opposite bank of the river, as also the office localities around B.B.D. Bagh, Esplanade and Howrah. The old ghat is used by bathers, people collecting Ganges water for religious ceremonies, for performance of religious ceremonies, and for such mundane tasks as unloading country boats carrying various materials.

=== Battle with Siraj ===
Bagbazar has also seen battle - on 16 June 1756, a small force under Ensign Piccard repulsed an advance guard of Siraj ud-Daulah from the north, but two days later Kalikata fell in the Battle of Lal Dighi.

=== Association with Sri Ramakrishna ===
Possibly the first visit to a house in north Kolkata by Sri Ramakrishna was in 1877. He visited the ancestral house of Kalinath Bose, then numbered 40 Bosepara Lane (presently 47B, Ma Saradamani Sarani). It was here that he first met Harinath Chaterjee (later, Swami Turiyananda), Gangadhar Ghatak (Gangopadhyay) (later Swami Akhandananda) and Girish Chandra Ghosh, the noted playwright. The Ramakrishna Sarada Math is housed at 10, Ramakrishna Lane, Baghbazar.

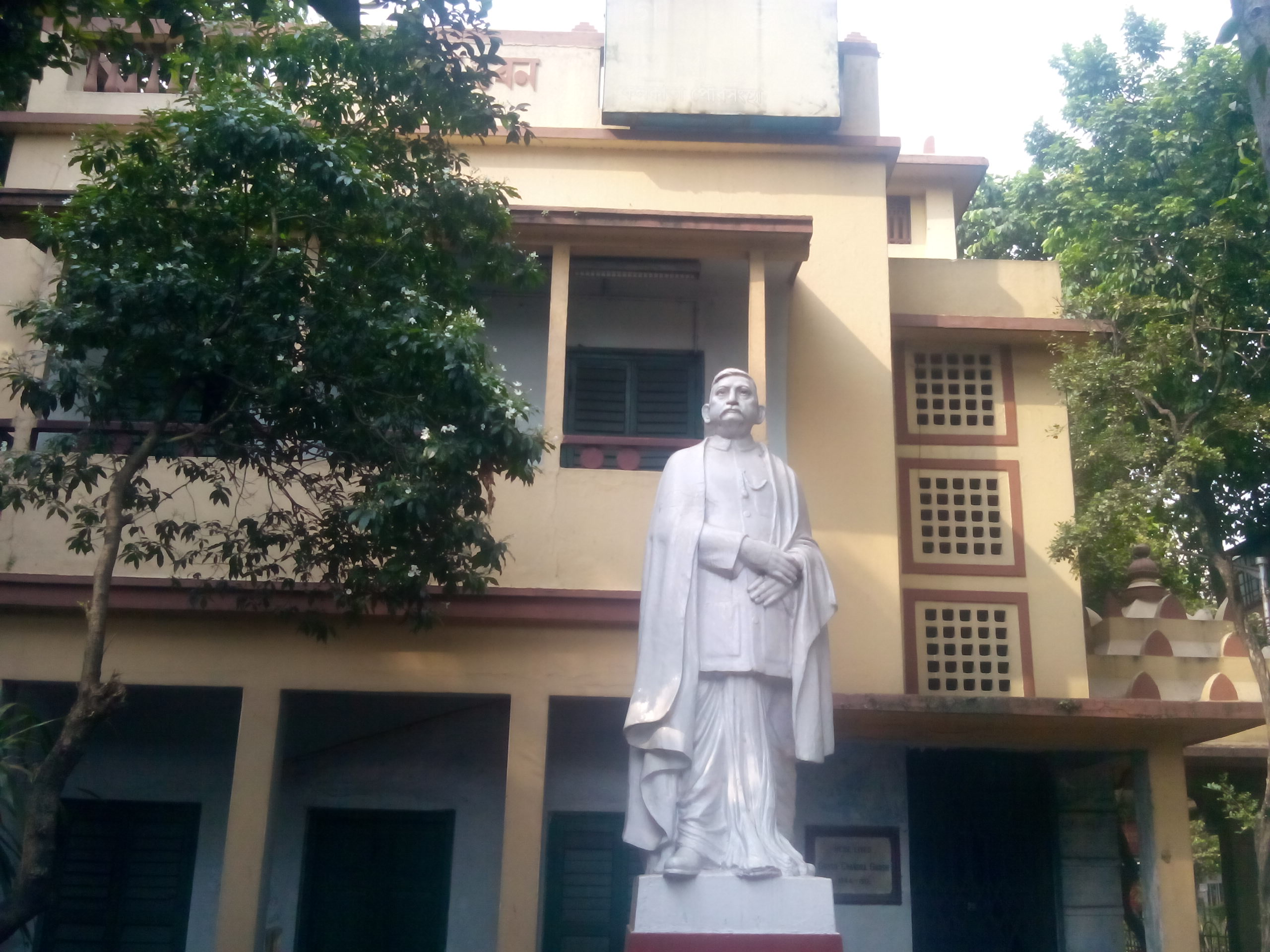
Statue of Girish Chandra Ghosh in Bagbazar

Sister Nivedita came and lived in 53/1 Bosepara Lane. "Bagbazar in the northern part of Calcutta had its own fascination for Sri Ramakrishna’s devotees. On one side stood Balaram Bose’s house, the ‘Calcutta Citadel’ of Sri Ramakrishna, where his disciples repaired for rest. On its north-east is the huge family mansion of Girish Chandra Ghosh. A little to its north was the Holy Mother's house. All these houses were encircled by the Ramkanto Bose Street and Bosepara Lane, whose very dust was trod upon by Sri Ramakrishna." She opened her school formally on 13 November 1898 at 16, Bosepara Lane, in the presence of Sarada Ma, Swami Vivekananda, Swami Brahmananda, Swami Saradanandane. The office of Udbodhan, the magazine founded by Swami Vivekananda, is also located in Bagbazar.

== Geography ==
The old Chitpur Road (renamed Rabindra Sarani) was for many years the life line of Bagbazar. It followed the same track as the old pilgrim path built by Sabarna Roy Choudhury from Halisahar to Barisha. Tram tracks along Rabindra Sarani came to Bagbazar in 1904 and being renewed in 2007. Finally Tram service closed along Rabindra Sarani in Bagbazar since 2012 due to construction of Green Line. While Rabindra Sarani cuts across Bagabazar from north to south, Bagbazar Street cuts across from Bagbazar Ghat in the west to Bidhan Sarani in the east. Girish Avenue is an extension of Chittaranjan Avenue. When it was built in the 1930s, a portion of the house of Girish Chandra Ghosh was spared and stands in the middle with the two flanges of the road on both sides of the house. There are numerous lanes and bylanes in Bagbazar.

== Culture ==
Alaler Gharer Dulal (The Rich Man's Spoilt Child) (1857) by Peary Chand Mitra has an interesting piece of women's conversation centred on Bagbazar, possibly when they went for a bath in the Hooghly River:

"Some are speaking of their oppressive sisters-in-law, some are cursing their tyrannical mothers-in-law, some are tired of life because of the kicks they receive from their daughters-in-law, particularly when their sons are too timid to intervene; some complain of the intolerable behaviour of the wives of their husband’s brothers and some say how keen they are to get their ten-year-old sons married."

Bagbazar has been home to many creative people.

Nagendranath Basu (1866 – 1938) took twenty years to edit the 22 volume Biswakosh, Bengali encyclopaedia. He lived and worked at 8 Biswakosh Lane in Bagbazar. Kolkata Municipal Corporation renamed it Biswakosh Lane. This is possibly the only road in the world named after a book.

Mohanchand Basu, who lived in Bagbazar in the 19th century and was a disciple of Nidhu Babu, introduced kheur in Bengali akhrai songs.

Bhola Maira (18th-19th century), the renowned kaviyal (verse-contestant) had a sweet-meat shop on Bagbazar Street.

Two auditoriums, side by side on Bagbazar Street, still testifies to active cultural life of Bagbazar. Girish Mancha, opened in 1986 has over 900 seats. The auditorium of Paschim Banga Jatra Akademi is next door.

However, the 125 year-old Bagbazar Reading Library is not in good shape because of paucity of funds.

Bagbazar Durga Puja continues to an important tourist attraction for the area.

== Transport ==
Buses ply along Rabindra Sarani, Girish Avenue (Khirode Vidyavinode Avenue) and Bagbazar Street in Bagbazar. Shyambazar 5-Point crossing is also located nearby.

Bus routes

- S-21 (Baghbazar - Garia)
- S-45 (Baghbazar - Shakuntala Park)
- S-2B (Baghbazar - Ballygunge)
- 240 (Baghbazar - Golf Green)
- 240/1 (Baghbazar - Garia Stn)
- 242 (Cossipore - Esplanade)
- 43 (Dakshineswar - Esplanade)
- 93 (Baghbazar - Kharibari)
- 79B (Baghbazar - Barasat)
- S-17A (Dakshineswar - Kudghat)

Bagbazar (Khirode Vidyavinode Avenue) is connected to Chitpur and Cossipore (Cossipore Road/Sri Sri Ramakrishna Paramahansa Dev Sarani) with Chitpur Bridge over a canal. The bridge was firstly inaugurated in 1937.

Bagbazar railway station on Kolkata Circular Railway line serves the locality. Kolkata Station, one of the major railway hub stations of the city, is also located nearby.

== Gallery ==
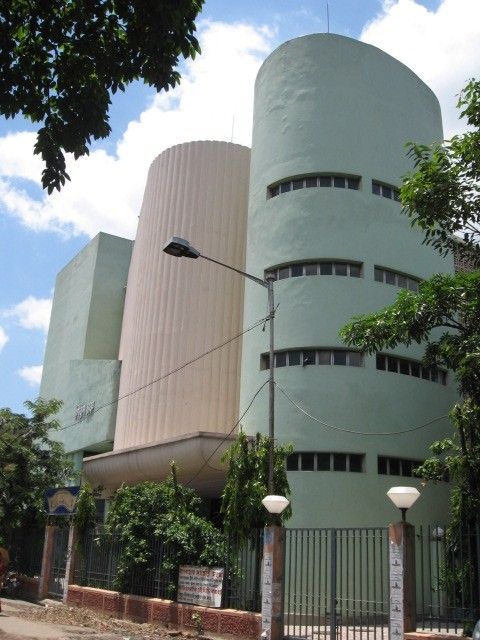
Girish Mancha

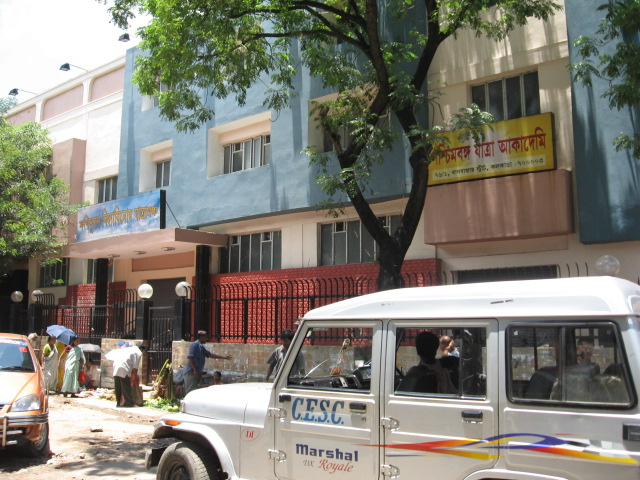
Auditorium of Paschim Banga Jatra Akademi

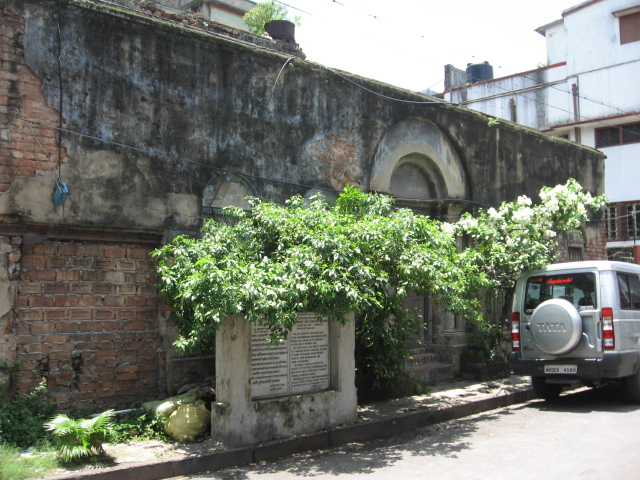
House where Sister Nivedita started her school in 1898

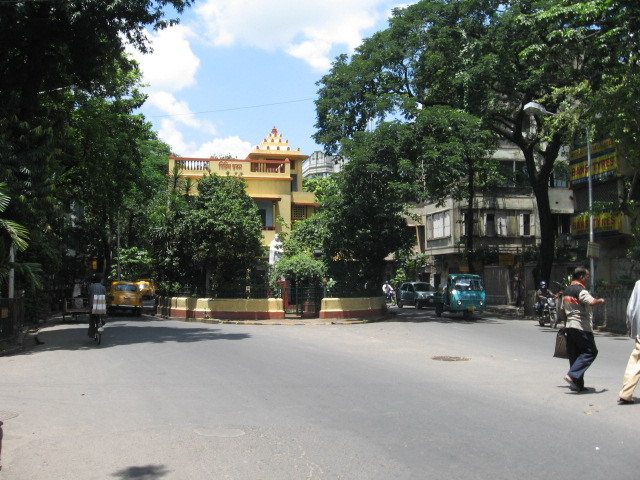
Girish Avenue. At the time of the construction of the road, a portion of the house of Girish Chandra Ghosh was left in the middle.

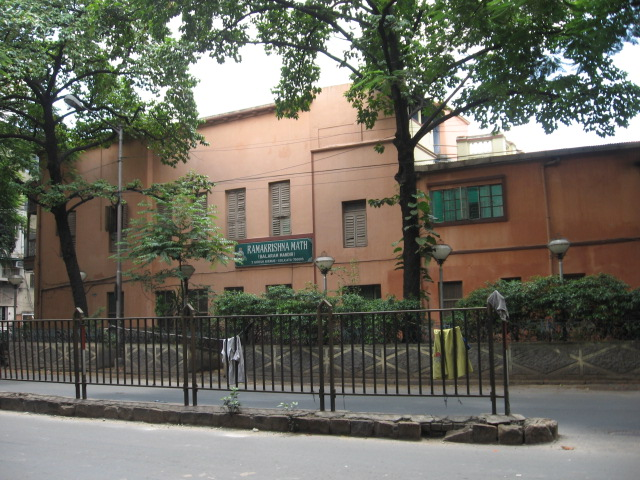
House of Balaram Bose, now Ramakrishna Math

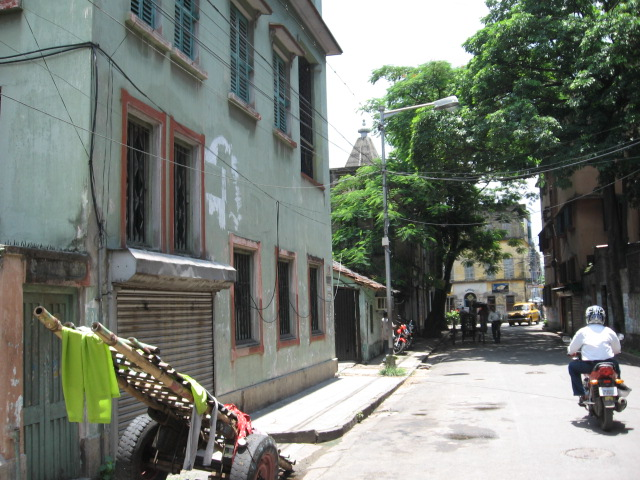
Bosepara Lane in Bagbazar

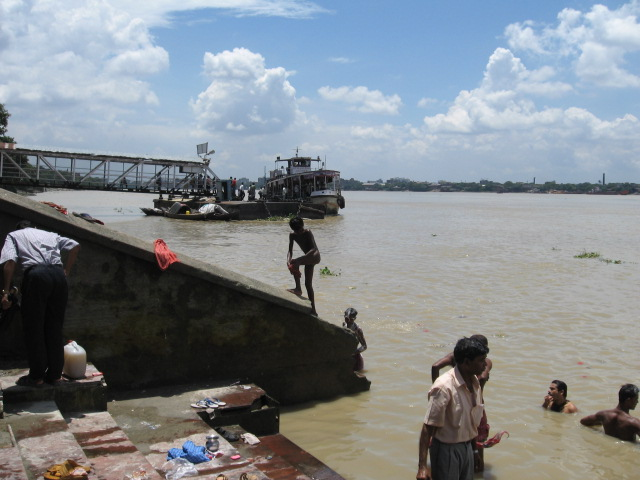
The Steamer Jetty as seen from Bagbazar Ghat

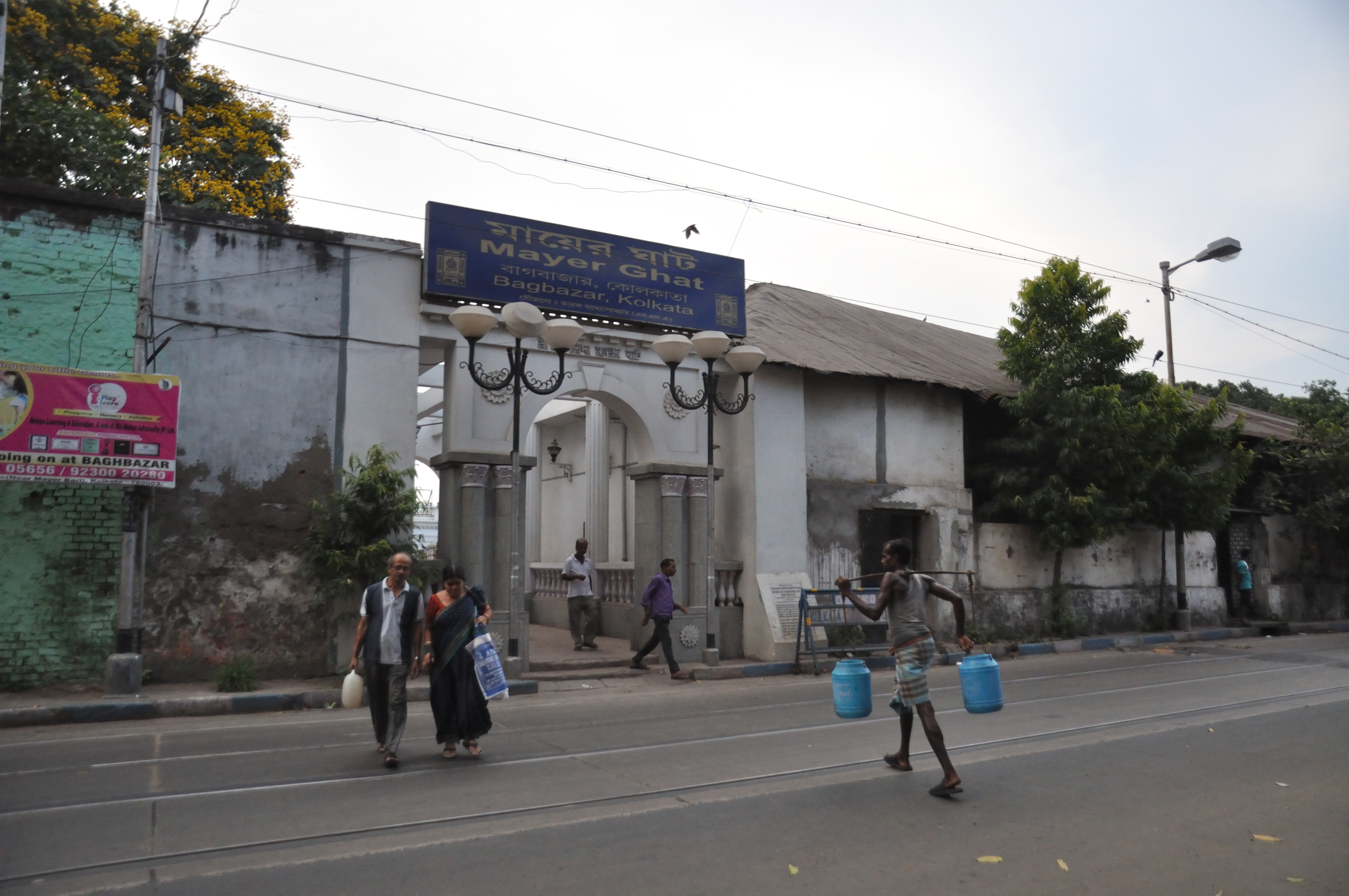
Mayer Ghat Entrance on Rabindra Sarani, Bagbazar

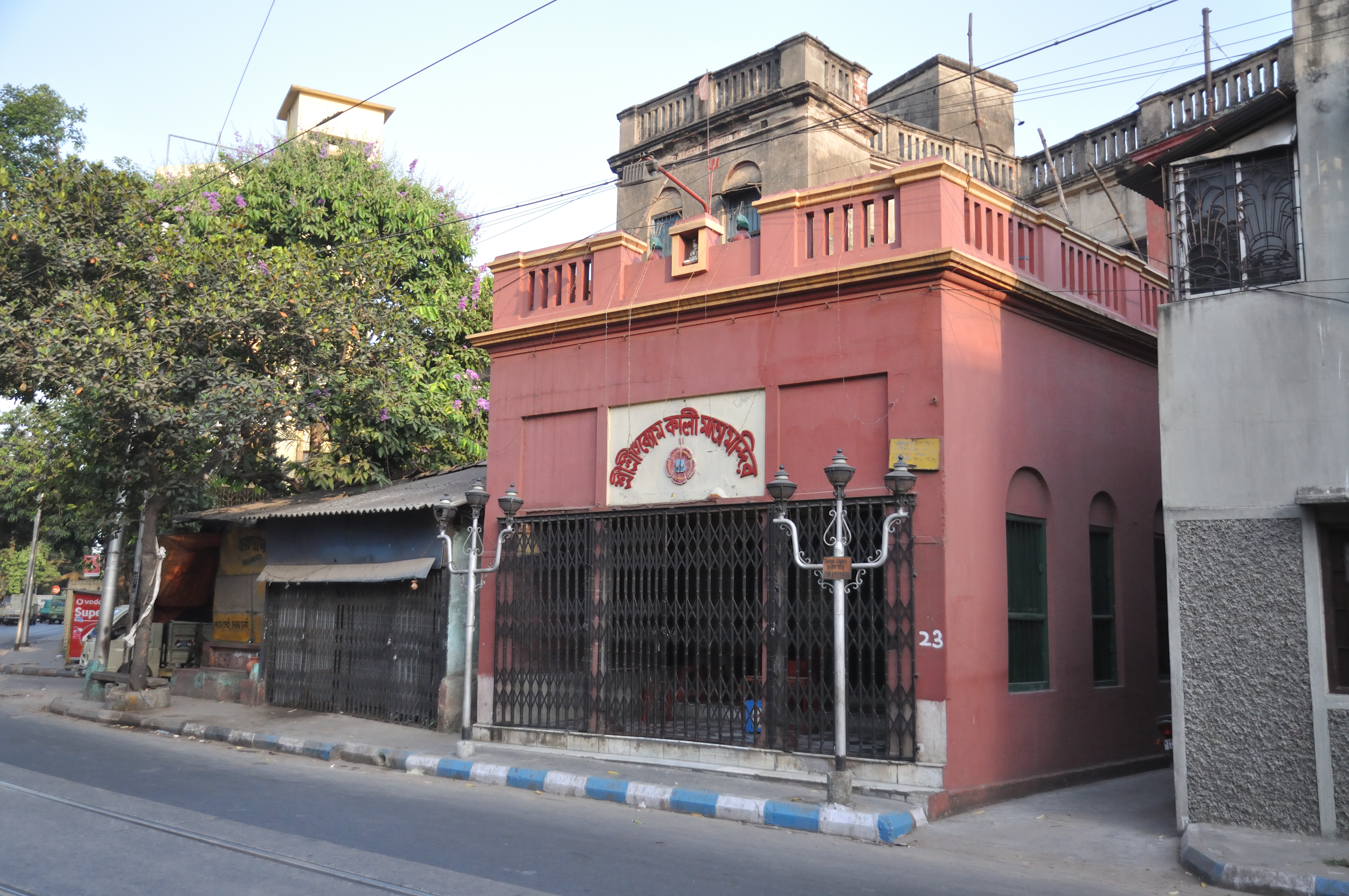
Bom Kali Mandir on Rabindra Sarani, Baghbazar

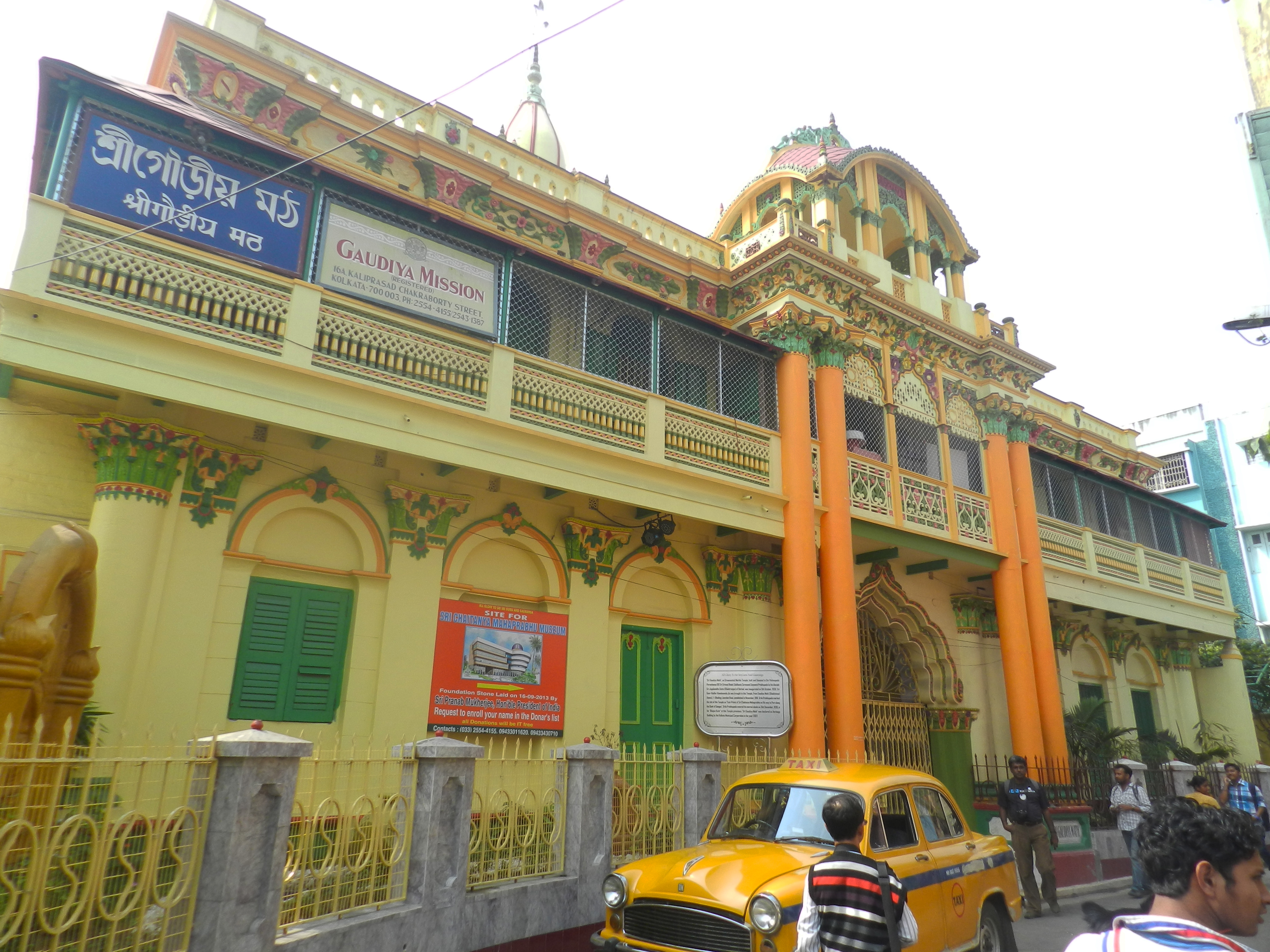
Gaudiya Math, Bagbazar

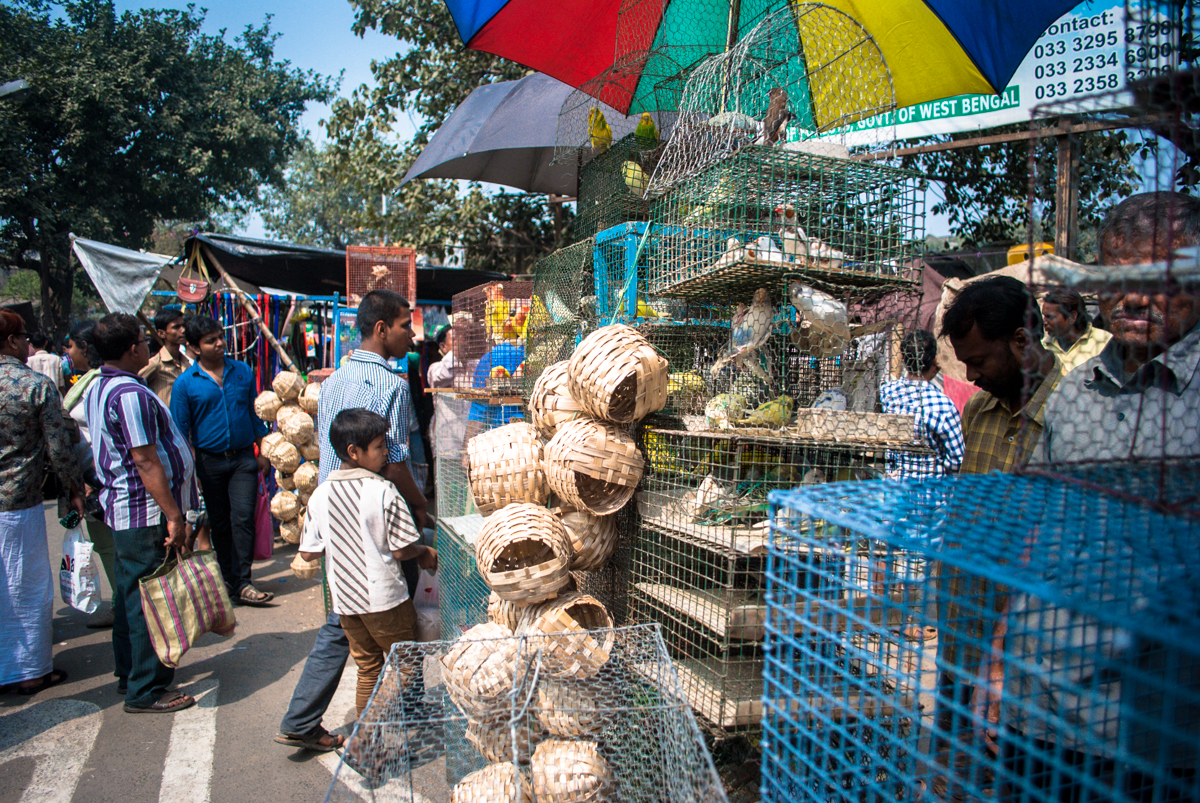
Galiff Street Bird Market, Bagbazar

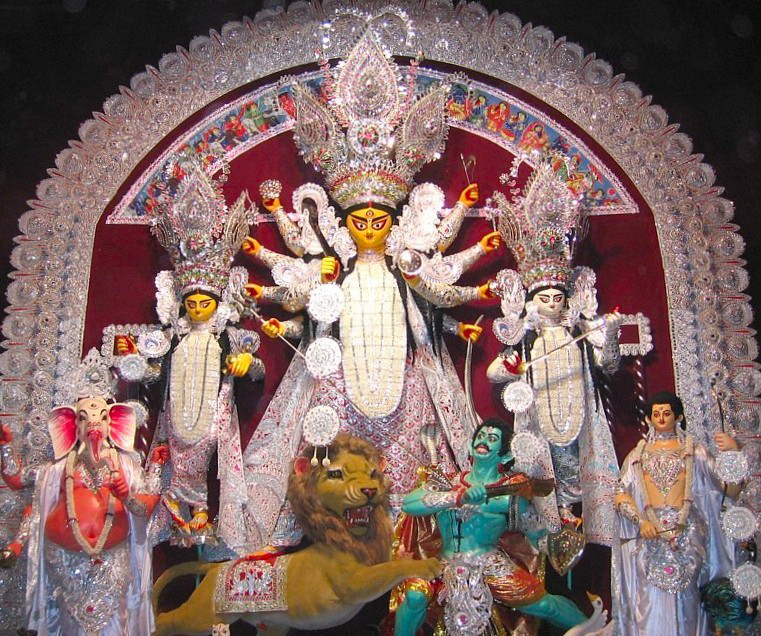
Durga Puja at Bagbazar which was started in the year 1918

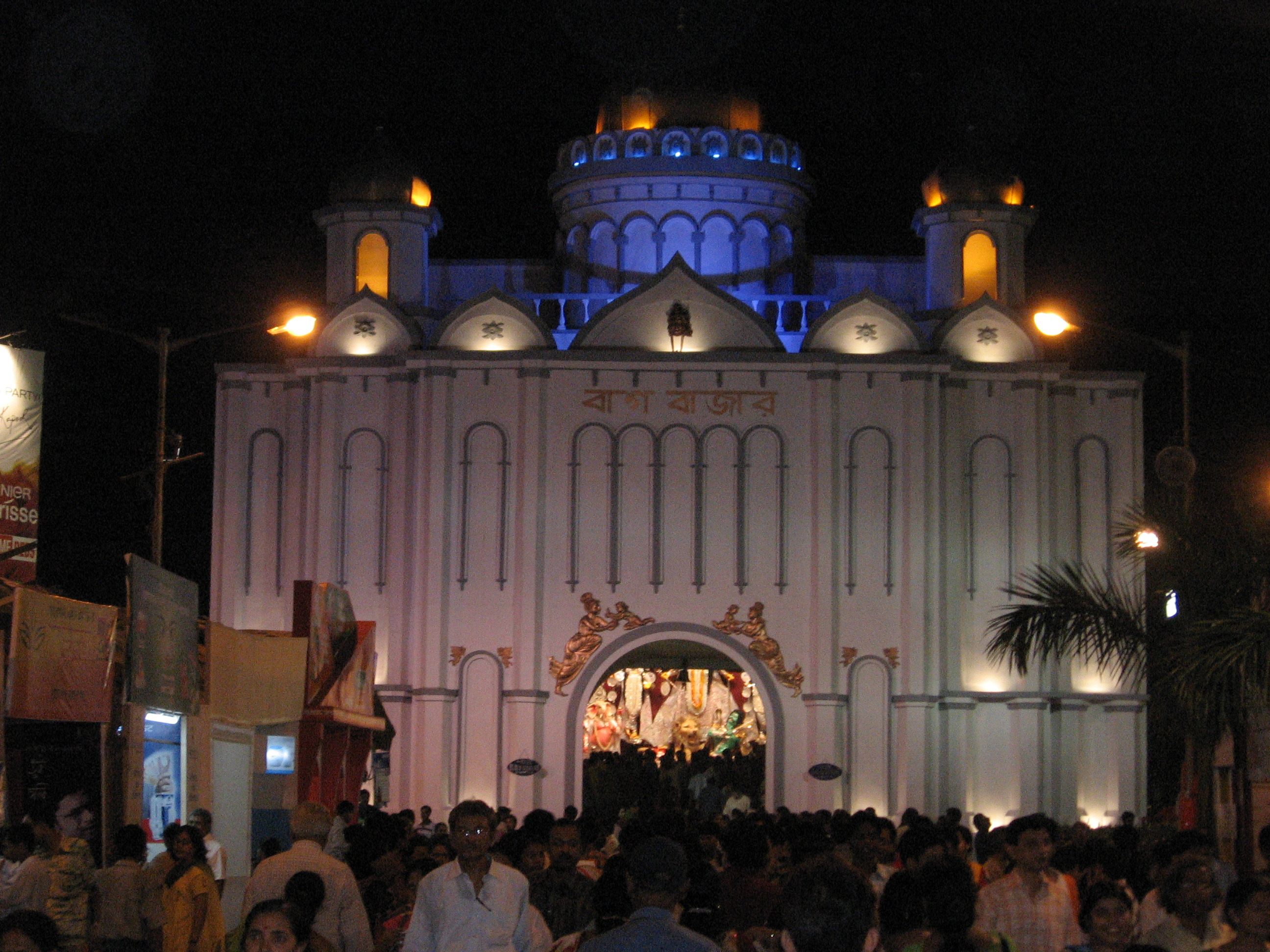
Exterior decoration and lighting for Durga Puja 2006 - one of the earliest Barowari Pujas in Kolkata

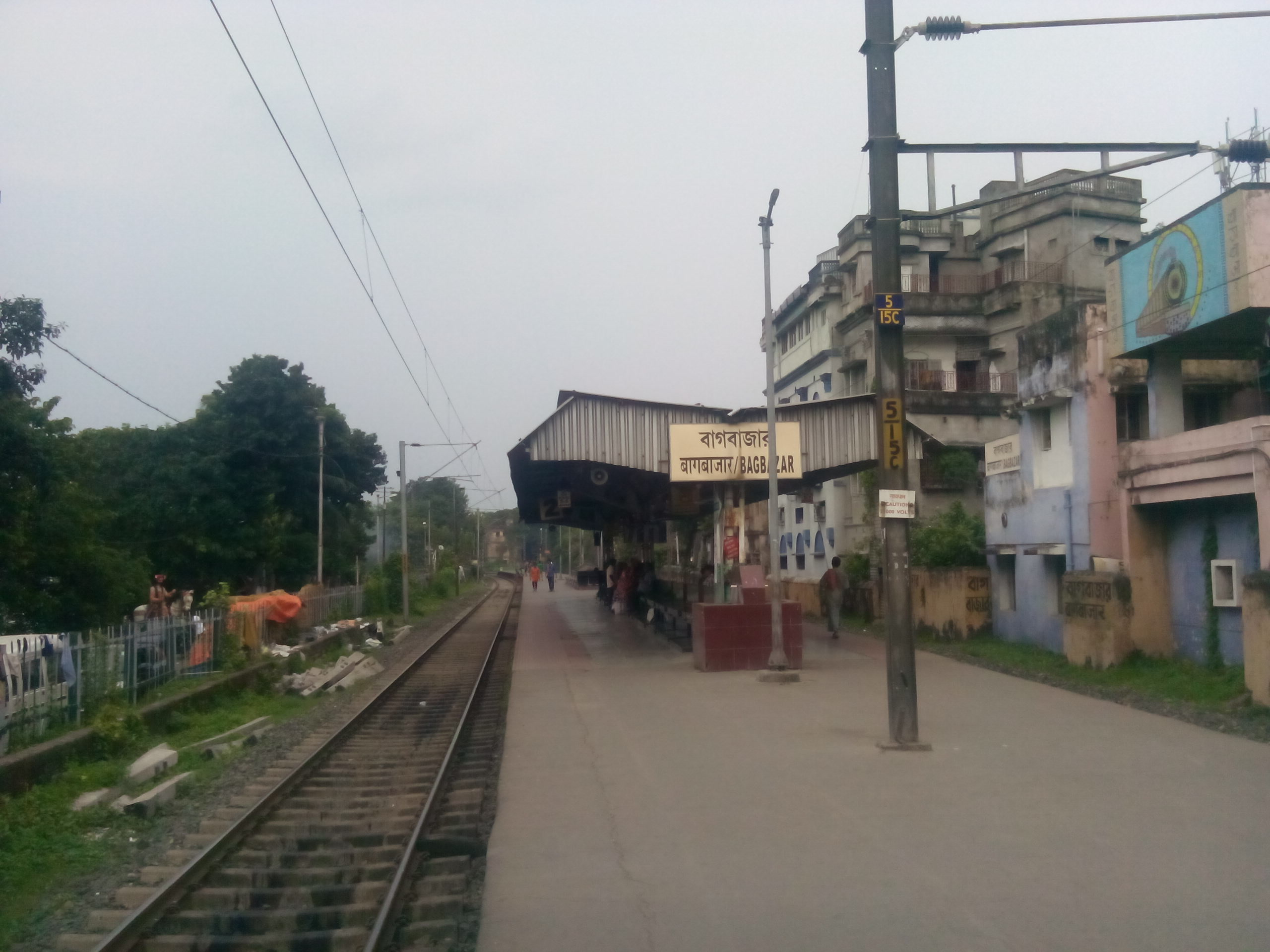
Bagbazar railway station
