= Teak in Myanmar =

Valuable natural resource

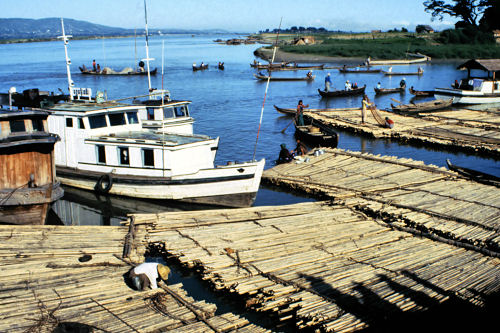
Rafted teak logs on the Irrawaddy River

Teak, tectona grandis, is a hardwood tree native to much of South and Southeast Asia, including Myanmar. Due to its natural water resistance, teak is sought out for a variety of uses including furniture-making and shipbuilding. Teak grows throughout much of Myanmar, but was first exploited in the Tenasserim (now Tanintharyi) region in the southeast of Burma on the Malay Peninsula. Though it has long been used by locals, teak has been important to the economy of Myanmar since British colonization.

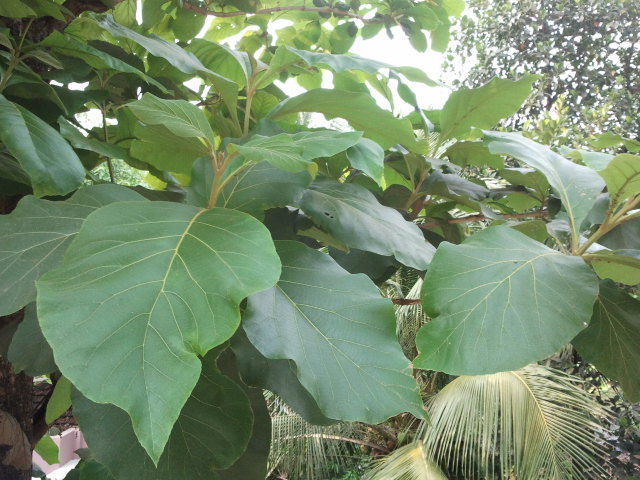
Leaves of Tectona grandis

== Ecology ==
Teak is indigenous to much of Myanmar, Laos, Thailand and parts of India. In Myanmar, it is naturally found in areas between the 25°30'N and 10°N lines of latitude. Teak mostly grows in hilly areas below 900 metres (3,000 ft) in elevation. Within the country, teak is most common in mixed deciduous forests as well as evergreen and semi evergreen forests. In the south of Myanmar, major teak forests existed in the Pegu and Tenasserim Hills. Other notable areas of teak growth include the Arakan Mountains in the west of the country and the Shan Hills in the East.

While teak is still abundant in many of these locations, native forests have been significantly threatened in the late twentieth century. In the 1990s, the Myanmar state attempted to increase revenue by cutting more teak. This uptick in logging increased deforestation throughout the country, of which the Pegu Hills were particularly affected.

== History ==
=== Beginning of Colonial Rule ===
In the nineteenth century, the British Empire was the largest naval power in the world. As such, they were in constant need of shipbuilding supplies, including teak. After its victory in the First Anglo-Burmese War in 1826, Britain found in its newly conquered Burmese territory an ample source of teak. Extracting this resource, however, proved a puzzle. Though the British Government had initially held a monopoly over all Burmese teak, in 1829 it chose to open it up to private industry. This move was supposedly made to ensure the harvest and sale of sufficient wood, but in reality was a surrender by the government to well-connected timber merchants. Entrepreneurs of all types flocked to Tenasserim to make their fortunes from teak. The government imposed few rules on these loggers and by 1841 they had exhausted the majority of teak stocks in the region. In response to this over-harvesting, the colonial rulers of Burma chose to take more direct control of teak exploitation. The British colonial government would not take a laissez faire, hands off approach to teak management again.

=== Reforming Teak Exploitation ===
In 1841 the first Superintendent of Forests for Tenasserim was appointed. This appointment represented a change from indiscriminate to considered teak exploitation in Burma. Other areas with major teak stocks, such as the Pegu (now Bago) Hills, were placed under the control of the British Government. However, even though, on paper, the British government owned the land the teak was situated on, it did not necessarily control it. Taking control of this land conveniently dovetailed with a particular method of teak cultivation. This method was shifting cultivation or taungya. Taungya is the practice of removing the teak from stretches of forest, burning the remainder, planting teak and other crops in their place and nurturing both together until the teak is mature enough to grow on its own, at which point another section of forest can be started on. This practice meant that the laborers who planted teak and tended crops would be strongly tied to the British colonial authorities, from whom they received salaries. In addition to creating a British presence in the lives of locals, taungya was quickly taken up due to being cheaper than the creation of teak plantations.

=== Resistance by the Karen ===
Early efforts to introduce taungya to Burmese teak productions started in the Pegu Hills, between the Irrawaddy and Sittaung rivers in central Burma. The people that the British imagined would implement their taungya system of teak cultivation were ethnic Karens who had been residents of the region for generations without incorporation into the lowland Burman culture. Avoidance of the lowland has long been key to the identity and survival of the Karen people. Some, like the political scientist James C. Scott, argue that Karen civilization has been carefully organized with the goal of lessening the influence of the dominant empire of the time, be it Burmese or British This tendency often meant that Karens choose to live in upland areas where they would be out of immediate reach of such states. Given this heritage, many Karen living in the Pegu Hills were reluctant to integrate themselves into the taungya system that the British devised. In addition to opposing it for the political power it gave the British, they found the practice of a form of agriculture unpracticed by their fore-bearers culturally threatening.

While the taungya system of simultaneously growing teak and other crops was espoused by the British, shifting cultivation was and has remained the norm in Burma. Due to its precolonial roots and perceived inefficiencies, it is often characterized as backwards. However, some scholars find this assessment to be flawed given the political independence that it gave to its practitioners While the taungya system did entail shifting cultivation, it ran counter to the goals of the Karen. The initial steps of logging and burning meant the destruction of the native forest. The forest, along with the hills, naturally isolated the Karen from the rest of Burma. Taungya also meant that the British or their agents would return to the previously cut areas after some years to harvest the newly planted teak. This increased traffic through their territory would also impact their secluded status. Given their suspicion of the lowland states they were isolated from, the British included, the Karen were reluctant to lose this protection.

=== Implementation of Taungya ===
Because the Karen were more interested in maintaining their independence than uniting economically with the British, the implementation of Taungya required the use of force. The British government seized on the fact that the Karen had no legal title to the land that they occupied, and had occupied for generations. Teak tracts in the Pegu Hills were pronounced state property. The government also made it illegal to burn or damage teak trees within these forests. This law effectively criminalized traditional Karen agricultural practices. Due to the wide distribution of teak in the Pegu Hills, almost any location that a Karen farmer could choose to clear would contain some trees. The British government now found itself in a position to fine or prosecute most of the people living in the area. However, the new laws were difficult to enforce. Breakage was rampant and the British criminal justice system was underfunded and ineffectual. It took until 1869 for a concrete and successful push to implement taungya to be made. At this point, the colonial government, tired of Karen resistance, began to make deals with villages promising them plots of land for permanent cultivation in return for their labor in the taungya system. This arrangement was a major concession for Karen villagers as it entailed abandoning the shifting cultivation they had traditionally practiced.

=== Transition from Taungya to the Myanmar Selection Systems ===
Almost directly on the heels of taungya came another form of teak exploitation. This system, which eventually came to be known as the Myanmar Selection System reduced the British Empire's dependency on the local Karen people. This method entails dividing an area of forest into thirty sections of roughly equal area, one of which is logged every thirty years. However, to put this system into place, the colonial government needed greater control of the forest than the taungya system entailed. To do so, in 1870, the British government created the first enclosure that prevented natives from cutting teak and other woods. Without locals interfering with teak and other woods, the government was free to enact new forestry policies. By 1879 it had reserved 1,410 square miles (3,700 km^{2}) of forest.

Between the 1870s and the 1930s, the taungya system became less and less supported as a method for harvesting teak. In 1885, the British Empire won the Third Anglo-Burmese War and took control of Upper Burma. Control of this region gave the Empire access to an even larger supply of teak. However, taungya was not the most effective manner to exploit this newly acquired bounty. Most of Upper Burma was remote, and the British Forest Department did not have the resources to administer the taungya systems in the area. Instead the government selectively felled teak without the providing continuous employment for locals. Taungya also suffered in the Pugu Hills. As the British consolidated their control of Burma, they depended less and less on the cooperation of the Karen people to retain their power. Therefore, they were able offer less beneficial terms to taungya practitioners. Over time, this led to a decline in its use among Karen in the Pegu Hills.

=== Consequences for the Karen People ===
While the Karen people of the Pegu Hills had initially been unwilling to adopt the taungya system, increased enclosure and agreements with British Colonial authorities meant that by the 1890s most Karen had no choice but to adapt. These same people came to feel left in the lurch when the British Government began to shift its focus to cheaper and less labor-intensive methods of teak extraction in Upper Burma. Karen who had bought into the taungya system felt sold out when they could no longer count on the government to pay them for their compliance. Those who had avoided adopting the system and continued shifting cultivation found that most was either under permanent cultivation or taungya. These feelings were heightened when taungya was phased out in 1935.

=== Privatization of Teak Extraction ===
In the twentieth century, private enterprise, which had been discouraged since the disaster in the Tenasserim region, was allowed back into the teak trade. Several companies, of which the largest was the British Bombay Burmah Trading Corporation Limited leased teak forests from the British government and felled them using the Myanmar Selection System. These new companies cut teak at a much faster rate than the government had in the nineteenth century and sped up even more after World War I. Many European timber merchants were able to influence Forest Department policy, which left out native Burmans, who did not enjoy the same connections. The British Forest Department also preferentially awarded contracts to European traders and companies. This meant that most of the valuable teak leases in Burma were sold to outsiders.

=== Burmese People's Response ===
There was strong Burmese pushback against the international exploitation of teak and its negative effects on locals. This is evidenced by several failed attempts by Burmese politicians to change British forestry policy with respect to teak and other woods. One of the effects of the enclosure policies that the Forestry Department had adopted was that local villagers were no longer allowed to cut their own firewood for free, as they had for generations. Burmese nationalist politicians attempted to convince the colonial Legislative Council of Burma to expand local's rights to free forest products in 1926. This effort, however, was voted down.

In 1937, under the Government of Burma Act, Burma was administratively separated from the colony of India. While this theoretically would give the Burmese people a greater ability to govern themselves, the powers they gained were limited Burmese did become more represented in the formally predominantly European Forest Service, making up about one quarter in 1942. Native Burmans took more control over the Forest Service during the Japanese occupation, as all British officials were forced to flee the country.

=== Independence ===
Since Burma received independence in 1948, teak has been a major economic resource for all of its governments. However, it took some time for the government to attain the kind of control of the teak trade that the British colonial state had. World War II and its aftermath left the new Burman government with little control over much of its territory, or forests. However, due to the lucrative nature of the teak trade, Prime Minister U Nu's Forestry Department resumed cutting teak as soon as practicable.

=== Socialist Rule and Nationalization ===
During the years of socialist rule in Burma, teak was an important part of the economy. Nationalization of timber in Burma led to the creation of a new State Timber Board, controlled by Ne Win, the Burman socialist head of state. While other industries declined during this period, the teak trade was one of the only major sources of funds for the government. In the early 1980s one third of national export earnings came from teak. To make up for decreased rice exports, the State Timber Board encouraged greatly increasing teak production. This new demand led to destructive extraction practices in easily accessible areas, like the southern Pegu hills. Burma became even more dependent on the teak trade after the State Law and Order Restoration Council (SLORC) (later known as the State Peace and Development Council (SPDC)) took power from Ne Win in 1988. In need of money to purchase military equipment in case of more uprisings like the one that led to deposition of Ne Win, the government had little choice but to cut more and more teak. The frequency of cutting within the Myanmar Selection System was increased and with it the rates of forest degradation and deforestation.

=== Thai Logging Concessions and the KNU ===
Neighboring Thailand had been not regulated teak extraction as robustly as Burma or its British rulers, and by 1988 suffered from major deforestation. Thai timber companies no longer had sources of teak within their own country and needed new resources to exploit to stay viable. The state in Myanmar responded by selling them permission to log in territory controlled by the militant Karen National Union (KNU). The KNU was a longtime antagonist of the Myanma state that had been able to thrive due to its inaccessible location near the Thai border, as well as its connections to cross-border smuggling. The Thai logging and the infrastructure it would bring to the area considerably diminished the KNU's strategic advantage. In addition to weakening the KNU, Thai loggers also replicated the deforestation and ecological damage that they had wreaked in their own country.

=== Teak in the Twenty-First Century ===
The process of democratization in Myanmar has brought reforms to the logging industry as well. In an attempt to preserve existing forests from the rampant logging of the 1990s, the government banned the export of raw timber laws in 2014. Being that the vast majority of teak from Myanmar was sold in this format, this action largely amounts to a ban on teak exports. However, even the ban has not been totally successful in preventing forest degradation. Illegal loggers, many of them Chinese, have continued to cut teak in remote areas of the Kachin State, near the Chinese border. The Myanmar government has attempted to discourage this practice by meting out draconian punishments to captured loggers. In 2015, 153 Chinese loggers were given life sentences for illegal logging. Since the 2021 Myanmar coup d'etat, teak smuggling increased. However, the KNU and Thailand's Department of National Parks, Wildlife and Plant Conservation collaborate to stem the flow along the Salween River.

== Sources ==
- Bryant, Raymond L. The Political Ecology of Forestry in Burma: 1824 - 1994. Honolulu: University of Hawai`i Press, 1997.
- Bryant, Raymond L. “Shifting the Cultivator: The Politics of Teak Regeneration in Colonial Burma.” Modern Asian Studies, vol. 28, no. 2, 1994, pp. 225–250. https://www.jstor.org/stable/312886.
- Gyi, Ko Ko and Tint, Kyaw. 1995. Management status of natural teak forests. In: Teak for the Future - Proceedings of the Second Regional Seminar on Teak, Yangon, Myanmar, 29 May - 3 June 1995. Bangkok, Thailand: FAO Regional Office for Asia and the Pacific (RAP).
- Mon, Myat Su, Nobuya Mizoue, Naing Zaw Htun, Tsuyoshi Kajisa, and Shigejiro Yoshida. Factors Affecting Deforestation and Forest Degradation in Selectively Logged Production Forest: A Case Study in Myanmar. Forest Ecology and Management, 267 (March 1, 2012): 190–98, 191
