= Digi.no =

Norwegian online newspaper

- Website type: Online newspaper
- Available in: Norwegian
- Owner: Teknisk Ukeblad Media
- Website: digi.no
- Commercial: Yes
- Launched: 1996

Digi.no is a Norwegian online newspaper covering news within information technology and telecommunications. It is published in Oslo by Teknisk Ukeblad Media. The publication has eight journalists. The editor in chief is Ida Oftebro. When Digi was founded in August 1996 it was the first completely online newspaper in Europe.

In 2000 the site changed its name to digitoday.no, and was planning to establish a news service in other Nordic and European countries. The first subsidiary, digitoday.fi, was established in Finland. In 2001, Telenor purchased the company and cancelled the internationalisation effort. The subsidiary in Finland was sold to its employees, and digitoday.no got back its old name digi.no.
