= Edward Norman Baker =

British colonial officer

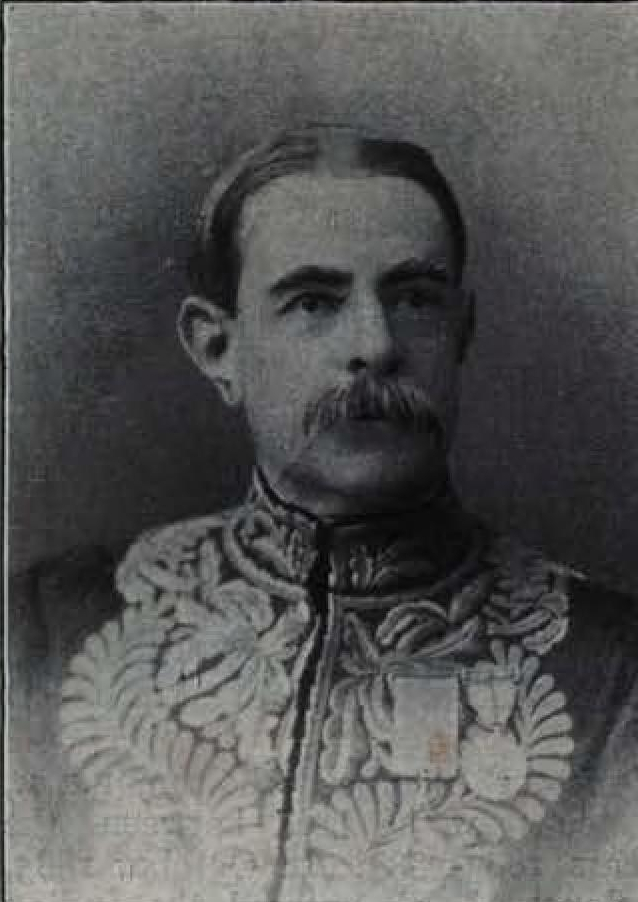
c. 1907

Sir Edward Norman Baker, KCSI (23 March 1857 – 28 March 1913) was a British colonial administrator who served as Lieutenant-Governor of Bengal.

The son of Arthur Baker, he was educated at Christ's College, Finchley, and joined the Indian Civil Service, going to Bengal in 1878. He served on the Bengal Legislative Council from 1898 to 1902. From 1908 to 1911 he was Lieutenant-Governor of Bengal. In retirement he was an ordinary member of the Council of India.
