= Lal Dighi, Kolkata =

Artificial reservoir in Kolkata, India

Lal Dighi
- Tank Square or Dalhousie Square
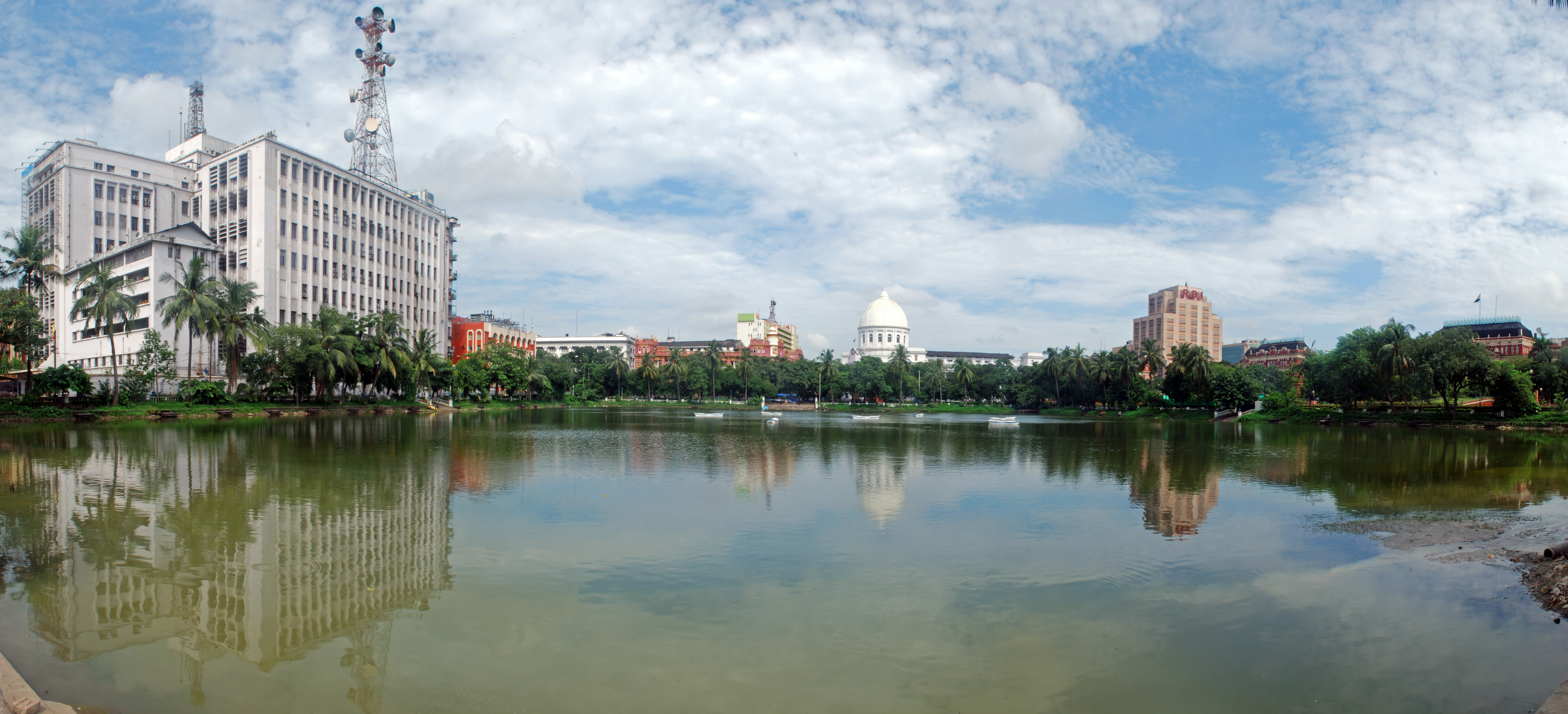
- Interactive map of Lal Dighi
- Location: Kolkata
- Coordinates: 22°34′18.5″N 88°20′57.4″E
- Etymology: Resemblance of a red pond during Holi
- Surface area: 25 acres (10 ha)
- Average depth: 6 metres (20 ft)

Lal Dighi, also called the Tank Square or Dalhousie Square (Bengali pronunciation: [lal diɡʱi]) is a man-made water tank in Kolkata, India.

== Etymology ==
The park was referred to as Lal Bagh or Lall Bagh, due to the name of the surrounding neighbourhood, when it was first established in the area. An anecdote can be found interlinked in the name of this thing. Because of the celebration of Holi, which resulted in the pond turning a red or crimson colour, the park became known as Lal Dighi. This name comes from the colour of the pond after the festival. Another theory says that the pool appeared red due to the reflection of the red coloured old fort.

== Structure and function ==
Lal Dighi acts as a reservoir to supply water in the BBD Bagh complex.

Lal Dighi is a 25 acres (10 ha) wide body of water in the area of BBD Bagh. Some of the heritage buildings including Andrew's Church, Writers' Building, High Court, General Post Office are situated nearby to the tank.

== History ==
Lal Dighi was also known as Tank Square or Dalhousie Square earlier. It was built before the British era.

== See also ==
- Tala tank
