= History of Kolkata =

History of Kolkata, India

Kolkata, or Calcutta, was a colonial city. The British East India Company developed Calcutta as a village by establishing an artificial riverine port in the 18th century CE. Kolkata was the capital of the British India until 1911, when the capital was relocated to Delhi. Kolkata grew rapidly in the 19th century to become the second most important city of the British Empire after London and was declared the financial (commercial) capital of the British India. This was accompanied by the fall of a culture that fused Indian philosophies with European tradition.

Kolkata is also noted for its revolutionary history, ranging from the Indian to the leftist Naxalite and trade-union movements. Labelled the "Cultural Capital of India", "The City of Britain", "The City of Revolutionaries", and the "City of Joy", Kolkata has also been home to prominent statesmen, scientists, philosophers, and literary personalities. Problems related to rapid urbanization started to plague Kolkata from the 1930s, and the city remains an example of the urbanization challenges of developing nations.

== Before the British ==
From the 14th to 16th centuries, Kolkata was under the rule of the Bengal Sultanate. It was conquered by the Mughal Empire and incorporated into the Bengal Subah in 1576 following the Mughal invasion of Bengal.

== Establishment of English trade in Bengal (1610–1900) ==
There is a long chain of events behind the arrival of the East India Company in Bengal, specifically Job Charnock in Sutanuti in 1690. These incidents are documented in numerous records of the East India Company and by several authors [Bruce 1810 (Vol I and II), Marshman Vol I, Unknown 1829; see references below]. These documents tell the story of how the English were severely beaten and wiped out from Bengal several times by the forces of the Mughal Emperor, and how each time they came back to Bengal to continue their trade.

The agents of the East India Company first visited the provinces of Bengal and Bihar for trade during the period of Ibrahim Khan (ca 1617–1624), the Subahdar (Governor) of Bengal at the time of Mughal Emperor Jahangir. The first factory was established in Surat in 1620 and later in Agra, and agents were further sent from these places to the eastern provinces to examine the possibility of opening factories there. However, the transportation costs and logistics were unfavorable, and the plan was abandoned. In December 1644, the daughter of the Emperor was severely burnt and a doctor named Gabriel Boughton, formerly the surgeon of the East Indiaman Hopewell, was sent from Surat for her treatment.

He was able to treat her burns successfully. In reward, the Emperor allowed the company to establish a factory at Pipili, Odisha, and for the first time, English ships arrived at an eastern port. During 1638, Raja Iqbal Jahan appointed his son Shah Shuja as the Subahdar of Bengal and Boughton visited the capital at Rajmahal where his services were again used to treat one of the ladies in the palace, and in return, the company was allowed to establish factories in Balasore, Odisha and Hooghly, Bengal in addition to Pipili, Odisha.

Shaista Khan was appointed as the governor of Bengal in around 1664 by Mughal Emperor Aurangzeb and was relieved upon his request in around 1682. While he was returning to Delhi, Englishmen sent with him a request to the Emperor to obtain a special firman to do business forever in Bengal; the Emperor was pleased to provide them the Firman, and the occasion was celebrated with a 300-gun salute at Hooghly. The investment in Bengal soared, the Bengal residency was separated from Madras, and Mr. Hedges was appointed as the chief officer to oversee trade in Bengal. His residence in Hooghly was secured with soldiers obtained from Madras. This is the first time English soldiers set foot on the soil of Bengal. However, the Firman was vague in many aspects, and soon disputes started to grow between the English and the governor.

During this time, a local disturbance occurred when the zamindar in Bihar attacked the governor of Bihar. Mr. Charnock, the chief of the factory in Patna, was imprisoned by the governor on the assumption that he was involved in the dispute. At the same time, their saltpetre trade was disrupted by another rival English company. To protect their trade in Bengal, the original East India Company requested to build a fort in the mouth of the Hooghly or on its banks. This request was immediately turned down by Shaista Khan, and a 3.5% tax was imposed in addition to the already existing tax of 3,000 rupees, notwithstanding the Firman obtained earlier. Another incident involving the Faujdar of Cossimbazar led to altercations between the Governor of Bengal and the company, causing their ships to depart Bengal without securing cargo.

Enraged with this situation and determined to establish their authority, the company requested King James II in 1685 to permit the use of force against the Emperor's army to settle the matter. Admiral Nicholson was sent with ships to attack the port at Chittagong, fortify it, make an alliance with the King of Arakan who was against the Mughals, establish a mint and collect revenue, thus making Chittagong a fort city for the Company in the eastern part. Then he was ordered to proceed to Dhaka. It was assumed that the governor would abandon the city, and then a peace treaty would be offered, which would guarantee free trade and other economic benefits for the company. He would cede the territories of Dhaka and Chittagong. Job Charnock was then at Madras and was directed to join the expedition with 400 soldiers from the Madras division.

Unfortunately, the plan went awry; some of the ships, due to the change in current and wind, arrived at Hooghly instead of Chittagong and anchored off the factory in Hooghly after being joined by their Madras troops. The presence of a large number of warships alarmed Shaista Khan, and he immediately offered a truce. However, the peace was broken again when some Company troops misbehaved with Shaista Khan's troops in Hooghly on 28 October 1686, for which the latter severely beat the former. At the same time, the admiral opened fire and burnt down 500 houses; property losses were about thirty lacs of rupees. However, a truce was again obtained between Mr. Charnock and the local Foujidar, and the English were allowed to put saltpetre on board their ships. However, Shaista Khan, upon hearing this, ordered the closing and confiscation of all their factories and properties in Bengal and sent a large force to drive out the English from Hooghly.

Upon hearing the news of Shaista Khan's plan, Mr. Charnock determined that it was no longer safe to remain in Hooghly and decided to move downstream to Sutanuti, a small hamlet on the banks of the river Hooghly on 20 December 1686. At this time, their ships in Bengal required extensive repairs, and the remainder of their fleet was considered in danger. In this situation, they considered themselves extremely fortunate if they could hold their current position instead of pursuing their desires in Chittagong. For this reason, they decided to ask forgiveness from the Emperor and requested reinstatement of the previously obtained Firman.

A peace treaty was again offered by the governor at the end of December 1686, but it was mainly to buy out time for an attack, and by February 1687, a large troop of Shaista Khan's army arrived at Hooghly to drive the Company out of Bengal. Charnock decided it was not safe to remain in Sutanuti and moved to the island village at Hijli. There he remained with his soldiers in an utterly inhospitable place full of mosquitoes, snakes, and tigers. The Governor's troops did not bother them there since they knew the company would not be able to survive long there. In fact, within three months, about half of Charnock's soldiers died, and the remaining half were ready to be hospitalized.

With his back to the wall, Charnock was desperately willing to negotiate with Shaista Khan to get out of this mess. Luck favored him because of an unexpected event. At the time when Nicholson was ordered to proceed to Chittagong, Sir John Child was ordered to withdraw the company's establishment from Bombay, commence hostilities on the western coast, blockade Mughal harbors, and attack their ships anywhere to be found. Emperor Aurangzeb wanted to reconcile with the company to ensure the uninterrupted voyage of pilgrims to Mecca and asked his governors to make terms with them.

As a result, a peace treaty was signed between Shaista Khan and Charnock on 16 August 1687. Shaista Khan allowed them to remain in Bengal; however, they were limited only to Uluberia, a small town on the bank of the river Hooghly south of Sutanuti, where they were allowed to make a port and do business from there. Still, their warships were strictly forbidden from entering the Hooghly. Charnock arrived at Uluberia, started making a dock there, however soon began to dislike the place and wanted to return to Sutanuti. At this time, the governor asked them to return and settle at Hooghly, ordered them not to build any structure at Sutanuti, and asked Charnock to pay a large sum of money for compensation. While not in a position to fight against the Governor's troops, two Company agents were sent to Dhaka to plead to the governor to allow them to return to Sutanuti and build a fort there.

At the same time, when the news of the failure of Nicholson reached England, it was decided that until a fort was built on the bank of the river, the English would never be able to do business with ease and would always be at the mercy of the forces of the governor. For this, Captain Heath was sent to Bengal with 160 soldiers either to fight and win against the forces of the governor or to bring back all the properties of the company to Madras and abandon the trade in Bengal. Captain Heath arrived in October 1688 in Bengal, took all of the company's personnel on board, and set sail to Balasore on 8 November 1688. He reached Balasore on 29 November, pounded and destroyed the town, including their own factory, and released some English prisoners from the Governor's prison.

They left Balasore on 13 December for Chittagong, reached there on 17 December, found the Governor's fortification too strong to destroy, and decided to wait until the governor answered his demands. However, instead of waiting for the Governor's answer, Captain Heath set sail to Arakan, arrived there on 31 January 1689, and offered a treaty to the king that the English would fight against the Mughals at Dhaka and the king would provide them with settlements in his dominion. When a fortnight passed without any answer from the king, Captain Heath, frustrated and dejected, returned to Madras on 4 March 1689. This was a total failure of English objectives in Bengal during the early period of 1689, which caused them to abandon Bengal as their trading location in the eastern region.

Emperor Aurangzeb, enraged with the situation that the Company fortified Madras, occupied territory around it, captured Mughal ships, went into alliance with his enemy Sambhaji, ordered his commanders everywhere in India to exterminate the company from the country, and seize their properties wherever they were found. Warehouses in Visakhapatnam were destroyed, and many Englishmen were captured and put to death. Shaista Khan pursued them in Dhaka, captured them, and imprisoned them.

Shaista Khan retired from his duty as governor in ca 1689, and Ibrahim Khan was appointed as the new governor of Bengal by Emperor Aurangzeb. By this time, Aurangzeb was camping at Visapur and was much aware of the fact that he was losing revenues from the Company trade, and the Company ships could cause him much trouble by stopping the pilgrimage to Mecca since they controlled the sea-route. At the same time, the company was desperate to open negotiations with the Emperor after they left Bengal and Mr. Child was sent to him. He decided to accept the offer and ordered the Governor of Bengal to allow the company to return there.

As a result, Ibrahim Khan invited Mr. Charnock back to Bengal. Still, Mr. Charnock refused to return until a specific Firman with clearly specified terms and conditions was issued by the Emperor, so that they would not be subjected to further humiliations. Ibrahim Khan again sent a letter to Mr. Charnock explaining that he had requested the special Firman from the Emperor. It would take a few months before it arrived, and in the meantime, Mr. Charnock was welcome to settle in Bengal, and the governor would pay him 80,000 rupees for the goods that Shaista Khan's regime had destroyed.

With this friendly invitation, Mr. Job Charnock, with 30 soldiers, returned to Sutanuti on 24 August 1690 and hoisted the Company standard on the banks of the river Hooghly, thus beginning a new era of Company involvement in Bengal. In the next year, Ibrahim Khan sent the order from the Emperor to Mr. Charnock, which allowed unrestricted trade without paying any other taxes except the usual 3,000 rupees.

Mr. Charnock died in January 1692. While the English were always looking for fortification of their factories in Bengal, Ibrahim Khan never allowed them to do so. In 1695, the town of Hooghly was seized by Sobha Singh along with an unknown Afghan Rahim Khan, and the English at Sutanuti requested from the governor to use their own armed protection for their factories when the enemy surrounded their factories.

Ibrahim Khan allowed them to protect their own factories, but did not explicitly permit any fortification. However, in the absence of specific orders, the permission to defend their property was taken as a permit to build a fortress, and construction began immediately, overnight, with all available manpower. The fort was built on the bank of the river Hooghly at Sutanuti with mortar brought from Madras, completed in ca 1701, and was called Fort William after King William III of England. This was the old Fort William, and construction for a new one (the present one) started after Siraj Ud-Daulah attacked Fort William in 1756.

In 1690, Job Charnock, an agent of the East India Company, selected this location for a British trading settlement. The site was chosen carefully, protected by the Hooghly River to the west, a creek to the north, and by salt lakes approximately two and a half miles to the east. There were three large villages along the east bank of the river Ganges, named Sutanuti, Gobindapur, and Kalikata. The British bought these three villages from the local landlords. The Mughal emperor granted the East India Company freedom of trade in exchange for an annual payment of 3,000 rupees.

== Origins ==
=== Name ===
The rent-roll of Akbar, the 16th century Mughal emperor, and the work of a Bengali poet, Bipradas Pipilai, of the late 15th century, both make mention of the area's early name's being Kolikata, from which Kolkata/Calcutta derive.

There is much discussion about the origin of the city's name. The most accepted view is that it comes from the Hindu goddess Kali and the original name was KaliKshetra, "the place of Kali.

Other theories include:

- The name comes from the location of the original settlement beside a khal ("canal" in Bengali)
- The place was known for its manufacture of shell-lime, the name deriving from kali ("lime") and kata ("burnt shell")
- The name is derived from the Bengali kilkila ("flat area"), which is mentioned in the old literature.
- The name came into being when Job Charnock asked a farmer the name of the area around the Hooghly River. The farmer misunderstood due to language problems and thought that he was referring to when he harvested his paddy. He proudly replied " 'Kal Kaata' hoe chhilo'" meaning "I cut it yesterday." Job Charnock thought that the name of the place was Calcutta.

The area where the city is now located was originally inhabited by the people of three villages: Kalikata, Sutanuti, and Gobindapur. However, the boundaries of the three villages gradually became less distinct, and before the battle of Plassey, the city could be divided into four different sub-areas: European Kolkata (Dihi Kolkata); a residential village with some sacred spots (Gobindapur); a traditional Indian market (Bazar Kalikata or Burrabazar); and a riverine mart concentrating on cloth trade (Sutanati). After the battle of Plassey in 1757, the Company started rebuilding the city.

The Calcutta High Court ruled in 2003 that Job Charnock, the Englishman generally believed to be the founder of the Calcutta, is not the founder of the city and that hence Kolkata has no birthday. According to the Court, the city has its genesis in the Maurya and Gupta period and it was an established trading post long before the Slave Dynasty of the Delhi Sultanate, the Mughals, the Portuguese, the French or the East India Company established a modern township there.

The East India Company chose the place for a trade settlement. In 1690, the Company bought three villages (Sutanuti, Kalikata, and Gobindapur) from a local landlord family of Sabarna Roy Choudhury. The next year, the company began developing the city as a Presidency City. In 1727, on the order of King George I, a civil court was set up in the city. The Calcutta Municipal Corporation (now renamed Kolkata Municipal Corporation) was formed, and the town had its first mayor.

=== Journey from British rule to independence ===
The three villages (Sutanuti, Gobindapur & Kalikata), particularly in Kalikata, where Calcutta is located, came into the possession of the British East India Company in 1690 and some scholars like to date its beginnings as a major city from the construction of Fort William by the British in 1698, though this is debated (see the court ruling in "Name and origins" above). From 1772 to 1911, Calcutta was the capital of British India. From 1912 to India's Independence in 1947, it was the capital of all of Bengal. After Independence, Calcutta remained the capital of the Indian state of West Bengal.

=== The fall of Calcutta to Siraj ud-Daula ===
When the Seven Years' War broke out, owing to their constant rivalry with the French, and the fall of Madras to the forces of Dupleix, early in 1756 the British authorities in Calcutta began repairs to the fortifications of old Fort William, which were extremely decayed. This irritated the new Nawab of Bengal, Siraj Ud Daulah, who viewed it as a threat to his sovereignty. Enraged still further when the British granted asylum to one Krishnaballav, who had embezzled money from the dewani of Dhaka, Siraj ud-Daula first attacked and captured Cossimbazar (taking as hostage William Watts and Begum Johnson), and then Calcutta, which fell after a short siege on 20 June 1756, during which the governor and many other officials escaped down the Hooghly River, leaving the remainder of the garrison and the Eurasian population of Calcutta to their fate.

This is now known as the Siege of Calcutta. It is said that 123 Britons later died in the Black Hole of Calcutta after his victory, but recent evidence calls into question the numbers involved, and suggests that the Nawab himself was probably unaware of what transpired. He renamed Calcutta Alinagar after the previous Nawab, and his maternal grandfather, Alivardi Khan. Having installed Manikchand as the ruler of Alinagar, Siraj returned to Murshidabad. Soon (on 2 January 1757) Watson and Robert Clive retook Calcutta with a force of company sepoys and the assistance of the Royal Navy. Hearing the news, Siraj ud-Daula moved to attack Calcutta, but fearing an attack from Ahmad Shah Abdali, after a few days of war, he signed the Treaty of Alinagar with the East India Company, permitting them to build the fort.

Although Siraj ud-Daula conceded temporary defeat in the Pact of Alinagar, he once again began scheming with the French against the British. Meanwhile, the Third Carnatic War was starting in the south. Also at this time, nobles such as Jagat Seth, Mir Jafar, Rai Durlav, Omichand, and Rajballav were plotting against Siraj ud-Daula (a principal reason being the Nawab's arrogance, well attested to in contemporary sources) and they invited Clive to take part in their plans.

Clive seized on this plan to get rid of two enemies at once. Citing non-existent reasons, he attacked Murshidabad, having previously reached an agreement with Mir Jafar to install him on the musnud of Bengal. On the fateful day of 23 June 1757, 23 miles away from Murshidabad in the mango groves of Palashi, the armies met at the Battle of Plassey. The British army consisted of 800 European soldiers and 2,200 Indian soldiers, while the Nawab's army was made up of 18,000 cavalry and 50,000 infantry. At the start of this seemingly impossible battle, generals Rai Durlav and Iar Latif held their armies together, but in an act of treachery, Mir Jafar led his troops away from the battlefield, and the remaining military led by Mirmadan and Mohanlal was defeated.

Siraj ud-Daula escaped but was later caught and killed by Miran, the son of Mir Jafar. Mir Jafar was made the new Nawab, and the British had effectively seized control of Bengal. In 1765, after defeating the next Nawab, Mir Qasim, the Nawab of Oudh and the Mughal Emperor at the Battle of Buxar, there was no one to stand in the way of the British and their dominance in North India. Thus, British imperialism in India began with the conquest of Bengal, a pivotal event in which the great city of Calcutta played a significant role.

Calcutta also had an indirect but important influence on the battles of the Carnatic Wars. When Madras fell to Dupleix, the British were still able to direct the war from another of their strongholds, Calcutta. They also used the wealth of Bengal to defeat the French. As Dr. R. C. Majumdar stated in An Advanced History of India, "The Battle of Plassey may be truly said to have decided the fate of the French in India."

== British India ==
=== Ecological change ===
The city's colonial coat of arms of Kolkata issued in December 1896.

In pre-colonial Bengal, the mobile wetland terrain of the delta supported livelihoods that adapted to seasonal shifts between land and water. The colonial period introduced legal and administrative frameworks that redefined this fluid environment as a fixed geography, converting wetlands into static urban property. In Calcutta, this process of “land-making” transformed a base of “liquid land” into the solid ground of the colonial Presidency town. Traces of this watery past remain visible only in moments of disruption, such as land subsidence in central Kolkata. The history of Calcutta's development reflects a broader pattern in which colonial urbanisation imposed stability and rigidity on an environment once characterised by movement, permeability, and constant change. Birds like the greater adjutant stork, locally known as the hargila (“bone swallower”), were once a common sight in Calcutta, serving as a natural scavenger along the city's riverbanks. These large birds consumed human remains, animal carcasses, and refuse, preventing the spread of disease and deterring jackals from disturbing bodies. In the late 18th century, it was not unusual to see a stork perched on and feeding from a floating corpse in the river.

The greater adjutant also preyed on snakes, helping reduce fatalities from snakebites, which were a leading cause of death at the time. This, in turn, improved river water quality, as corpses of snakebite victims were traditionally set adrift. The bird's ecological role earned it official recognition from the colonial administration, which named it “greater adjutant” after a senior British military rank. In 1896, the Calcutta municipal coat of arms was designed to feature two storks facing each other, each holding a snake in its beak, with a royal crown placed between them. The bird largely disappeared due to increasing urbanisation.

=== Churches ===
St. John's Church, originally a cathedral, was among the first public buildings erected by the East India Company after Kolkata became the effective capital of Company rule in India. It is located at the North-Western corner of Raj Bhavan, and served as the Anglican Cathedral of Calcutta till 1847, when the see was transferred to St. Paul's Cathedral. Construction of the building, modelled on St Martin-in-the-Fields of London, started in 1784, with Rs 30,000 raised through a public lottery, and was completed in 1787. It is the third oldest church in the city, next to the Armenian and the Old Mission Church.

=== 18th century scandals ===
One of the most notorious incidents of the latter part of the century was the trial and execution of Nanda Kumar, who had been the governor of Hugging in 1756. In 1764, he had been appointed collector of Burdwan in place of Warren Hastings, which resulted in a long-standing enmity between the two men. In 1775, when Hastings was Governor-General, Nanda Kumar brought accusations of corruption against him, accusing him of accepting bribes and other abuses of power. These were taken up with enthusiasm by Hastings' rivals on the Governor General's Council, led by Philip Francis. Whilst this matter was still awaiting investigation, Nanda Kumar was indicted for forgery of a deed, condemned, and executed. There was a strong suspicion that the charges had been invented by Hastings and that he had put pressure on the judges to pass a sentence of death. At the time, it was far from clear whether English law applied in Calcutta, and it was extremely rare for the death penalty to be applied for forgery, even in England. Furthermore, Nanda Kumar was a Brahman, and his hanging caused widespread dismay and outrage in Calcutta.

Warren Hastings and Sir Elijah Impey, the Chief Justice, were both impeached, and were accused by Edmund Burke and afterwards by Thomas Babington Macaulay of committing a judicial murder. Five years after this incident, in 1780, relations between Warren Hastings and Philip Francis deteriorated to such an extent that the two fought a duel in the grounds of Belvedere (now the National Library) on the road to the suburb of Alipore. Francis was severely wounded, but Hastings escaped unscathed.

=== Opium trade ===
After the territorial conquest of Bengal in 1757, the British East India Company pursued a monopoly on the production and export of opium from India. The company bought opium from local traders and later directly from farmers, and sold it at auction in Calcutta. From there, much of it was smuggled to Canton in China by foreign traders, eventually leading to the First Opium War (1839–1842).

== Social and intellectual life in the 18th century ==
In 1772, Calcutta became the capital of British India, a decision made by Governor General Warren Hastings. On 29 January 1780, Hickey's Bengal Gazette or the Calcutta General Advertiser became the first newspaper to be printed in India, and is an invaluable chronicle of the social life of Anglo-Indian society in Calcutta. Contemporary memoirs such as those of William Hickey record the consumption of enormous meals, washed down by copious quantities of claret, port, madeira, and other wines, followed by the smoking of Hookahs. After the death of his English wife Charlotte (who is buried in Park Street Cemetery), Hickey married a Bengali girl called Jemdanee, who died in childbirth in 1796, prompting him to write in his journal that "Thus did I lose as gentle and affectionately attached a girl as ever man was blessed with".

Such unions between Europeans, English, French, and Portuguese, and local women, both Hindu and Muslim, were common throughout the 18th century in Calcutta, and are the origin of the city's substantial Anglo-Indian (or Eurasian) community today; by the early 19th century, however, increasing racial intolerance made marriages of this kind much rarer.

Calcutta's intellectual life received a significant boost in 1784 with the establishment of the Asiatic Society of Bengal by Sir William Jones, with the encouragement of Warren Hastings, himself a notable Oriental scholar. Jones worked closely with the pandits of the Kalighat Temple, together with the local ulema, in translating and producing new editions of rare and forgotten texts. His study of Sanskrit with Pandit Ramlochan at Nadiya led him to posit the existence of the Indo-European family of languages. Many distinguished scholars, English and Bengali, such as Henry Thomas Colebrooke, James Prinsep, and Pandit Radhakanta Sarman would grace the society's meetings and publications over the following century, vastly enriching knowledge of India's culture and past.

Calcutta saw the establishment of several different Western-style higher education institutions this period, including Sanskrit College (1824), Calcutta Medical College (1835), University of Calcutta (1857), Surendranath College (1885) and the Indian Association for the Cultivation of Science (1887), India's first research institute.

=== The Baboo/Babu culture and the Bengal renaissance ===
In the time of British India, Calcutta was "the second city of the British Empire" (after London) and was aptly renamed "City of Palaces" and the Great Eastern Hotel was regarded as the "Jewel of the East". Calcutta at that time was famous for its "Baboo culture", a mixture of English liberalism, European fin de siècle decadence, Mughal conservatism, and indigenous revivalism, inculcating aspects of socio-moral and political change. This culture was fostered in its wake by the Zamindari system, the Dāyabhāga system, the Hindu joint family system, the Mitākṣarā system, the Muslim Zenana system, the Protestant spirit of free capitalist enterprise, the Mughal-inspired feudal system, and the Nautch. This also fostered the Bengal Renaissance, an awakening of modern liberal thinking in 19th century Bengal, and which gradually percolated to the rest of India.

=== Growth ===
Nautical flag of Kolkata recorded in 1862 by Vlaggen van alle Natien. Pavillons de toutes les nations (Flags of all nations).

In 1750, Calcutta had a population of 120,000. The centre of company control over the whole of Bengal from 1757, Calcutta underwent rapid industrial growth from the 1850s, especially in the textile sector, despite the poverty of the surrounding region. Trade with other nations also grew. For example, the first U.S. merchant ship arrived in Kolkata in 1787. In fact, the U.S. Consulate in Calcutta is the U.S. Department of State's second-oldest consulate, dating back to November 19, 1792.

Despite being almost destroyed by a cyclone, in which 60,000 died, on 5 October 1864, Calcutta grew, mostly in an unplanned way, in the next 150 years from 117,000 to 1,098,000 inhabitants (including suburbs), and now has a metropolitan population of approximately 14.6 million.

== Contribution to the independence movement of India ==
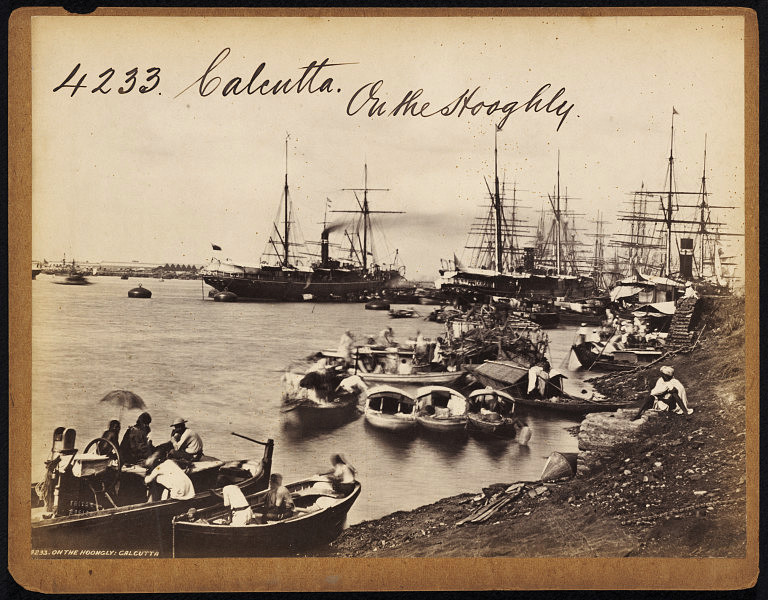
Hooghly River, Calcutta by Francis Frith (taken between 1850 and 1875)

Historically, Calcutta was the center of activity in the early stages of the national independence movement. Exactly a hundred years after the fall of Bengal in the Battle of Plassey, Calcutta saw the beginning of what is often called the First Independence Movement of India. It is also just as usual, not referred to as a War of Independence, and as one historian put it, "The so-called First National War of Independence was neither First, nor National, nor a War of Independence". In the suburbs of Calcutta, at the Barrackpore military barracks, sepoy Mangal Pandey sparked off a huge revolt that shook the foundations of the British Empire. This movement is sometimes also called the Indian Mutiny, although recent evidence suggests that "The Revolt of 1857" is a better and less controversial choice.

In 1883, Surendranath Banerjee organised a national conference – the first of its kind in 19th-century India. This conference heralded the birth of The Indian National Congress. The first native president of the Indian National Congress was Sir Womesh Chunder Bonnerjee and he was also the first Congress president to advocate self-rule by Indians, Sir Surendra Nath Banerjea (referred to by the British as "Surrender Not") were early eminent Calcuttans, who provoked and influenced nationalist thinking in the late 19th and early 20th centuries.

Other societies based on nationalist or religious principles were established, such as the Hindu Mela. Revolutionary organisations like the Jugantar and the Anushilan Samiti were formed to use force against the British rulers. Among early nationalist leaders, the most prominent were Sri Aurobindo, Indira Devi Chaudhurani, and Bipin Chandra Pal. The early nationalists were inspired by Swami Vivekananda, the foremost disciple of the Hindu mystic Sri Ramakrishna, and helped by Sister Nivedita, disciple of the former. The rousing cry that awakened India's soul was penned by Bankim Chandra Chattopadhyay. Now the national song of the nation, it is an ode to the land of Bharat (India) as the Divine Mother, "Vande Mataram".

The Elgin Road residence of Subhas Chandra Bose in Calcutta was the place from where he escaped the British to reach Germany during the Second World War. He was the co-founder of the Indian National Army and the head of state of the Arzi Hukumate Azad Hind, formed to counter and combat the British Raj in India. Renamed Netaji by poet laureate Rabindranath Tagore, he is regarded by many as perhaps the most prominent and influential freedom fighter in Indian history and is venerated in many Bengali households even today.

Muslims were also involved in the nationalist movement, most notably Fazl Huq, who from Calcutta in the 1930s attempted to organise a non-communal peasant party to agitate against the British and the wealthy Indian landowning class. The fact that many of the Hindus in this latter group were linked to the local Congress organisation and dominated the mainstream nationalist movement in Bengal from Calcutta led to attempts to thwart Huq's activities and fed into the tragic decline in communal relations that savaged Calcutta in 1946 and 1947.

== After independence ==
Gradual expansion of Kolkata Municipal Corporation

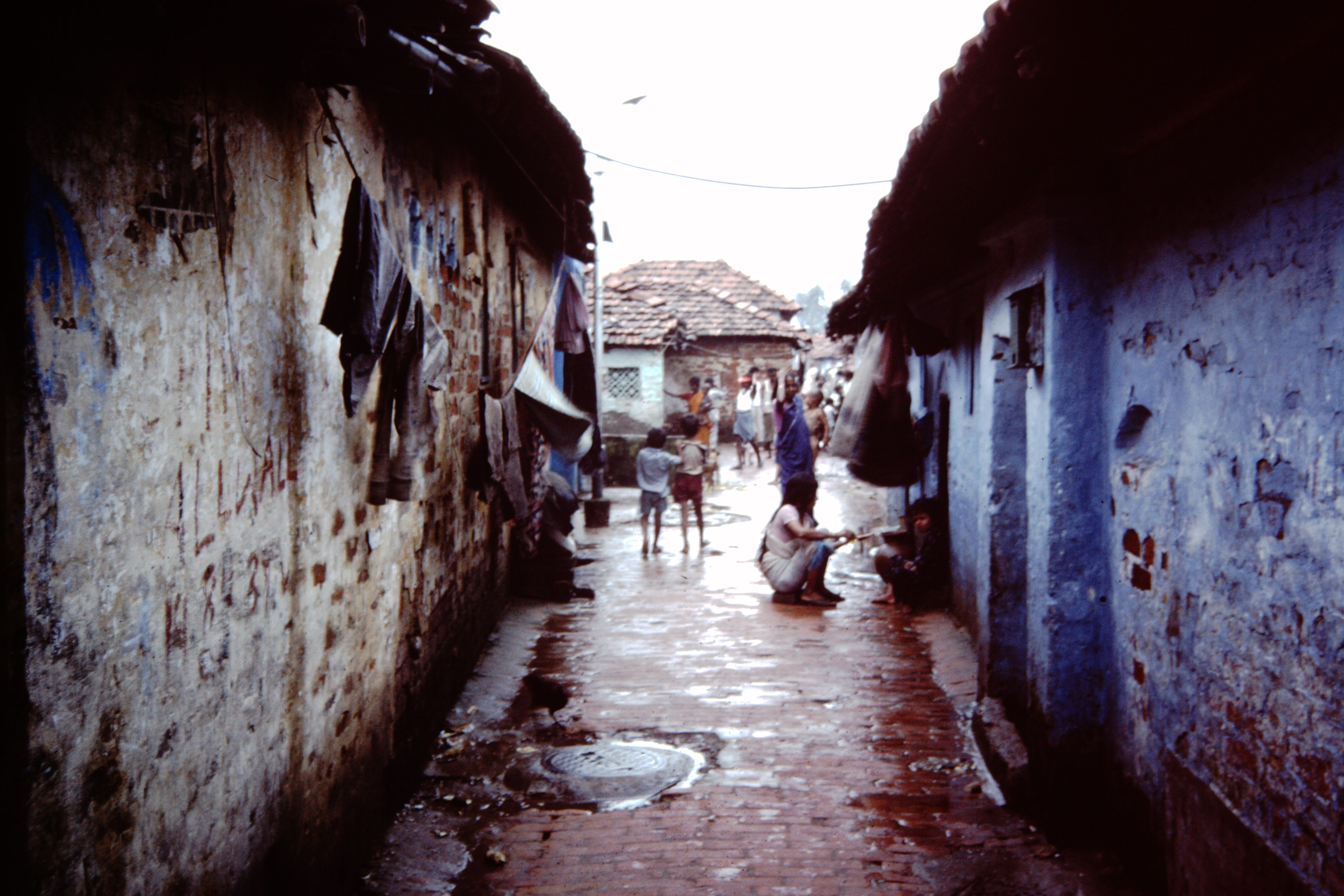
Slum in Calcutta, 1986

The intense violence caused during the partition of India led to a shift in demographics in Bengal, and especially Kolkata; large numbers of Muslims left for East Pakistan, while hundreds of thousands of Hindus arrived to take their place. Kolkata received millions of refugees from what became East Pakistan without receiving substantial assistance from the central government.

Over the 1960s and 1970s, severe power shortages, strife in labour relations (including strikes by workers and lockouts by employers), and a militant Marxist-Maoist movement that sometimes used violence and property destruction as tactics of protest – the Naxalites – damaged some of the industrial infrastructure, leading to some economic stagnation. The city has historically been a strong base of Indian communism: West Bengal was ruled by the Communist Party of India (Marxist) (CPI(M)) dominated Left Front for nearly three decades – the world's longest-running democratically elected communist government.) In 1971, the war between India and Pakistan led to another massive influx of refugees from the former East Pakistan (now Bangladesh), and their settling in Calcutta massively strained its already damaged infrastructure.

In the mid-1980s, Bombay overtook Calcutta as India's most populous city. In 1985, Rajiv Gandhi referred to Calcutta as a "dying city" because of the political decline of his party.

The city's economic recovery gathered momentum after economic reforms in India were introduced by the central government in the mid-1990s. Since 2000, information technology (IT) services revitalized the city's stagnant economy. The city has also experienced a growth in the manufacturing sector. Following similar moves elsewhere in the country, the state government changed the city's official name from "Calcutta" to "Kolkata" in 2001.

== See also ==
- 2007 Kolkata riots
- British India
- French India
