= Etymology of Kolkata =

Origin of the place-name Kolkata

There are several theories about the origin of Kolkata, erstwhile Calcutta in English, the name of the capital of the eastern Indian state of West Bengal.

Ain-i- Akbari, the rent-roll of Akbar, the sixteenth-century Mughal emperor, and Manasa-mangal, the work of a Bengali poet, Bipradas Pipilai, of the late fifteenth century, both make mention of the city's early name's being Kolikata, from which Kolkata/Calcutta have been derived

There is lot of discussion on how the city got its name. There are different views on the issue. The most popular and likely one is that the city got its name from its connection to the Hindu goddess Adyashakti paramba Kali with the original name's being either Kalikshetra (in Sanskrit), meaning the place of Adyashakti Kāli, or Kalikkhetrô (the Bengali pronunciation of Kalikshetra), meaning "area of Goddess Kali", with Kolikata being thought to be a variation of Kalikkhetrô. This theory is the most possible one as in the rural Bengali pronunciation the 'kh' consonant is replaced by 'k' and the 'tro' joined consonant is replaced by 'to', resulting in Kalikhetrô being Kaliketô which is very close to Kolikata. Other more or less plausible theories abound, like:

- The name derived from the location of the original settlement beside a khal (which means canal in English)
- According to a folk etymology, Britishers, when they visited the city, saw the goddess with a skull garland. This reminded them of the place Golgotha, which later became Kolkotha.
- According to another theory, the place was known for the manufacture of shell-lime. And the name derived from lime (kali) and burnt shell (kata).
- An interesting, but very possibly casually fabricated, anecdote exists on the nomenclature of Kolkata. According to it, a British merchant was travelling through the village, when he came upon a peasant stacking hay into the barn. Not knowing where he was, the merchant asked the peasant about that place. The peasant, unfortunately, did not understand English, and he guessed that the sahib must be inquiring about the date the crop was harvested. In his own language, he replied "kāl kāʈa hoyechilo" which in Bengali language means "harvested yesterday" (kal – yesterday, kāʈa – cut, harvested, 𝘩𝘰𝘺𝘦𝘤𝘩𝘪𝘭𝘰 – it's). The merchant was happy in the knowledge that he had learned about the name of the place, and left the place. Following English transcription, "Kāl Kāʈa" became "Calcutta".
- The name may have its origin in the words khal meaning "canal", followed by kaṭa, which may mean "dug".
- The name may have been derived from the Bengali term kilkila ("flat area").
- Another theory is that the name derives from Kalighat.
- According to another theory, the area specialised in the production of quicklime or koli chun and coir or kata; hence, it was called Kolikata.

The area where the city is now located was originally inhabited by the people of three villages— Kalikata, Sutanuti and Gobindapur. However, the boundaries of the three villages gradually became less distinct, and before the battle of Plassey, the city could be divided into four different sub-areas – European Kolkata (Dihi Kolkata), a residential village with some sacred spots (Gobindapur), a traditional Indian market (Bazar Kalikata or Burrabazar) and a riverine mart concentrating on cloth trade (Sutanati). After the battle of Plassey in 1757, the British started rebuilding the city with the notions of making it the capital for their Empire.

The Calcutta High Court ruled in 2003 that Job Charnock, the Englishman generally believed to be the founder of the Kolkata, is not the founder of the city and that hence Kolkata has no birthday. According to the court, the city owes its genesis in the Maurya and Gupta period and it was an established trading post long before the slave dynasty of the Delhi Sultanate, the Mughals, the Portuguese, the French or the British established a modern township there. References to the existence of an ancient riverine port (named Kalikata) exist in the travel journals of Chinese scholars and Persian merchants dating from centuries BCE. The Hindu epic Mahabharata, lists the King of "Vanga" (meaning Bengal), as having fought alongside the Kauravas in the great war.

In spite of the high court ruling, the growth of the present city can be dated from 1690, when Job Charnock, an agent of the English East India Company chose the place for a trade settlement. In 1698, the East India Company bought three villages (Sutanuti, Kalikata and Gobindapur) from a local landlord family of Sabarna Roy Choudhury. The next year, the company began developing the city as a Presidency City. In 1727, as per the order of King George I, a civil court was set up in the city. The Calcutta Municipal corporation (recently renamed as Kolkata Municipal Corporation) was formed and the city had its first mayor.

Although the city's name has always been pronounced Kolkata or Kôlikata in Bengali, the anglicised form Calcutta was the official name until 2001, when it was changed to Kolkata in order to match Bengali pronunciation.

== Nicknames of Kolkata and their etymology ==
• Kolkata is considered to be the science capital of India. Because Kolkata is home of some of the India's leading scientific and technological research centres, Therefore, the scientific research output and research quality of Kolkata is very high. Kolkata has become India's top city in science and research according to the prestigious Nature Index 2024. Among the top 200 science cities worldwide, it ranks 84th.

• Kolkata is often referred to as the Gateway of Southeast Asia.
