= Dihi Panchannagram =

Group of villages purchased by East India Company

Dihi Panchannagram was a group of 55 villages which the East India Company purchased in 1758 from Mir Jafar, after the fall of Siraj-ud-daulah, the last independent Nawab of Bengal, in what is now the city of Kolkata, earlier known as Calcutta, in Kolkata district, in the Indian state of West Bengal. These villages initially developed as suburbs of Kolkata, but now forms part of the city proper within the limits of the Kolkata Municipal Corporation.

== Background ==
In the early years of the 18th century, Calcutta was a small settlement spread across a narrow stretch on the east bank of the Hooghly. Most of the English residences were to be found around what was then the fort in Kalikata. To its north was Sutanuti hat (cotton and yarn market), and still north lay the native area of Sutanuti. To the south, Gobindapur was a forested area. Beyond the English settlement lay Chitpur, Bhowanipur and Kalighat, and across the river lay Betor and Salkia. In 1742, the Marathas burst into Bengal, and Nawab Alivardy Khan required all his energy and skills to keep them at bay. They laid waste the countryside. There was a feeling of insecurity in the English settlement and they procured the permission of the Nawab to build a protective ditch around the settlement. When a part of the Maratha Ditch was ready, the realisation dawned that the Marathas were not going to attack Calcutta. The project was abandoned but the ditch remained a sort of a boundary for the English settlement.

== Dihis and mouzas ==
The 55 villages were known en-bloc as Dihi Panchannagram and their details are as follows (old archaic spellings for the places retained):
Dihi Sinthee (1. Sinthee 2. Cossipur 3. Paikpara).
Dihi Chitpore (4. Chitpore 5. Tallah 6. Beerpara 7. Kalidaha).
Dihi Bagzollah (8. Dakhindarie 9. Kankooria 10. Noabad).
Dihi Dakhin Paikparah (11. Belgachya).
Dihi Ooltadangah (12. Ooltadangah 13. Bagmari 14. Gouriberh).
Dihi Similiah (15. Bahir Similiah 16. Narikeldanga).
Dihi Soorah (17. Soorah 18. Kankoorgatchi 19. Koochnan 20. Duttabad).
Dihi Cooliah (21. Mullickabad 22. Cooleah).
Dihi Sealdah (23. Sealdah 24. Baliaghata).
Dihi Entally (25. Entally 26. Pagladanga 27. Neemuckpota 28. Gobrah 29. Tangrah).
Dihi Topsiah (30. Topsea 31. Tiljulla 32. Baniapooker 33. Kareya).
Dihi Serampur (34. Chowbagah 35. Dhullunda 36. Sanpgatchee 37. Auntobad 38. Nonadanga 39. Bondel–Ooloberia 40. Beddeadanga 41. Koostea 42. Purannuggur 43. Ghoogoodanga 44. Serampur).
Dihi Chukerberh (45. Ballygunj 46. Gudshaha 47. Chuckerberh).
Dihi Bhowanipur (48. Bhowanipur 49. Neejgram).
Dihi Monoharpur (50. Beltola 51. Kalighat 52. Monoharpur 53. Moodeali 54. Shahnagar 55. Koykalee).

P. Thankappan Nair says that the English obtained from the Mughal emperor Farrukhsiyar, in 1717, the right to rent from 38 villages surrounding their settlement. Of these 5 lay across the Hooghly in what is now Howrah district. These were – Salkia, Haora, Kusundia, Ramkrishnapur and Betor. The remaining 33 villages on the Calcutta side were (spellings have been modernised): Dakshin Paikpara, Belgachia, Dakshin Dari, Bahir Dakshin Dari, Chitprur, Hoglakundi (or Hoglakuria), Ultadanga, Shimulia (or Shimla), Macond, Kamarpara, Kankurgachi, Bagmari, Shura, Bahir Shura, Dolland, Shrirampur, Chaubaga, Tapsia, Shiltala, Sangassey, Gobra, Kulia, Tangra, Hintalee (or Entali), Colimba, Jal Colimba, Shealdah, Mirzapur, Arcooley, Birjee, Chourangi, Shehparra and Garedalparra. These villages gradually reconstituted themselves as 55 mouzas and hance the name "Panchannagram". These were grouped under 15 dihis.

H.E.A. Cotton says that in addition to the comparatively small British settlement, which was defined in a proclamation dated 10 September 1794, primarily as the area within the Maratha Ditch, the 55 villages of Panchannagram formed the suburbs beyond the ditch. They were spread over an area of 23 square miles and even in the early 20th century were under the magisterial and revenue jurisdiction of 24 Parganas.

== Thanas ==
Along with the dihis and mouzas, noted above, another administrative division for the development of an integrated colonial settlement was the thana or police station. In the earlier days, the police stations also looked after the civic needs of the people. The earliest list of thanas was prepared in 1785 (names modernised): Armenian Church, Old Fort, Chandpal Ghat, ‘South of the Great Tank’ (Lal Dighi or B.B.D. Bagh tank), Dharmatala, Old Court House, Domtala, Amragali and Panchanantala, China Bazar, Chandni Chowk, ‘Trul Bazar’, Jhamapukur, Charakdanga, Simla Bazar, ‘Lallunch’ (Raja Ramlochan’s) Bazar, Malancha and Pataldanga, Kabardanga, Baitakkhana, Shyampukur, Shyambazar, Padmapukur, Kumartuli, Jorasanko, Mechhuabazar, Jan Bazar, Dingabhanga, Sutanuti Hatkhola, Daychata, Hanspukur, Colimba and Jorabagan.

In 1888, these thanas were regrouped under 25 Police Section Houses. The 25 wards created under the Calcutta Municipal Act of 1889, precisely matched these divisions. The final picture of old Calcutta had emerged. We present here a brief of the 25 Police Section Houses:
1. Shyampukur, the citadel of Bengali aristocracy. It was long overtaken by the adjacent settlements of Shyambazar and Baghbazar.
2. Kumartuli, still retains its fame for clay images.
3. Bartala, the area where the Rajas of Shobhabazar, the most orthodox Hindus of Calcutta, lived.
4. Sukeas (corrupted to Sukea) Street, named after Armenian Merchant, Peter Sukeas.
5. Jorabagan or Jora Bari Bag.
6. Jorasanko, the seat of the Tagore family.
7. Barabazar, the market has been traced back to 1738, as the old Sutanati hat, but the present-day wholesale market was a creation of the Marwaris, who achieved phenomenal success in the second half of the 19th century.
8. Kalutola, the home of the oil pressers, harks back to the beginning of the 18th century.
9. Muchipara, the home of the cobblers, was not there in 1785 and so must have come up subsequently.
10. Boubazar, bahu or bride’s market, can be traced back to 1739.
11. Padmapukur, adjacent to Boubazar, is difficult to locate. The Byaparitola tank in Dingabhanga became Wellington Square (now Subodh Mallick Square).
12. Waterloo Street Police Section was split among three sections in 1785: Old Fort, ‘South of the Great Tank’ and Old Court House.
13. Fenwick’s Bazar, named after Edward Fenwick, stood east of the present New Market.
14. Taltala is a Muslim dominated area.
15. Kalinga, takes its name from colimba or musk melon.
16. Park Street, earlier known as Badamtala, then as Burial Ground Road, and finally Park Street in 1840s, because of Sir Elijah Impey’s deer park.
17. Bamun Bustee, a slum area occupied by the servants of the Park Street sahibs, later converted to a European neighbourhood.
18. Hastings, initially a Muslim burial ground, then ‘Coolie Bazar’ for workmen who built Fort William, and then a township for Ordnance and Commissariat department people.
19. Entali, once part of salt lakes beyond the Maratha Ditch, later a marshy area for economically distressed sections of society.
20. Beniapukur, the home of the merchants, is mentioned from the mid-eighteenth century, but the thana dates from early 19th century.
21. Baliganj and Tollyganj formed a combined thana. Baliganj grew up around a market for sand and had garden-houses of 18th century Europeans. Baliganj emerged as a citadel of the educated Bengali middle class after the suburban railway opened up the area. Tollyganj was earlier called Rasa Pagla, and in the 18th century, it had European garden-houses in a predominantly jungle area. Tipu Sultan’s sons settled down in the area after the Vellore Mutiny in 1806.
22. Bhabanipur existed as a dihi in 1765 and also absorbed a part of Dihi Chakraberia. It is said the original shrine of Kali, stood here on the bank of the Adi Ganga, a ‘small brook’ and was shifted to the present site at Kalighat, about a mile away, in 1809. The construction of Harish Mukherjee Road and Lansdowne Road (now Sarat Bose Road) and extension of Hazra Road to Kalighat, opened up the area at the beginning of the 20th century.
23. Alipur, initially a Muslim locality, was taken over by the British elite, late in the 18th century. Alipur became the headquarters of 24 Parganas district and acquired military installations. It has a meteorological observatory. The Belvedere Estate, once the Lieutenant Governor’s palace, now houses the National Library of India. Around it are Hastings House, the Zoological Garden and the gardens of the Agri-Horticultural Society.
24. Ekbalpore developed as a Muslim neighbourhood with the settlement of those displaced for the construction of the zoo at Zirat in Alipur police station, and King George’s Docks (now Netaji Subhas Docks) at Garden Reach, as well as migration of Momins or weavers from Bihar and UP.
25. Watganj is named after Colonel Henry Watson, who set the first dockyards in Bengal.

Outside the area of the 25 Police Section Houses, mention may be made of Garden Reach, which became a Muslim area when Nawab Wajid Ali Shah, with a large entourage settled in Metiabruz.

== Conclusion ==
P. Thankappan Nair writes:

The six square miles within the Maratha Ditch thus came to have the world’s highest density of population in that age. It was a heterogeneous population, sinking differences of caste, creed and colour under the sheer compulsion to interact and survive together. The compulsion has grown stronger ever since, as has the spirit it fostered. Hence Calcutta did not disintegrate when the capital was shifted to New Delhi in 1912. It has kept growing and living by the ever-renewed confidence and vitality of its inherent human forces."
