= Betor =

Village in West Bengal, India

Betore (Bengali: বেতড়) was a major trading centre, the location being around present Shibpur in Howrah district in the Indian state of West Bengal.

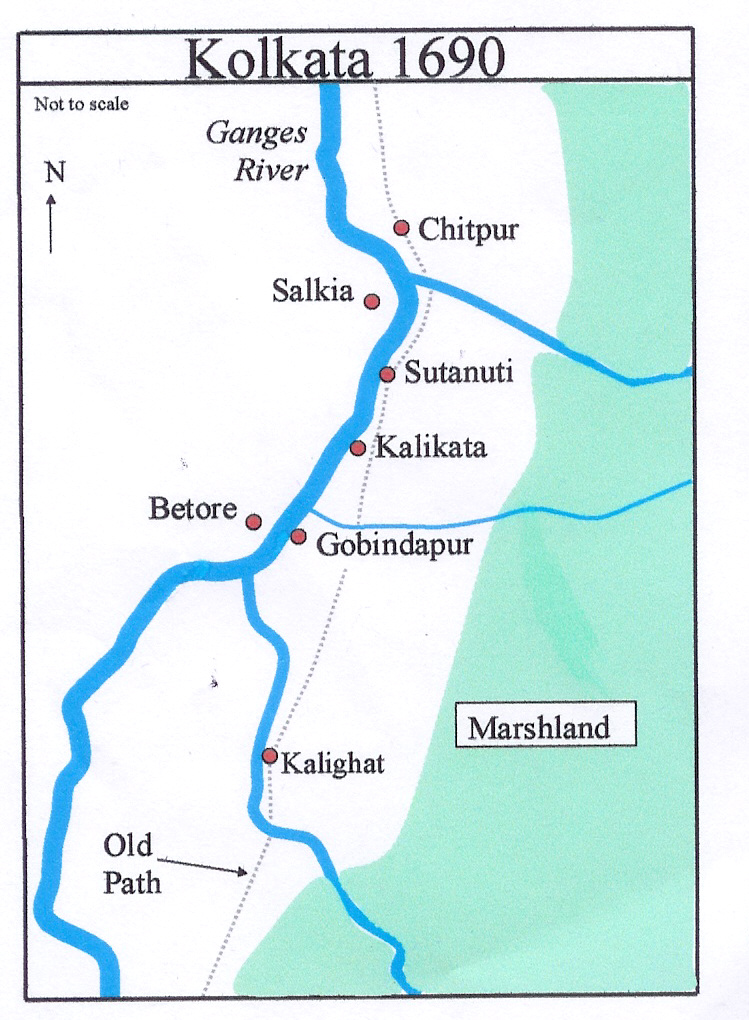
Betor in the Map of Calcutta (1690)

In addition to the three recognised hamlets, Sutanuti, Gobindapur and Kalikata around which the city of Kolkata has grown up, must be added at least four others as the elementary constituents of the city (including Howrah on the opposite bank). These are Chitpur, Salkia, Kalighat and Betore. Out of these four Betore, which was the focus of trade once upon a time, vanished in the seventeenth century.

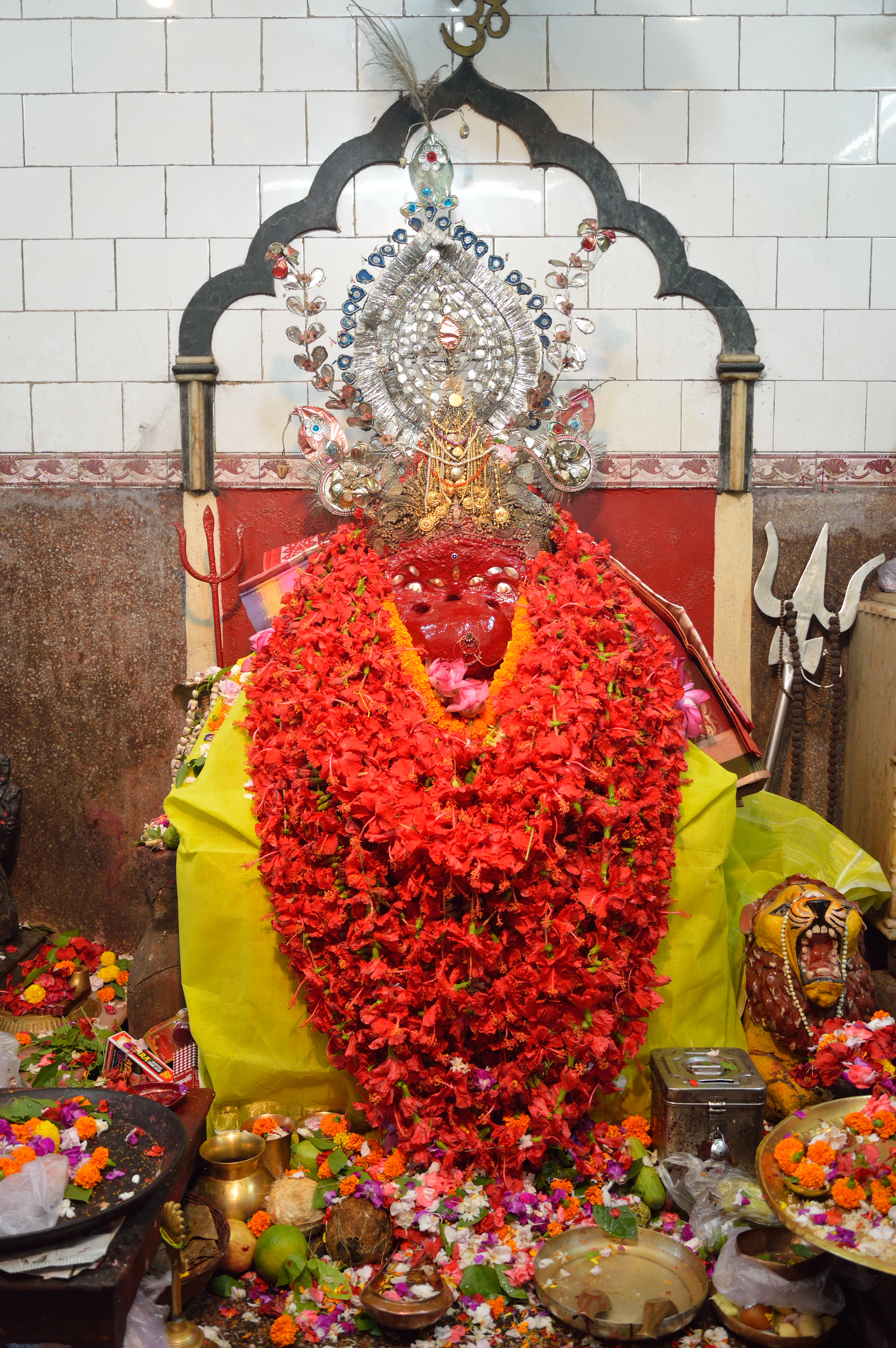
The Batai Chandi Idol of Batai Chandi Temple

At the end of the fifteenth century, a poem in praise of the serpent-goddess written by Bipradas Pipilai gives us the first authentic glimpse of the area. Satgaon or Saptagram on the west bank of the Hooghly river, between Bandel and Tribeni was a great port. Lower down the river, on the same bank, Betore was a large market town, where travellers paused to buy provisions and worship the goddess Chandi. Chitpur and Kalikata were neighbouring villages passed just before reaching Betore. Gobindapur and Sutanuti did not exist. Kalighat was a small sanctuary claiming just a bare mention.

Caesar Frederick, a Venetian who had travelled in the East from 1563 to 1581 and has left behind an account about some important cities, ports and business centres of India and of Bengal, mentions, “A good tides rowing before you come to Satgan, you shall have a place which is called Buttor, and from thence upwards the river is very shallow, and little water.”

At present only a simple temple of Betaichandi still exists beside the G.T. Road in Shibpur, Howrah.
