= Elite Cinema Hall, Calcutta =

Elite
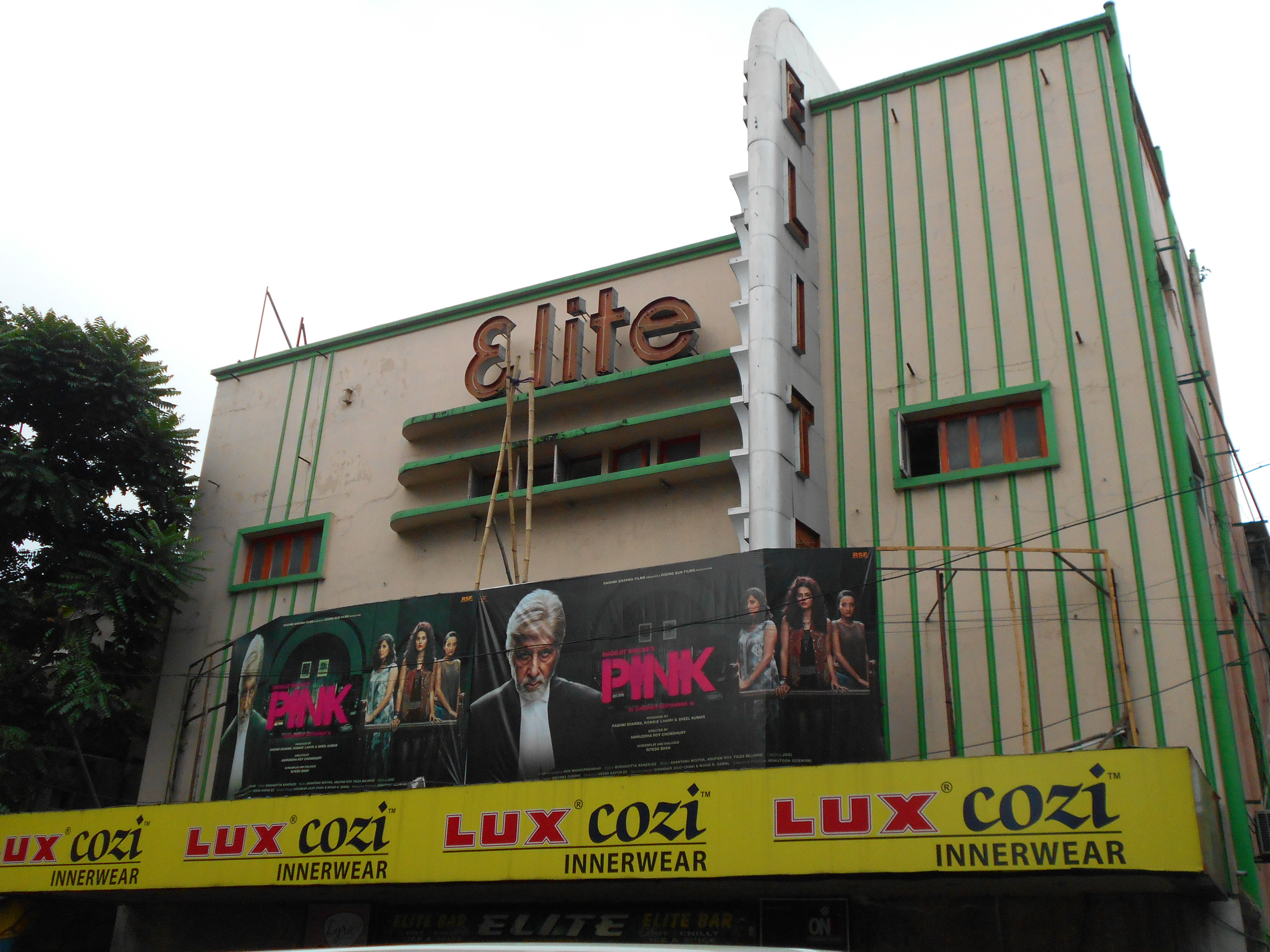
- Elite Cinema Kolkata

- Location within Kolkata

General information
- Status: Closed
- Type: Cinema hall
- Location: in Dharmatala, Esplanade, Central Kolkata, 136, SN Banerjee Road, Esplanade, Dharmatala, Kolkata, West Bengal 700013, Kolkata, India
- Coordinates: 22.5629291°N 88.3538589°E
- Inaugurated: 1940

The Elite was a single-screen theater, situated in S.N. Banerjee Road, Kolkata. It had started operation on August 2, 1940. It was once owned by 20th Century Fox and photographic studio Bourne & Shepherd and had its share of silver screen legends like Raj Kapoor, Amitabh Bachchan and Shah Rukh Khan to name a few. The 78-year old auditorium in central Kolkata ended its journey on 1 June, 2018.

The building was finally demolished on the 12th. of February 2024.
