= Dharmatala =

- Neighborhood of Kolkata
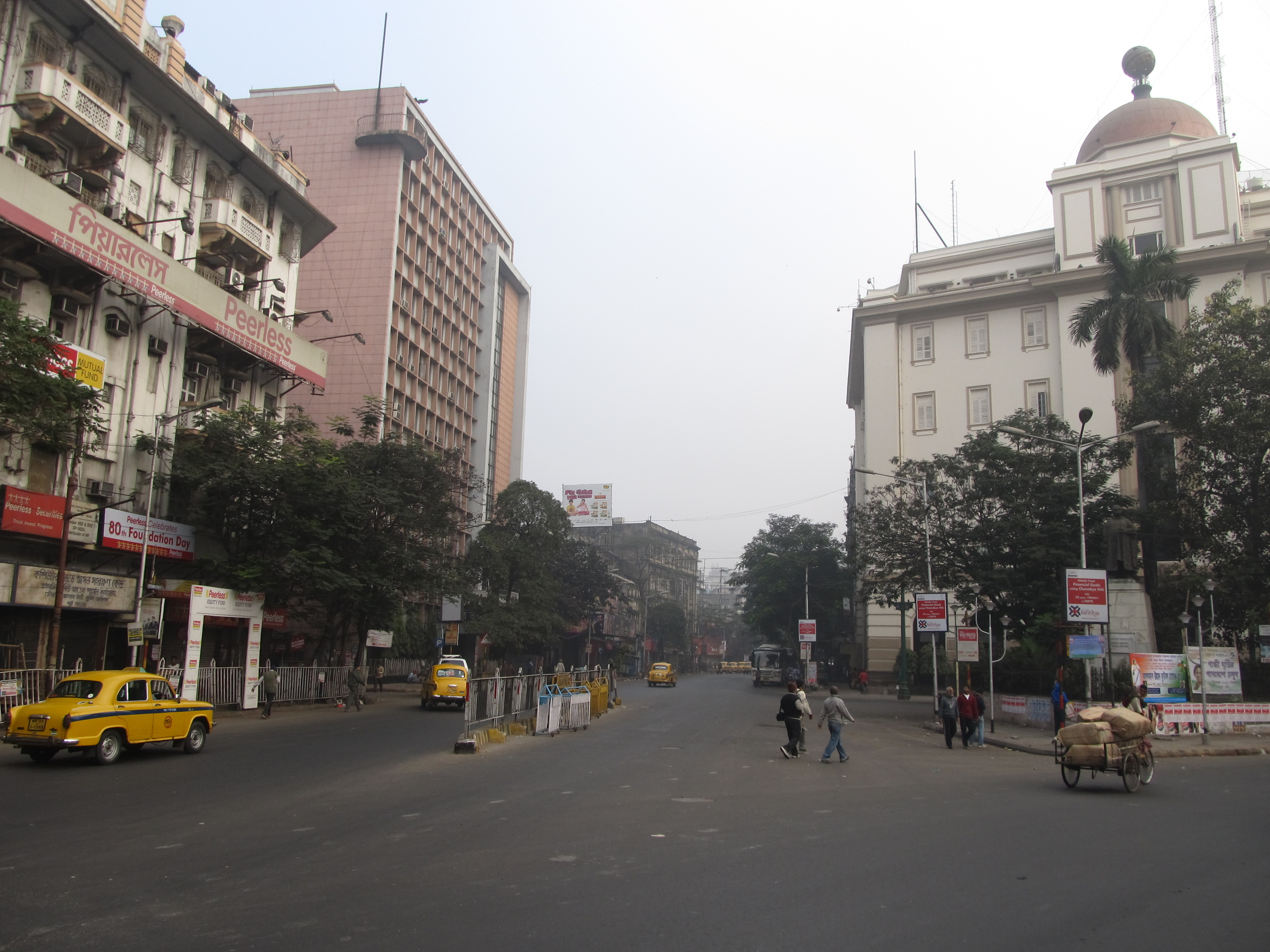
- Bentinck Street in Dharmatala

- Location of Dharmatala in Kolkata
- Coordinates: 22.560055°N 88.352540°E
- Country: India
- State: West Bengal
- District: Kolkata
- City: Kolkata
- Municipal Corporation: Kolkata Municipal Corporation
- KMC wards: 46, 47
- Elevation: 36 ft (11 m)

Population
  - Total: For population see linked KMC ward pages
- Time zone: UTC+5:30 (IST)
- PIN: 700013, 700069
- Area code: +91 33
- Lok Sabha constituency: Kolkata Uttar
- Vidhan Sabha constituency: Chowranghee
- Kolkata Metro station: Chandni Chowk, Esplanade
- Tram stop: Dharmatala, Esplanade
- Bus stop: Dharmatala

Dharmatala (archaic spelling Dharmotola) is a neighbourhood of Central Kolkata, in Kolkata district in the Indian state of West Bengal. Dharmatala Street has been renamed after Lenin as Lenin Sarani but the neighbourhood up to Wellington Square continues to be referred as Dharmatala. It is a busy commercial area that had come up with the growth of Calcutta during the British Raj and is thus one of the repositories of history in the city.

== Etymology ==
Dharmatala means Holy Street. It is commonly held to derive its name from a large mosque which stood at the site of Cook and Company's livery stables. Some discern the name as a reference to dharma, one of the units of the Buddhist Trinity. There was a Buddhist temple at Janbazar, nearby. Tipu Sultan Mosque at the corner of Chowringhee Road and Dharmatala, was built in 1842, by Prince Gholam Mohammad, son of Tipu Sultan. Binoy Ghosh feels that the name Dharmatala is because of the preeminence of Dharmathakur in olden days. Haris and Doms, who are worshippers of Dharmathakur, predominated the area even in the memorable past.

== Geography ==
Dharmatala extends from Chowringhee Road (renamed Jawaharlal Nehru Road) to Nirmal Chandra Street. It is bounded to the north by Bowbazar, the south by Janbazar, the east by Taltala and the west by Maidan.

The neighbourhood is spread over 2 wards: 46 and 47 of Kolkata Municipal Corporation.

== History ==
In the 18th century, Dharmatala is described as ‘a well raised causeway, raised by deepening the ditch on both sides’. It was shaded with trees on both sides.

Just north of Dharmatala a creek formerly ran from Chandpal Ghat to Beliaghata (or Baliaghata, as it was then known). The creek passed through what was later Wellington Square (renamed Subodh Chandra Mallick Square) and Creek Row. The earlier name of Creek Row was Dhinga Bhanga, as a ship broke there during the cyclone of 1737. The creek was navigable for large boats. Wellington Square was a tank made on the bed of this creek. Both Wellington Square and Creek Row were developed by the Lottery Committee. Calcutta Gazette of 9 August 1821 refers to Wellington Square as ‘the new square in Dharmotola.’

While the English quarter was then restricted to around the old fort (present B.B.D. Bagh), the area south of Dharmatala was a jungle. The native quarters to the north consisted of a number of straggling villages.

After their victory in the Battle of Plassey, the English decided to build new Fort William, in 1758. For this purpose, the native population shifted from Gobindapur mostly to Sutanuti. The European inhabitants of Kalikata gradually forsook the narrow limits of the old palisades and moved to around the Maidan. Civilians were not allowed to live within the new fort. Gradually the areas to the south of the Great Tank and to the east along Chowringhee Road were emerging as preferred haunts for the Englishmen. While Sutanuti developed as the Black Town, the Esplanade and Chowringhee emerged as the White Town. However, the areas around Writers' building, Baitakkhana (Bowbazar), Dharmatala and Janbazar went down in estimation and were gradually taken over by ‘the rest’, which included half-castes, Portuguese, Armenians and so on, 'to become grey areas between Black and White Towns of old Calcutta'.

The district lying between Dharmatala and Bowbazar, bounded on the west by Bentinck Street, has historically been inhabited by a diverse group of people, including those of Portuguese and other European descent as well as Indians. The area was described as full of ‘tortuous and narrow lanes, badly drained and reeking with foul odours, thickly populated and miserably housed.’ The northern end of this district is home to a bazaar called Chandney Chowk, which has been described as such: ‘It is a labyrinth of ill-kept passages, lined with shops, in which may be found a wonderful collection of sundries, from a door nail to a silk dress.’

Dharmatala Bazar was established in 1794 at the corner of Dharmatala and Chowringhee. Rudyard Kipling in the last chapter of his Kolkata sketches published under the title of The City of Dreadful Nights, has given a lively description of the market and its frequenters. It was formerly called Shakespeare's Bazar.

In the earliest list of police stations in Kolkata made in 1785, both Dharmatala and Dingabhanga were included. However, when the police stations were reorganised in 1888–89, the number of police stations were reduced and no mention is there of either.

== Transport ==
A three-horse omnibus plied briefly between Dharmatala and Barrackpore in November 1830 but the truly successful horse-drawn public transport was the tramcar. These were introduced in Dharmatala in March 1882. In 1899, the Calcutta Tramways Company started electrifying the entire system.

Dharmatala has always been a major traffic hub. Today, Dharmatala is the busiest bus terminus of West Bengal. Kolkata trams route no. 5, 25 and 36 also start their journey from Dharmatala.

During rush hours some 200,000 to 300,000 vehicles pass through Dharmatala. Experts say 50–60 percent of air pollution in Kolkata is due to vehicle emission. Increase in number of vehicles may have added to the problem. In the Dharmatala area, the noise levels are 75–84 dB.

According to transport department officials, over 2,000 long-distance buses operate from the city. Most of the state and private buses originate from here.

Eden Gardens railway station on Kolkata Circular Railway line is the nearest railway station. Sealdah Station, one of the five major railway-terminals of Kolkata Metropolitan Area, is also nearby.

The Esplanade metro station of Kolkata Metro opened on October 24, 1984, with the opening of the Esplanade–Bhawanipur section of Blue Line. Ten years later, the line was extended northward to Chandni Chowk. Both these stations in the Dharmatala area are among the busiest in the network. It serves as an interchange station since the opening of Kolkata Metro Green Line 2 between Esplanade and Howrah Maidan. Purple Line of Kolkata Metro is also planned to terminate at Esplanade running from Joka.

== Gallery ==
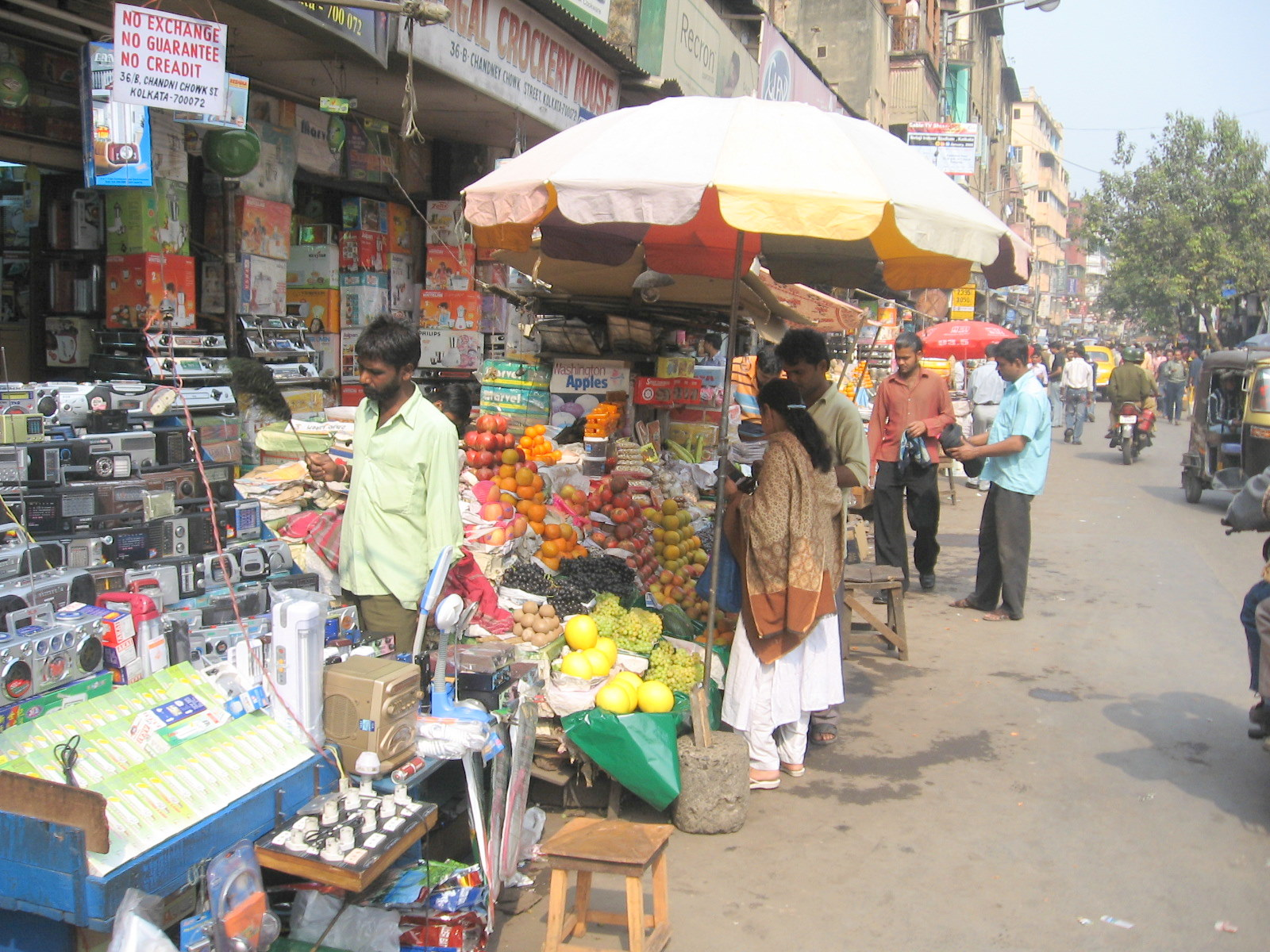
A part of Chandni Chowk Street

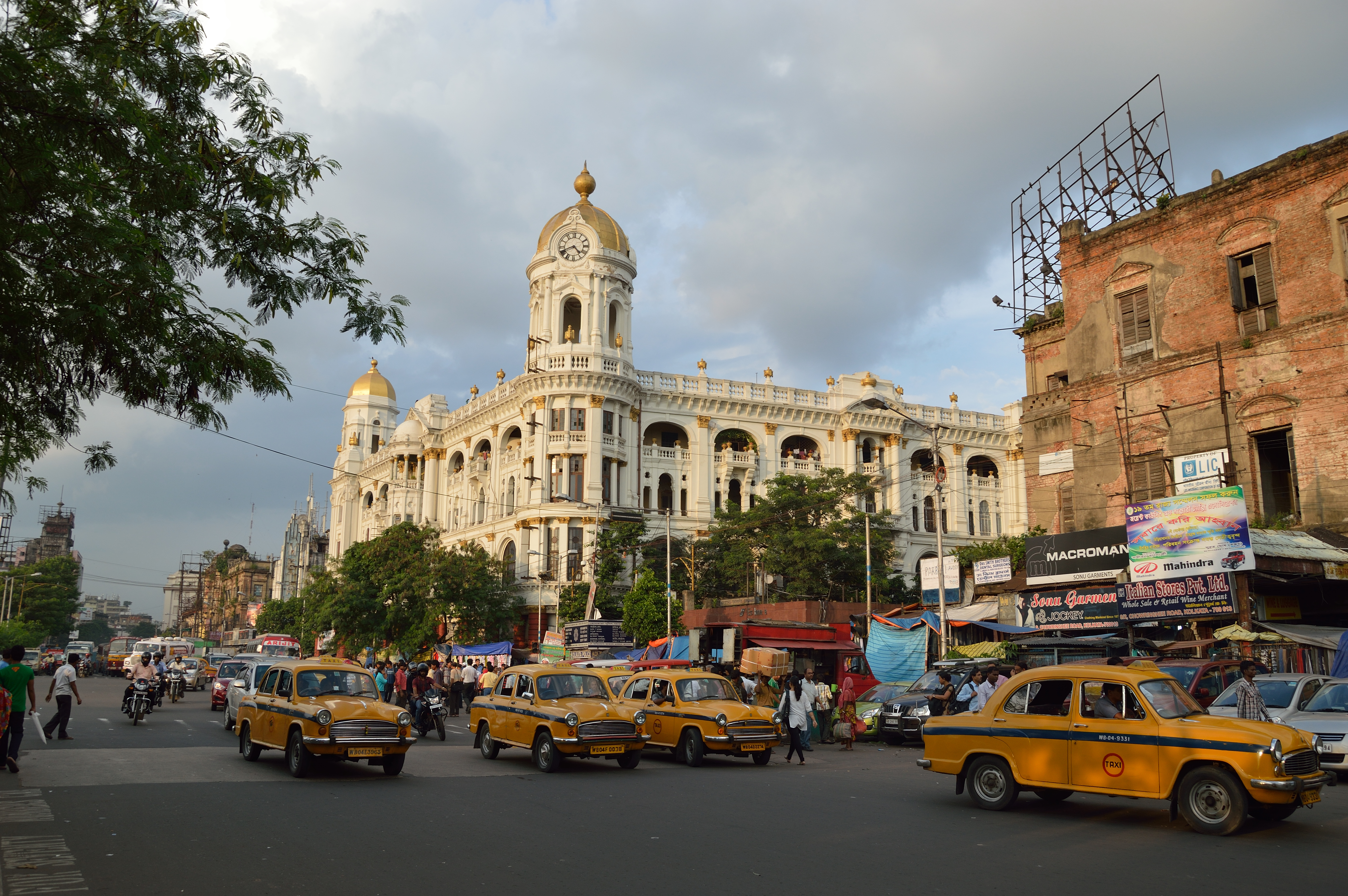
Metropolitan Building

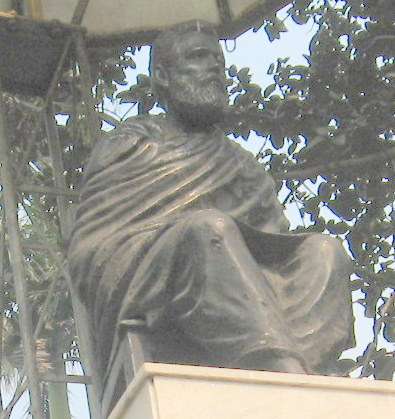
Statue of Utkalmani Pandit Gopabandhu Das

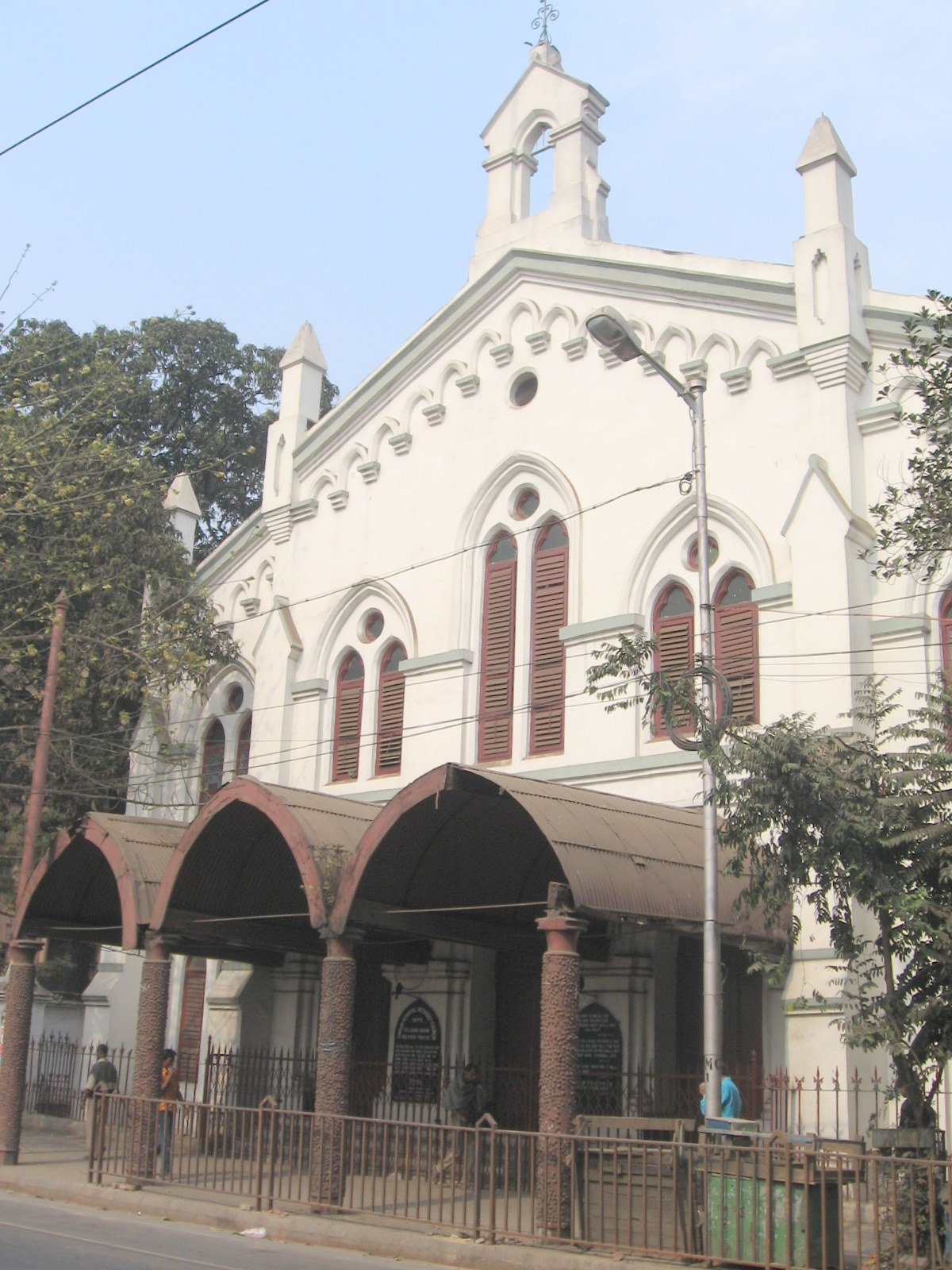
Thoburn Memorial Methodist Church, established in 1873

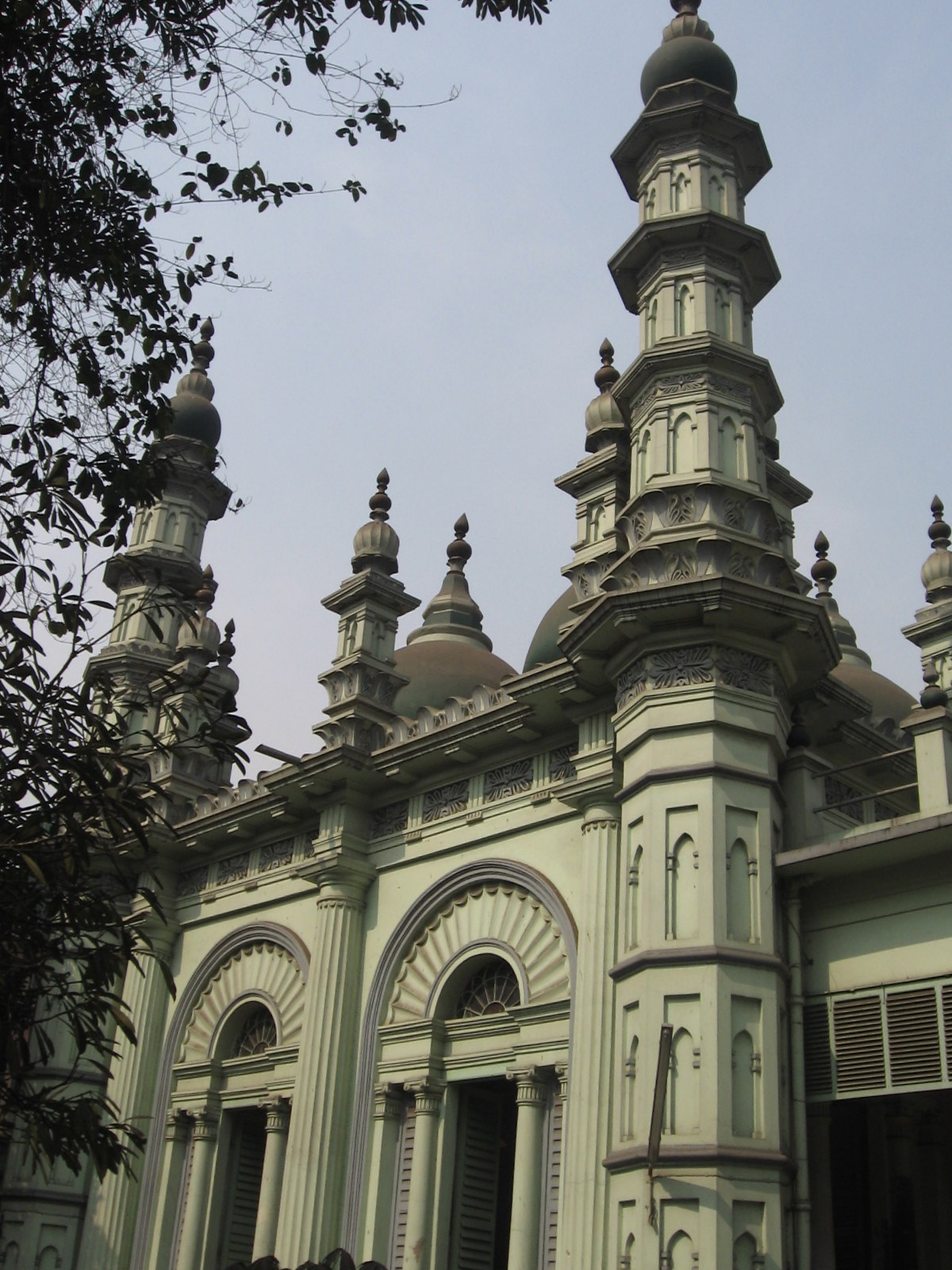
A closer view of Tipu Sultan Mosque
