= Michael Ochei =

Nigerian footballer

Personal information
- Full name: Michael Emeka Ochei
- Place of birth: Nigeria
- Date of death: 17 September 2014
- Place of death: Ballygunge, India
- Position: Striker

Senior career*
Years	Team	Apps	(Gls)
- Enyimba F.C.
2004	Nationale		
2005	Marsaxlokk F.C.		(1)
2007	Akwa United F.C.		
- Niger Tornadoes F.C.
- Techno Aryan
20xx-2011	Shillong Lajong F.C.		
- * Club domestic league appearances and goals

Michael Ochei (birthdate unknown; died 17 September 2014 in Ballygunge, India) was a Nigerian footballer.

== Career ==
=== Nigeria ===
Ochei started his career with Nigerian top flight side Enyimba, winning the 2003 CAF Champions League with the club.

=== Malta ===
Replacing Etienne Barbara at Marsaxlokk over the 2004/05 winter transfer window, Ochei was injured on debut, but was well enough within two months. However, he picked up a red card and a three-month ban for striking Hibernians' defender Ryan Mintoff, despite apologizing within a few days. At the end of March, the Southseasiders decided he was not part of their plans so parted company.

=== India ===
Starting out at Techno Aryan, the CAF Champions League winner stated that the Indian league had money but was still developing. Staying with Shillong Lajong until 2011, the Nigerian spent the next season with George Telegraph, earning promotion to the 2013 I-League 2nd Division and intending secure a place in the I-League.

== Personal life ==
He died on 17 September 2014. His death was announced by F.C. Hotel Sports, who gave their commiserations.
