= Chitpur =

- Neighbourhood in Kolkata (Calcutta)
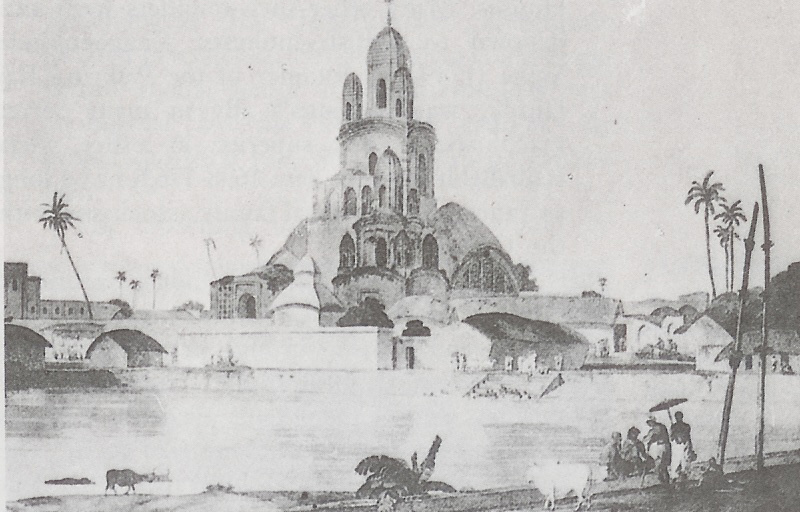
- Nabaratna Temple in 1798

- Location in Kolkata
- Coordinates: 22°34′32.58″N 88°21′04.03″E
- Country: India
- State: West Bengal
- City: Kolkata
- District: Kolkata
- Metro Station: Shyambazar
- Municipal Corporation: Kolkata Municipal Corporation
- KMC ward: 6
- Time zone: UTC+5:30 (IST)
- PIN: 700002
- Area code: +91 33
- Lok Sabha constituency: Kolkata Uttar
- Vidhan Sabha constituency: Kashipur-Belgachhia

Chitpur (or Chitpore) is a neighbourhood in North Kolkata in Kolkata district in the Indian state of West Bengal. Sometimes, the entire area along Chitpur Road is referred to as Chitpur, although the various localities have distinctive names.

== History ==
Chitpur has existed for at least 400 years. It received its name from the goddess Chitteswari, who had a splendid temple here erected by Gobindram Mitter, where human sacrifices used to be offered. The lofty dome of the temple, which was known as Nabarutna or the shrine of nine jewels, fell during the earthquake of 1737, and it is now in ruins.

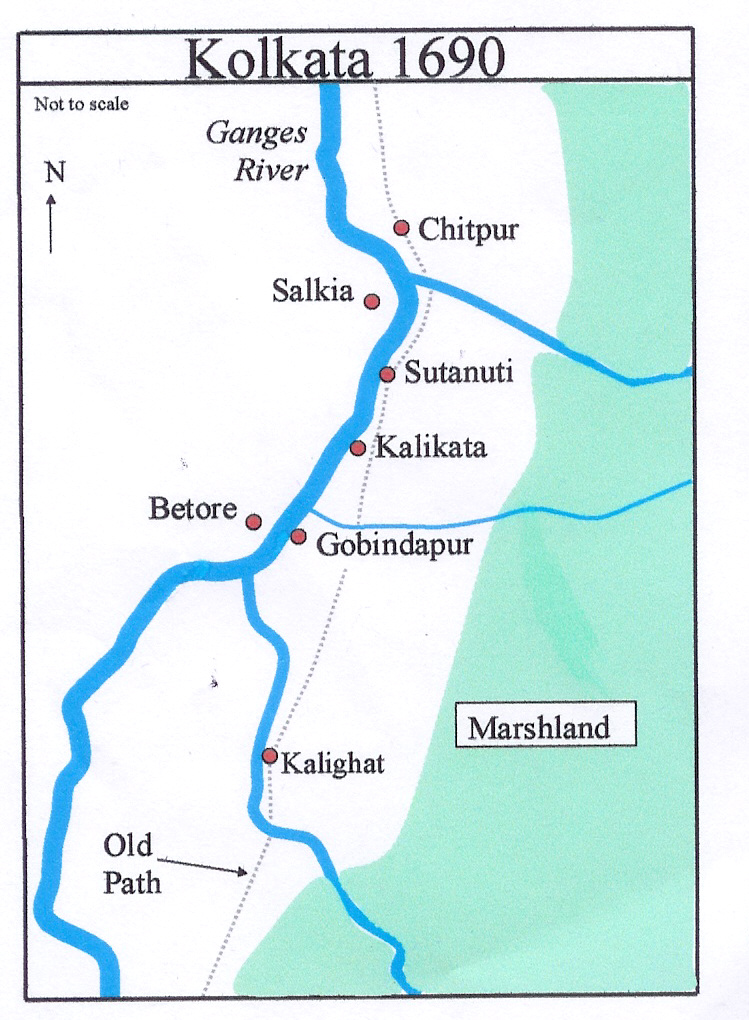

According to another source, the area was earlier named Chitrapur. It is referred to in Bipradas Pipilai's poem Manasamangal in 1495, but it could be a later interpolation. According to it, Chitpur was home to Chakrapani, Commander-in-Chief of the Nawab of Bengal's army, and had a flourishing colony of artists. It refers to one Gobinda Ghosh as founder of the Chitteswari temple in 1610. The most notorious bandit of the region was Chitey Dakat, who offered human sacrifices at the temple. The area could also have acquired its name from him.

The East India Company obtained from the Mughal emperor Farrukhsiyar, in 1717, the right to rent from 38 villages surrounding their settlement. Of these 5 lay across the Hooghly in what is now Howrah district. The remaining 33 villages were on the Calcutta side. After the fall of Siraj-ud-daulah, the last independent Nawab of Bengal, it purchased these villages in 1758 from Mir Jafar and reorganised them. These villages were known en-bloc as Dihi Panchannagram and Chitpur was one of them. It was considered to be a suburb beyond the limits of the Maratha Ditch.

There was a house and garden of Mahmed Reza Khan, the Chitpur Nawab, to whom the administration of Bengal was assigned for several years after the British East India Company acquired the dewani of Bengal from the Mughal emperors in Delhi. The Chitpur Nawab lived on terms of intimacy with the 'powers' of the day and was accounted by them as a personage of first rank. The foreign governors—Danish, French and Dutch—on their visits to Kolkata from Serampore, Chandannagar and Chinsurah, made it a practice to halt at Chitpur on their way to the Government House.

The Circular Canal joins the Hooghly River at Chitpur. Early in the 20th century a large lock and tidal basin had been constructed, at the mouth of the canal.

Entally, Manicktala, Beliaghata, Ultadanga, Chitpur, Cossipore, parts of Beniapukur, Ballygunge, Watgunge, Ekbalpur, Garden Reach and Tollygunj were added to Kolkata Municipal Corporation in 1888. Garden Reach was later taken out.

== Chitpur Road ==
The great thoroughfare, which commencing in the extreme south, assumes the various names of Russa Road, Chowringhee Road, Bentick Street, Chitpore Road, and Barrackpore Trunk Road, forms a continuation of the Dum Dum Road and was the old line of communication between Morshedabad and Kalighat. It is said to occupy the site of the old road made by the Sabarna Roy Choudhurys, the old zemindars of Calcutta, from Barisha, where the junior branch resided, to Halisahar, beyond Barrackpore, which was the seat of the senior branch.

— H.E.A.Cotton

Along that old road, popular as pilgrim's path, dharamshalas and shops came up. Habitations grew around them and localities developed. They were self-descriptive. The chicken (murgi) market (hat) was Murgihata, twin (jora) bridges (sanko) over a creek distinguished Jorasanko, butchers (kasais) slaughtered animals at Kasitola, and the potters (kumors) spun the river clay on wheels at Kumortuli. Later, they took to making clay idols in demand in the mansions that grew up all around. When the new Fort William was built in the 1750s at Gobindapur, the inhabitants of the disbanded village migrated northwards.

Chitpur Road was Kolkata's oldest road. Apart from the aristocracy, there have been common folks engaged in various trades. The distinctive Bengali panjika almanac was printed here. It was a centre for Battala books. So many things on Chitpore Road have been an integral part of Bengal's life and culture – the paan (betel leaf mouth refresher), the adda (stray gossiping), jatra shows and the brass band playing "He is a jolly good fellow" to enliven wedding receptions.

A part of Lower Chitpur Road rivalled the Chandni Chowk of Delhi before construction of Nakhoda Mosque in 1926. The last vestiges of Nawabi style were found along Chitpur Road. It was on this road that Raja Rammohun Roy built his Brahmo Sabha, which later became Adi Brahmo Samaj. The road was renamed Rabindra Sarani, after its most famous resident, Rabindranath Tagore. It is Kolkata's museum with communities and social groups from various parts of country and beyond finding a place in nooks along the road.

Jorasanko Thakur Bari, the home of the Tagore family now houses Rabindra Bharati University.

== Corporation ward ==
In 1876, the peripheral areas of Kolkata were brought under the umbrella of a single Suburban Municipality. In 1889, the suburban area was split into five units of which one was the Suburban Municipality of Kashipur and Chitpur. In 1931, it was merged with Kolkata. Chitpur now forms ward no. 6 of Kolkata Municipal Corporation. With the Hooghly River on the west, it is surrounded by Cossipore, Bagbazar, Paikpara, Tala, Belgachia and Shyambazar on the other three sides. Across the Hooghly River is Salkia in Howrah.

== Police district ==
Chitpur police station is part of the North and North Suburban division of Kolkata Police. Located at 19, Cossipore Road, Kolkata-700002, it has jurisdiction over Chitpur neighbourhood/ Ward no. 6, of Kolkata Municipal Corporation.

Amherst Street Women police station covers all police districts under the jurisdiction of the North and North Suburban division i.e. Amherst Street, Jorabagan, Shyampukur, Cossipore, Chitpur, Sinthi, Burtolla and Tala.

== Railway passenger terminal ==
Chitpur is home to Kolkata railway station, the fourth and latest railway passenger terminal for the city. The first two stations, Howrah and Sealdah, were built more than a century ago and now both of them have reached the saturation point in capacity. The third one, Shalimar, which is under jurisdiction of South Eastern Railway, is located in Howrah, far away from the city centre. The new terminal has been named "Kolkata".

== Transport ==
Cossipore Road (Sri Sri Ramakrishna Paramahansa Dev Sarani) is the artery of Chitpur. Buses ply along the road. The road is connected to B.T. Road (at Chunni Babu Bazar) with Lock Gate Road Overbridge. It is also connected to Bagbazar (Khirode Vidyavinode Avenue) with Chitpur Bridge over a canal. Chitpur Bridge was firstly inaugurated in 1937.

=== Bus ===
==== Private Bus ====
- 34B Dunlop - Esplanade
- 43 Dakshineswar - Esplanade
- 242 Cossipore 4B - Esplanade

==== CSTC Bus ====
- S17A Ariadaha - Kudghat

=== Train ===
Besides Kolkata Station, Tala railway station and Bagbazar railway station (both are on Kolkata Circular Railway line) are also located nearby.

== In popular culture ==
Chitpur is the setting for the 2012 Malayalam novel Aarachaar (transl. Hangwoman) by K. R. Meera, which won many awards.
