= Ballygunge =

- Neighbourhood
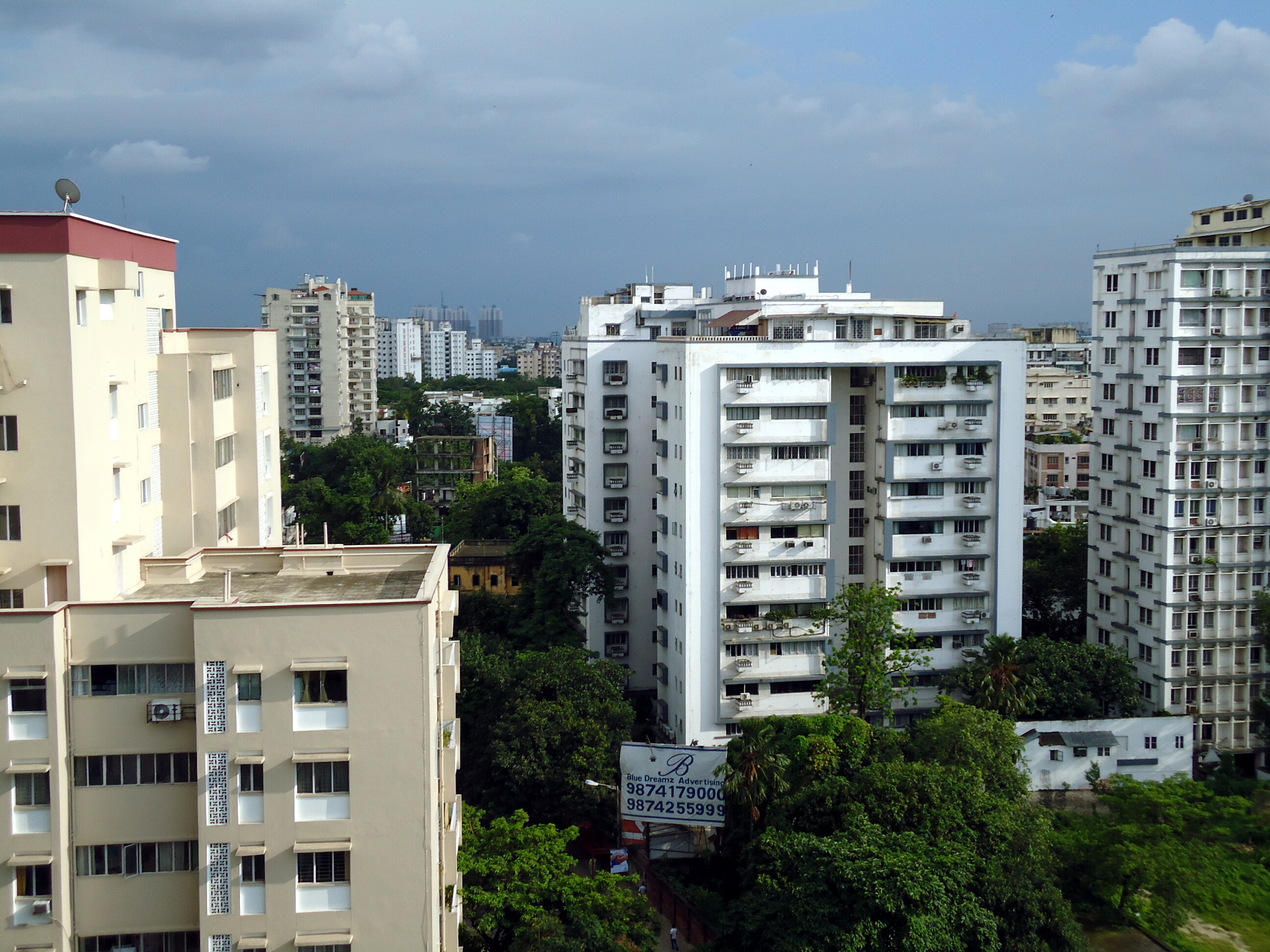
- Ballygunge Circular Road

- Location in Kolkata
- Coordinates: 22.529°N 88.362°E
- Country: India
- State: West Bengal
- City: Kolkata
- District: Kolkata
- Kolkata Suburban Railway: Ballygunge Junction
- Metro Station: Jatin Das Park; Kalighat; Kavi Sukanta; Hemanta Mukherjee
- Municipal Corporation: Kolkata Municipal Corporation
- KMC wards: 65, 68, 69, 85, 86, 90

Population
  - Total: For population see linked KMC ward pages
- Time zone: UTC+5:30 (IST)
- Area code: +91 33
- Lok Sabha constituency: Kolkata Dakshin
- Vidhan Sabha constituency: Ballygunge, Rashbehari

Ballygunge (Bengali: বালিগঞ্জ) locality of South Kolkata in Kolkata district in the Indian state of West Bengal. It is one of the city's most affluent neighbourhoods.

== History ==
The East India Company obtained from the Mughal emperor Farrukhsiyar, in 1717, the right to rent from 38 villages surrounding their settlement. Of these 5 lay across the Hooghly in what is now Howrah district. The remaining 33 villages were on the Calcutta side. After the fall of Siraj-ud-daulah, the last independent Nawab of Bengal, it purchased these villages in 1758 from Mir Jafar, and reorganised them. These villages were known en-bloc as Dihi Panchannagram and Ballygunge was one of them. It was considered to be a suburb beyond the limits of the Maratha Ditch. Beltala was a village in Dihi Mohanpur (later Monoharpukur).

Ballygunge grew up around a market for sand (bali in Bengali) and had garden-houses of 18th century Europeans. Amongst the prominent residents were George Mandeville, the zamindar/ collector, and Colonel Gilbert Ironside, a friend of Warren Hastings. In 1840, Emily Eden called Ballygunge 'our Eltham or Lewisham'. It also emerged as a citadel of the educated Bengali middle class after the suburban railway opened up the area.

In 1888, Ballygunge and Tollygunge had a combined thana (police station).

Entally, Manicktala, Beliaghata, Ultadanga, Chitpur, Cossipore, parts of Beniapukur, Ballygunge, Watgunge and Ekbalpur, and parts of Garden Reach and Tollygunge were added to Kolkata Municipal Corporation in 1888. Garden Reach was later taken out.

When the Bengal Renaissance started taking roots in 19th century Calcutta, it was initially limited to the predominantly Hindu 'Indian town' stretching north and north-east from the fringes of Burrabazar, with a somewhat later extension south and south-east of the 'European town' to Bhowanipore, and some decades later to Ballygunge, which was then developing as a suburb.

In the first half of the 20th century, "in the milieu of relative urban prosperity... Calcutta's rich citizens – those connected with jute, coal, tea, other industries, trade, money-lending and rentier income from urban property – did fabulously well for themselves." Large chunks of Ballygunge, Sunny Park, Rainey Park and Southern Avenue were developed during the 1930s and 1940s. Many of the mansions in Ballygunge, Bhowanipore and Alipore were built by the city's Bengali and new Marwari elite who wanted to move from the "dirtier sections of north Calcutta to the more fashionable areas in the south".

== Geography ==
=== Location ===
Ballygunge is flanked by Park Circus in the north, Kasba and the Eastern Railway south suburban line in the east, Dhakuria and the Lakes (now called Rabindra Sarobar) in the south, and the localities of Bhowanipore and Lansdowne in the west. It is served by Ballygunge Junction railway station.

=== Police districts ===
The following police stations in the Ballygunge area, which are part of the South-east division of Kolkata Police, cover four police districts in the area:

Rabindra Sarobar police station is a new police station being set up in the Rabindra Sarobar area.

Karaya Women police station, has jurisdiction over all police districts under the jurisdiction of the South-east division, i.e. Topsia, Beniapukur, Ballygunge, Gariahat, Lake, Karaya, Rabindra Sarobar and Tiljala.

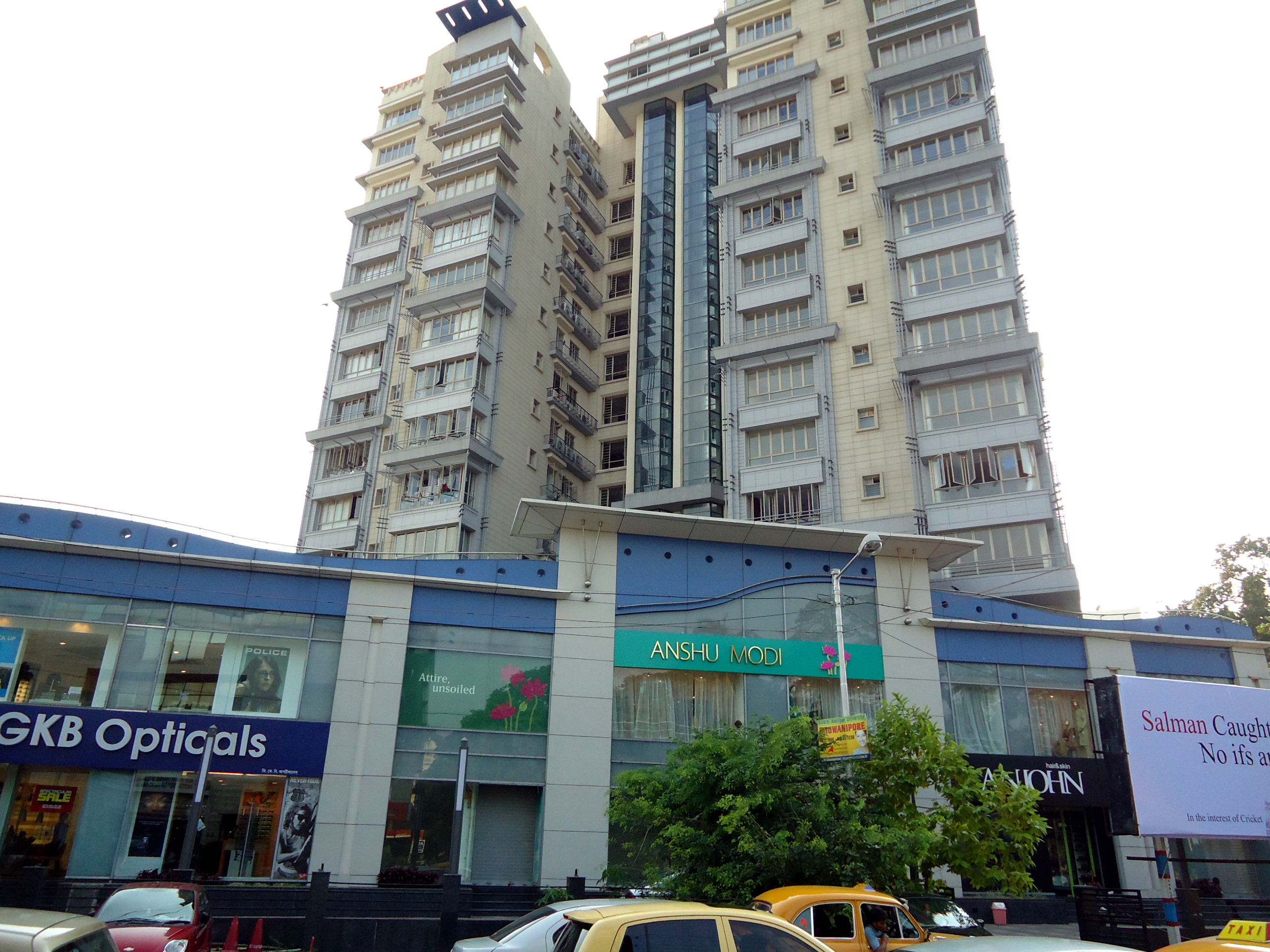
Astral Apts & Atria Shopping Plaza

1. Birla Industrial & Technological Museum
2. Calcutta Cricket and Football Club
3. Birla Park (residential estate of The Birlas)
4. 'The Empire' Complex
5. Tagore Hall
6. Kusum Apartments
7. Uniworth House (houses Mainland China restaurant)
8. Astral Apartments & Atria Shopping Plaza
9. Isckon House

== Economy ==
=== Gariahat Market ===
Gariahat market, spread along Rashbehari Avenue, Gariahat Road and the lanes in the area, is one of the largest and busiest markets in Kolkata. The shops sell variety of saris, clothes, jewellery, electronic goods, furniture and what not. The makeshift shops along the footpaths, popular as hawkers, sell everything – crockery, cutlery, decorative items and utilities. It has numerous eateries and street food joints. Modern malls have also come up. Gariahat market is also well known for selling fish which is a staple for the Bengali community living in Calcutta.

=== Shopping malls ===
Quest Mall, located on Syed Amir Ali Avenue near Ballygunge, is a major shopping mall featuring national and international fashion brands, restaurants and a multiplex.

The Gariahat Mall, situated on Jamir Lane in the Ballygunge area, provides retail outlets for fashion and lifestyle products.

Gariahat Shopping Complex, located in the adjoining Gariahat commercial area, is a shopping destination known for clothing, textiles and other retail goods.

== Education ==
Ballygunge is home to some of the following educational institutions in Kolkata:

- Army Public School, Kolkata, Ballygunge Maidan Camp
- Kendriya Vidyalaya Ballygunge, Kolkata, Ballygunge Maidan Camp
- National High School Hazra Road Campus, 42/1 Hazra Road, Kolkata - 700019
- Ballygunge Government High School, Beltala
- Basanti Devi College, 147B Rash Behari Avenue, Kolkata
- Muralidhar Girls' College, P411, 14, Gariahat Rd, Golpark, Hindustan Park, Ballygunge, Kolkata, West Bengal 700029
- Jagadbandhu Institution, 25, Fern Road, Kolkata.
- Kamala Girls' High School, Lake Road (Kavi Bharati Sarani)
- Patha Bhavan, Swinhoe Street, Ekdalia Road, Palm Avenue, Ballygunge Place and Merlin Park
- South Point School, Mandeville Gardens and Ballygunge Place
- St. Lawrence High School, Ballygunge Circular Road

== Transport ==
Two famous bus routes of Ballygunge area operated by WBTC are:

- S-10A (Ballygunge - Howrah Stn)
- S-9A (Ballygunge - Dunlop)
- S-2B (Ballygunge - Bagbazar)

Other WBTC Bus routes are:

- AC-24 (Patuli - Howrah Stn)
- AC-24A (Kamalgazi - Howrah Stn)
- AC-47 (Kudghat - Shapoorji)
- AC-4B (Joka - Newtown)
- AC-49 (Parnasree - Ecospace)
- C-8 (Joka - Barasat)
- EB-3 (Tollygunge Tram Depot - Ecospace)
- M-14 (Behala 14 no. Bus stand - New Town)
- S-3W (Joka - Ecospace)
- S-4 (Parnasree - Karunamoyee)
- S-22 (Shakuntala Park - Karunamoyee)
- S-46 (Rabindra Nagar - Karunamoyee)
- V-1 (Tollygunge Tram Depot - Airport)
- S-62 (Ramnagar - Patuli)

== Metro ==
Ballygunge is located within reach of several Kolkata Metro stations in neighbouring localities. These include Netaji Bhavan, Rabindra Sadan, Kalighat and Jatin Das Park on the Blue Line, and Kavi Sukanta on the Orange Line. The nearest station varies according to the particular part of Ballygunge; these stations should not be described as being within the neighbourhood without a reliable source establishing their locations.

=== Future developments ===
Metro connectivity around Ballygunge is expected to benefit from the continued expansion of the Kolkata Metro network. The Purple Line (Joka–Esplanade corridor) is being extended beyond Majerhat towards Esplanade. The 6.26-kilometre section between Majerhat and Esplanade was reported to be under construction by the Ministry of Railways in December 2025. In July 2026, tunnelling work on the underground section between Khidderpore and Victoria reached a major milestone.

The Orange Line (New Garia–Airport corridor) is also being extended beyond Beleghata towards Salt Lake Sector V and, ultimately, the airport. Trial runs on the Beleghata–IT Centre section began in October 2026. This corridor provides a potential additional access route for eastern Kolkata, although it does not pass through Ballygunge itself.

== Notable Resident ==
- Sarat Chandra Chattopadhyay novelist and short story writer,
- Buddhadeb Bhattacharjee – former Chief Minister of West Bengal.
- Prosenjit Chatterjee – Bengali film actor.
- Abhijit Banerjee – economist and Nobel laureate; has a residence on Ballygunge Circular Road.
