= 2007 Kolkata riots =

Riots in Kolkata, India

The 2007 Kolkata riots took place in Kolkata on 21 November 2007, when Muslim anti-Taslima protesters under the banner of All India Minority Forum blockaded major portions of central Kolkata and resorted to arson and violence. The Left Front led State Government deployed the army in the afternoon of that day.

== Background ==
On 17 August, Muslim clerics in Kolkata issued death warrant against Bangladeshi writer Taslima Nasreen.

== Events ==
Several media persons from television channels were hurt due to stone pelting. The rioters set fire to two party offices of the ruling party Communist Party of India (Marxist). The violence led to severe traffic snarls during the morning rush hour. Most of the violence was concentrated in the Muslim Majority neighbourhoods of Central and East Kolkata. Park Circus Area, Topsia, Tiljala, Tangra, Park Street- MullickBazar, Eliot Road, Ripon Street, Royd Street, Colin Street, Marquis Street, Raja Bazar, Sealdah, Moulali, C.I.T.Road and adjoining areas of John Burdon Sanderson Haldane Avenue (Park Circus Connector). North and South Kolkata were largely peaceful and curfew was not extended to those areas.

As the streets of Kolkata turned into a combat zone, the State Government requisitioned ten platoons of the army. At 3 PM, four platoons of the army, each comprising 100 to 120 soldiers marched into the city from Fort William. 3 flag marches were conducted that evening. Four more platoons were preparing to move soon. Idris Ali of the Minority Forum was the mastermind. Deputy Commissioner of Police (Central Zone) Meeraj Khalid opened fire on a group of arsonists at Eliot Road. In total 6 rounds were fired and 3 people were grievously injured. Brigadier Solanki imposed martial law at 4 pm. The curfew was strictly enforced.

Withdrawal of curfew was done in a phased manner the following day after Governor Gopalakrishna Gandhi met top communist and opposition leaders. The Home Ministry's opinion was sought and Rashtrapati Bhawan kept informed. Martial Law ended the next afternoon and normalcy was restored by evening. The Army organised a final flag march from Wellington to Raj Bhawan. Battalions of Eastern Frontier Rifles remained on standby for the next month. Idris Ali was arrested that evening and sent to Presidency Prison. The West Bengal Government was praised for its handling of the situation. Governor Gandhi gave a publicly broadcast speech to appeal for communal calm.

== Aftermath ==
Two months after the incident, Dharmamukta Manabbadi Mancha, an organization of secular Muslims, held a press conference at the Press Club in Kolkata in protest of the expulsion of Taslima Nasreen from Kolkata.
