= Kalikata =

Former village in Kolkata, India

Coordinates: 22°34′N 88°22′E

Kalikata was one of the three villages which were merged to form the city of Kolkata (formerly Calcutta) in India. The other two villages were Gobindapur and Sutanuti. Job Charnock, an administrator with the British East India Company is traditionally credited with the honour of founding the city. He settled in the village of Sutanuti.

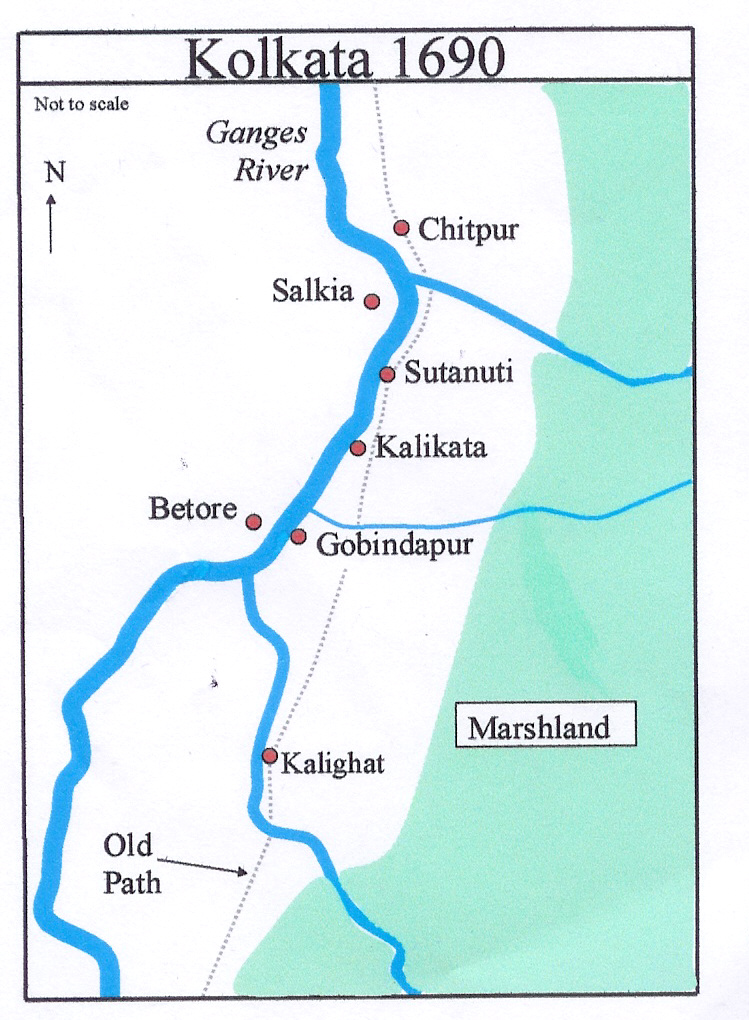
Kalikata in the Map of Calcutta (1690)

A handful of merchants began their operations by building a few factories near the coastal area, one of which was established near the fishing village Kalikata, which was about a hundred miles above the mouth of the Ganges, known as Hooghly. The factory was erected in the vicinity of the celebrated hindu Kalighat Kali Temple. That fishing village is now the famous city of Kolkata, which had received this appellation from the idol temple. While both Sutanati and Gobindapur appear on old maps like Thomas Bowrey's of 1687 and George Herron's of 1690, Kalikata situated between the two is not depicted. However, one variant of the name, "Kalkatâ", is shown in Abu'l Fazal's Ain-i-Akbari (around 1590).

== History ==
English trader Job Charnock landed at Sutanuti on 24 August 1690 with the objective of establishing the East India Company's Bengal headquarters. As Kalikata did not have any settled native population, it was easy for the British to occupy the site. In 1696, construction of old Fort William began (near the site of the present-day General Post Office) without legal title to the land. Legal title was eventually secured on 10 November 1698 when Charles Eyre, Job Charnock's son-in-law and ultimate successor, acquired the zemindari (land-holding) rights from the Sabarna Roy Choudhury family, the zemindars (landlords) of the area. It is from this date that Kolkata came legally under English control. (At this time, the Mughal empire was still strong, under Aurangzeb).

It is not clear when the Sabarna Roy Choudhury family acquired the village of Kalikata, but they acquired a vast acreage by grant allegedly in 1608 from Raja Man Singh, a maternal cousin of the reigning Mughal emperor Jahangir. However, other sources state that a progenitor only impressed Man Singh in 1612. The Sabarna Roy Choudhury's own tenure of the three villages – Kalikata, Sutanuti, and Gobindapur – is thus of uncertain duration, although in 1698, they were certainly the zemindars, or landlords, with their lands acquired through some sort of grant or lease from the Mughal emperors. They were apparently reluctant to transfer their rights as landlords but were forced to do so under pressure from the Mughal court.

In Colonel Mark Wood's map of 1784, published in 1792 by William Baillie, Dhee or Dihi (meaning village or group of villages) Kalikata is shown as extending from Jorabagan Ghat to Baboo ghat.

Kalikata was called "Calcutta" by the British and the metropolis that grew around it acquired that name; it was renamed Kolkata in 2001, following colloquial Bengali.

=== White Town ===
According to H.E.A. Cotton, "The pivot of the settlement must be sought in what is now Dalhousie Square, but was then known as the Lall Bagh or Park. In the centre was the Lal Dighi, or great Tank, which has been in existence before the coming of Charnock within what was the cutcherry (court-house) of the former zemindars (landlords)… There was no Strand Road, and the waves of the Hooghly lapped the ramparts of the Fort. To the south there extended from Koila Ghat to Chandpal Ghat the mouth of a creek, navigable for large boats, which passed along Hastings Street and made way through Creek Row and Wellington Square to Beliaghata near the Salt Lakes… Beyond Chitpore Road, which formed the eastern boundary of the settlement, lay more pools, swamps and rice-fields, dotted here and there with the struggling huts of fishermen, falconers, wood-cutters, weavers and cultivators." That in short was Kalikata in the early 18th century. As Calcutta became settled Sutanuti was gradually abandoned by the English as a place of abode.

As the English withdrew to "White Town" restricted mostly to the north of the old fort, the sharp division was sealed with "Black Town" spread over Sutanuti, Chitpur and Gobindapur.

=== Battles fought around Kalikata ===
Siraj ud-Daulah, the Nawab of Bengal, was alarmed by the growing prosperity and enhanced fortifications of Kolkata. In 1756, he decided to attack Kolkata. After capturing Kolkata, Siraj ud-Daula named it Alinagar, after his grandfather Alivardi Khan. The name of Kolkata was restored in 1758, after the British regained control of Bengal. "To the English indeed, the sack of Kolkata must have appeared little short of devastation. But in fact, of the four contiguous villages of Gobindapur, Kalikata, Sutanuti and Chitpur, only Kalikata or "White" Calcutta suffered extensively… The Black Town escaped major damage, except the burning down of Barabazar… Gobindapur had been fired by the English themselves." The English evacuees set up temporary quarters at Falta, some 40 miles downstream. What followed was a series of skirmishes finally leading to the Battle of Plassey on 23 June 1757 and the establishment of British power in Bengal.

The re-establishment of British power was followed by the construction of the new Fort William, in 1758 and the demolition of Gobindapur. The Indians moved out mostly to the north. European inhabitants gradually forsook the narrow limits of the old palisades and moved to around the Maidan.

The most important public buildings and imposing private houses lined the northern side of the Esplanade, facing the Maidan on the south. "Esplanade Row," wrote Mrs. Fay, "seems to be composed of palaces." The movement of the white population was then directed towards Chaurangi, then a small village, and away from such areas as Baitakkhana (Bowbazar), Dharmatala and Janbazar. The latter areas were taken over by "the rest", which included half-castes, Portuguese and Armenians, to become a grey area between Black and White towns.

As the metropolis grew with the passage of time, it absorbed the original village which was subsumed under the emerging city.
