= Bipradas Pipilai =

15th-century poet

Bipradas Pipilai was a 15th-century poet. He was the son of Mukunda Pipilai, the family hailed from Baduria-Batagram in 24 Parganas, now in the Indian state of West Bengal.

== The Manasa Vijay ==
He was one of the poets who contributed to the Manasamangal genre of poems in praise of the serpent-goddess, Manasa. So far, three of his manuscripts have been discovered. Initially, an incomplete version of his work was edited and published by Haraprasad Shastri in 1897 based on two manuscripts discovered till then. In 1953, a complete version of the text was edited and published by Sukumar Sen under the title Vipradāsa's Manasā-Vijaya, as part of the Bibliotheca Indica series of the Asiatic Society, Calcutta. It was based on all three manuscripts. In these manuscripts, the date of his work is found as 1417 Saka era (1495-96). Bijay Gupta of Barisal wrote his Manasamangal at around the same time.

Bipradas is particularly well known for his vivid description of the journeys of the merchant Chand Sadagar, giving details of Saptagram and the lower reaches of the Hooghly-Saraswati rivers.
