= Sutanuti =

Village in West Bengal, India

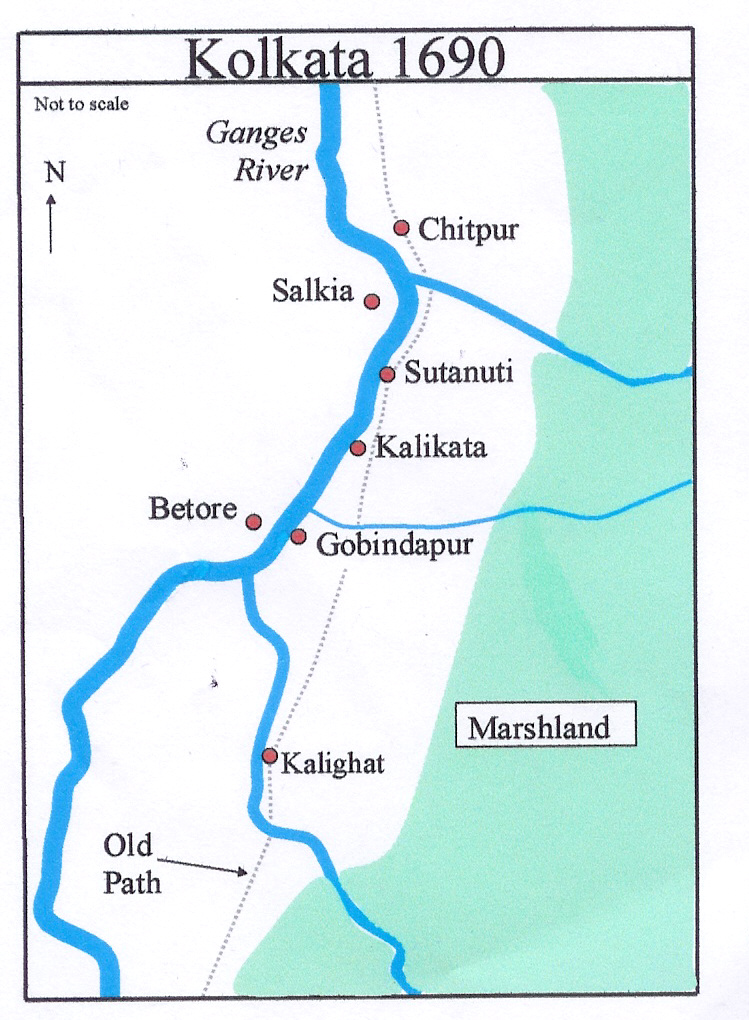
Sutanuti on map of Calcutta (1690)

Sutanuti was one of the three villages which were merged to form the city of Kolkata (formerly known as Calcutta) in India, along with Gobindapur and Kalikata. Sutanuti was set up, by the first British settlers, along the banks of the Hooghly river, which is a tributary of the Ganges river.

The British had bribed Mughal officials into granting rights of three cities, Gobindapur, Sutanuti and Kalikata, to the British East India Company in 1651. The British built a factory and warehouse there, where goods for export were stored, and many offices were built where company officials sat. This became the base for the company's trades, known as factors. As trade increased the company persuaded merchants and traders to settle there. Suta in Bengali means thread and soon Sutanuti came the patronage of the East India company.

By 1696 the British had started building fortifications there, which eventually led to the Battle of Plassey in 1757. The factory eventually turned into Fort William.

Eventually the village grew and merged with the other two settlements to form Kolkata. Sutanuti is now part of North Kolkata.

In recent years, a restaurant by name Sutanuti 1910 came up and became popular by 2022.

== See also ==
- European colonies in India
