= Dhakeshwari Temple =

Hindu temple in Dhaka, Bangladesh

Dhakeshwari National Temple
- ঢাকেশ্বরী জাতীয় মন্দির
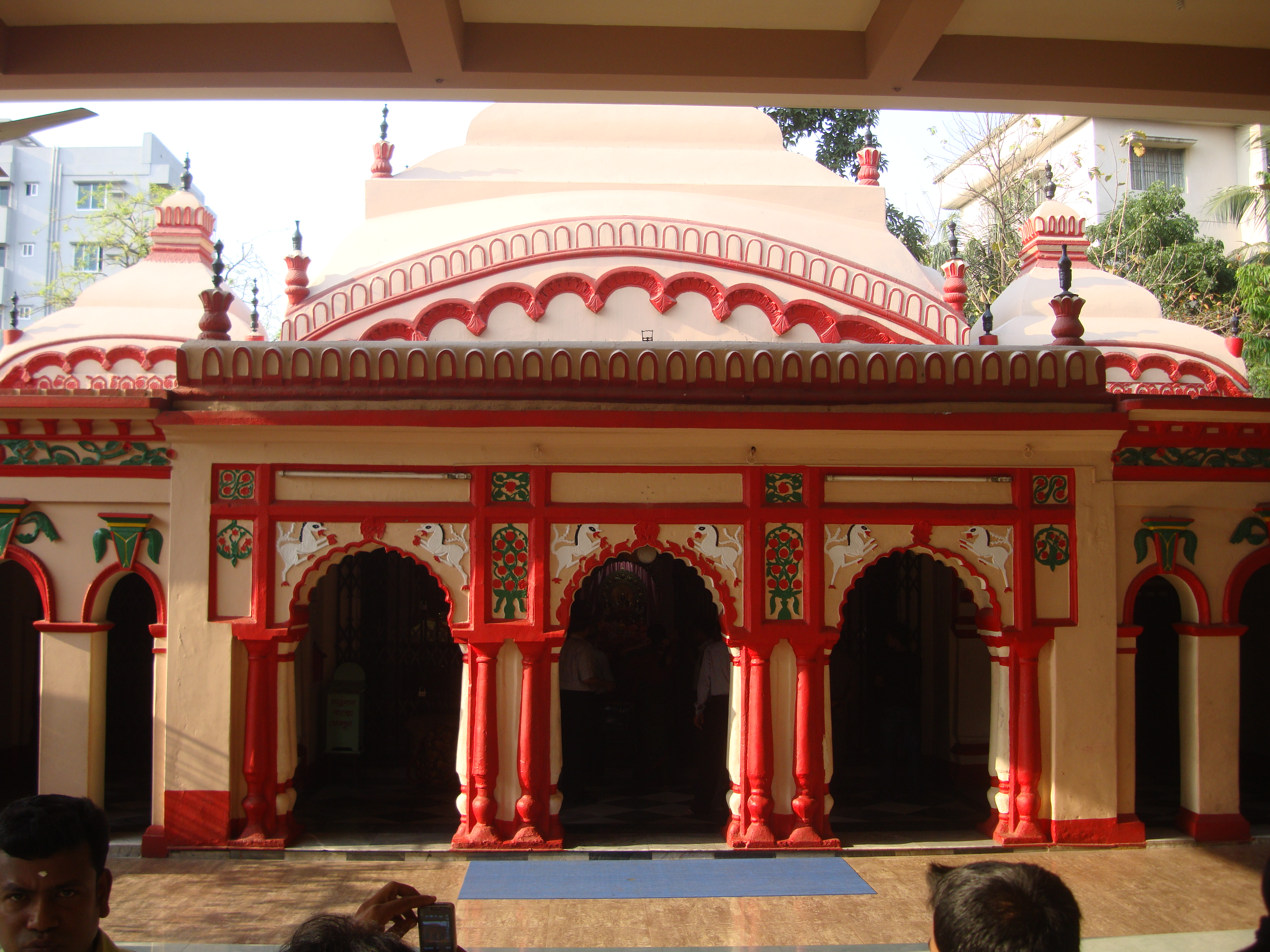
- Dhakeshwari Temple

- Location within Bangladesh

Religion
- Affiliation: Hinduism
- District: Dhaka District
- Deity: Dhakeshwari

Location
- Location: Bakshi Bazar, Dhakeshwari Road, Dhaka
- State: Dhaka Division
- Country: Bangladesh
- Coordinates: 23°43′21.38″N 90°23′24.08″E

Architecture
- Type: Sena
- Creator: Ballal Sen
- Completed: 12th century CE

Dhakeshwari National Temple (Bengali: ঢাকেশ্বরী জাতীয় মন্দির) is a Hindu temple in Old Dhaka, Bangladesh. It is state-owned, giving it the distinction of being Bangladesh's 'National Temple'. The name "Dhakeshwari" (ঢাকেশ্বরী Ðhakeshshori) means "Goddess of Dhaka". Dhaka is named after Goddess Dhakeshwari. Bangladesh is the only Muslim majority country in the world to have a National Hindu Temple.

According to the Hindu religion, this temple is one of the holiest shakta pithas where the gem of Devi Sati's crown fell but the gem was lost long ago and the main ancient metal Vigraha murti was relocated to Kumortuli, West Bengal during partition by the chief priest due to increased attacks on Hindu temples in Bangladesh. Till now the main idol is worshipped in Kolkata and a replica of the same is being worshiped at Dhakeshwari Temple of Bangladesh.

Since the destruction of Ramna Kali Mandir in 1971 by the Pakistan Army during the Bangladesh Liberation War, the Dhakeshwari Temple has assumed status as the most important Hindu place of worship in Bangladesh. It is also the largest Hindu temple in Bangladesh.

== History ==
The Dhakeshwari (Durga) temple was built in the 12th century, 1100 A.D. by Ballal Sen, a king of the Sena dynasty, and it is said that the city Dhaka was named after the Goddess. The current architectural style of the temple cannot be dated to that period because of the numerous repairs, renovations, and rebuilding which have taken place over time. It is considered an essential part of Dhaka's cultural heritage. It is one of the Shakta pithas, where the jewel from the crown of the Goddess Sati had fallen. For ages, the temple has been held in great importance. The original 900-year-old idol was taken to Kumartuli, Kolkata, West Bengal, India. During the partition of India, the idol was brought to Kolkata from Dhaka with millions of Bengali Hindu refugees from East Bengal (now Bangladesh) of Pakistan.

By 1950, the businessman Debendranath Chaudhary built the temple of Goddess in Kumortuli area and established some of the Goddess' property for its daily services. The idol is 1.5 feet tall, has ten arms, mounted on her lion in the form of Katyani Mahishasurmardini 'Durga'. On its two sides are Laxmi, Saraswati, Kartik and Ganesha. A Tiwari family from Azamgarh was appointed by the royal family for daily worship of the deity. In 1946, the descendants of that family came to Calcutta and were re-appointed, where they still serve the Goddess continuously.

Current presiding deity here in Dhakeshwari Temple is the replica of the original idol.

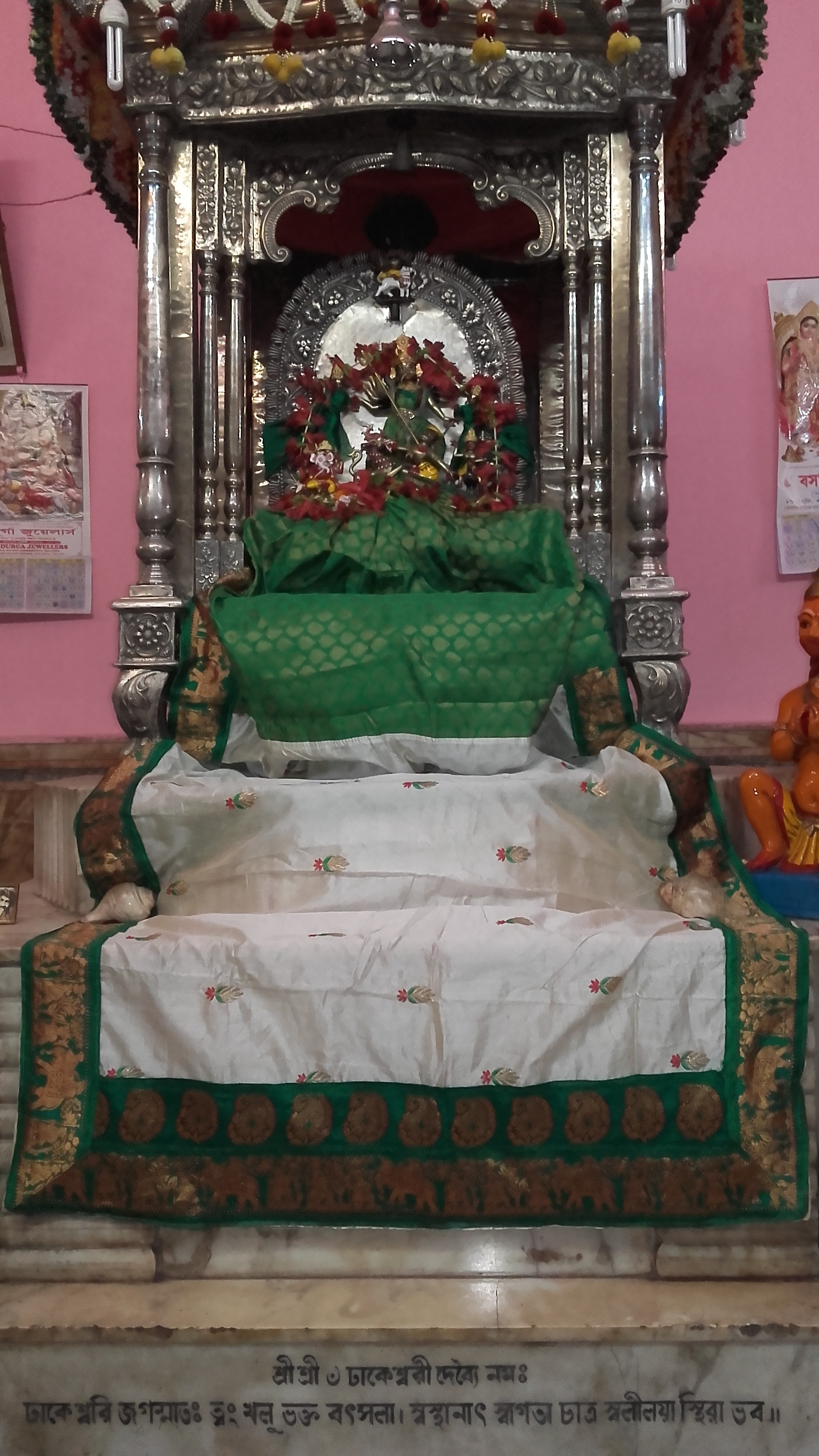
Original: The Goddess statue at the Dhakeshwari Mata Temple in Kolkata

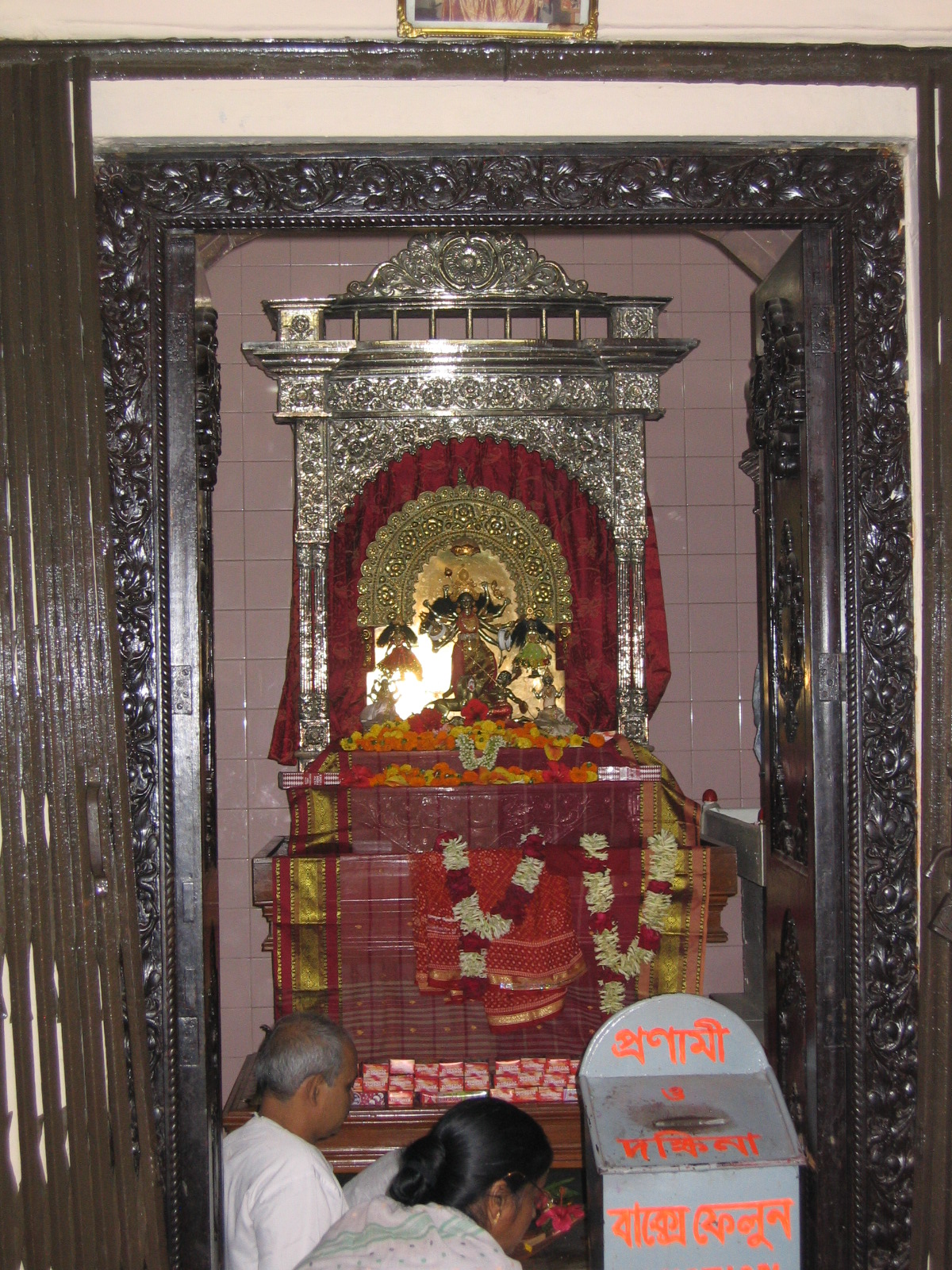
Replica: The Goddess statue at the Dhakeshwari Temple in Dhaka

Dhakeswori Mata Idol in Kolkata and Dhaka

It is widely believed that the wife of King Vijaya Sena went to Langolbond for bathing. On her way back she gave birth to a son, known as Ballal Sen.

== Structure ==
=== Exterior view ===
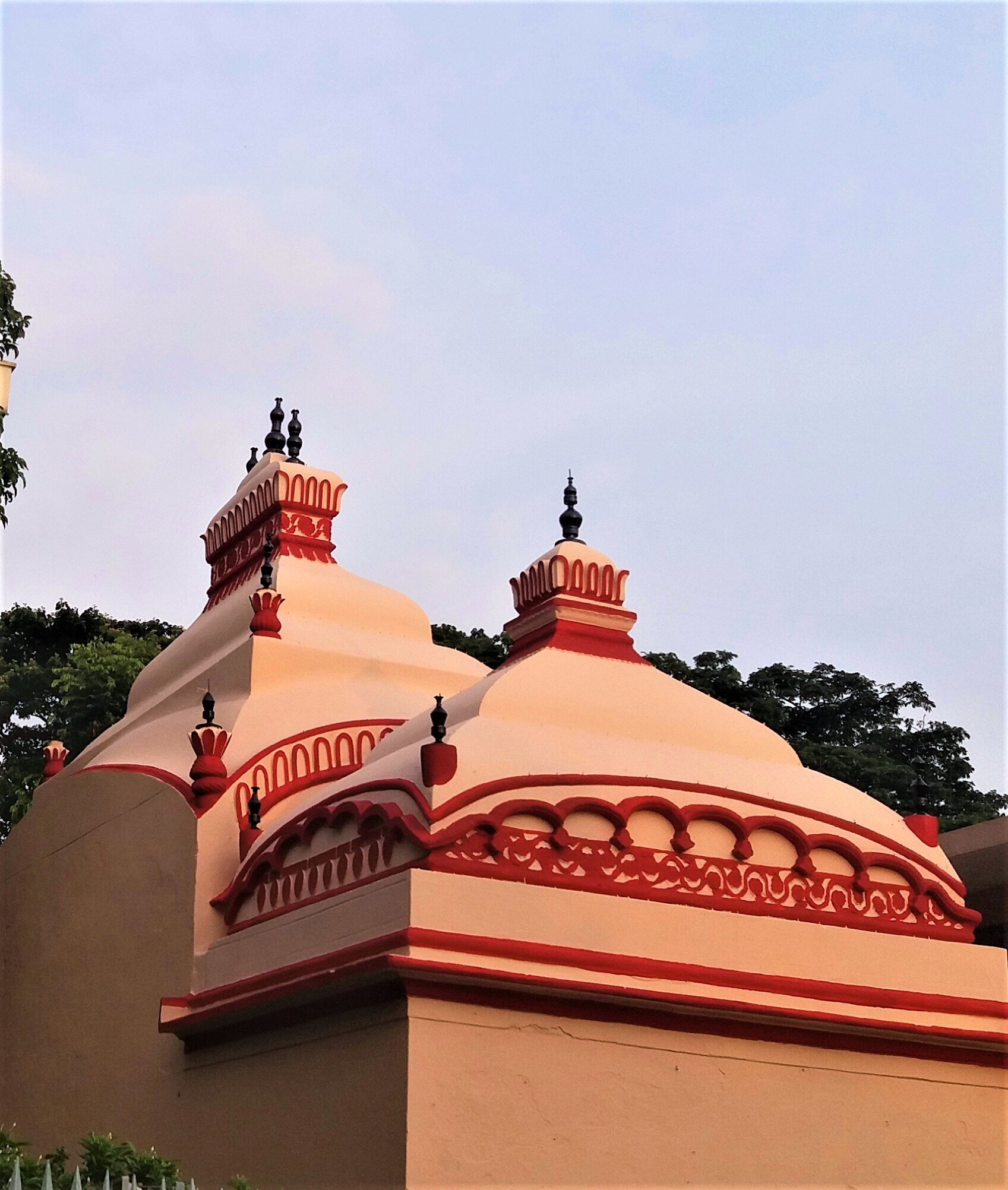
Main temple structure

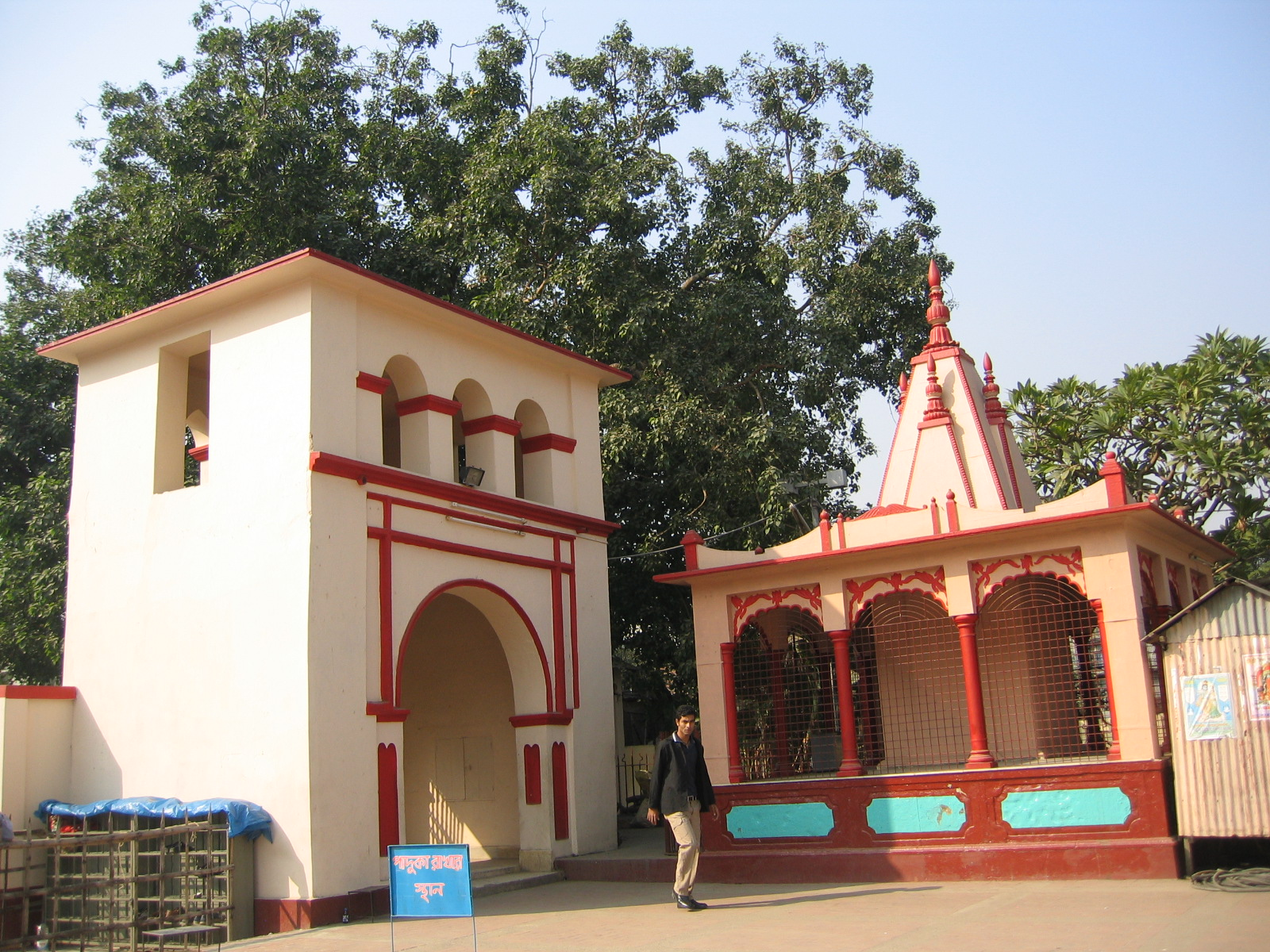
Entrance to the main temple compound

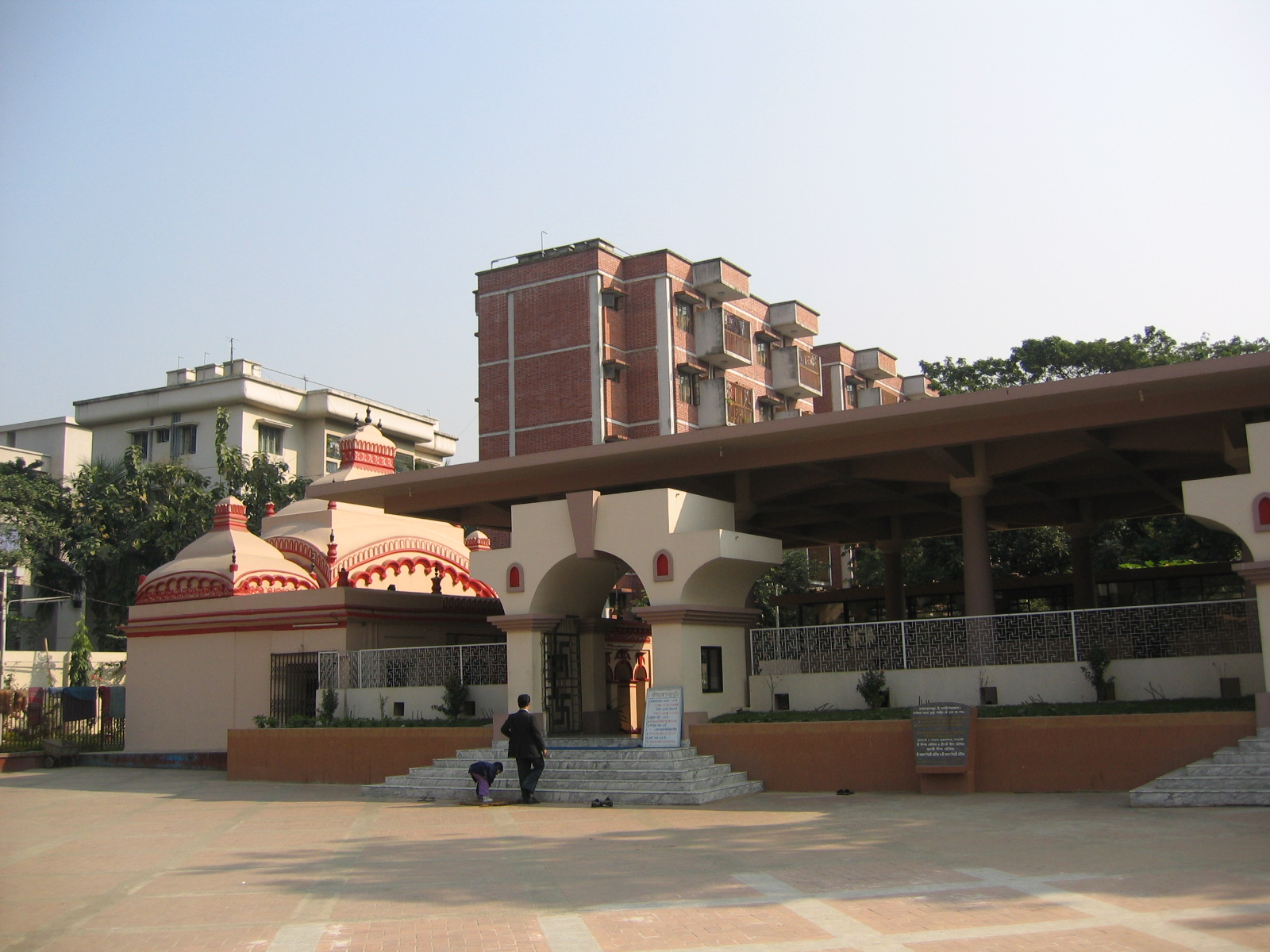
Main temple structure from the west side

Within the premises of the Dhakeswari there are temples of two types of architecture. The ancient one is of the Pancharatna Goddess Durga's which lost its actual look after the renovation work. Bradly Bird wrote this at the beginning of this century. Other than this there are four Shiv Temples.

Dhakeshwari Temple in the 19th century is described by Ridoynath Majumder. He wrote that it was overgrown by jungle and in its north the Urdu road went westward towards Pilkhana and at its south west was Mirpur road. At its south there was a wood and Urdu bazar was at the east.

=== Interior view ===
The temple was panchoratno, at its front Natamandir and around it there is a row of rooms and a big pond and nahobottola gate through which elephants used to pass. To the east there are tombs of some saints who used to pray or meditate at the temple. Outside the temple there are 5–6 pagodas with a shib linga. The priest of Dhakeshwari temple used pray every day. It is believed that the representation of the deity is made of gold. At the left and right side of the deity there are some other murti. Like many ancient temples its inside is dark. To see the deity light is to be arranged.

== Declaration as National Temple of Bangladesh ==
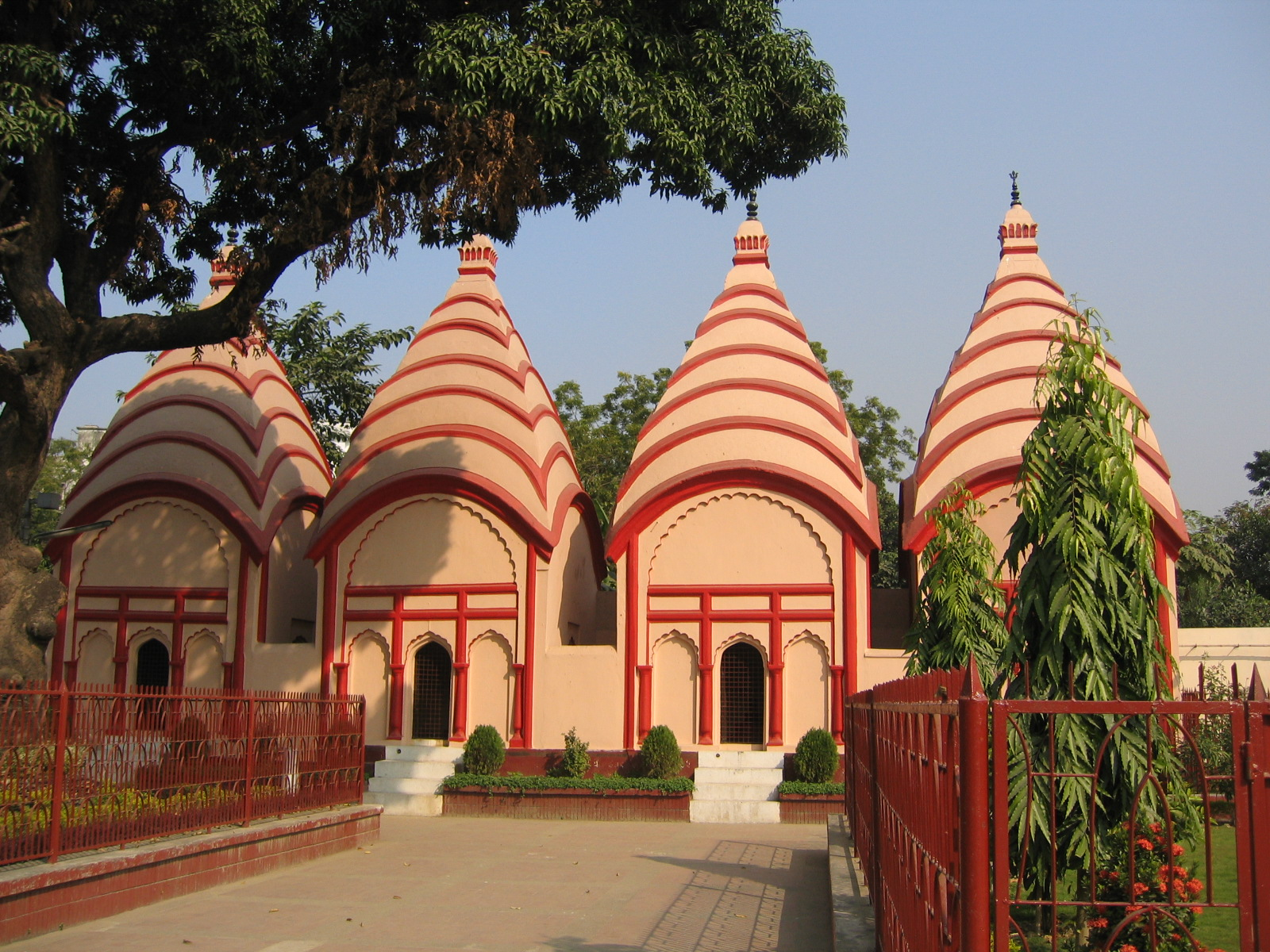
Shiva temples in Dhakeshwari Mandir

In 1996, Dhakeshwari Temple was renamed Dhakeshwari Jatiya Mandir (National Temple) reflecting its position as the centre of Hindu culture and worship in Bangladesh. This was the culmination of a major campaign by Bangladeshi Hindu groups who had been demanding official recognition for the primary Hindu place of worship following the declaration of Islam as the state religion in 1988. As a result, the flag of Bangladesh is hoisted every morning outside the main temple premises, and it follows the National Flag Code rules such as rendering half-mast on nationally declared days of mourning.

As is the practice in other leading religious places of worship in Bangladesh, day-long prayers are common practice during important national holidays such as Independence Day, Language Martyrs' Day, Victory Day and birth and death anniversaries of former leaders such as Sheikh Mujibur Rahman and Ziaur Rahman.

== Threats to temple security ==
Historically, several of the temple custodians were tortured and killed by the Army though most, including the Head Priest, fled to their ancestral villages then to India and therefore escaped death.

A significant portion of the temple land has been lost due to the Vested Property Act and confiscation by the Bangladesh Government, and the current premises are considerably lower than the historic reach of the property.

== Religious and socio-cultural activities ==
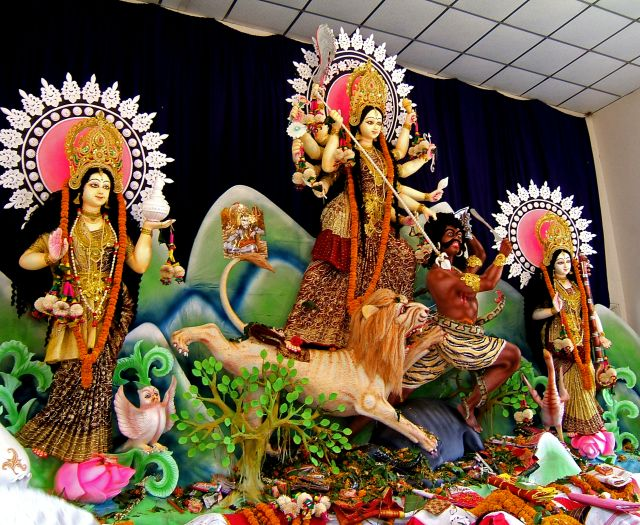
Durga puja celebrations in Dhakeshwari Temple

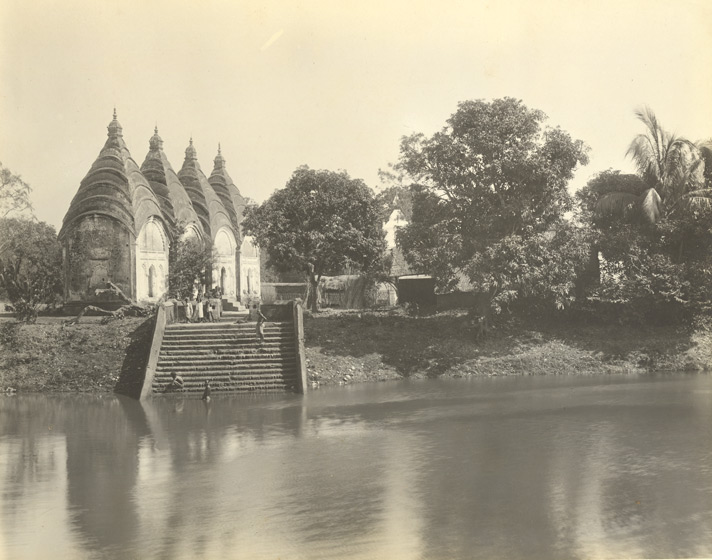
Dhakeshwari Temple (1904), Photograph taken by Fritz Kapp.

Dhakeshwari Temple is a hub of socio-cultural as well as religious activity. Each year, the largest celebration of Durga Puja (the most important event in the Bengali Hindu calendar) in Dhaka is held at the National Temple, and a stream of dignitaries (such as the Bangladeshi President, Prime Minister, Leader of Opposition, Members of Parliament and media celebrities) come to congratulate the Bangladeshi Hindu community from the temple premises. A Bijaya Sammelani (cultural program following Durga Puja) takes place in the adjoining parade ground a few days after Durga Puja is complete, and is also a major cultural event in the Dhaka calendar, regularly attracting some of the top performers from the Dhaka music and film industry.

One of the most important events of the year is the Janmashthami procession which starts from Dhakeshwari temple and then proceeds through the streets of Old Dhaka; this occurs on the day of Krishna's birthday, which is also a public holiday in Bangladesh and second only to Durga Puja in importance in the Bengali calendar. The procession dates back to 1902 but was stopped in 1948 following the establishment of Pakistan and. The procession was resumed in 1989.

Concerts and charity drives (such as flood relief) are also a regular fixture within the temple throughout the year. Each year, Dhakeshwari Temple hosts major blood drives and inoculation programs which are open to all residents of Dhaka city.

In present days, each year, the largest celebration of Durga puja (the most important event in the Bengali Hindu calendar) in Dhaka is held at the National Temple, and a stream of dignitaries come to felicitate the Bangladeshi Hindu community from the temple premises. Several thousand worshippers and onlookers stream through the premises where they are offered prasad (food – usually rice and lentils). A Bijaya Sammilan (a cultural program following Durga Puja) takes place in the adjoining parade ground a few days after Durga Puja is complete, and is also a major cultural event in the Dhaka calendar. Durga Puja comes to an end after five days, through the celebration of Bijoya Dashami after performing the sacred rituals of Sashthi, Saptami, Ashtami and Navami. Bijoya Dashami will end with the idols of Durga and her four children Lakshmi, Saraswati, Kartik and Ganesha taken in processions for immersion in river or sea. A processions starts from the temple.

Prime Minister of India, Narendra Modi, prayed at the temple during his official visit to Bangladesh on 7 June 2015. He was given a model of the goddess Dhakeshwari by the temple authorities.

== Present condition ==
The temple was severely damaged during the 1971 Bangladesh Liberation War, and over half of the temple's buildings were destroyed. The main worship hall was taken over by the Pakistan Army and used as an ammunitions storage area.

In 2018, Prime Minister Sheikh Hasina visited the Dhakeshwari Temple and announced gifting of adjacent land to the temple authorities. Previously, the temple lost a lot of its property to land grabbing.

== Gallery ==
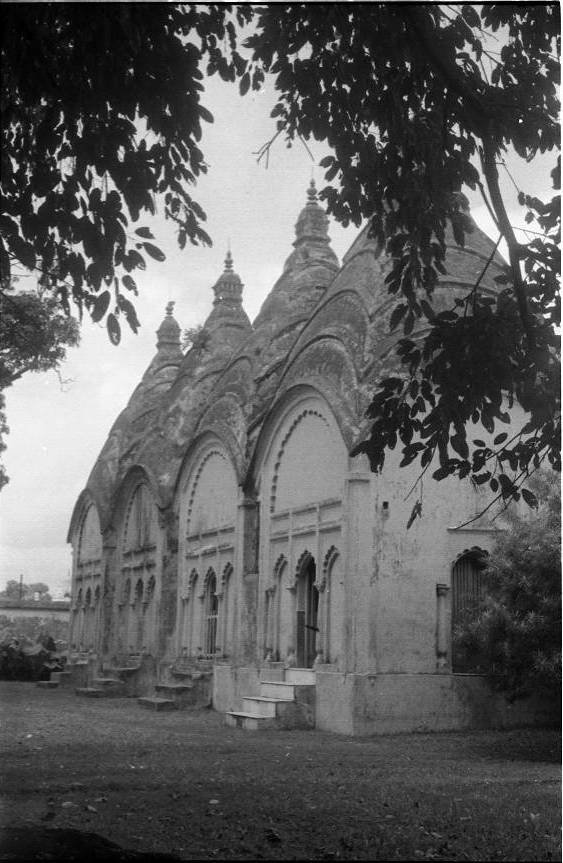
The Siva temples in 1967

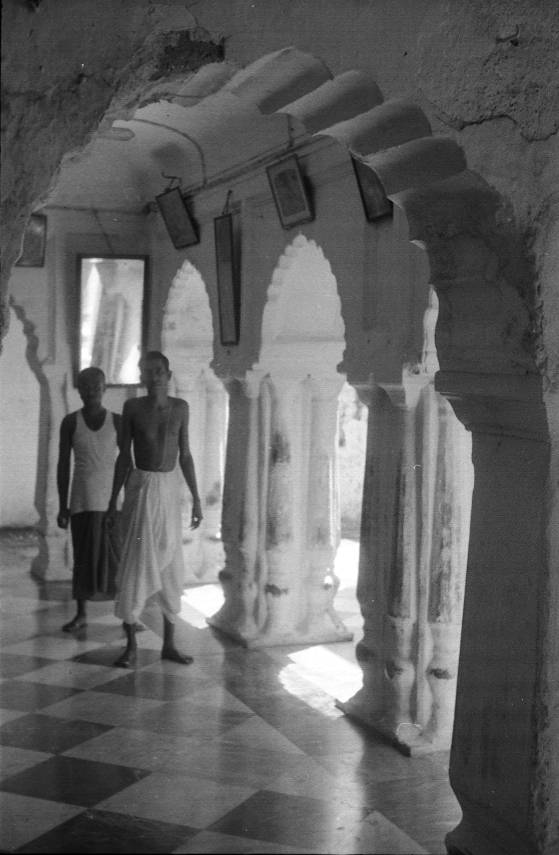
Inside the temple (1967)

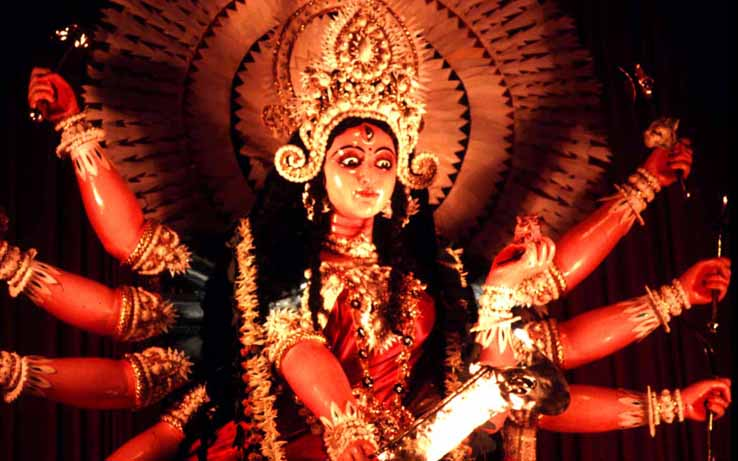
Effigy of the goddess Durga

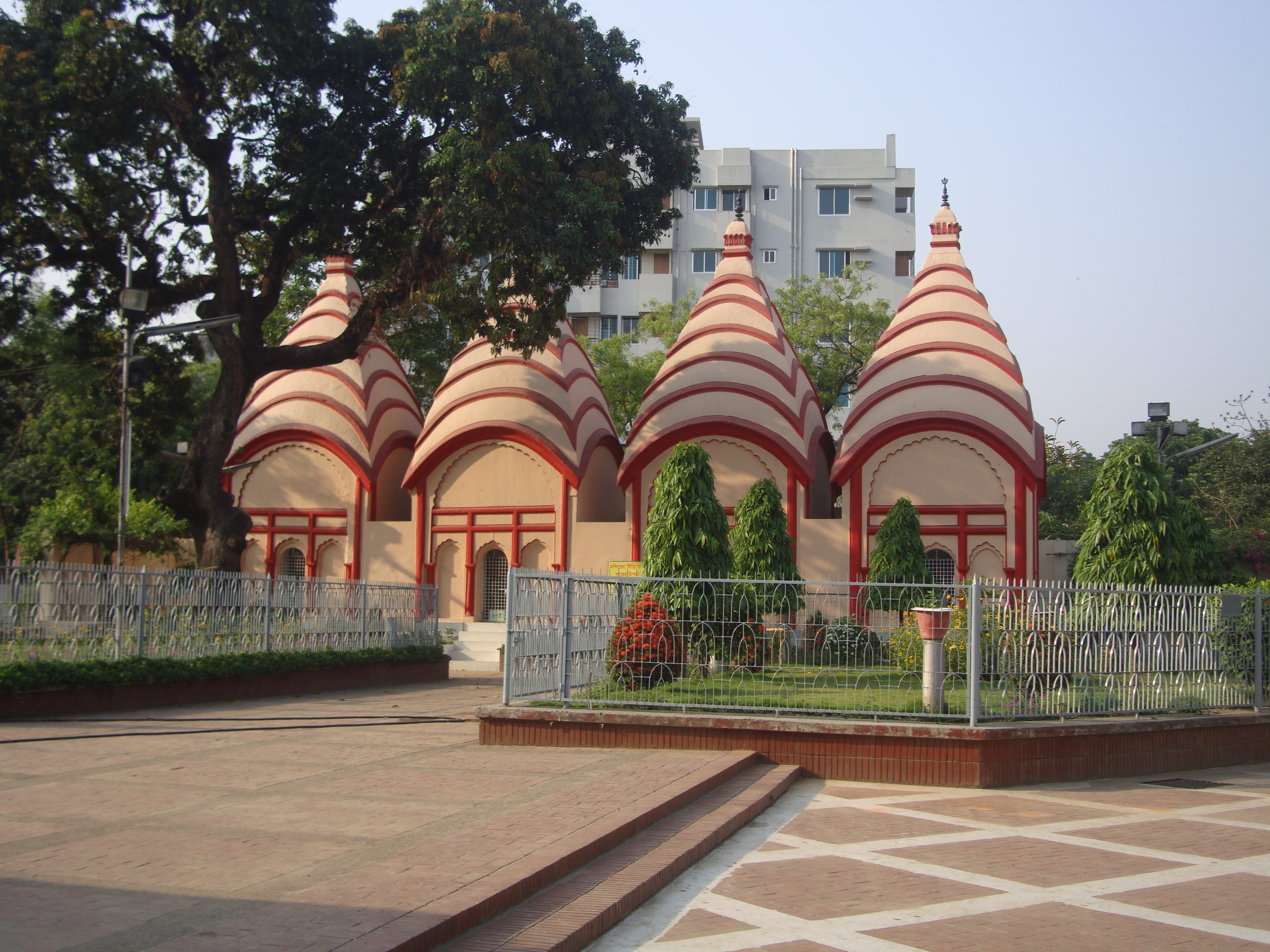
Siva Temples

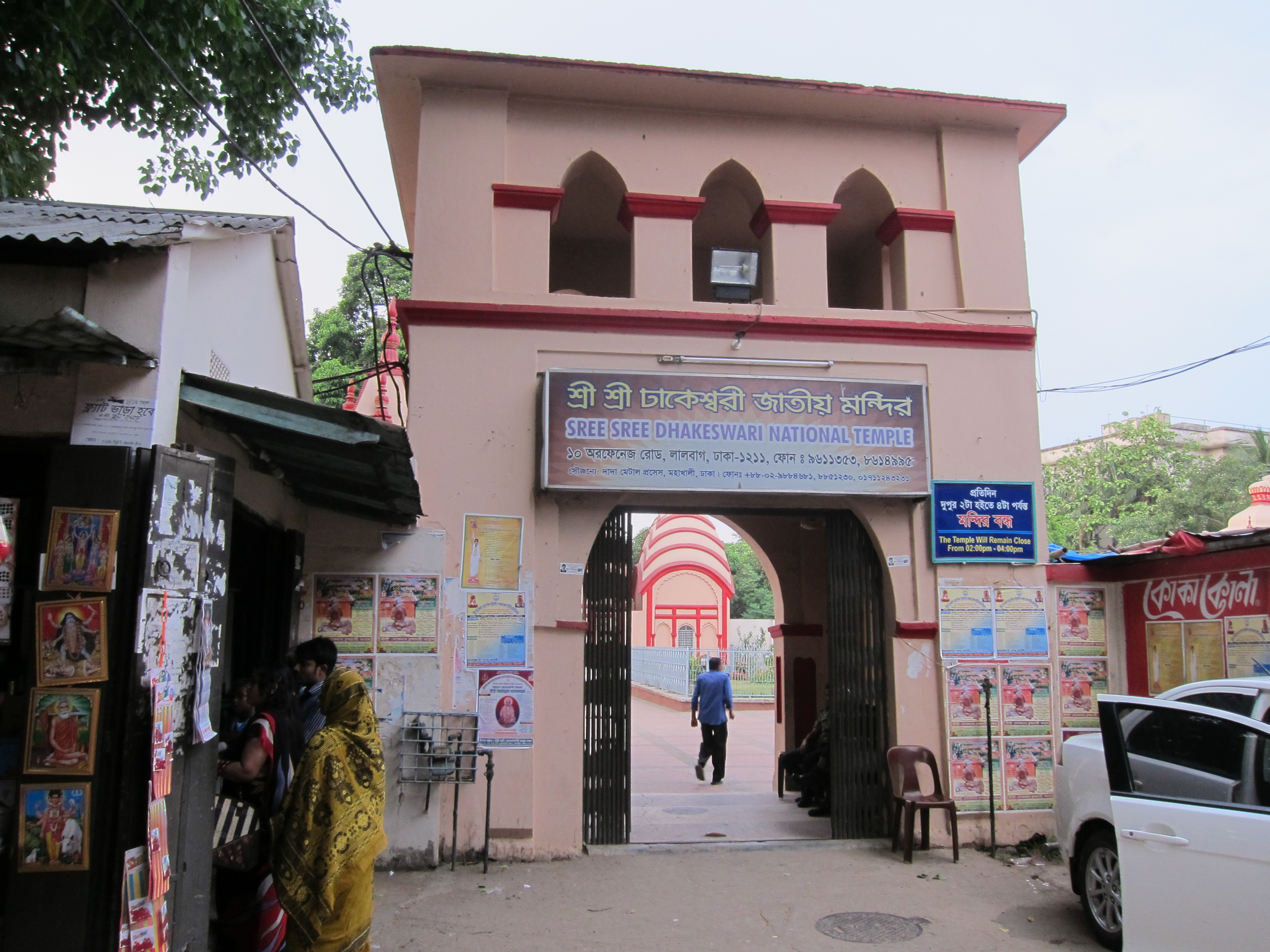
Main Entrance
Dhakeshwari National Temple complex, 360-degree view in May 2015

== See also ==
- Dhakeshwari Mata Temple, Kumortuli
- Hinduism in Bangladesh
- Architecture of Bangladesh
- Bagha Mosque
- Khan Mohammad Mridha Mosque
- Saat Masjid
- Shahbaz Khan Mosque
- Shona Mosque
- Sixty Dome Mosque
