= Kumortuli =

Kumartuli
- Neighbourhood in Kolkata (Calcutta)
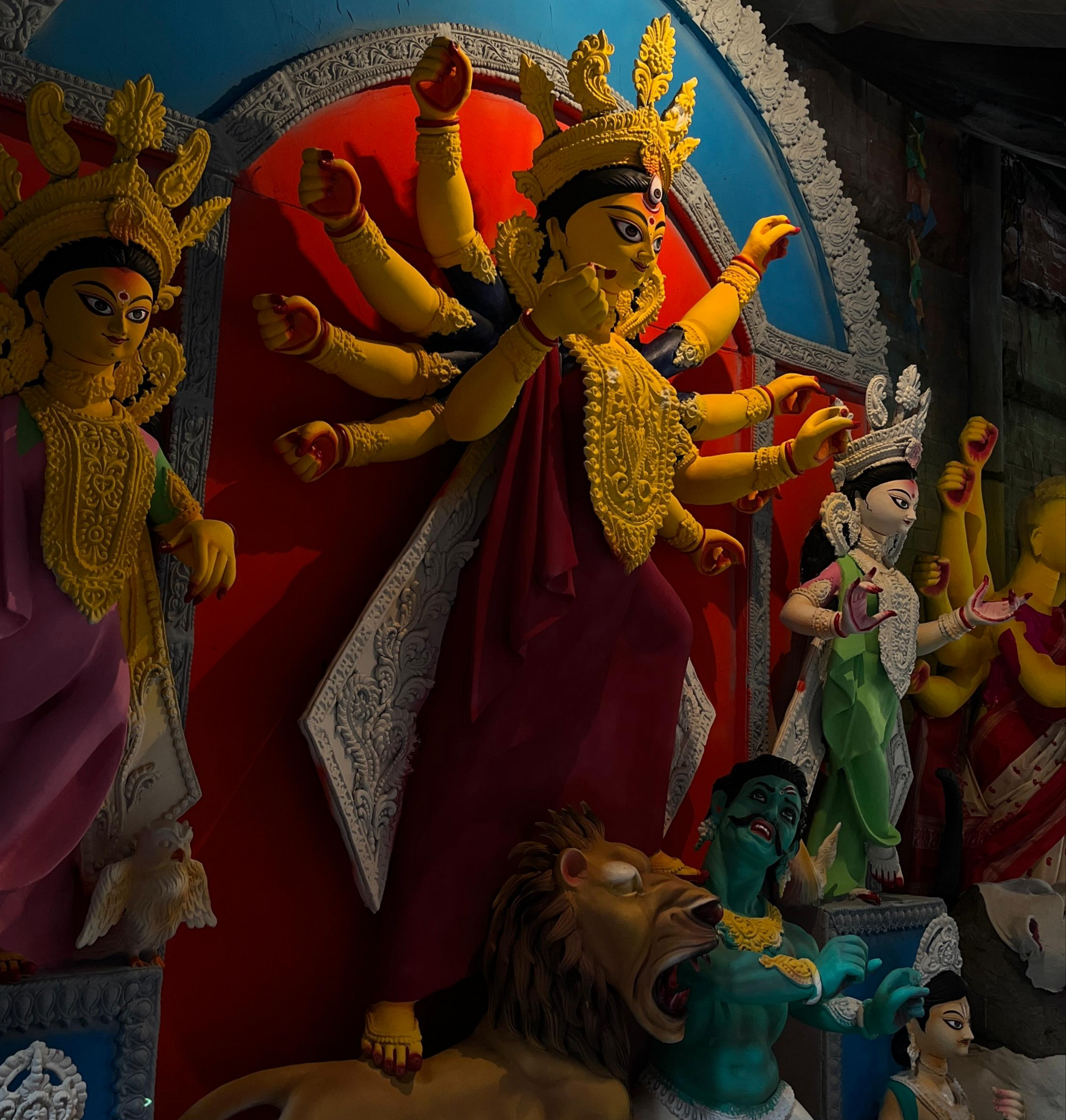
- Idol of Maa Durga at Kumortuli

- Location in Kolkata
- Coordinates: 22.6000°N 88.3614°E
- Country: India
- State: West Bengal
- City: Kolkata
- District: Kolkata
- Metro Station: Sovabazar Sutanuti
- Municipal Corporation: Kolkata Municipal Corporation
- KMC ward: 9
- Elevation: 36 ft (11 m)
- Time zone: UTC+5:30 (IST)
- PIN: 700005
- Area code: +91 33
- Lok Sabha constituency: Kolkata Uttar
- Vidhan Sabha constituency: Shyampukur

Kumortuli (also spelt as Kumartuli) is a traditional potters' quarter in North Kolkata in West Bengal, India. The city is renowned for its sculpting prowess. It not only manufactures clay idols for various festivals but also regularly exports them.

== History ==
The British colonisation of Bengal and India started following the victory of the British East India Company in the Battle of Plassey in 1757. The company decided to build new settlement Fort William at the site of the Gobindapur village. Most of the existing population shifted to Sutanuti. While such neighbourhoods as Jorasanko and Pathuriaghata became the centres of the local rich; there were other areas that were developed simultaneously. The villages of Gobindapur, Sutanuti and Kalikata developed to give rise to the latter day metropolis of Calcutta.

Holwell, under orders from the directors of the British East India Company, allotted "separate districts to the Company’s workmen". These neighbourhoods in the heart of the Indian quarters acquired the work-related names – Suriparah (the place of wine sellers), Collotollah (the place of oil men), Chuttarparah (the place of carpenters), Aheeritollah (cowherd's quarters), Coomartolly (potters' quarters) and so on.

Most of the artisans living in the North Kolkata neighbourhoods dwindled in numbers or even vanished, as they were pushed out of the area in the late nineteenth century by the invasion from Burrabazar. In addition, Marwari businessmen virtually flushed out others from many North Kolkata localities. The potters of Kumortuli, who fashioned the clay from the river beside their home into pots to be sold at Sutanuti Bazar (later Burrabazar), managed to survive in the area. Gradually they took to making the images of gods and goddesses, worshipped in large numbers in the mansions all around and later at community pujas in the city and beyond.

In 1888, one of the 25 newly organized police section houses was located in Kumartuli.

== Geography ==
Kumortuli is located in Ward No. 8 of Kolkata Municipal Corporation, mostly between Rabindra Sarani (formerly Chitpur Road) and the Hooghly River. It is between Beniatola (Ahiritola) and Shobhabazar. In maps showing thanas or police stations in old Kolkata, Kumortuli is shown as being between Shyampukur, Bartala, Jorasanko, Jorabagan and Hooghly River.

== Culture ==
=== Dhakeswari Mata Temple ===
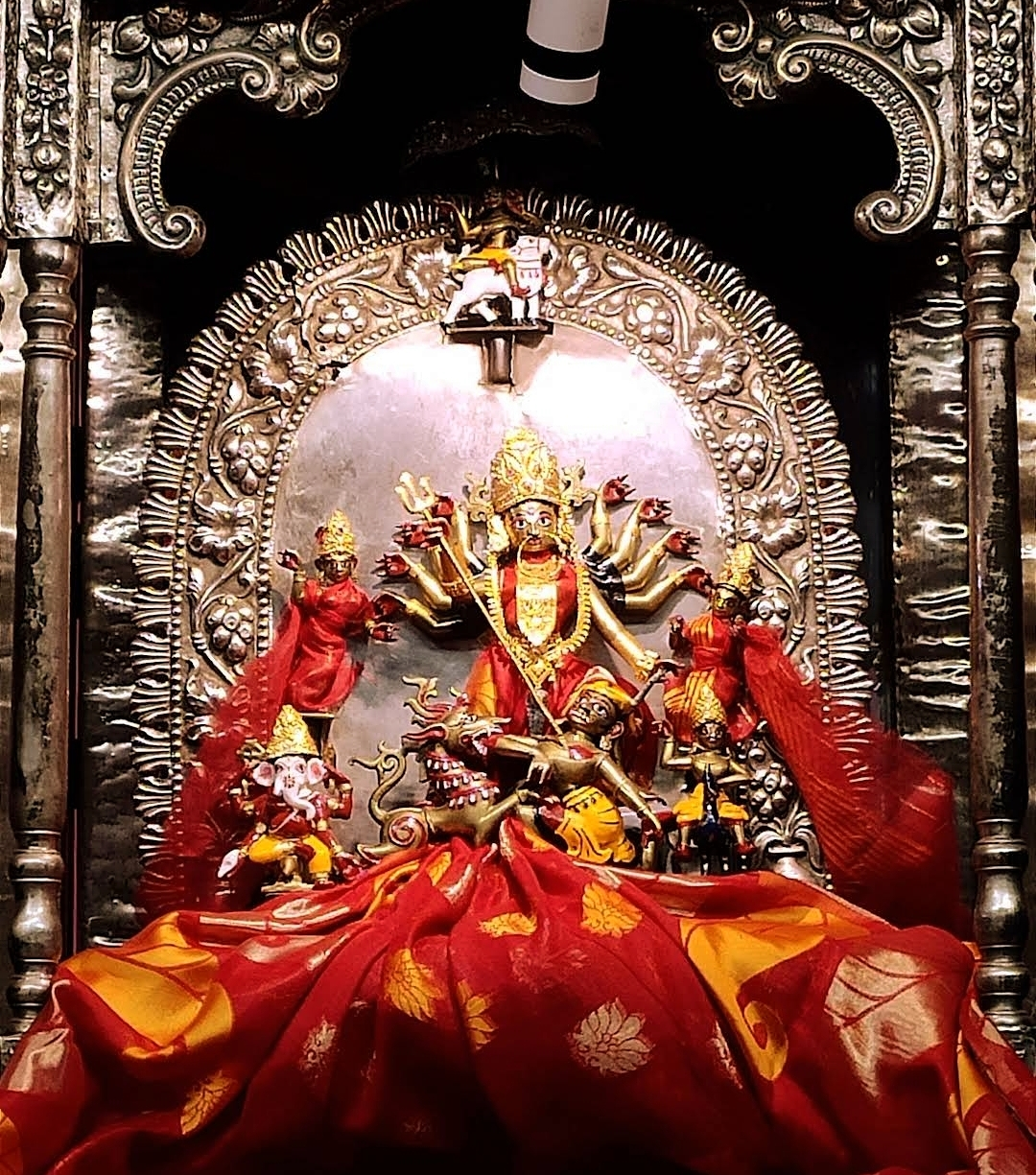
Dhakeswari Mata Idol at Kumortuli

Dhakeswari Mata Temple is a Hindu temple located in Kumortuli, near Sovabazar, Kolkata. It is situated on the eastern bank of the Hooghly River near Kumartolly. The presiding deity of the temple is Devi Durga, which was taken to Kolkata in 1947 from Dhakeswari Temple in Dhaka, Bangladesh.

The idol is 1.5 feet tall and has ten arms, which are mounted on a mythical lion in the form of Katyani Mahishasurmardini Durga. On her two sides are Laxmi, Saraswati, Kartik and Ganesh. The origins of the main temple remain mysterious, hence many rumors preside. One rumor suggests that the wife of King Bijoy Sen once went to the village of Langolbond to bathe. On her way back she gave birth to a son, Ballal Sen. Later this prince became king of the Sena dynasty. After ascending to the throne, Ballal Sen built a temple to glorify his birthplace, which is known as Dhakeswari temple, Bangladesh.

Ballal Sen proceeded to have vivid dreams, one of which involved the deity Durga. He dreamt that Durga was hidden within the jungle; he proceeded to discover the said deity which was concealed there. In order to celebrate this discovery, he built a temple later named Dhakeswari. This explains the etymological meaning of "Dhakeswari", which means "covered or hidden deity". According to Bengali Hindus Dhakeswari is considered to be the presiding deity of Dhaka, which is an incarnation or form of Goddess Durga, the Adi Shakti. The idol of Durga is called Dhakeswari.

Location in Kolkata

In 1947, during the Partition of India, caretakers of the temple evacuated the idol from Dhaka to Calcutta, and it has remained there since.

After this, a Tiwari family from Azamgarh was appointed by the royal family to undertake daily worship of the deity. In 1946, the descendants of that family, Prallad Kishore Tiwari (or Rajendra Kishore Tiwari) transported the idol in a highly confidential aircraft to Kolkata and was re-appointed, where they still serve the goddess continuously. After taken to Kolkata, the idol spent the next two or three years being worshipped in the Debendranath Chowdhury home.

In 1950 the businessman Debendranath Chowdhary built the temple of the goddess in the Kumortuli area and established some of the goddess' property for her daily services.

The Dhakeshwari devi worship is different from the traditional Durga puja of Bengal. According to the current priest of the temple, Shaktiprasad Ghosal, during Durga Puja, the goddess is worshipped in accordance with the Navratri or nine night rituals of Northern India.

== Notable residents ==
Being close to the heart of Kolkata, Kumortuli was home to a number of renowned or famous people during the Bengal Renaissance.

There is a road in Kumortuli named after Nandram Sen, a wealthy former resident. His wealth was accrued because of his status as the first tax collector of Kolkata, during the 1700s. Gobindram Mitter, the tax collector after Nandram, lived in a large mansion on a sprawling 16-acre property during this time. His house is now known as one of the "Great Houses of Old Calcutta".

Banamali Sarkar's famous house which is immortalized in Bengali rhyming proverb, was there till the 19th century. He has a winding lane named after him in Kumortuli.

== Transport ==
Rabindra Sarani passes through Kumortuli.

=== Bus ===
- 43 Esplanade - Dakshineswar

=== Train ===
Sovabazar Ahiritola railway station and Bagbazar railway station on Kolkata Circular Railway line are the nearest stations. Kolkata Station, which is one of the five major railway-terminals of Kolkata Metropolitan Area, is also located nearby.

=== Metro ===
Nearest metro station is Sovabazar Sutanuti metro station and through metro, it can be easily accessed the areas of Dakshineswar and New Garia (Kavi Subhash metro station).

== Gallery ==
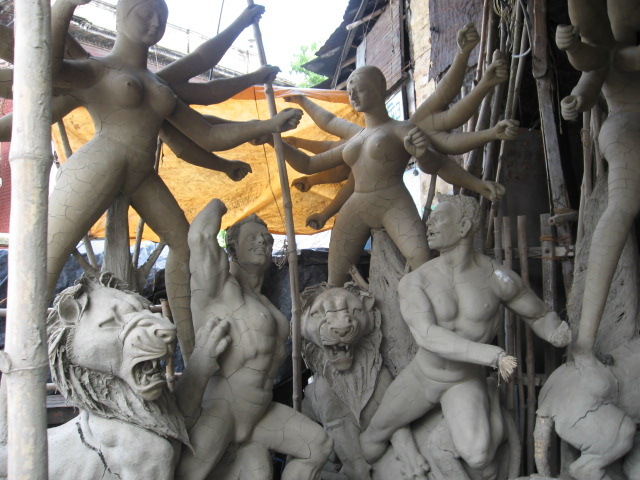
Durga clay idols under preparation

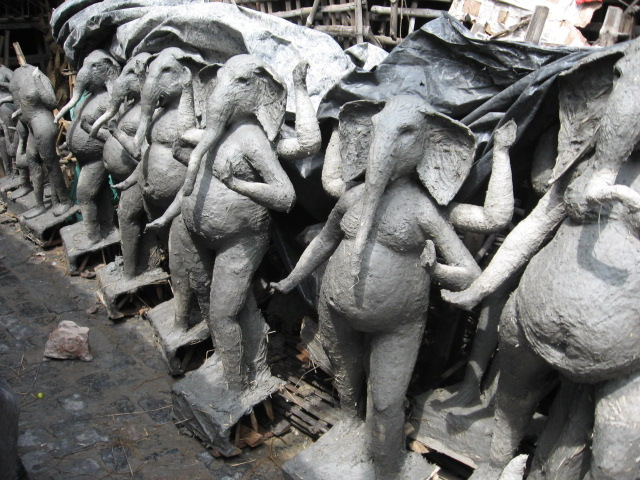
Ganesha clay idols under preparation

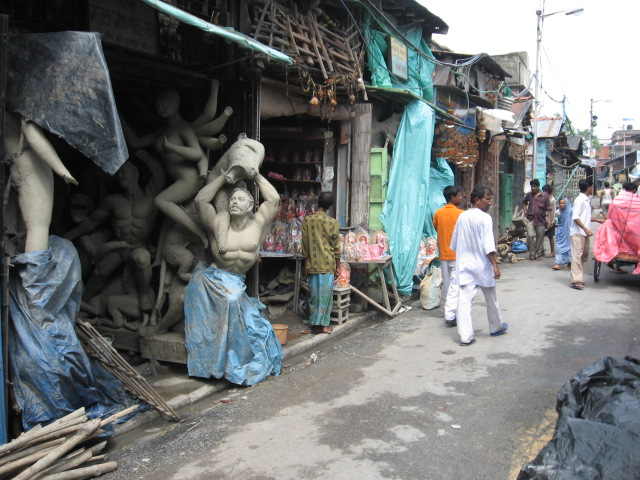
A general view of Banamali Sarkar Street

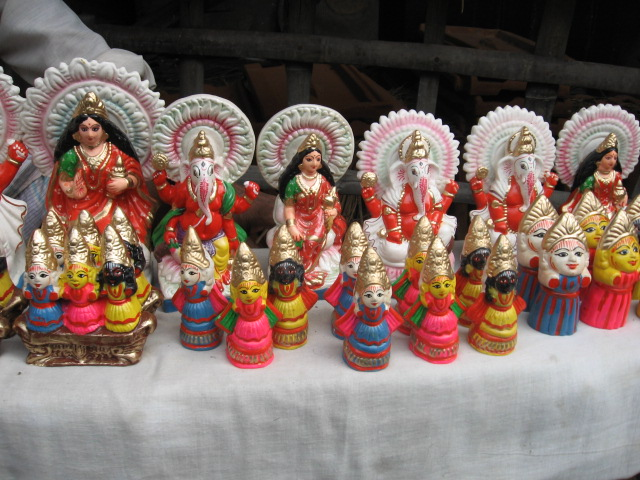
Some finished mini idols of Devi lakshmi, Ganesha, Jagannath, Balarama and Subhadra are on sale at Kumortuli

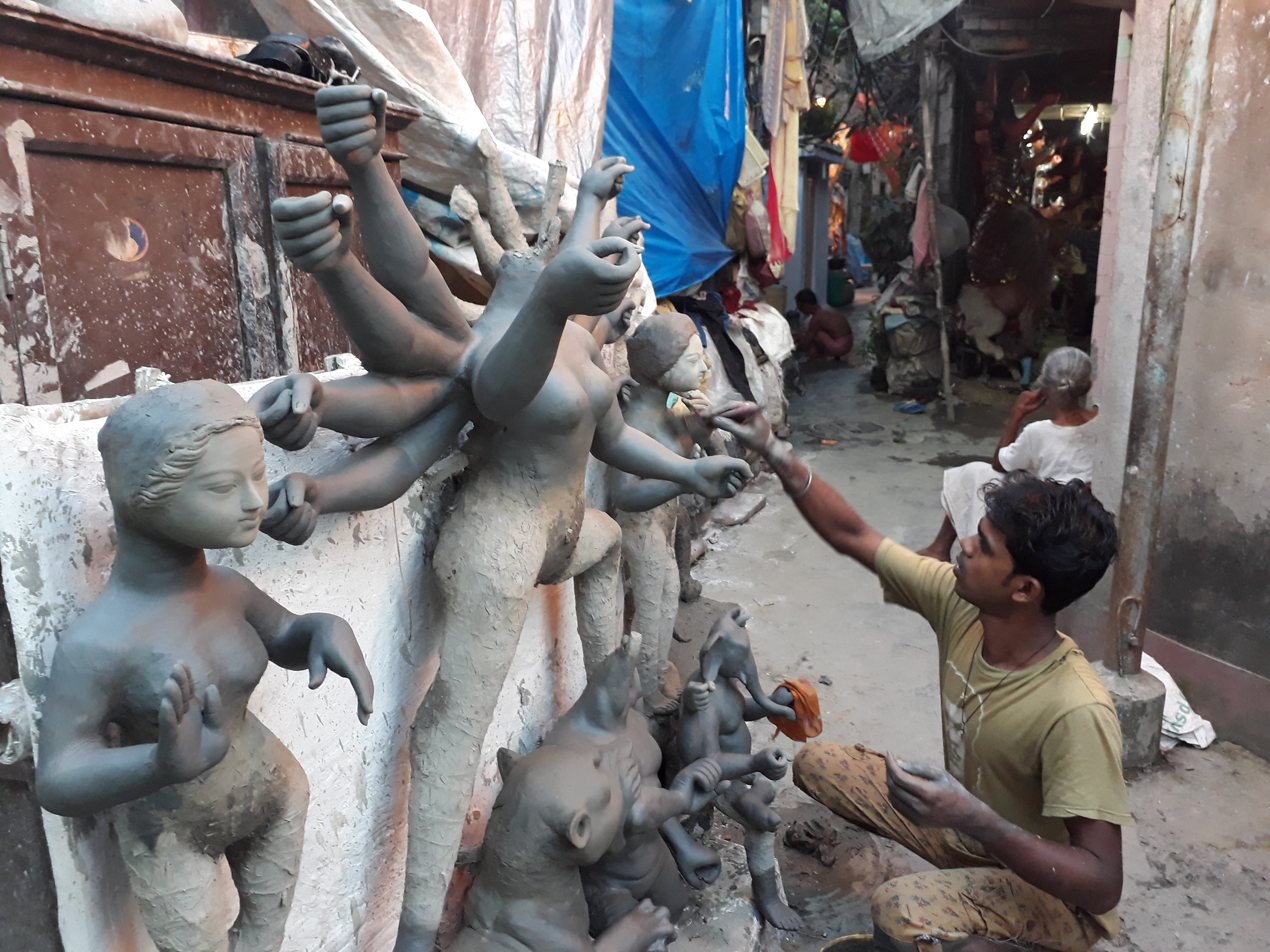
Idol making of Devi Durga at Kumortuli

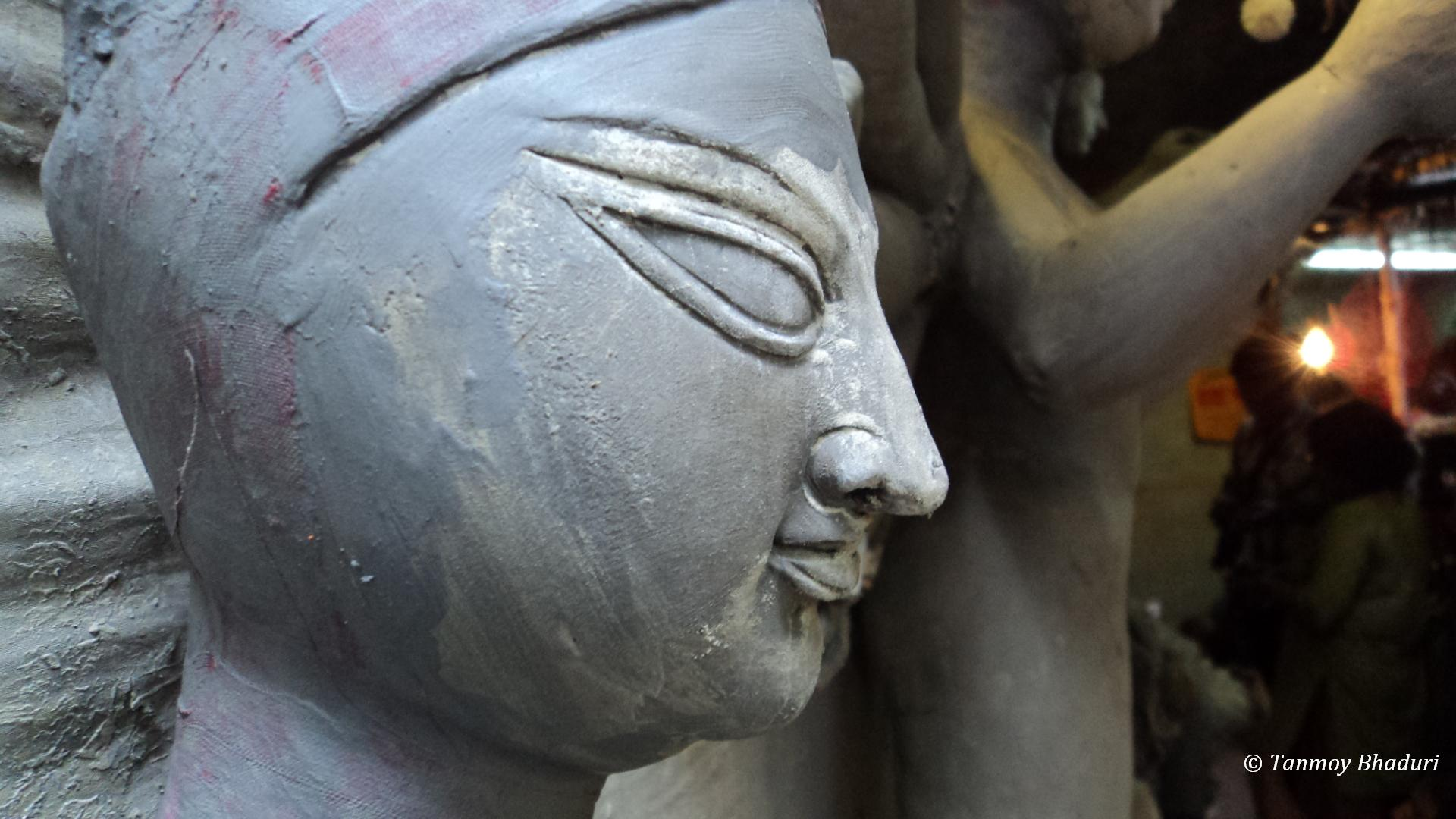
Face of Devi Durga ready for painting

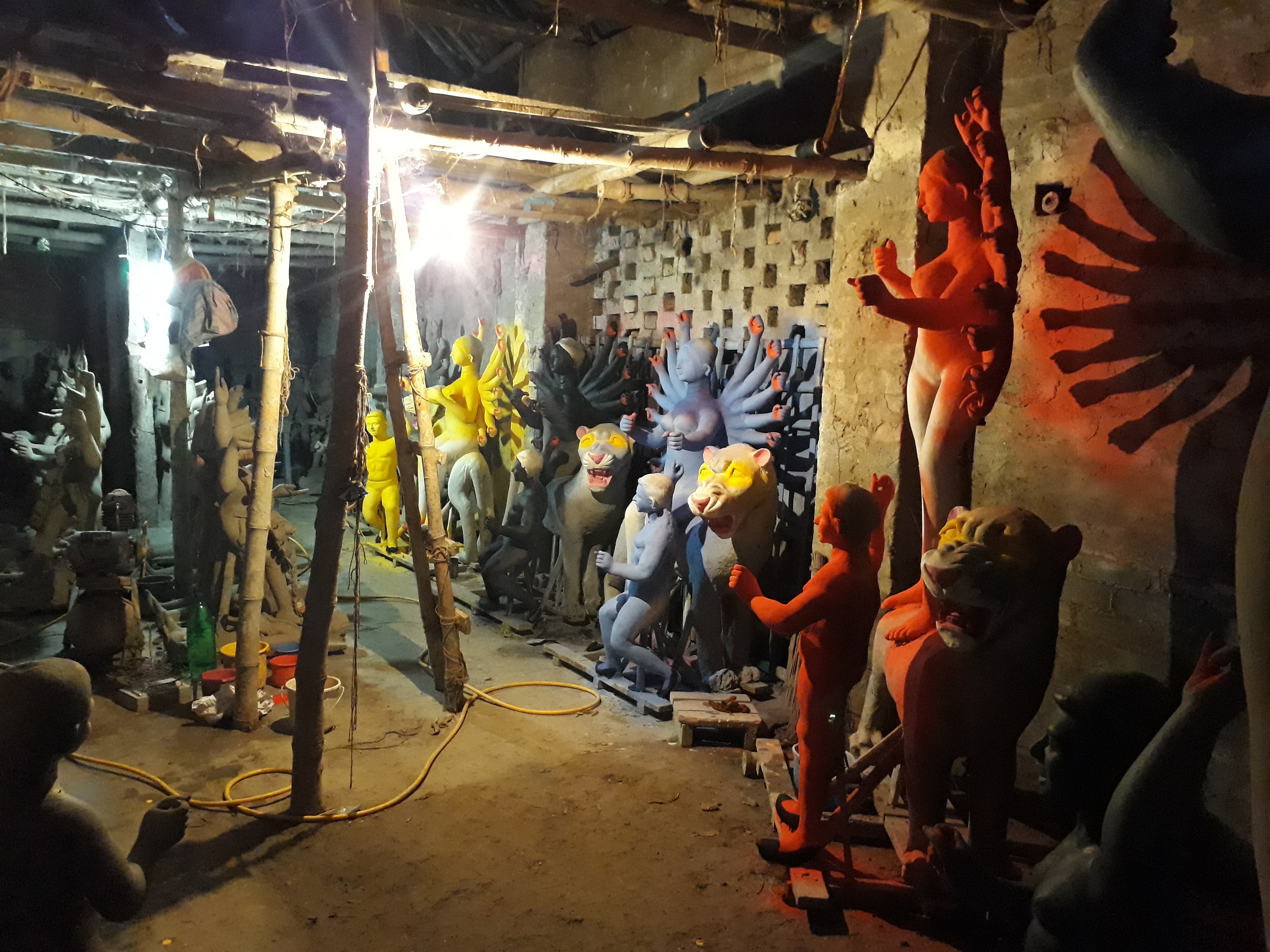
The workshop at Kumortuli before Puja

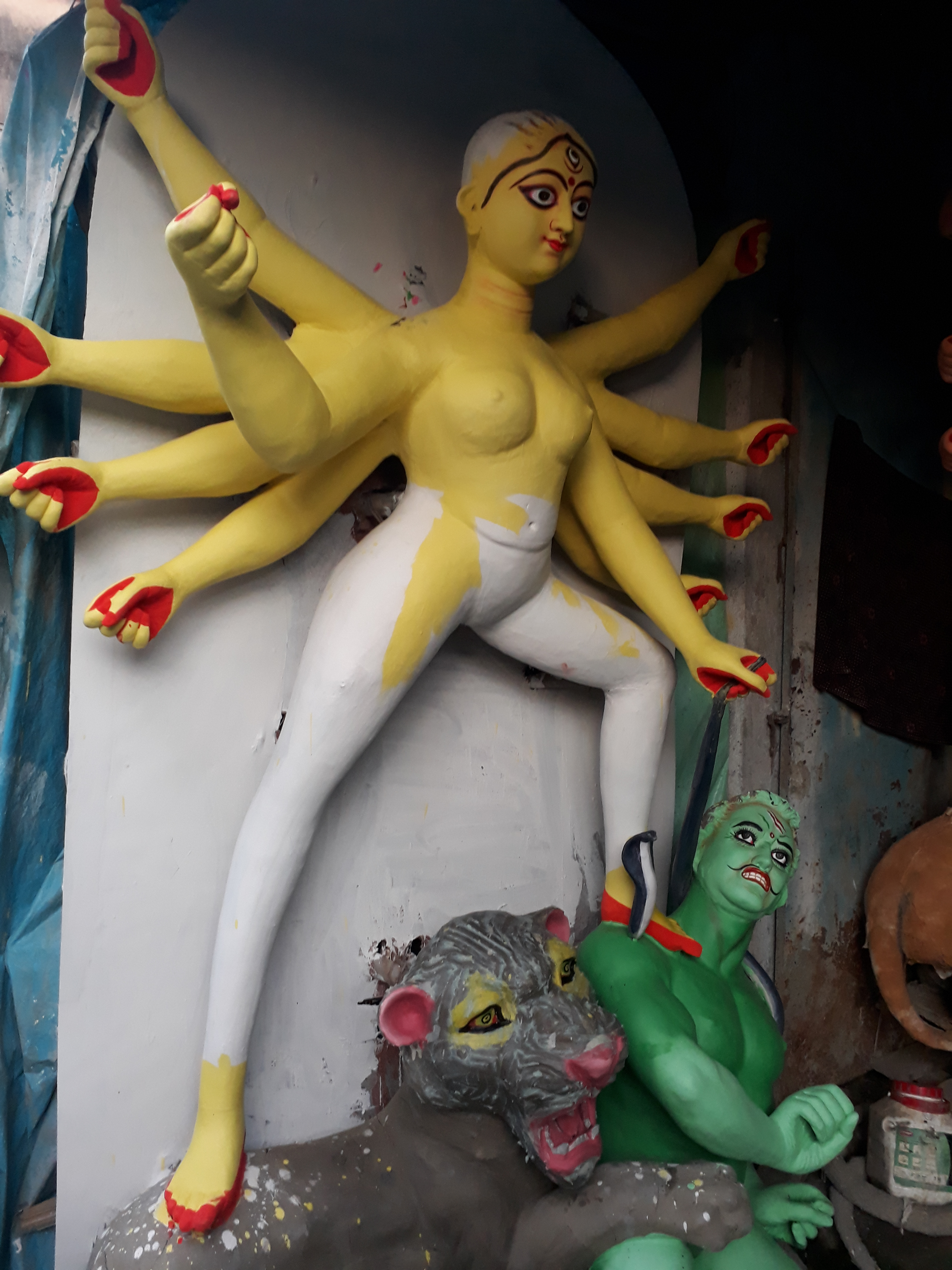
Idol of Devi Durga under preparation

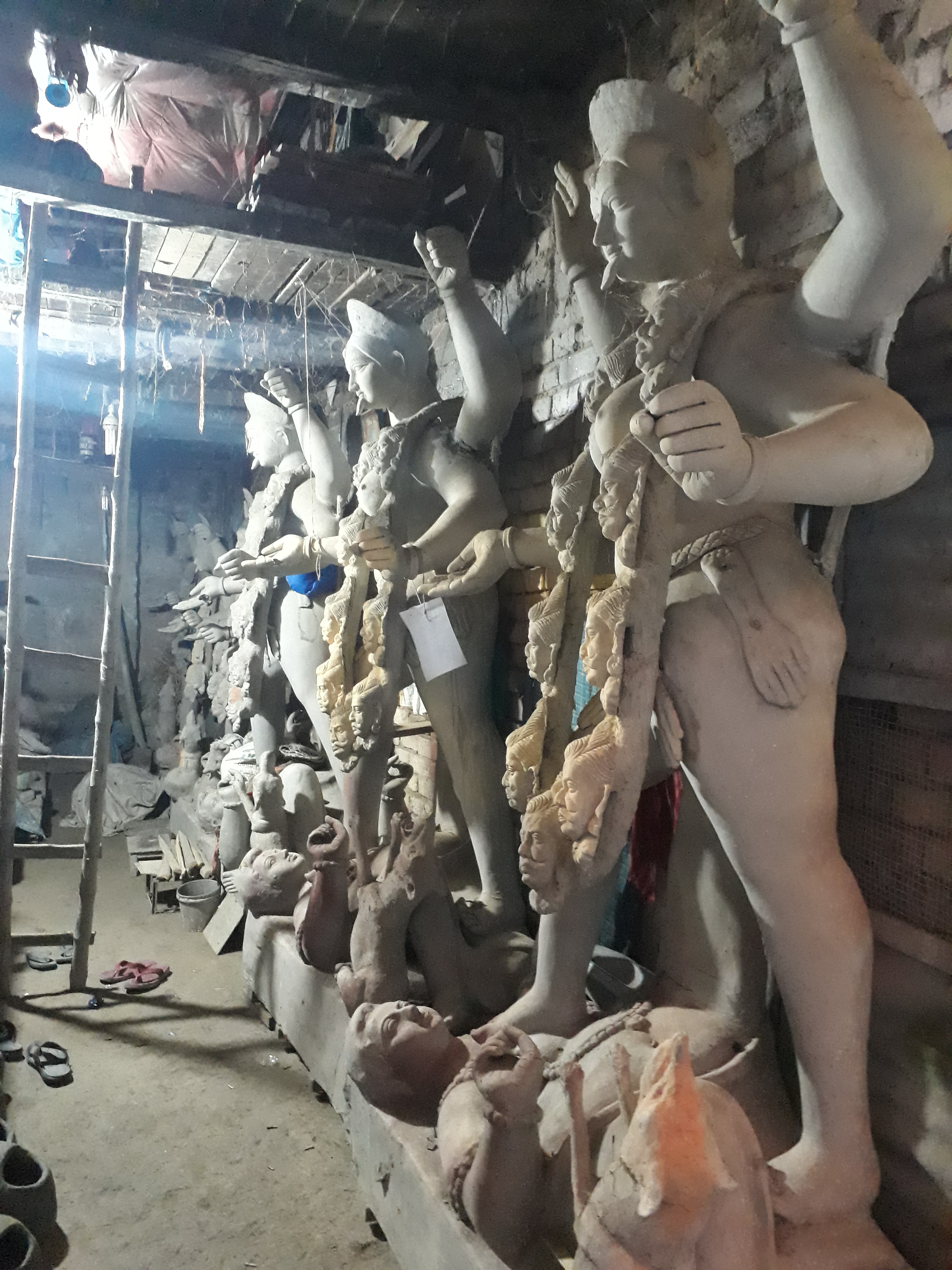
Idols of Devi Kali under preparation

Half finished Goddess Kali idol

== See also ==
- North Kolkata
- Shobhabazar
- Shobhabazar Rajbari
