= Gobindram Mitter =

Indian official (d. 1776)

- Born: Unknown; Chanak, 24 Parganas, Company Raj (present-day North 24 Parganas district, West Bengal, India)
- Died: 1776; Calcutta, Bengal Presidency, Company Raj (present-day Kolkata, West Bengal, India)
- Occupation: Tax collector

Gobindram Mitter (also spelt Govindram Mitra, Gobindaram Mitra, Gobinda Ram Mitra, Gobindro Ram Mitro) was an Indian official during the Company rule in India, who earned reputation for his wealth and extravagance.

== Early life ==
He was born in Chanak village near Barrackpur, now in North 24 Parganas district. When the English bought the three villages of Kalikata, Sutanuti and Gobindapur from the Sabarna Roy Choudhury family in 1698 and established their zemindary (estate) or presidency in Kolkata, they appointed an Indian deputy collector to assist the English collector in the collection of rent. The first Indian deputy collector was Nandaram Sen. After his discharge, the second Indian to step into that position was Gobindram Mitra.

== Success ==
=== Extravagance ===
The Zemindar was a collector of revenue as well as a judicial officer; and it is on record that it was part of his duty to "make roads and repair drains" … The President and Council, or any three of them, the President being one, were empowered to hold a court in revenue cases, but the real power lay with the Zemindar, and, it may be added with the Indian deputy, who went by the name of "Black Zemindar". This office was filled during whole of the period from 1720 to 1756, by the famous Gobindram Metre (Mitter), of whom John Zephaniah Holwell, Zemindar of Calcutta from 1752 to 1756, wrote that by reason of the many changes in the headship of the office, "a power in perpetuity devolved on the standing deputy who was always styled the 'Black Zemindar,’ and such was the tyranny of this man and such the dread conceived of him in the minds of the natives that no one durst complain or give information". It need hardly be said that Gobindram accumulated vast wealth during the tenure of power: and he is said to have built in 1731 a magnificent "nine jewel" temple on Chitpore Road, the loftiest pinnacle of which was higher than the Ochterlony Monument… The main building was overthrown in the terrible cyclone and earthquake of 1737.

— H.E.A.Cotton

Mitter earned large amounts of money. He was considered too powerful for his boss Holwell to remove him.

He is credited by some as being the first Bengali to drive a coach. His celebration of the Hindu festivals was marked with lavishness and extravagance. The entire image of goddess Durga was wrapped in gold and silver leaf. Thirty to fifty maunds (one maund is about 37 kg) of rice was offered to the deity, a thousand Brahmins were fed and given gifts. It was he who fired the urge for conspicuous consumption in the society of his time. Mitter had a sprawling house at Kumortuli spread on 50 bighas (around 16 acres) of land. He also had a famous villa, Nandan Bagan, in rural Bengal.

=== Legend ===
Mitter became a legend in his lifetime. He was famous as native deputy and the words "Gobindramer chhari" (Gobndram's stick) was celebrated in a Bengali rhyming proverb:

Banamali Sarkarer bari
Gobindra Mitrer chhari
Umichander dari
Huzoorimaler kori
Ke na jane?

Banamali Sarkar’s house
Gobindram Mitter’s stick
Umichand’s beard
Huzoorimal’s money
Who does not know of these?

Banamali Sarkar's grand house was built in Kumortuli during the period 1740 to 1750.

== Temple ==
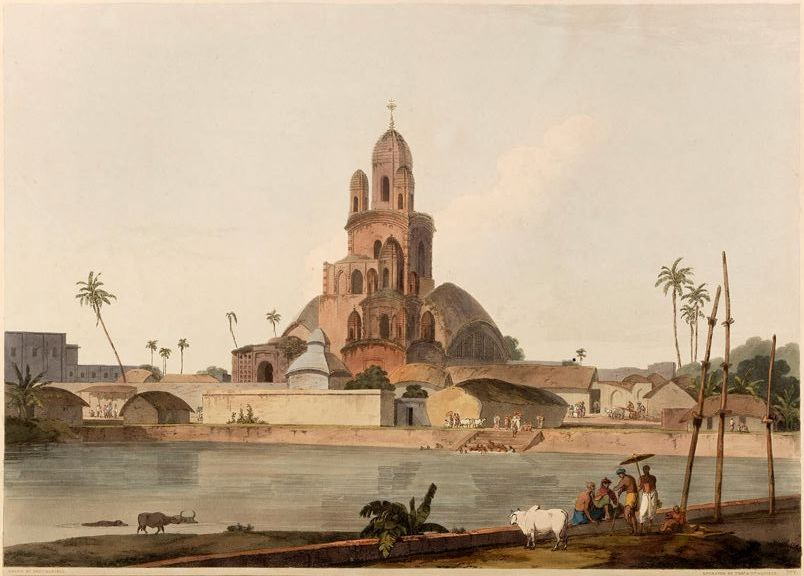
This Pagoda was dedicated to Seeva and was built by Gobindram Mitter in 1725

Mitter built a nine-turreted or nabaratna temple of goddess Kali on the banks of the Ganges at Kumortuli in 1725 (some say, it was in 1731). Its 165-feet spire was a navigational aid for sailors. They called it the 'pagoda'. The ruins of the temple can be seen near the Siddheswari Kalimandir in Bagbazar.

== Descendants ==
His son, Roghoo (Raghu) Mitter had a Ganges bathing ghat (stairs) named after him (it was possibly built by him). It later became popular as Baghbazar ghat. Roghoo Mitter's grandson Abhay Charan Mitter was the dewan of the collector of 24 Parganas and is reputed to have given a lakh of rupees to his guru or spiritual preceptor and then came his grandson Dhanada Charan Mitter . A street in Kumartuli is named after Abhay Charan Mitra. Jorabagan, a Kolkata neighbourhood was so named because the road through it led to the garden houses of Gobindram Mitter and Umichand.

== See also ==
- Legendary personalities in Bengal
