= Jorabagan =

- Neighbourhood in Kolkata (Calcutta)
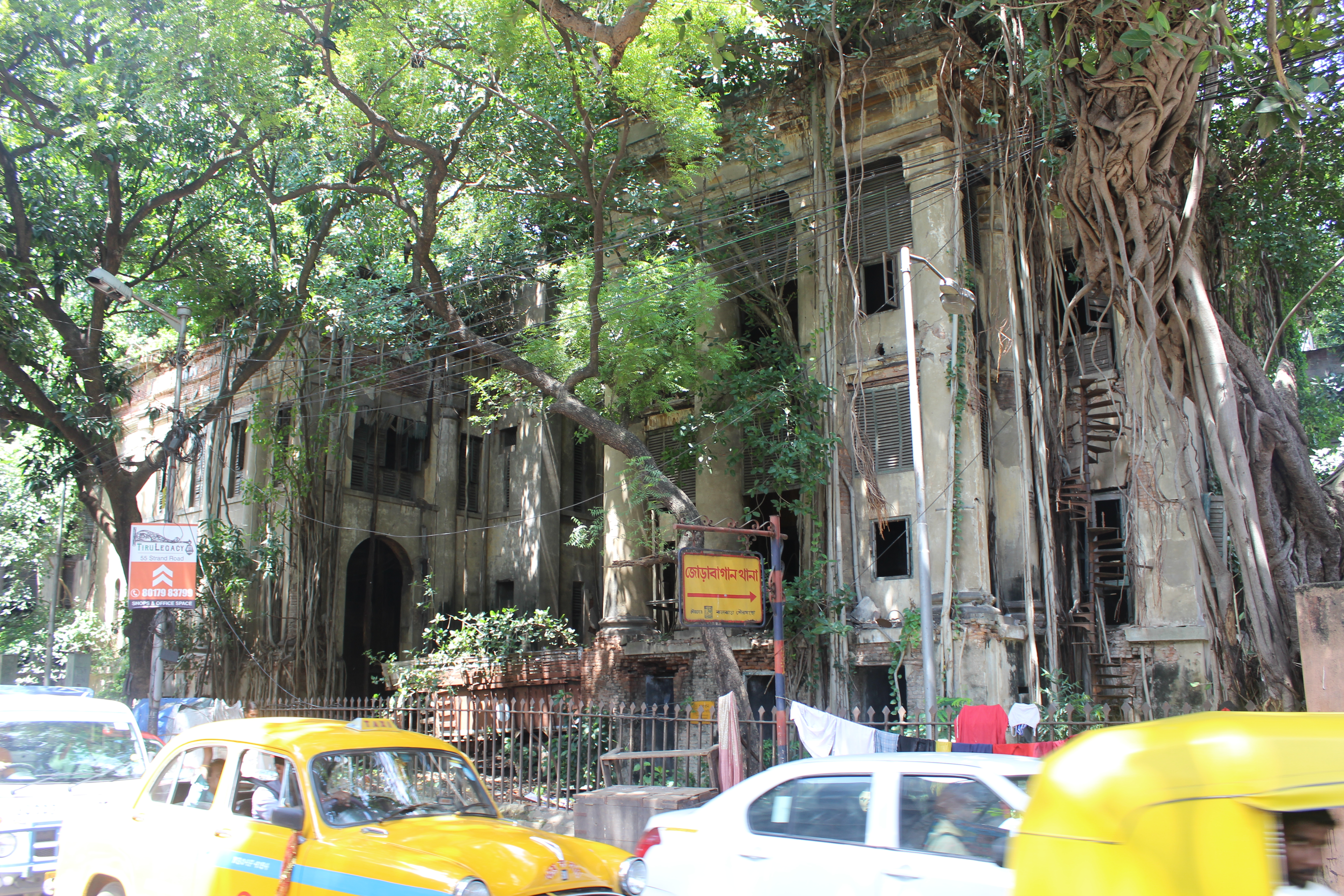
- Jorabagan Police Station (formerly Duff College)

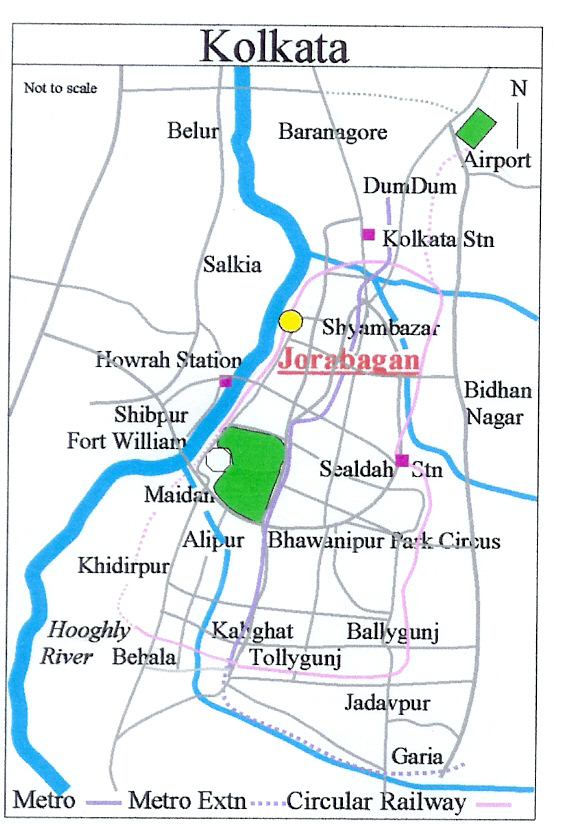
- Country: India
- State: West Bengal
- City: Kolkata
- District: Kolkata
- Metro Station: Girish Park and Shobhabazar Sutanuti
- Municipal Corporation: Kolkata Municipal Corporation
- KMC wards: 21, 24
- Elevation: 36 ft (11 m)

Population
  - Total: For population see linked KMC ward page
- Time zone: UTC+5:30 (IST)
- PIN: 700006
- Area code: +91 33
- Lok Sabha constituency: Kolkata Uttar
- Vidhan Sabha constituency: Shyampukur and Jorasanko

Jorabagan is a neighbourhood of North Kolkata, in Kolkata district, in the Indian state of West Bengal. As a neighbourhood, it covers a small area but its importance is primarily because of the police station.

== Etymology ==
Jorabagan, meaning ‘a pair of gardens’ in Bengali, was so named because the road through it led to the garden houses of Gobindram Mitter and Umichand.

== History ==
Jorabagan is part of old Sutanuti. It is in this neighbourhood that Job Charnock made his famous landing at Sutanuti ghat in 1690. Mohunton's ghat between Beniatola and Shobhabazar ghats lurks the forgotten traditional landing place. There was a large tree under which Job Charnock is believed to have rested.

The Sabarna Roy Choudhury Paribar Parishad, and nine other intellectuals of the city filed a public interest litigation before the Kolkata High Court in 2001 demanding a probe into the matter whether Job Charnock can be regarded as the founder of Kolkata. The Court, upon an Expert Committee finding, declared that Job Charnock cannot be regarded as the founder of the city.

In 1888, one of the 25 newly organized police section houses was located in Jorabagan.

== Geography ==
Nimtala ghat in the neighbourhood is the burning ghat where Hindus cremate their dead. Amongst the more renowned people cremated there was Rabindranath Tagore and the place is marked with a memorial structure. Nimtala ghat now has an electric crematorium.

=== Police district ===
Jorabagan police station is part of the North and North Suburban division of Kolkata Police. It is located at 78, Nimtala Ghat Street, Kolkata-700006.

Amherst Street Women police station covers all police districts under the jurisdiction of the North and the North Suburban division i.e. Amherst Street, Jorabagan, Shyampukur, Cossipore, Chitpur, Sinthi, Burtolla and Tala.

== Transport ==
=== Road ===
Jorabagan is surrounded by Strand Road on the west, Kali Krishna Tagore Street on the south, Rabindra Sarani on the east and Nimtala Ghat Street on the north. Baishab Seth Street-PK Tagore Street-Jadulal Mullick Road passes through the middle of the locality from north to south. Many buses and auto-rickshaws ply along these roads.

=== Train ===
Burra Bazar railway station and Shobhabazar Ahiritola railway station of the Kolkata Circular Railway are the nearest railway station.
