= Langalbandh =

Hindu pilgrimage site in Bangladesh

Langalband Bath Festival
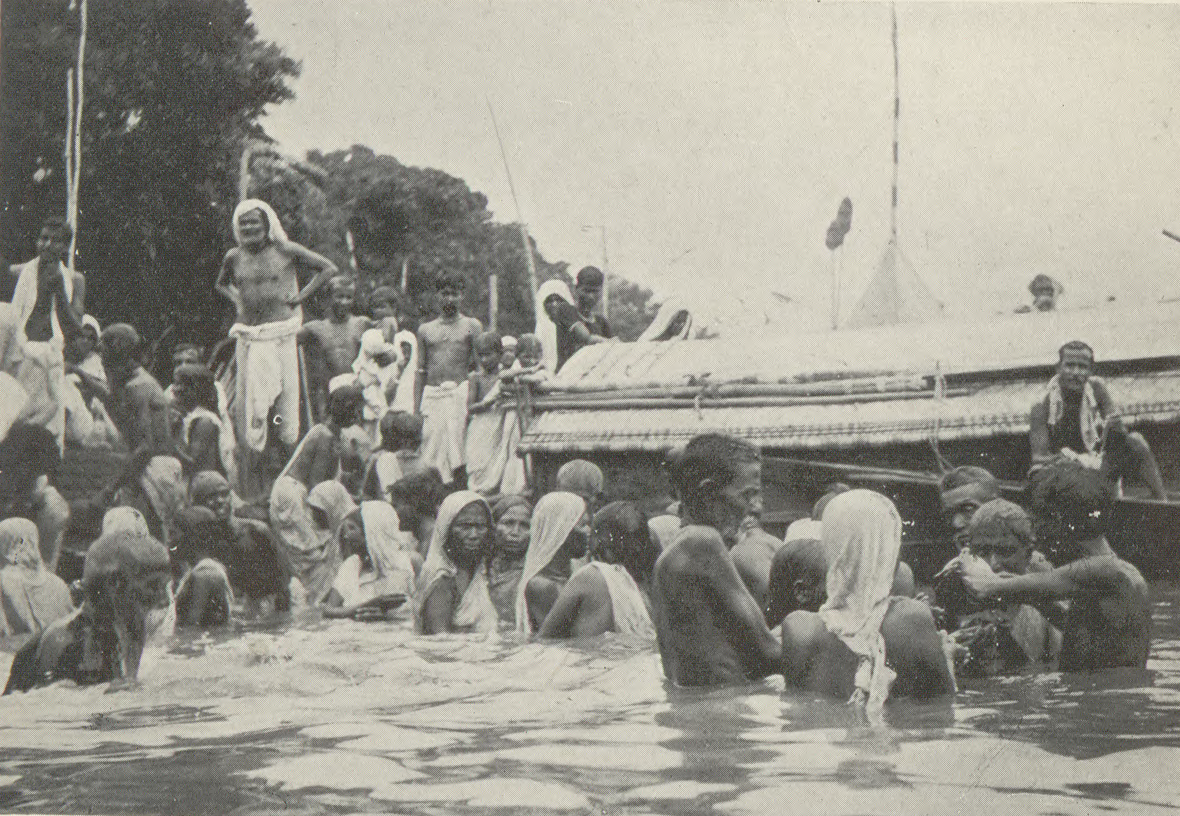
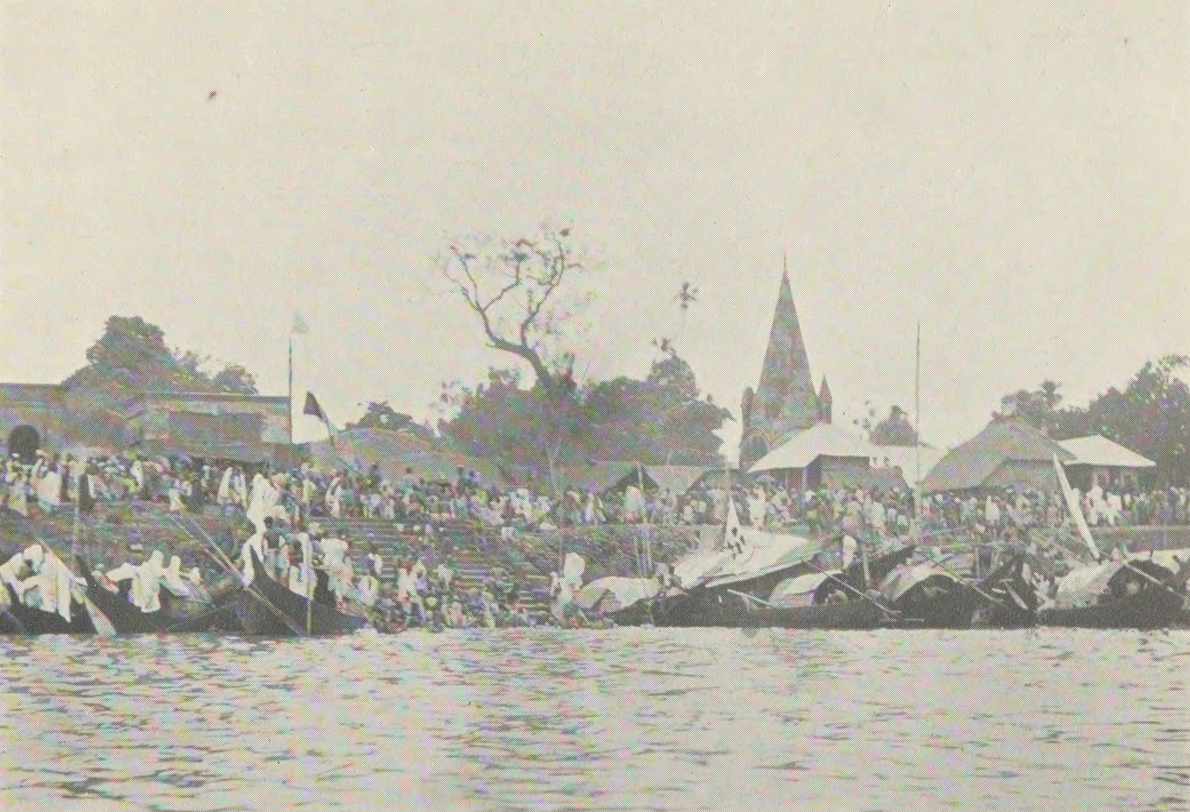
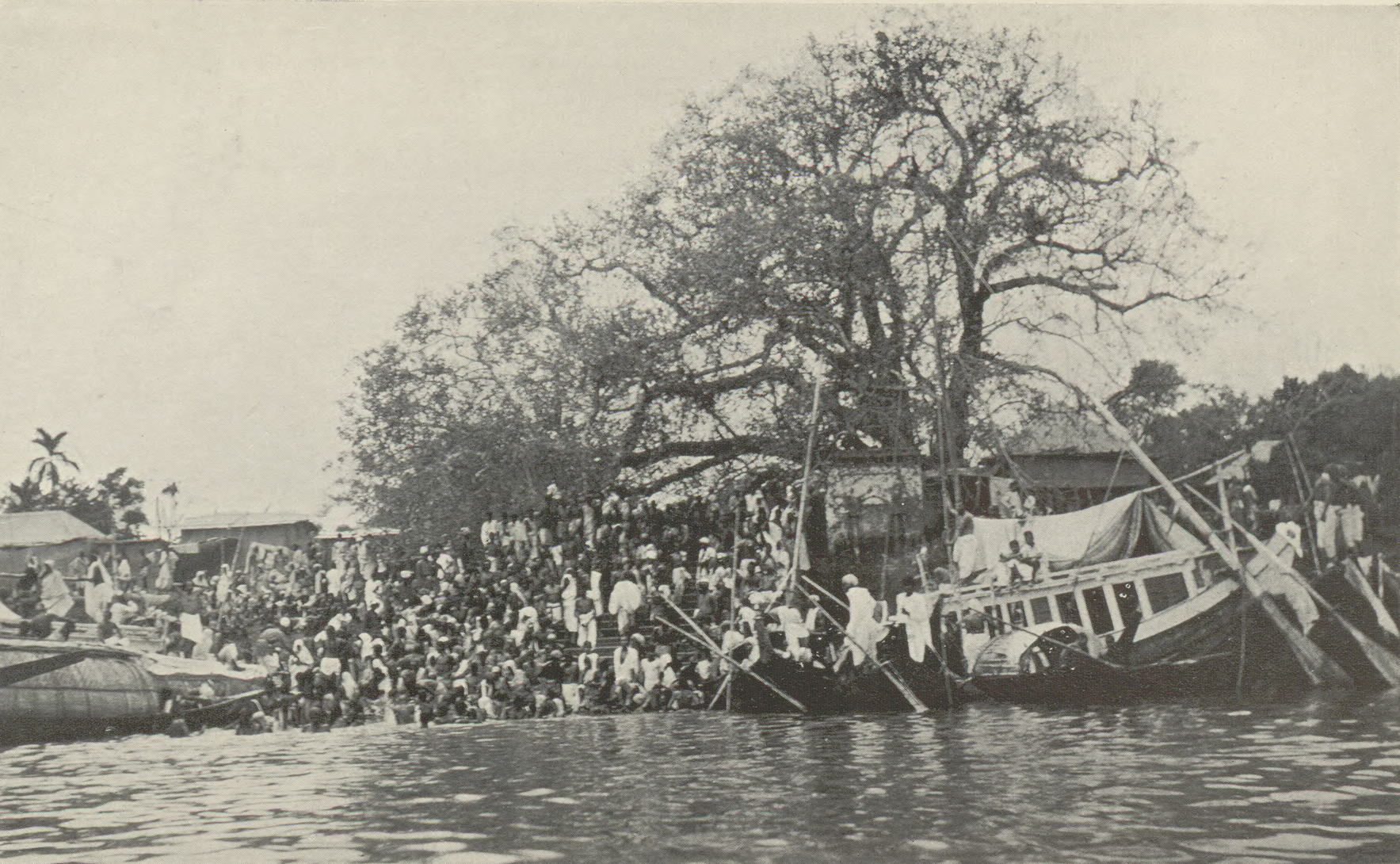
- Langalbandh Festival in 1906 - photographs taken by Francis Bradley Bradley-Birt
- Genre: Religious, Cultural
- Date: Eighth day of Chaitra month
- Frequency: Yearly
- Venue: Langalbandh, Sonargaon, Narayanganj
- Coordinates: 23.6468°N 90.5631°E
- Country: Bangladesh
- Most recent: 29 March 2023
- Next event: 16 April 2024
- Participants: 1.5 M

Langalbandh (Bengali: লাঙ্গলবন্দ, literally, the place where the plough stopped), is a holy Hindu pilgrimage site located on the banks of the Brahmaputra River in Narayanganj District of Bangladesh. Punyasnan is held on the eighth tithi of Shukla Paksha of Chaitra month. At this time, many pilgrims come here for holy bath. According to legend, Parshuram Muni was cleansed of his sins by taking a bath in this stream of Langalbanda. Devotees have been taking this Ashtami-Punyasna for many years, remembering the absolution of Parshuram Muni from the scriptures.

The annual religious bathing ritual in Langalbandh draws millions of Hindu devotees from Bangladesh and also neighboring India and Nepal.

== Ghats ==
Many ghats have been constructed here so that the visiting devotees can take holy bath without any hindrance. These embanked ghats have various aesthetic names. Like - Annapurna Ghat, Prematala Ghat, Jaykali Ghat, Bardeswari Ghat, Gandhi Ghat, Shankar Ghat, Kalidah Ghat, Shikhari Ghat etc. Besides these ghats, many temples and ashrams have been built here.

== The 2015 stampede ==
During the annual mela falling on 27 March over 1.5 million devotees thronged Langalbandh for the ritual bathing. Ten Hindu devotees were killed and 30 others were injured in a stampede during the 'Astami snan', the Hindu holy bathing ritual. The unexpectedly large crowd and the lack of proper preparedness of the authorities are said to have contributed to the fatalities in the stampede.
