= Hare Street =

Road in Kolkata, India

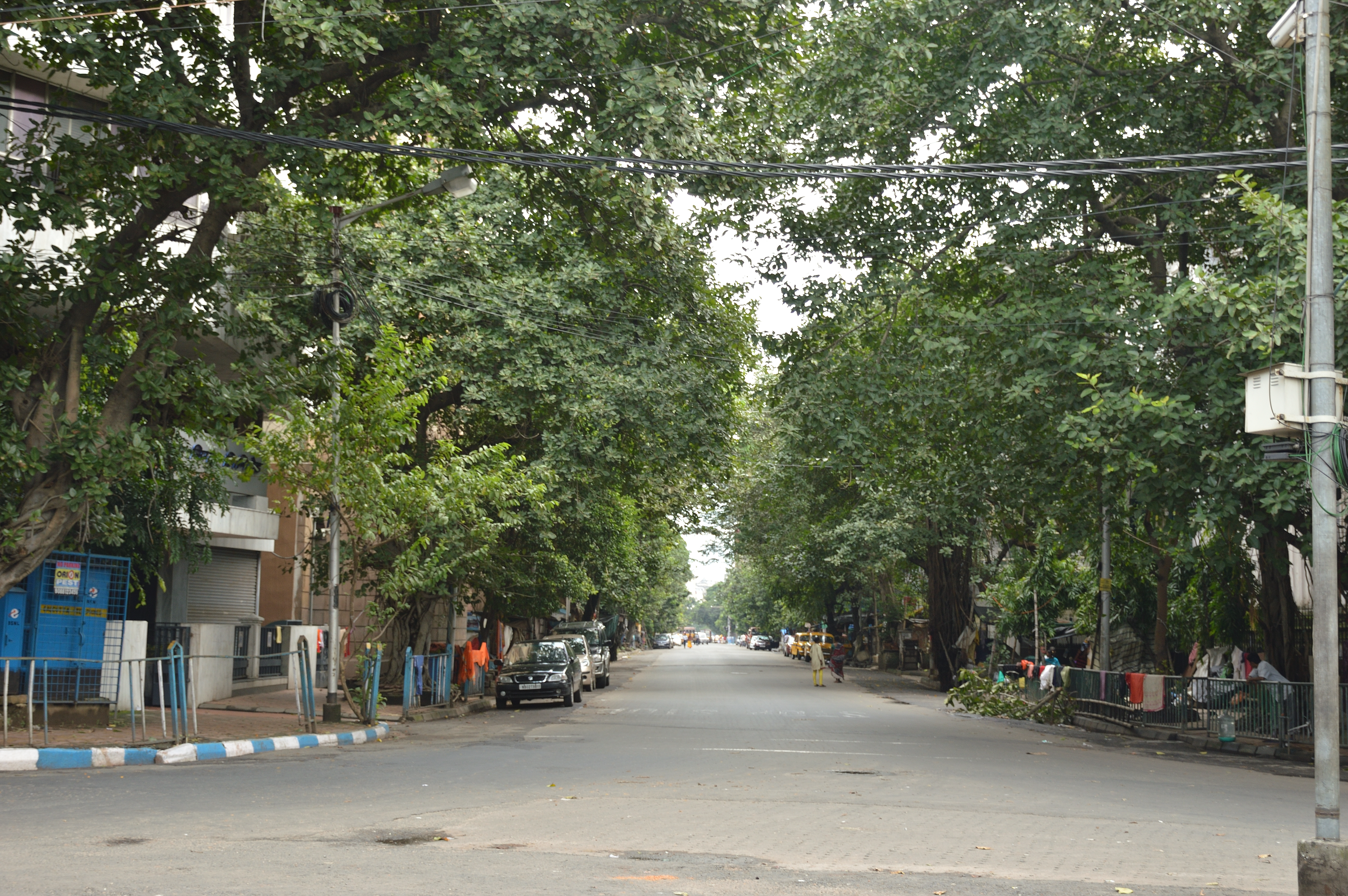
- Hare Street, Kolkata
- Interactive map of Hare Street
- Maintained by: Kolkata Municipal Corporation
- Location: Kolkata, India
- Postal code: 700001
- Nearest Kolkata Metro station: Mahakaran
- Coordinates: 22.571789°N 88.345167°E
- West end: Strand Road
- East end: Council House Street-Netaji Subhas Road junction

Hare Street is a road in the Indian city of Kolkata, in Kolkata district, West Bengal, India. It connects the junction of Council House Street and Netaji Subhas Road in B.B.D. Bagh to Millennium Park on Strand Road.

== History ==
Hare Street was constructed by the Lottery Committee.

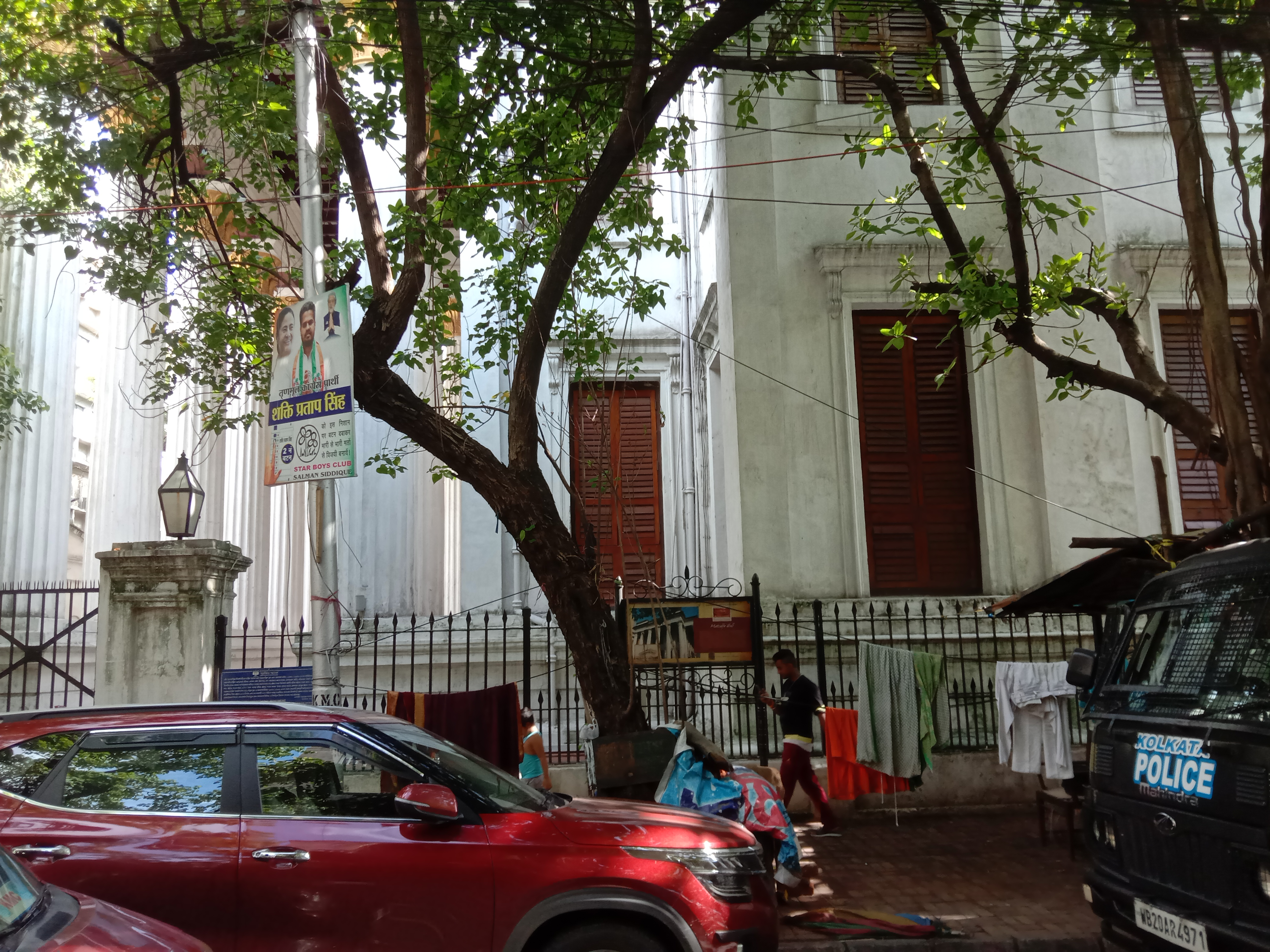
Metcalfe Hall, a heritage building in Kolkata, as seen from Hare Street.

David Hare (1775–1842), Scottish watch-maker, philanthropist and educator, used to live at Nicco House situated here and the street is named after him.

== Geography ==
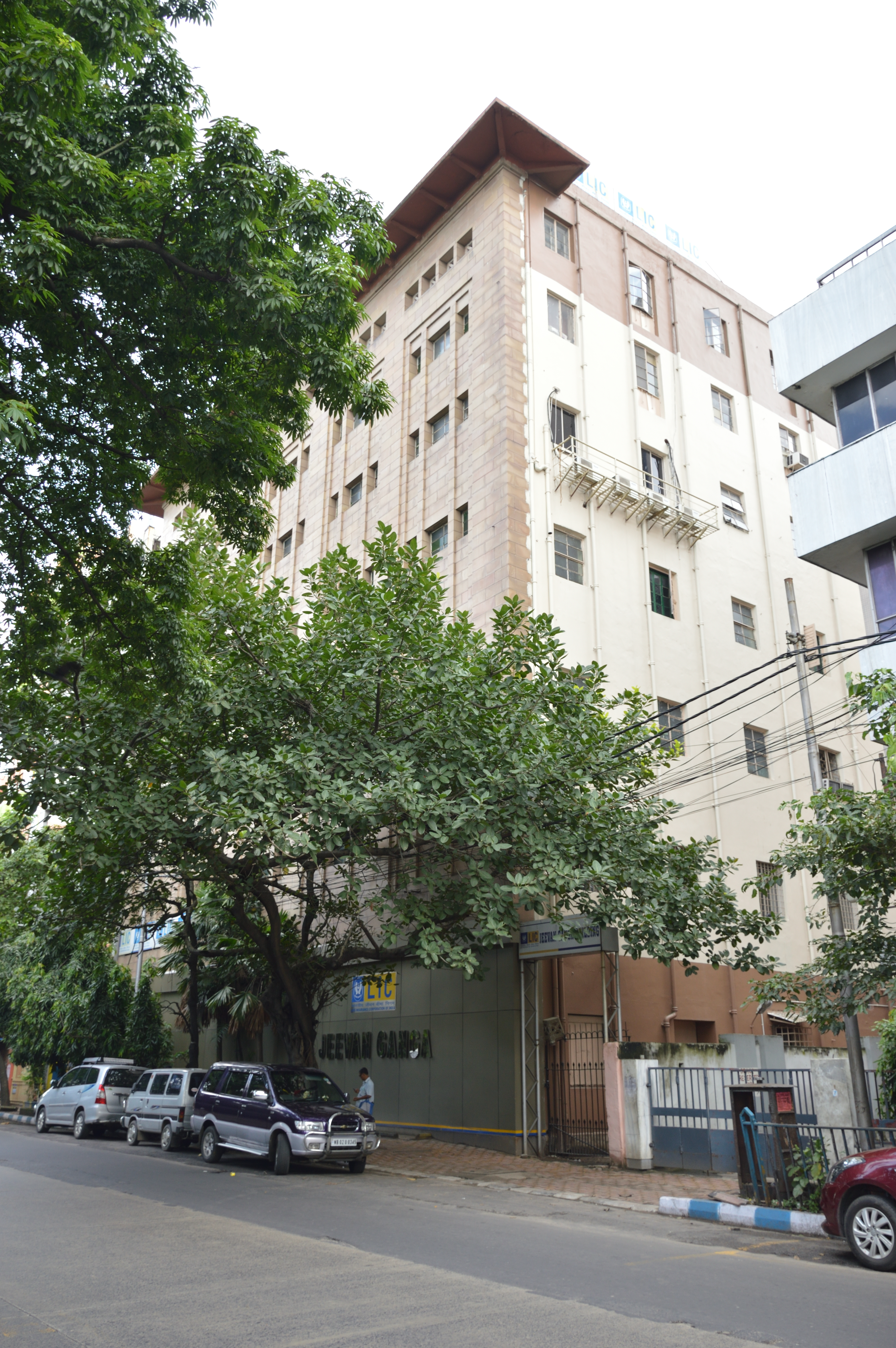
Jeevan Ganga Building (LIC), on the crossing of Hare Street and Strand Road

=== Police district ===
Hare Street police station is part of the Central division of Kolkata Police. It is located at 42, Chittaranjan Avenue, Kolkata-700069.

Taltala Women police station covers all police districts under the jurisdiction of the Central division, i.e. Bowbazar, Burrabazar, Girish Park, Hare Street, Jorasanko, Muchipara, New Market, Taltala and Posta.
