= Lord Castlereagh (disambiguation) =

Lord Castlereagh may refer to:

- Lord Castlereagh (1769–1822), Anglo-Irish politician
- Marquess of Londonderry, courtesy title for heirs to the peerage
- Lord Castlereagh (painting), an 1809 portrait by Thomas Lawrence
- Lord Castlereagh (1802 ship), named after the politician
- Lord Castlereagh (1803 ship), named after the politician

== See also ==
- Castlereagh, New South Wales, a suburb of Sydney named after the politician
