= List of shipyard locations on the Hooghly River in the early 19th century =

The following list is based on locations listed in Phipps (1840). The locations are listed in order as one goes down the Hooghly River towards the river's mouth. The name in the first column of the table is the name one encounters most frequently in British East India Company (EIC) sources. East and West in the table refer to the banks of the river.

EIC name	Modern name	Bank	Notes
Chandenagore	Chandannagar	West	French
Tittaghur	Titagarh	East	Countess of Sutherland (1801 ship), the largest ship built on the Hooghly in the early 19th century, was built here
Cosipore	Cossipore	East	
Sulkea	Salkia	West	Sulkea/Salkia/Salkhia/Salkee was originally a place where salt was brought and stored in warehouses
Howrah	Howrah	West	Opposite Calcutta
Calcutta	Kolkata		Nonsuch (1781 ship) was the first large ship built here
Clive Street	Clive Street	East	Roughly opposite Howrah; vessels built here include David Clark (1816 ship) and Elizabeth (1816 ship)
Seebpore	Shibpur	West	Sibpour
Kidderpore	Khidirpur	East	Founded 1795; one geographical mile from Fort William
Fort Gloucester	Fort Gloster	West	c. 12.5 geographical miles from Fort William

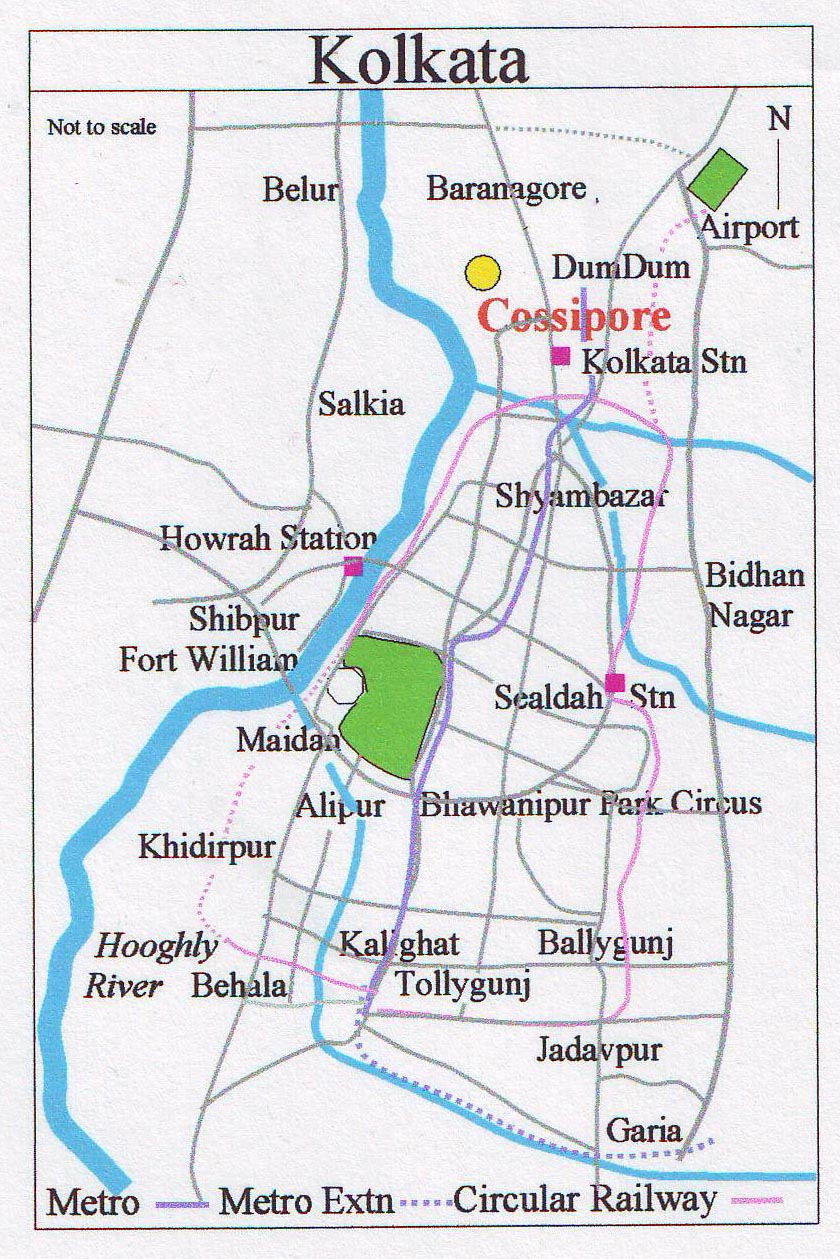

After the construction of the Strand Road, in the 1820s, shipbuilding was concentrated at Sulkea, Howrah, and Kidderpore. The greatest shipbuilding years on the Hooghly up to 1839 were 1813 (21 vessels and 10,376 tons (bm)), 1801 (19 vessels and 10,079 tons (bm)), and 1816 (18 vessels and 8,198 tons (bm)). (This data does not include vessels built for the Bengal Pilot Service.)

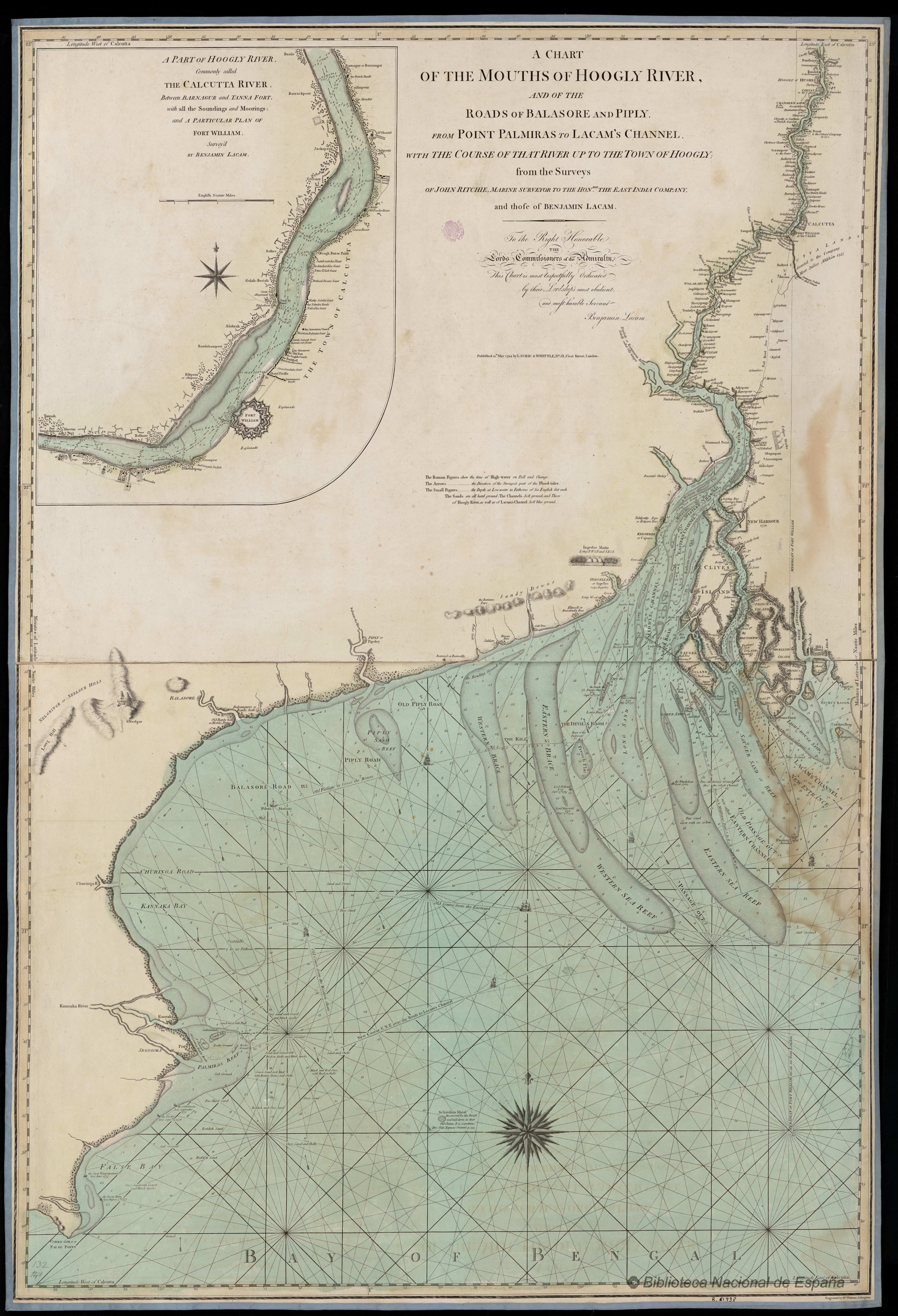
British chart of the Hooghli from Balasore up to a point north of Calcutta, 1794. It shows Salkee, Sibpour, Kidderpore, and Gloucester Fort
