= Lord Walsingham (1786 EIC ship) =

History

British East India Company
- Name: Lord Walsingham
- Owner: EIC voyages 1-2: Anthony Brough; EIC voyages 3-6: Richard Holbert
- Builder: Jacob Preston, Great Yarmouth, or Hill
- Launched: 7 December 1786
- Fate: Sold for breaking up 1802

General characteristics
- Type: East Indiaman
- Tons burthen: 559, or 561, or 561179/94, (bm)
- Length: Overall: 122 ft 1 in (37.2 m); Keel: 97 ft 2 in (29.6 m)
- Beam: 32 ft 11 in (10.0 m)
- Depth of hold: 13 ft 11 in (4.2 m)
- Sail plan: Full-rigged ship
- Complement: 60
- Armament: 18 × 6-pounder guns
- Notes: Three decks

Lord Walsingham was launched in 1786 as an East Indiaman. She made six voyages for the British East India Company (EIC) before she was sold for breaking up in 1802.

== Career ==
=== EIC voyage #1 (1787–1788) ===
Captain John Paiba sailed from the Downs on 1 April 1787, bound for China. Lord Walsingham arrived at Whampoa Anchorage on 12 November. Homeward bound, she crossed the Second Bar on 20 March 1788. She reached St Helena on 11 August and the Isles of Scilly on 1 November. She arrived back at the Downs on 11 November.

In 1790 Lord Walsingham caught on fire off New Tavern Fort, but the fire was soon extinguished.

=== EIC voyage #2 (1790–1791) ===
Captain James Young sailed from the Downs on 18 May 1790, bound for China. Lord Walsingham arrived at Whampoa on 3 November. Homeward bound, she crossed the Second Bar on 8 February 1791, reached St Helena on 7 July, and arrived back at the Downs on 6 September.

=== EIC voyage #3 (1793–1794) ===
Captain Young sailed from Portsmouth on 7 July 1793, bound for China. Lord Walsingham reached Batavia on 6 November and arrived at Whampoa on 31 December. Homeward bound, she crossed the Second Bar on 3 March 1794, reached St Helena on 18 June, and arrived back at the Downs on 8 September.

=== EIC voyage #4 (1795–1796) ===
Capt James Young sailed from Portsmouth on 18 June 1795, bound for Calcutta. Lord Walsingham reached Diamond Harbour on 26 October and arrived at Calcutta on 10 November. Homeward bound, she was at Saugor on 10 January 1796. She reached the Cape of Good Hope on 19 April and St Helena on 5 May. She arrived back at the Downs on 2 August.

=== EIC voyage #5 (1797–1799) ===
Captain Thomas Smales acquired a letter of marque on 4 April 1797. He sailed from Portsmouth on 6 June, bound for Madras and Calcutta. Lord Walsingham reached the Cape on 4 September and Madras on 2 December. She arrived at Kedgeree on 25 January 1798. Homeward bound, she was at Saugor on 3 May, the Cape on 22 August, and St Helena on 17 November. She arrived back at the Downs on 14 February.

=== EIC voyage #6 (1800–1801) ===
Captain Smales sailed from Portsmouth on 28 June 1800, bound for Calcutta. Lord Walsingham arrived at Kedgeree on 8 January 1801. Homeward bound, she was at Saugor on 8 April. She left in company with Earl Spencer and Countess of Sutherland. The pilot left them on 12 April. Countess proved to be a much faster sailer than the two East Indiamen and parted from them on 8 April. Lord Walsingham reached St Helena on 4 August, and arrived at the Downs on 31 October.

== Fate ==
Lord Walsingham was sold in 1802 for breaking up.
