= Earl Spencer (1795 EIC ship) =

History

British East India Company
- Name: Earl Spencer
- Owner: Voyages #1-3: James Duncan; Voyage #4: Moses Agar; Voyage #5: Thomas Welladvice; Voyages #6-7: Martin Lindsay
- Builder: Perry, Blackwall
- Launched: 18 July 1795
- Notes: The National Archives splits the eight voyages Earl Spencer made for the East India Company (EIC) under three sets of records. Hackman has only the middle six, which the British Library groups together under "Earl Spencer (2)", but has a number of references to owners, masters, and dates that make it clear that voyages 1-7 below are the same vessel. Hackman also states that after voyage #7, the government chartered Earl Spencer for a voyage transporting convicts to Australia. Her return voyage was her eighth for the EIC. Bateson states that Earl Spencer was launched on the Thames in 1803. However, there is no evidence for this and Bateson may simply have mistaken changes in ownership and repairs around 1803 for a new vessel.

General characteristics
- Tons burthen: 644, or 64434/94, 672, (bm)
- Length: 135 ft 7 in (41.3 m) (overall); 110 ft 7 1/2 in (33.7 m) (keel)
- Beam: 33 ft 2 in (10.1 m)
- Depth of hold: 13 ft 8 in (4.2 m)
- Propulsion: Sail
- Complement: 1795: 40; 1797: 30?; 1803: 80; 1813:54
- Armament: 1795: 14 × 9-pounder guns; 1797: 30 × 6 & 9-pounder guns; 1803: 30 × 6 & 9-pounder guns; 1813:16 guns

Earl Spencer was an East Indiaman, launched in 1795 for the British East India Company (EIC). She made seven voyages for the EIC until in 1811-12 the government took her up to transport convicts to Australia in 1813. On her return voyage from Australia she sailed via China, where she carried a cargo back to England for the EIC.

== EIC voyages ==
As most of her voyages took place during wartime, Earl Spencer frequently sailed under a letter of marque that authorized her to engage in offensive actions against the French, not just defensive. When the vessel changed masters, a new letter was issued. The outbreak of war after a period of peace also required a new letter.

=== EIC voyage #1 (1795-96) ===
Captain Thomas Denton left The Downs on 26 September 1795, bound for Bengal. His letter of marque had been issued on 5 September. On 20 Feb 1796 Earl Spencer reached Kedgeree. Homeward bound, she was at Saugor on 3 April, reached False Bay on 12 August and the Cape on 4 September. She arrived at Crookhaven on 27 November and Long Reach on 16 December.

=== EIC voyage #2 (1797-99) ===
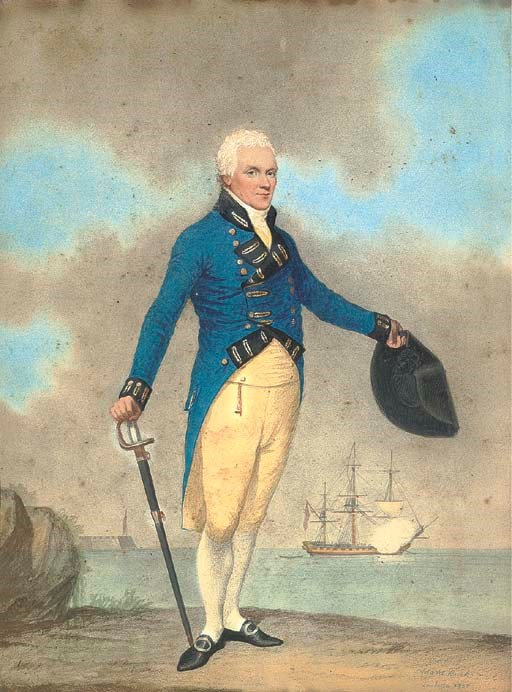
Portrait of Captain Charles Raitt in the uniform of the East India Company by Adam Buck, London 1800

Captain Charles Raitt left Portsmouth on 5 June 1797 for Madras and Bengal. He had a letter of marque issued on 13 March 1797. Earl Spencer reached Simons Bay on 4 September and Madras on 2 December. She arrived at Kedgeree on 26 January 1798. Homeward bound, she was at Saugor on 20 April, Simons Bay on 22 August, the Cape on 30 September, and St Helena on 17 November. She arrived at The Downs on 3 February 1799.

=== EIC voyage #3 (1800-01) ===
Captain Charles Raitt left Portsmouth on 28 June 1800, bound for Bengal. Earl Spencer arrived at Kedgeree on 8 January 1801. Homeward bound, she was at Saugor on 7 April. She left in company with Lord Walsingham and Countess of Sutherland. The pilot left them on 12 April. Countess proved to be a much faster sailer than the two East Indiamen and parted from them on 8 April.

Earl Spencer reached St Helena on 4 August and arrived at the Downs on 1 November.

=== EIC voyage #4 (1803-05) ===
Charles Raitt was again captain of Earl Spencer on her third voyage. The Napoleonic Wars having broken out after the one year of peace following the Treaty of Amiens, he received a new letter of marque on 8 June 1803. Raitt left Portsmouth on 30 June 1803, bound for Bengal. Earl Spencer reached Rio de Janeiro on 16 September.

The Indiamen Earl Spencer, Lord Melville, Princess Mary, Northampton, Anna, Ann, Glory, and Essex left Rio on 13 October. They were in company with the 74-gun third rate ships of the line HMS Albion, HMS Sceptre, and HMS Russell, and the fourth rate HMS Grampus. Three days later Albion and Sceptre separated from the rest of the ships.

Earl Spencer arrived at Diamond Harbour on 11 February 1804. She was at Saugor on 26 April, and Madras on 16 August, before reaching St Helena on 31 December. She arrived at The Downs on 19 March 1805.

=== EIC voyage #5 (1806-07) ===
A change of captain meant a new letter of marque. Captain George Heming received a letter of marque on 21 July 1806. He sailed from Portsmouth on 9 August, bound for Bombay. Earl Spencer reached Rio de Janeiro on 13 November, the Cape on 15 January 1807, and Colombo on 5 April. She arrived at Bombay on 21 May. Homeward bound, she was at the Cape on 11 October, reached St Helena on 24 October, and arrived at the Downs on 29 December.

=== EIC voyage #6 (1808-10) ===
Captain George Heming sailed from Portsmouth on 10 June 1808, bound for Madras and Bengal. Earl Spencer was at Madeira on 24 June, and arrived at Diamond Harbour on 16 November. On the way she and Monarch rescued all of the passengers and all but 16 of the crew of Travers, which had hit a rock on 7 November at 15°38′N 94°20′E.

On 2 January 1809 Earl Spencer was at Calcutta. There Heming joined Captain Kymer of Lord Castlereagh and Captain Hawes of Monarch in letters of protest against the Royal Navy's impressment of seamen from the ships; Earl Spencer had lost 23 men, including some petty officers, out of her crew of 87 men to the Navy. Earl Spencer was at Saugor on 14 March.

On 2 May 1809 she departed from the Sandheads with a convoy of four other Indiamen and several smaller vessels, all under the escort of HMS Victor. On 24 May a storm split the convoy and Victor and the small ships separately lost touch with the Indiamen. One of the five, Monarch, had a leak that had worsened. She received permission on 25 May from Captain John Dale of Streatham, the senior EIC captain of the five vessels and so commodore, to sail to Penang. Hawes, Monarch's captain, requested that another of the Indiamen accompany him in case Monarch foundered. Dale detailed Earl Spencer to go with Monarch. The three remaining Indiamen, Streatham, Europe, and Lord Keith continued on their way while hoping to meet up with Victor. The French frigate Caroline captured Streatham and Europe in the action of 31 May 1809. Lord Keith too exchanged broadsides with Caroline and was damaged, however she escaped and sailed to Penang to repair.

Monarch and Lord Spencer arrived at Penang on 4 June. Lord Keith arrived on 10 June. Repairs completed, all three then sailed together and reached St Helena on 14 November; they arrived at The Downs on 19 or 20 January 1810.

=== EIC voyage #7 (1810-11) ===
Captain George Heming left Portsmouth on 9 June 1810 bound for Bengal. Earl Spencer reached Madeira on 25 June and arrived at Diamond Harbour on 12 December. HMS Leda escorted the Indiamen on the voyage, and on their arrival at Kedgeree on 15 December, Captain George Sayer, captain of Leda, wrote a letter of commendation for Heming and his officers for their conduct on the voyage. On 3 February 1811 Earl Spencer was at Saugor, and on 20 February she was at Madras. She reached St Helena on 16 June and arrived at The Downs on 30 August.

The government then took up Earl Spencer to transport convicts to Australia.

== Convict transport and EIC voyage #8 ==
Under the command of William Mitchell, Earl Spencer left England on 2 June 1813. She sailed via Madeira, escorted for the early part of the voyage by HMS Kangaroo, and arrived at Port Jackson on 9 October 1813. She transported 200 male convicts, four of whom died on the voyage. An officer and 38 men of the 73rd Regiment of Foot provided the guards for the prisoners. Some 20 free settlers came too as passengers. Aboard the ship was the first steam engine brought out to Australia.

Earl Spencer left Port Jackson bound for China, but there is no date given. Between her arrival in New South Wales and her departure for China, she engaged in whaling.

Earl Spencer arrived at Whampoa anchorage on 23 October 1814. She passed the Bocca Tigris on 12 November, reaching the Cape on 26 March 1815, and St Helena on 24 April. From there she sailed "towards England" on 20 June.

== Fate ==
The last listing in Lloyd's Register and the Register of Shipping for Earl Spencer was in 1820, with the listing unchanged from 1813.
