= Countess of Sutherland (1801 ship) =

UK India-built merchant ship 1801–1821

History

United Kingdom
- Name: Countess of Sutherland
- Owner: 1801:Hamilton & Aberdeen; 1802:R. Anderson
- Builder: Hamilton & Aberdeen, Tittaghur
- Launched: 6 November 1800
- Captured: 1803
- Fate: Broken up 1821

General characteristics
- Tons burthen: 1443, or 1445, or 1500, or 150911/94, (bm)
- Length: Overall:162 ft 6 in (49.5 m); Keel:127 ft 9 3/4 in (39.0 m)
- Beam: 46 ft 1 in (14.0 m)
- Armament: 18 guns
- Notes: Teak-built; three decks

Countess of Sutherland was launched in 1801, at Tittaghur on the Hooghly River, about 15 miles upstream from Calcutta. She made one voyage from Calcutta to England for the British East India Company in 1801–1802. The French captured her in 1803, as she was sailing from Bengal to China. They used her as a hulk until she was broken up c.1821.

== Career ==
After her launch at Tittaghur, Countess of Sutherland arrived at Calcutta on 4 January 1801, for completion.

Captain Charles Eggleston left Bengal 12 April, bound for England. Countess of Sutherland left in company with Earl Spencer and Lord Walsingham. The pilot left them on 12 April. Countess proved to be a much faster sailer than the two East Indiamen and parted from them on 8 April.

Countess of Sutherland encountered poor weather until 16 June; thereafter she suffered increasing damage from hurricanes. She was dismasted on 8 July. At daylight on 15 July, she discovered that she was near Delagoa Bay. On 19 July, she anchored at St Francis's Bay. She remained there repairing the ship and watering until 28 August, when she set sail for the Cape of Good Hope.

Countess of Sutherland was at the Cape on 6 September. She was expected to sail from there in about a month from 16 September. Countess of Sutherland reached Saint Helena on 10 November, and arrived at Long Reach on 27 January 1802.

She was admitted to the Registry of Great Britain on 7 April 1802. She enters Lloyd's Register in 1802 with Eggleston, master, and trade London–India.

She sailed for Bengal on 27 July. The EIC did not engage her.

On 21 November, she had the misfortune to encounter the 20-gun French corvette Berceau, of Contre-Admiral Charles-Alexandre Durand Linois's expedition to the Indian Ocean. Countess of Sutherland was sailing from Bengal to China with 7500 bales of cotton and 4500 measures of rice when captured.

She had probably left Bengal before the news of war reached Bengal. This would explain why she was sailing for the Straits of Sunda; she may also have intended to call at Bencoolen, which her captor and Sémillante would raid after her capture.

== Fate ==
Countess of Sutherland arrived at Mauritius prior to 15 December 1803. Matthew Flinders was a prisoner at Mauritius when she arrived there. He estimated her value as a prize at £100,000. She was not on a list of vessels found at Port Napoleon at the time of its capture during the Invasion of Isle de France. However, by one report she had been hulked, and was broken up in 1821.
