= Elizabeth (1816 ship) =

Merchant ship built at Calcutta, British India (1816–1834)

History

United Kingdom
- Name: Elizabeth
- Owner: Nichols & Co., (1834)
- Builder: J.Gilmore & Co., Clive Street, Calcutta
- Launched: 19 December 1816
- Fate: Last listed in 1834

General characteristics
- Tons burthen: 50486/94 or 505, or 506, or 520, or 527, or 544 (bm)
- Propulsion: Sail

Elizabeth was a merchant ship built at Calcutta, British India, in 1816. She made one voyage transporting convicts from Ireland to Australia. She also made one voyage for the British East India Company (EIC). This was the last voyage that any vessel made for the EIC. Elizabeth is no longer listed after 1834.

== Career ==
Elizabeth spent much of her career trading between India and England under a license from the EIC.

Under the command of Walter Cock and surgeon Joseph Hughes, she left Cork, Ireland on 27 August 1827, and arrived in Sydney on 12 January 1828. She embarked 194 female convicts and had two convict deaths en route. Elizabeth departed Port Jackson in April, bound for Mauritius.

Before she left, on 4 April at Garden Island, New South Wales, the chief mate, Mr. Penberthy fought a duel with Mr. Atkins, the Third Mate. Mr. Chalmers, the Second Mate, was Atkins's second. Atkins shot Penberthy, who later died on Elizabeth. The authorities arrested Atkins and Chalmers and indicted them for murder. On 2 May the jury found them guilty of manslaughter; they were sentenced to three months in gaol.

At some point she transferred her registry from Calcutta to Bombay. The East-India register and directory for 1827 listed her as registered at Calcutta with W. Swann, master, and Gilmore and Co., owners. The East-India register and directory for 1829, however, had not yet picked her up.

The Register of Shipping for 1833 showed Elizabeth, Craigie, master, and Nichols & Co., owner. Her trade was described as London—New South Wales, changing to London—China.

Captain John Craigie sailed from the Downs on 25 July 1833, bound for China and Halifax. Craigie died at sea on 2 August on the way to China.

By 5 December Elizabeth was at Copang Bay. She arrived at Whampoa Anchorage on 2 February 1834. Outward bound, she crossed the Second Bar on 12 March, reached Saint Helena on 19 June, and arrived at Halifax, Nova Scotia on 18 August.

In August 1833 Parliament passed legislation that ended the EIC's monopoly on the China trade and the company ceased its mercantile operations. Elizabeth's voyage was the last voyage conducted under the EIC's auspices.

Elizabeth returned to London in December 1834. She is no longer listed in Lloyd's Register in 1835.
