= Netaji Subhas Road, Kolkata =

Road in Kolkata, India

Netaji Subhas Road
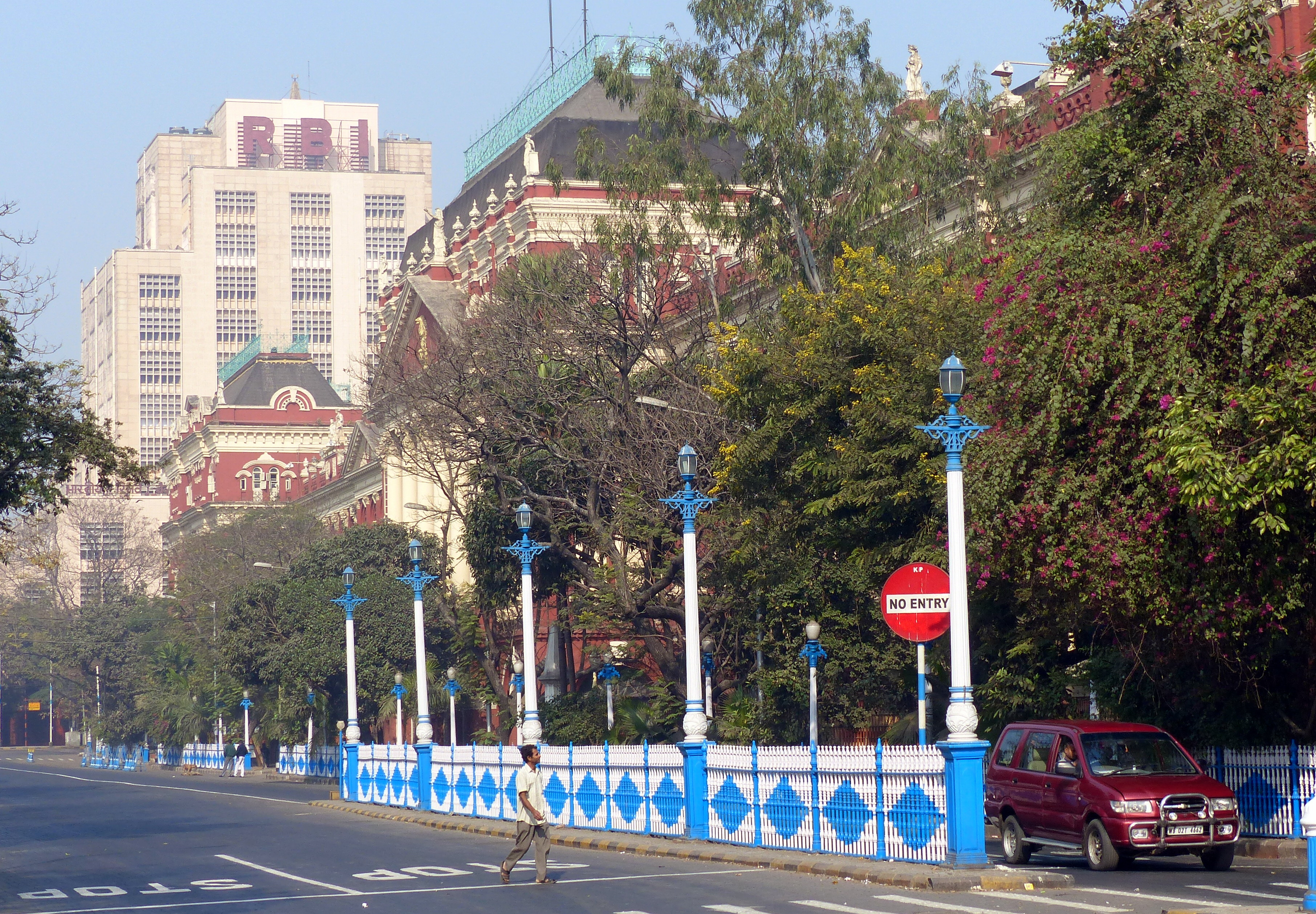
- View of RBI (Kolkata) from Netaji Subhas Road
- Interactive map of Netaji Subhas Road
- Former name: Clive Street
- Maintained by: Kolkata Municipal Corporation
- Location: Kolkata, India
- Postal code: 700001
- Nearest Kolkata Metro station: Mahakaran
- Coordinates: 22°34′34″N 88°20′56″E
- North end: Jorabagan
- South end: Fort William

Netaji Subhas Road (N. S. Road; previously known as Clive Street) is a main thoroughfare in Central Kolkata that runs predominantly north to south in the B. B. D. Bagh neighborhood.

== Name ==
The road is named after Netaji Subhas Chandra Bose, a leader of the Indian independence movement. The road was previously known as Clive Road, after Robert Clive, the first British governor of the Bengal Presidency.

== Thoroughfare ==
The street starts near the Kolkata General Post Office and crosses Canning Street, a major market, and another arterial road Brabourne Road (near the Brabourne Road Flyover), and finally ends at an intersection with another arterial road, MG Road. Strand Road runs parallel to Netaji Subhas Road on its east side, along Hooghly River.

== Landmarks ==
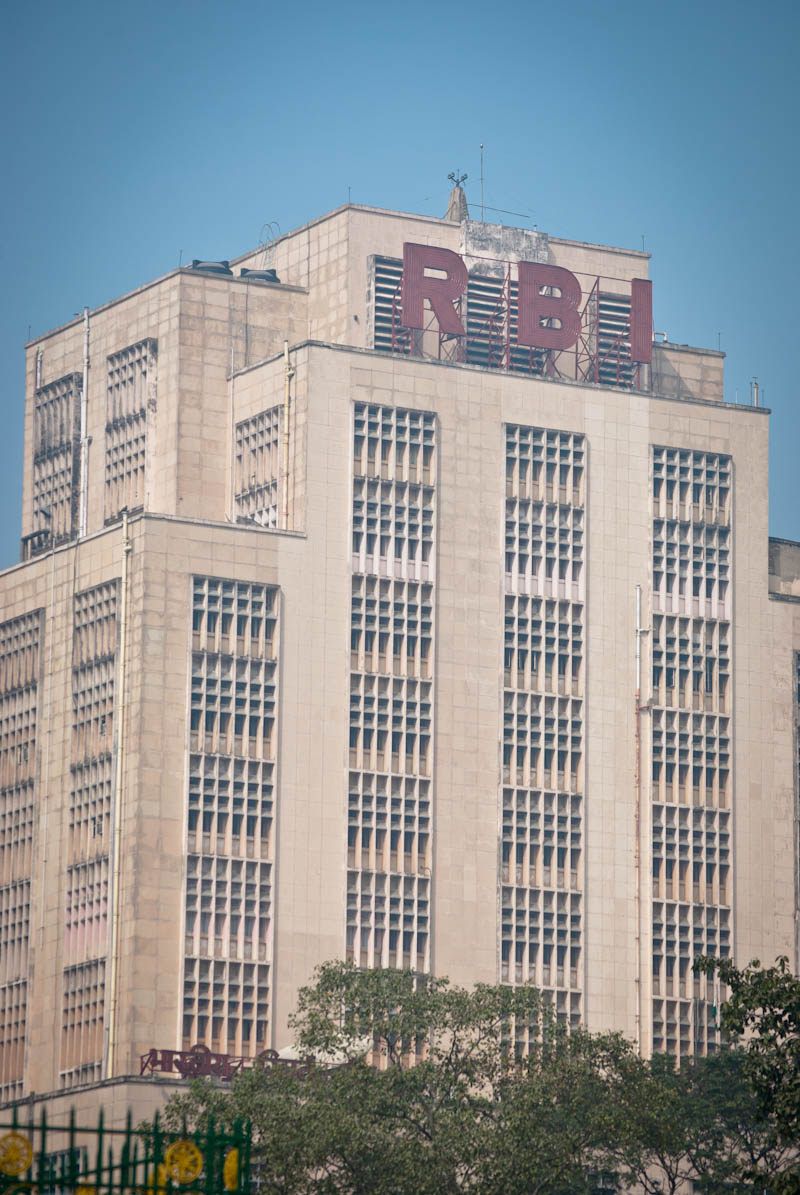
Reserve Bank of India Building on Netaji Subhas Road, Kolkata

The road has several buildings from the British Raj era which are examples of Victorian colonial architecture. Landmarks on the street include:

- The General Post Office Building, the head post office of Kolkata.
- The Reserve Bank of India Building, which houses the Eastern Zonal Office of the Reserve Bank of India.
- The western side of the Writer's Building, the seat of Government of West Bengal.
- Lal Dighi, a large square-shaped park and lake, which forms the B. B. D. Bagh is on one side of road.
- Standard Chartered Building.
- Gillander House.
- Security House.
- Exchange House.
- McLeod House.
- Grindlays Bank Building - once head office of Grindlays Bank.
- Marshall House.
- Allahbad Bank Building, the head office of Allahabad Bank.
- Jessop House, the former head office of Jessop & Company, now used by the Government of West Bengal.
- Gupta Mansion Market.
- Coal Bhawan, the registered office of Coal India Limited.
- Duncan House, a large colonial building, once the seat of British conglomerate Duncan Brothers, and now the registered office of RPG-Duncan Group.
- Balmer Lawrie House, the head office of Balmer Lawrie.
- Collectorate Office.
- Fairlie Place, the headquarters of Eastern Railway, a large complex which spreads to Strand Road on other end, originally built by the East Indian Railway.

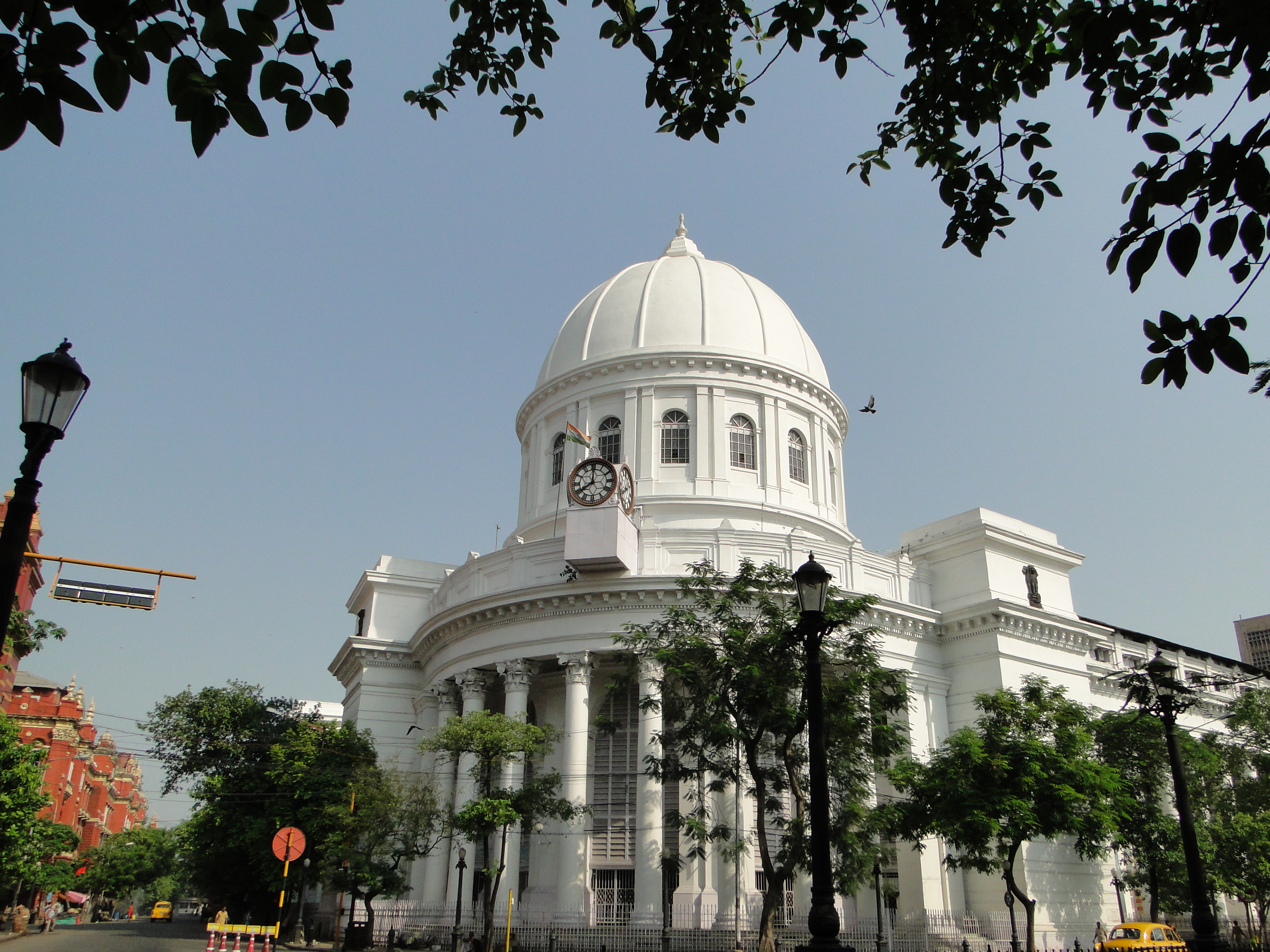
Kolkata General Post Office building located on Netaji Subhas Road

Other government offices on Netaji Subhas Road include the West Bengal State Election Commission. The Calcutta Stock Exchange is located at Lyons Range, a few meters off the street behind the Writer's Building.

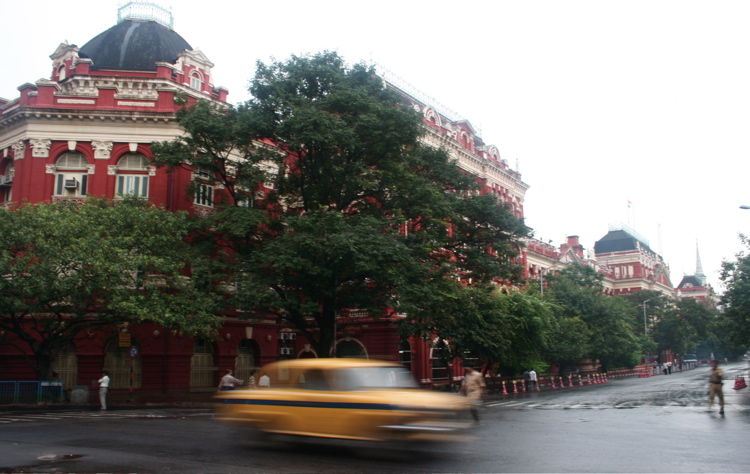
Writer's Building as seen from Netaji Subhas Road

Due to its location in the center of Kolkata's business district, most corporate insurance companies have either main, liaison or branch offices in and around Netaji Subhas Road, and many major banks of India have their main or commercial branch on the road. The main markets in Kolkata for machinery, other hardware materials, and scrap metal are located on the street.

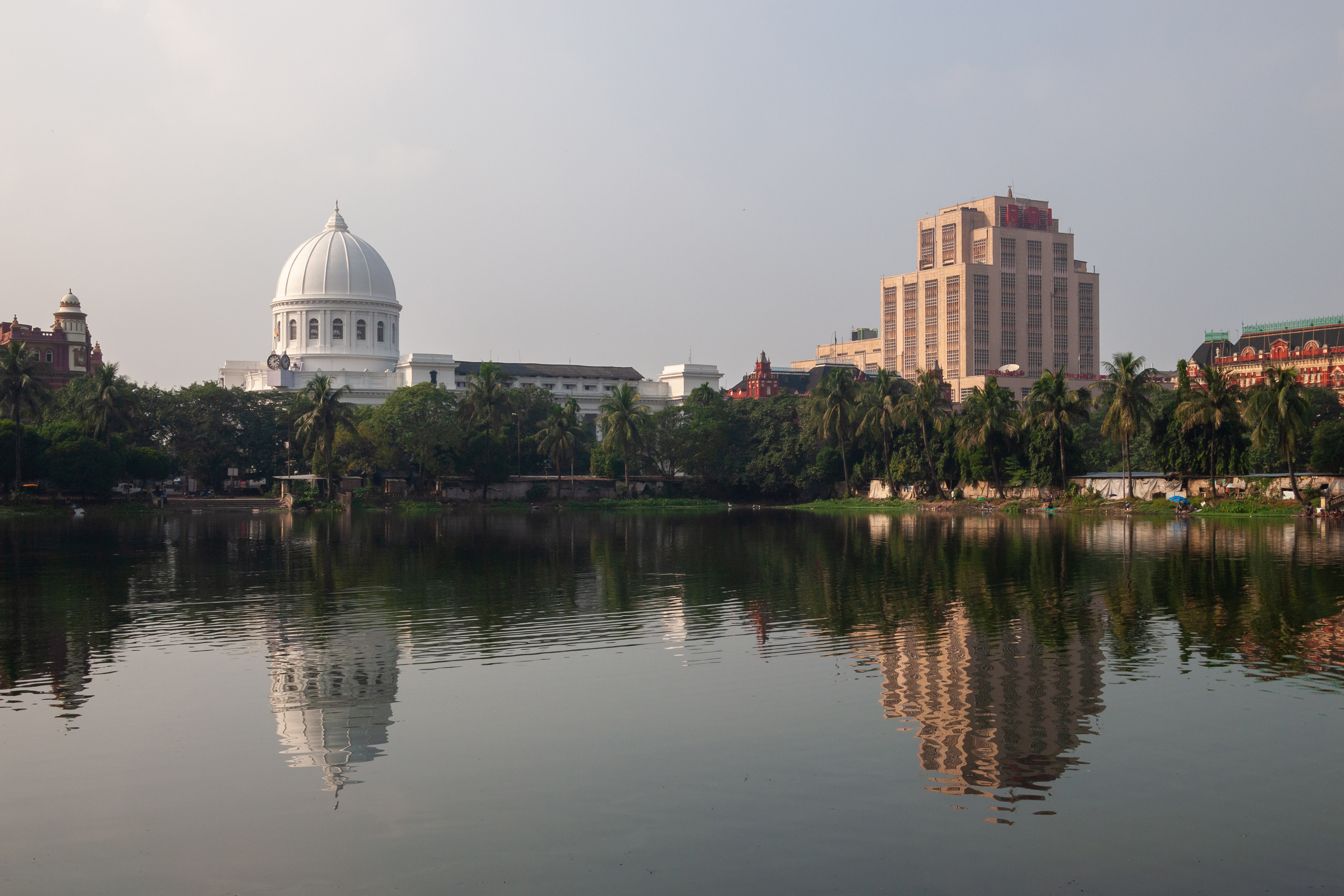
General Post Office and Reserve Bank of India building on Netaji Subhas Road as seen from across Lal Dighi
