= Lord Castlereagh (1802 EIC ship) =

British East India Company
- Name: Lord Castlereagh
- Namesake: Robert Stewart, Viscount Castlereagh
- Owner: 1802:Henry Bonham; 1820:Ross & Co.
- Builder: Barnard, Deptford
- Launched: 11 December 1802
- Fate: Last listed in 1822

General characteristics
- Tons burthen: 812, or 81228/94, or 857 (bm)
- Length: Overall:145 ft 3 in (44.3 m); Keel:117 ft 10 in (35.9 m)
- Beam: 36 ft 0 in (11.0 m)
- Depth of hold: 14 ft 9 in (4.5 m)
- Complement: 1803:99; 1806:100
- Armament: 1803: 20 × 18-pounder guns; 1806: 20 × 18-pounder guns
- Notes: Three decks

Lord Castlereagh was launched on the Thames in 1802 as an East Indiaman She made seven voyages for the British East India Company (EIC) before she was sold in 1820. She then may have sailed one or twice to Bombay under license from the EIC. Her subsequent disposition is currently obscure.

== Career ==
EIC voyage #1 (1803–1805): He sailed from Portsmouth on 27 April 1803, bound for Madras and Bengal. Lord Castlereagh was at Rio de Janeiro on 29 June. That day Robertson also acquired a letter of marque. Lord Castlereagh reached Madras on 11 September and Masulipatam on 30 September, and arrived at Diamond Harbour on 14 October. She was at Saugor on 17 February 1804, and visited Benkulen on 17 May before returning to Bengal, arriving at Kedgeree on 25 September. She was at Saugor on 13 October, and Calcutta on 15 December. Homeward bound, she was at Saugor on 30 January 1805, reached Madras on 12 February, and arrived at her moorings on 9 November.

EIC voyage #2 (1806–1807): Captain Christopher Kymer acquired a letter of marque on 8 February 1806. He sailed from Portsmouth on 4 March, bound for Madras and Bengal. Lord Castlereagh reached Madras on 27 June and arrived at Diamond Harbour on 10 July. She then was at Saugor on 5 September, visited Penang on 17 October, and was back at Kedgeree on 13 December. Homeward bound, she was at Madras on 15 February 1807, Colombo on 20 March, and St Helena on 16 June. She arrived at The Downs on 6 September. On 27 February Kymer had written to complain that his surgeon had died and that when the British Royal Navy had impressed his surgeon's mate he no longer had any medical personnel on board.

EIC voyage #3 (1808–1810): Captain Kymer sailed from Portsmouth on 15 April 1808, bound for St Helena and Bengal. Lord Castlereagh reached St Helena on 4 July, the Cape of Good Hope on 15 September, and Trincomalee on 11 December. She was at Diamond Harbour on 2 February 1809 and Saugor on 8 March.

In March, Kymer joined Captain Hemming of Earl Spencer and Captain Hawes of Monarch in letters of protest against the Royal Navy's having impressed seamen from Indiamen. Lord Castlereagh had lost a total of 31 men.

Lord Castlereagh visited Benkulen on 20 May and Penang on 20 July, before returning to Diamond Harbour on 25 September. Homeward bound, she was at Saugor on 29 October, reached St Helena on 3 May 1810, and arrived at her moorings on 9 July.

EIC voyage #4 (1811–1813): Captain Kymer sailed from Torbay on 30 May 1811, bound for Bengal and China. Lord Castlereagh reached Madeira on 21 June and arrived at Kedgeree on 18 November. She was at Saugor on 5 December, Penang on 4 May, and Malacca on 9 June. She arrived at Whampoa anchorage on 29 June. Homeward bound, she crossed the Second Bar on 27 August, returned to Malacca on 18 October, and reached Saugor on 5 December. She stopped at Acheh on 26 April 1813, reached St Helena on 10 August, and arrived at The Downs on 7 November.

EIC voyage #5 (1815–1816): Captain Kymer sailed from The Downs on 22 May 1815, bound for Bengal. Lord Castlereagh arrived at Diamond Harbour on 24 September. Homeward bound, she was at Saugor on 20 January 1816, reached St Helena on 16 June, and arrived at The Downs on 13 August.

EIC voyage #6 (1817–1818): Captain William Younghusband sailed from The Downs on 23 April 1817, bound for Bengal. Lord Castlereagh was at Simon's Bay on 5 July, and reached Diamond Harbour on 1 September. She arrived at the New Anchorage on 18 December. Homeward bound, she was at Saugor on 21 February 1818, and the Cape on 6 May. She reached St Helena on 26 May, and arrived at the Downs on 31 July.

EIC voyage #7 (1819–1820): Captain Younghusband sailed from The Downs on 22 April 1819. Lord Castlereagh arrived at Whampoa on 5 September. Homeward bound, she crossed the Second Bar on 19 November, reached St Helena on 13 February 1820, and arrived at The Downs on 9 April.

On one of these two voyages Captain Younghusband suffered some disciplinary problems. On the outward bound leg of the voyage he disciplined some seamen for having abused the steward over the food served at a meal rather than having complained to the captain. Next day the bosun reported that a number of ropes had been cut in such a way that it could have endangered the rigging and the ship. On the homeward leg, prior to reaching St Helena, Younghusband had 11 seamen punished for attempting to prevent the flogging of one of their number. Younghusband left the ringleader at St Helena to return aboard HMS Conqueror. When the man arrived back in England he sued Younghusband. Younghusband won the case, but legal fees cost him £165.

== Fate ==
In 1820 Lord Castlereagh was sold to Ross & Co., London. One report has Ross & Co. renaming her Lord Cathcart. However, it appears that there is some conflation between this Lord Castlrereagh and another Lord Castlereagh (both of almost the same size and both trading with India), and confusion of records (Lord Cathcart appearing in the Registers just after Lord Castlereagh).

There was a Lord Cathcart that was listed among the ships sailing to India in 1820 under license from the EIC, but she was half the size of Lord Castlereagh. Her owner was different and that voyage never took place as she was wrecked in the Mediterranean in 1820.

Year	Master	Owner	Trade	Burthen	Launched	Source
1820	M. Laing	Bruce & Co.	London–India	786	India	Lloyd's Register (LR)
1820	M.Laing	Ross & Co.	London–Bombay	812	River	Register of Shipping (RS)
1821	C.Kymer	Wordsworth	London–India	812	River	LR
1821	M.Laing	Bruce & Co.	London–India	786	India	LR
1821	M.Laing	Ross & Co.	London–Bombay	812	River	RS

For both Registers, the last listing for the Lord Castlereagh launched on the Thames in 1802 was in 1822.
