= Metcalfe Hall =

Building in Kolkata, India

Coordinates: 22°34′17.5″N 88°20′41″E

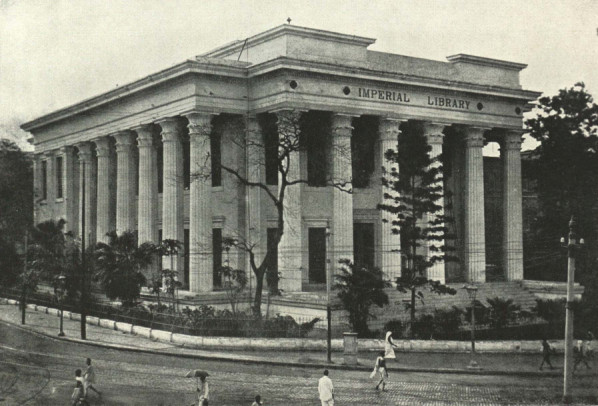
- Metcalfe Hall in 1905
- Interactive map of the Metcalfe Hall area
- Etymology: Sir Charles T. Metcalfe

General information
- Architectural style: neoclassical, Greek revival
- Location: Kolkata, West Bengal, India
- Completed: 1844

Metcalfe Hall is a heritage building situated in Kolkata, India, at the junction of Strand Road and Hare Street in the heart of the city's business district. The architecture is reflective of the British imperial architecture at the middle of the nineteenth century, and visually similar to ancient Greek temples. It was built between 1840 and 1844 according to the design prepared by the city magistrate, C.K. Robinson and named after Sir Charles T. Metcalfe, the Governor-General of India, in honour of his efforts towards a free press. The building faces the Hooghly River on the West.

== History ==
Initially, the building housed the Calcutta Public Library collection, formed by Lord Metcalf, then the Governor General, who transferred 4,675 volumes from the library of the College of Fort William. These volumes and donations of books from individuals formed the nucleus of the library, which was created under private auspices. Dwarkanath Tagore was the first proprietor of Calcutta Public Library. Presently, the ground floor houses the Asiatic Society's rare foreign journals and manuscripts section, while the first floor houses offices, exhibition galleries and a sales counter of the Archaeological Survey of India.

== Architecture ==
The main entrance from the West comprising a giant flight of stairs has been closed. The building is now accessed through the portico on the East, from the portico on the 'Hare Street'. The building is raised on a solid basement and thirty huge Corinthian pillars support a massive entablature. The columns and colonnade surround the whole building. Internally there are two stories comprising five halls.

== Gallery ==
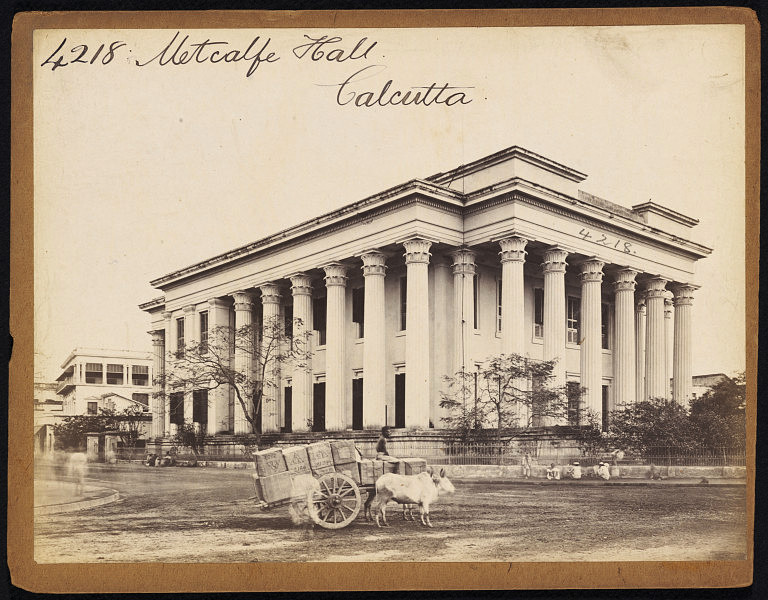
Metcalfe Hall in 19th century

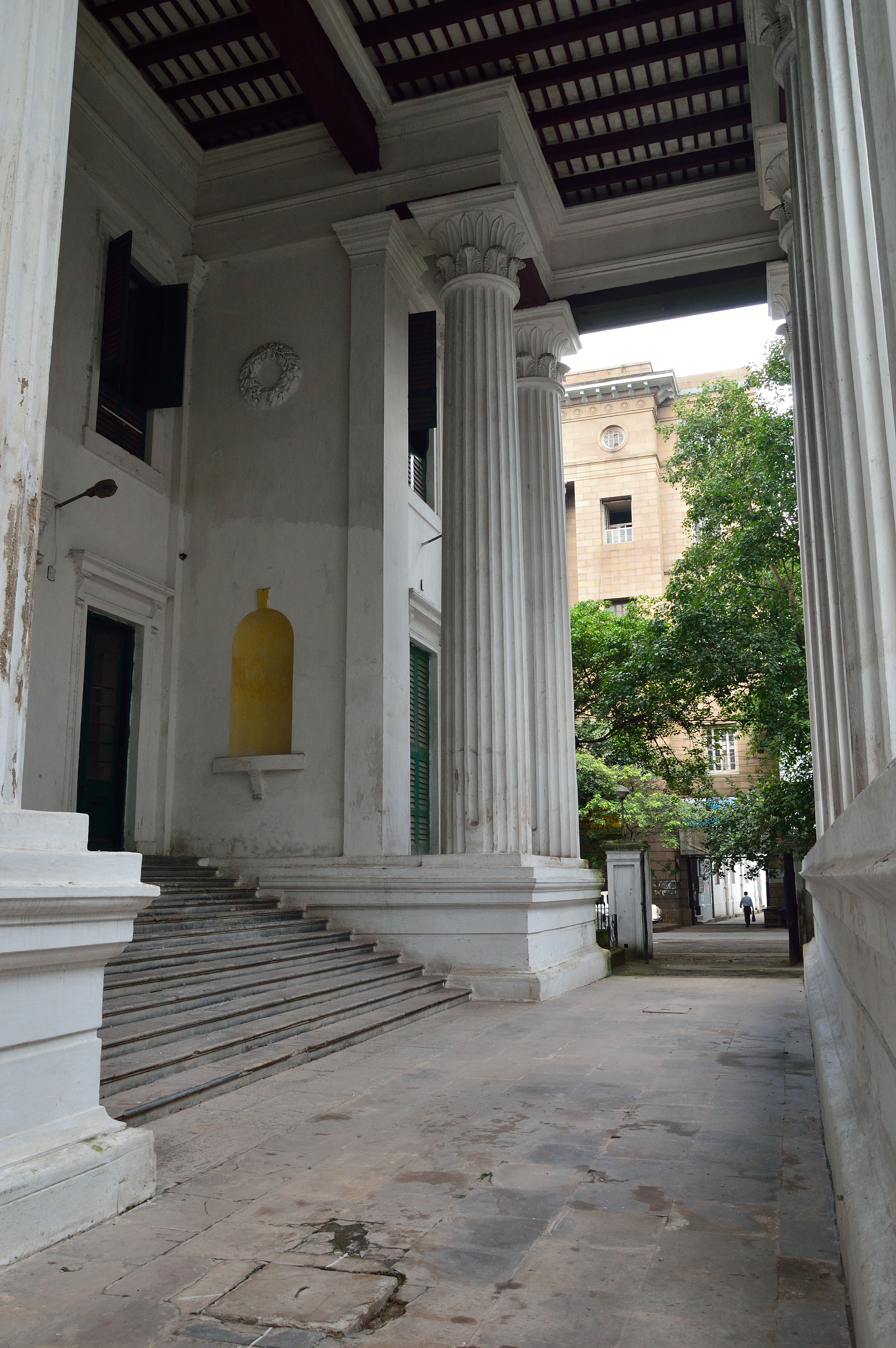
Entrance

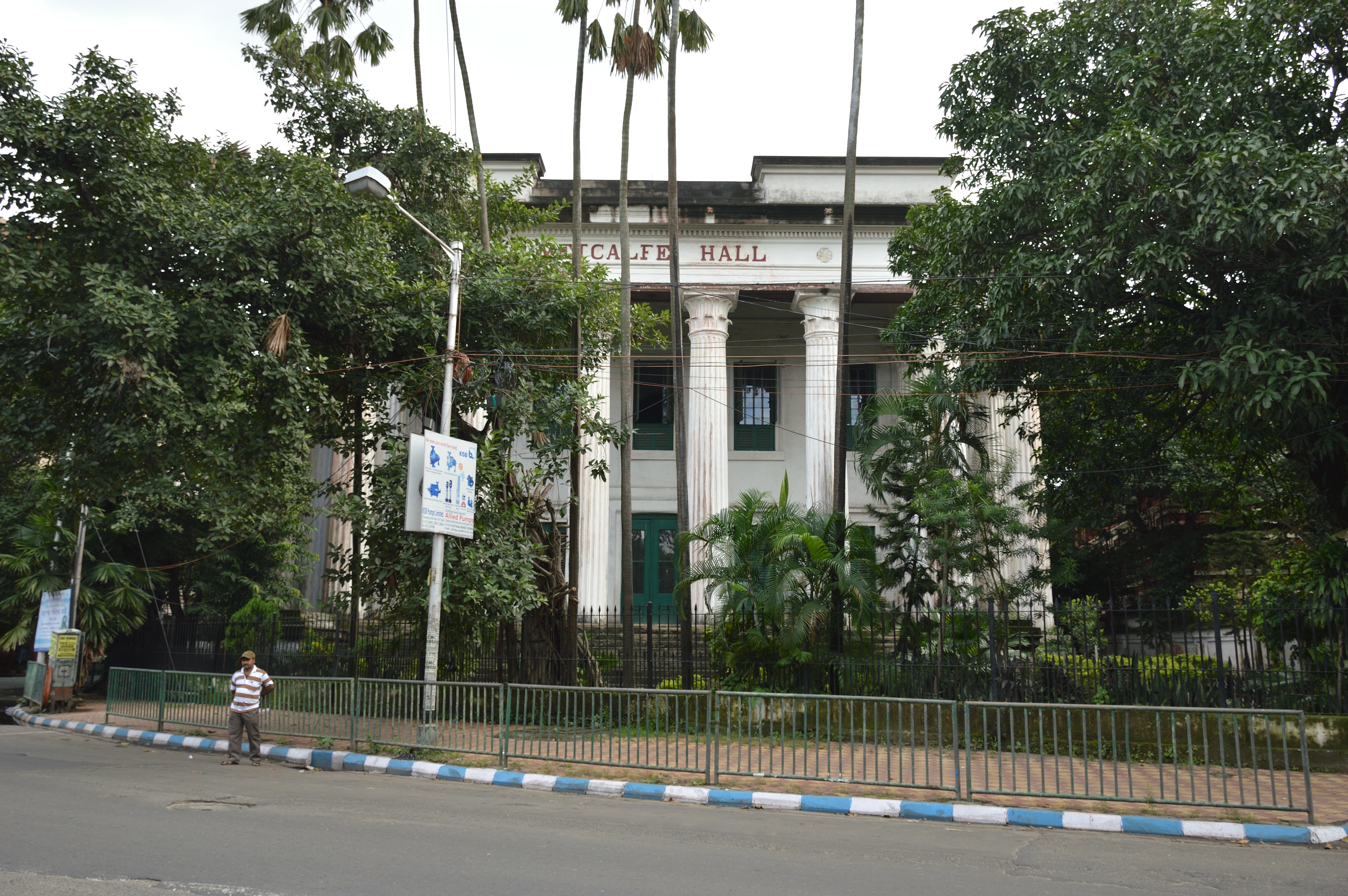
Metcalfe Hall, Strand Road view

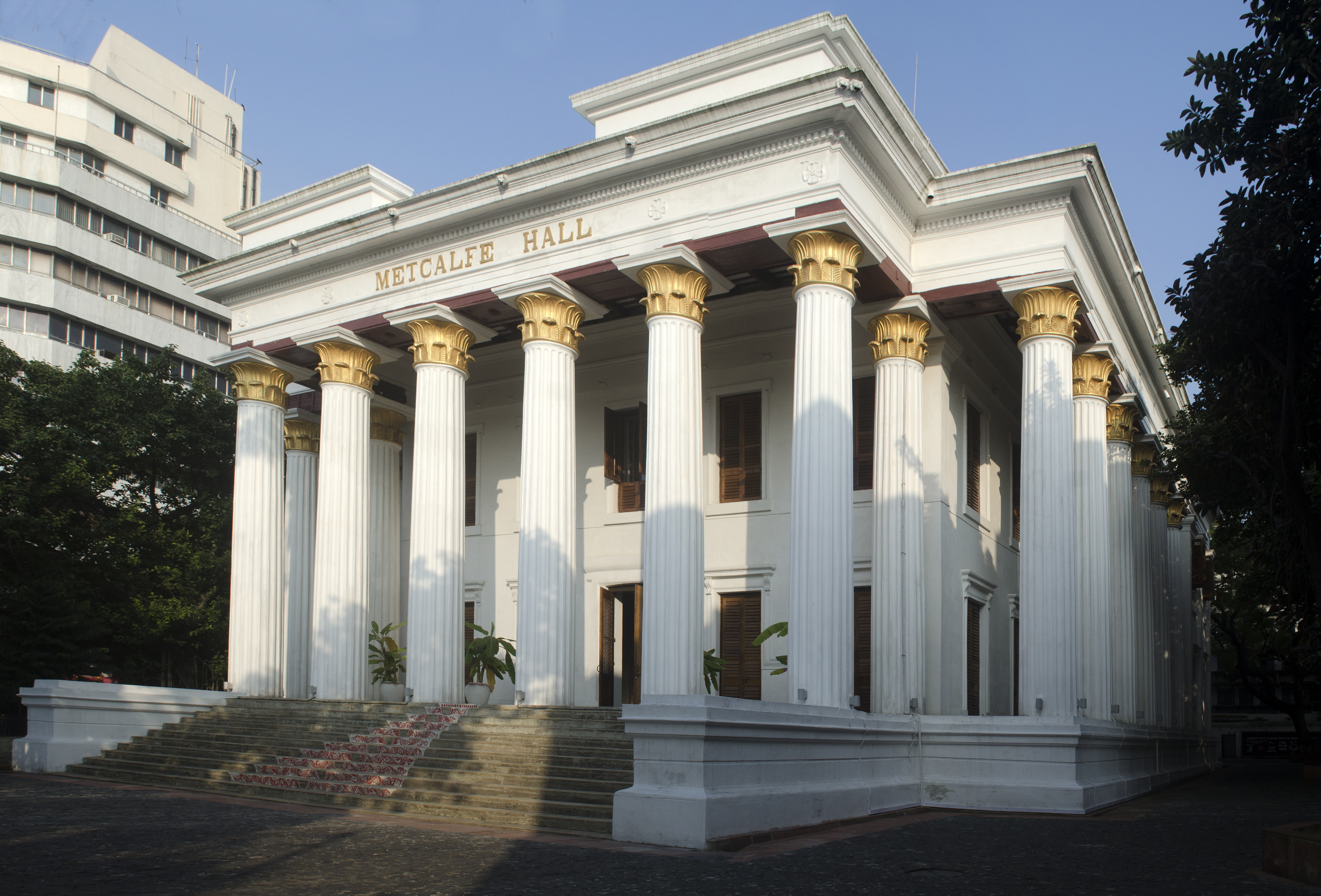
Metclafe Hall

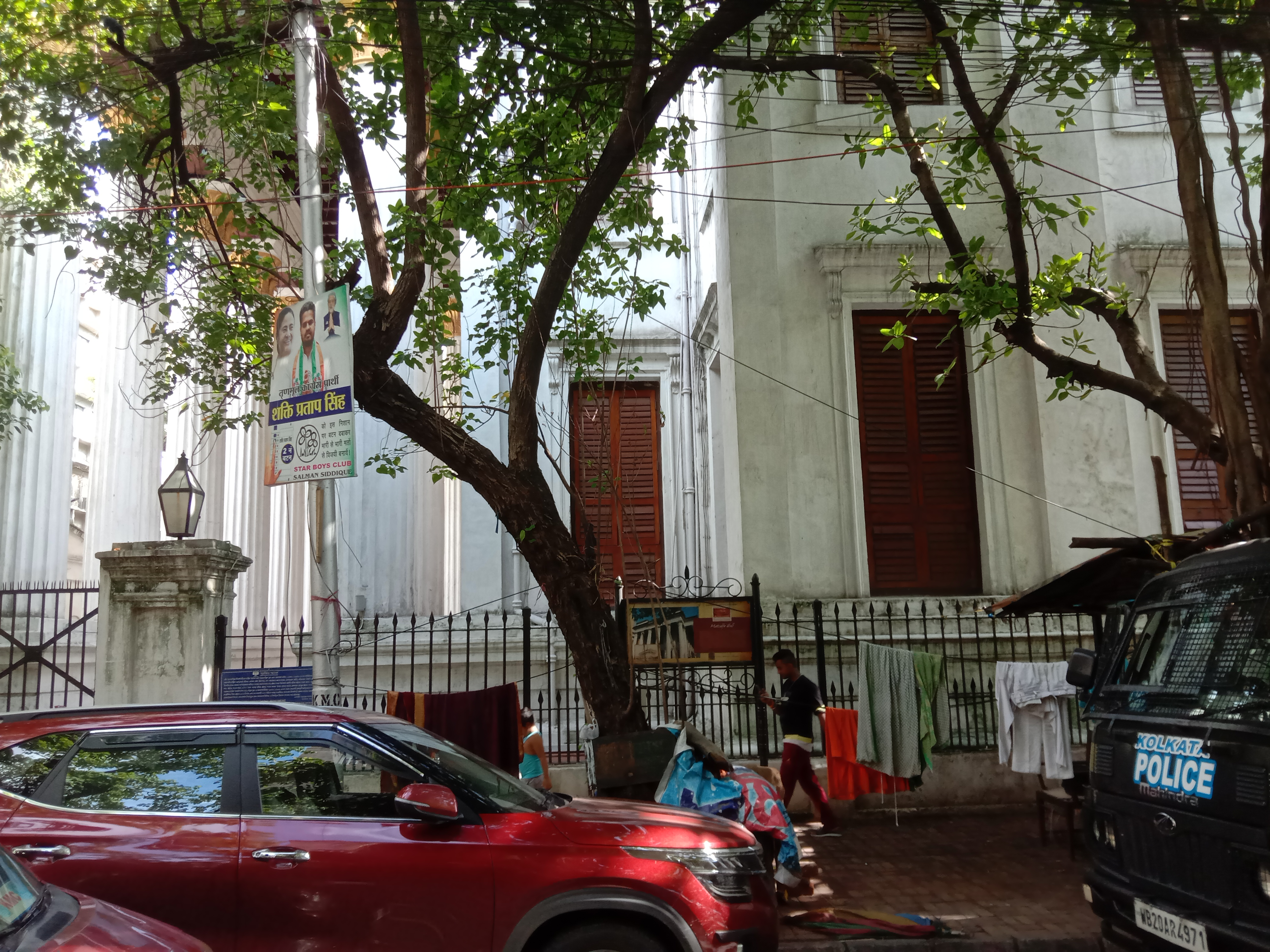
Metcalfe Hall, as seen from Hare Street.
