= Strand Road, Kolkata =

Road in Kolkata, India

Strand Road
- The Strand
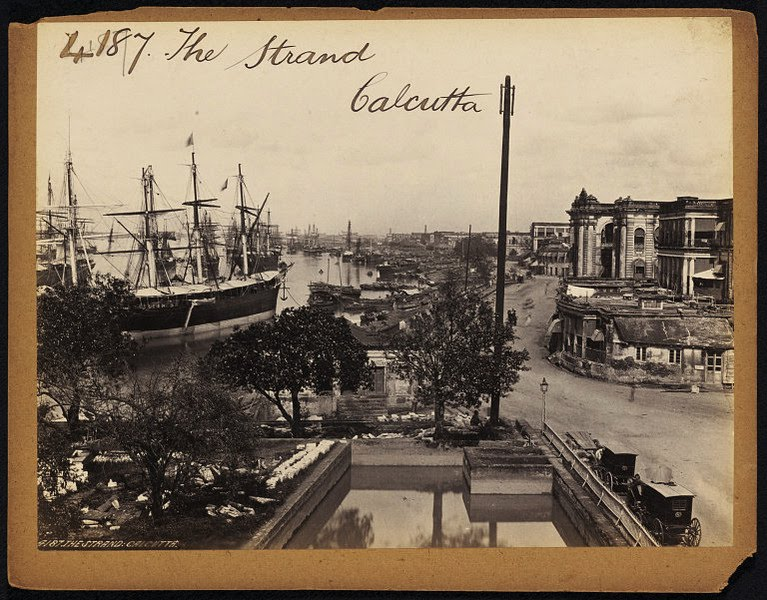
- Strand Road in mid 19th century
- Maintained by: Kolkata Municipal Corporation
- Location: Kolkata, India
- Postal code: 700001, 700003, 700005, 700006, 700007, 700021, 700022, 700023
- North end: Baghbazar
- South end: Watgunge

Other
- Known for: Runs along the east bank of the Hooghly River

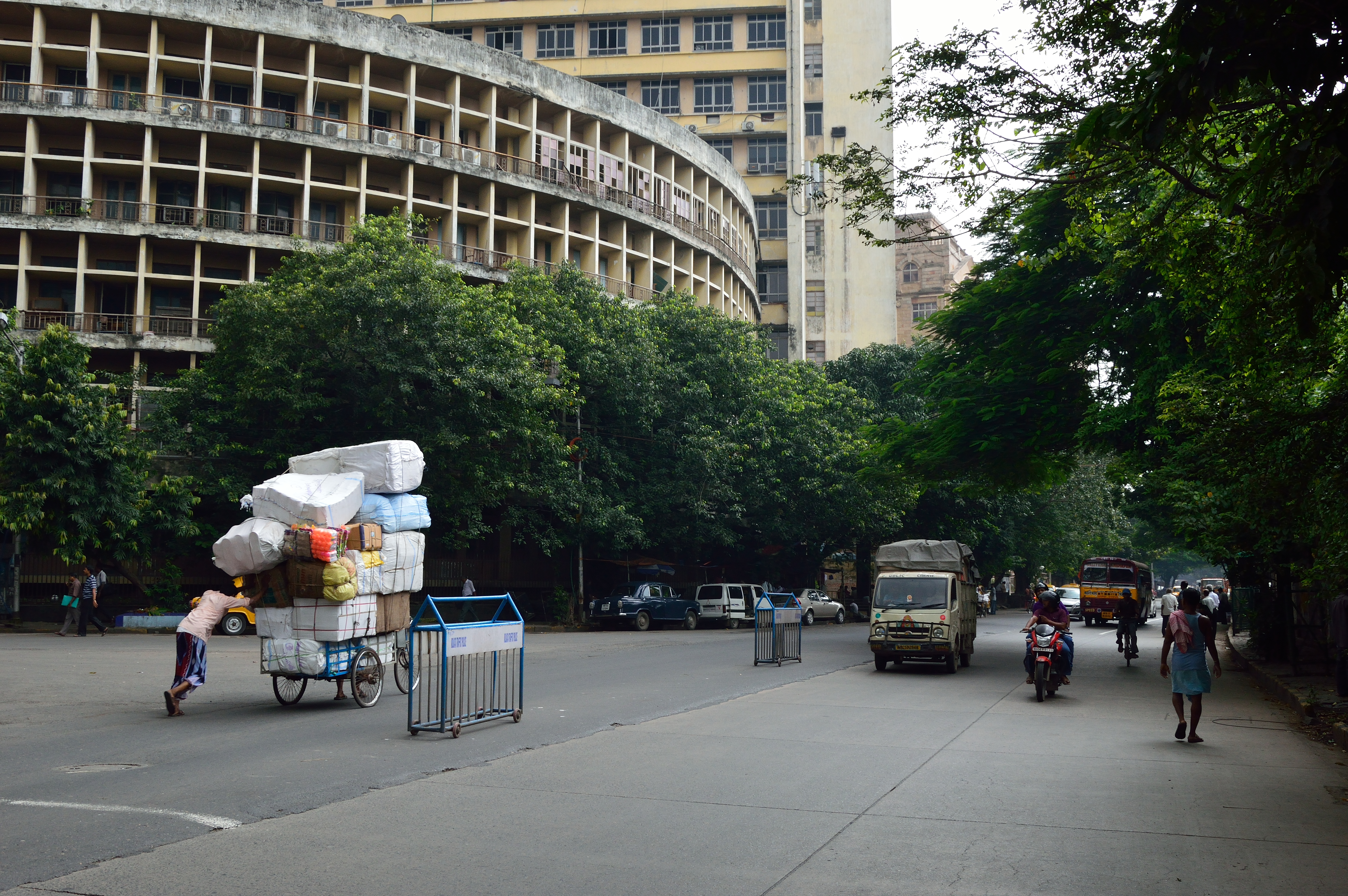
Strand Road, Kolkata

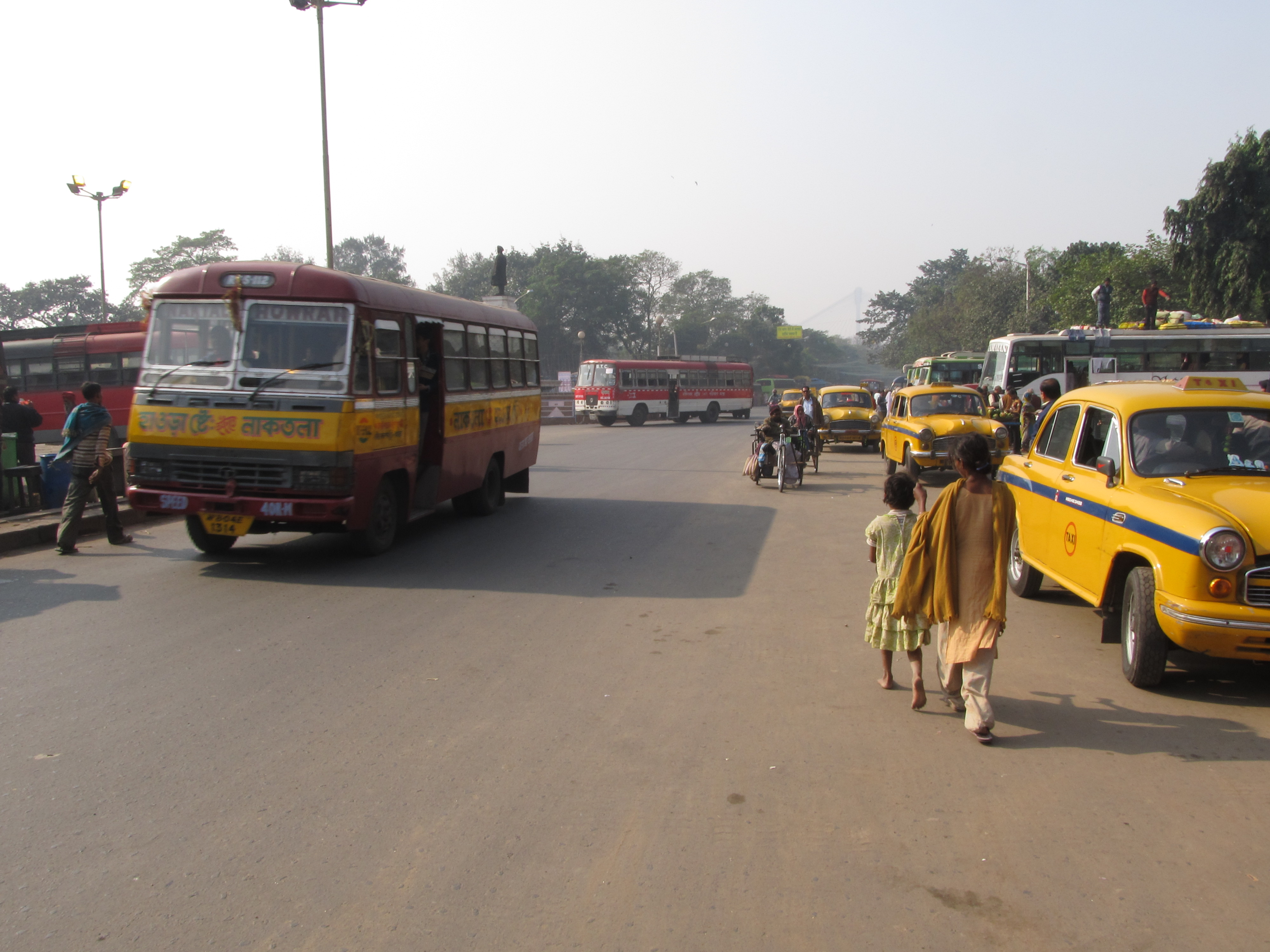
Strand road near Outram Ghat

Strand Road, also referred to as The Strand, is a major thoroughfare in downtown Kolkata, India. Running along the east bank of the Hooghly River, the road connects Baghbazar to Watgunge (in the Kidderpore neighbourhood) via the threshold of Howrah Bridge. South of Princep Ghat, Strand Road becomes St. Georges Gate Road. This road runs through the Kolkata Municipal Corporation Ward Nos. 7, 8, 9, 18, 19, 20, 21, 22, 23, 24, 41, 42, 45, 46, 75 and 76. The Legislative Assembly constituencies adjacent to this road are Shyampukur, Jorasanko, Chowringhee and Kolkata Port and the Lok Sabha constituencies are Kolkata Uttar and Kolkata Dakshin.

== History ==
Strand Road was completed in 1828, undertaken by the Lottery Committee, along what was previously a long sedge bank. According to the historian H.E.A. Cotton, the road ran from Prinsep Ghat to Hatkhola Ghat. The area around Prinsep Ghat had a large portion of riverbank reclaimed and thrown into the roadway.

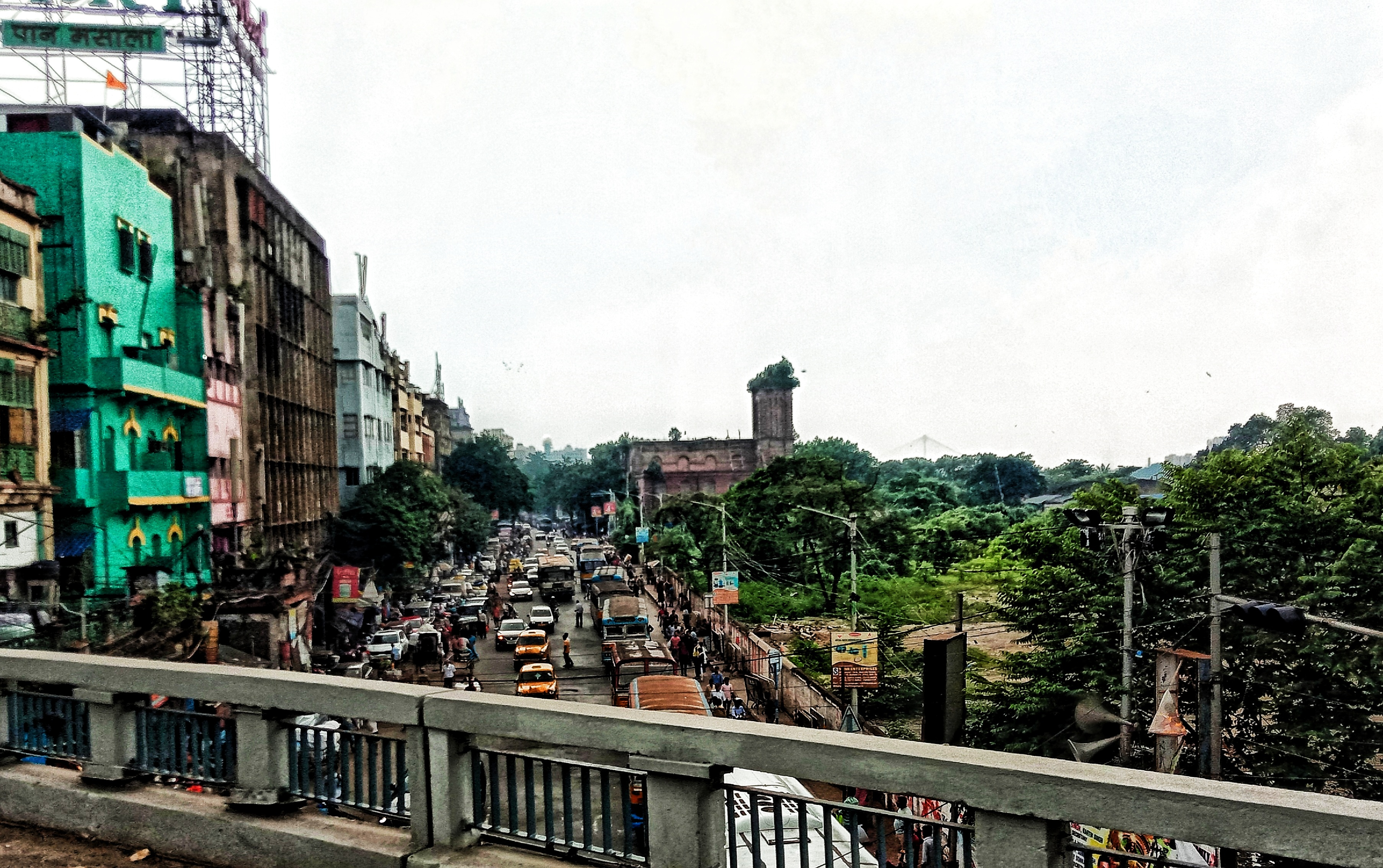
Traffic in Strand Road, as seen from Brabourne Road Flyover, 2022.

Erected in 1838, Baboo Ghat is a significant monument in Doric Greek style on Strand Road. It was commissioned by Baboo Raj Chundrer Das, husband of Rani Rashmoni, founder of Dakshineswar Kali Temple. Immediately west of the Kolkata High Court is Chandpal Ghat, named after Chunder Nath Pal, who owned a shop at the site for the ‘refreshment of pedestrians and boatmen’. The ghat dates from at least 1774 (predating Strand Road itself) and eventually became the point at which the colonial rulers and administrators of India would arrive and leave the city prior to the advent of rail travel.

Eden Gardens, the oldest cricket ground in India and largest in Asia, is located beside Strand Road, opposite to Babughat.

== Gallery ==
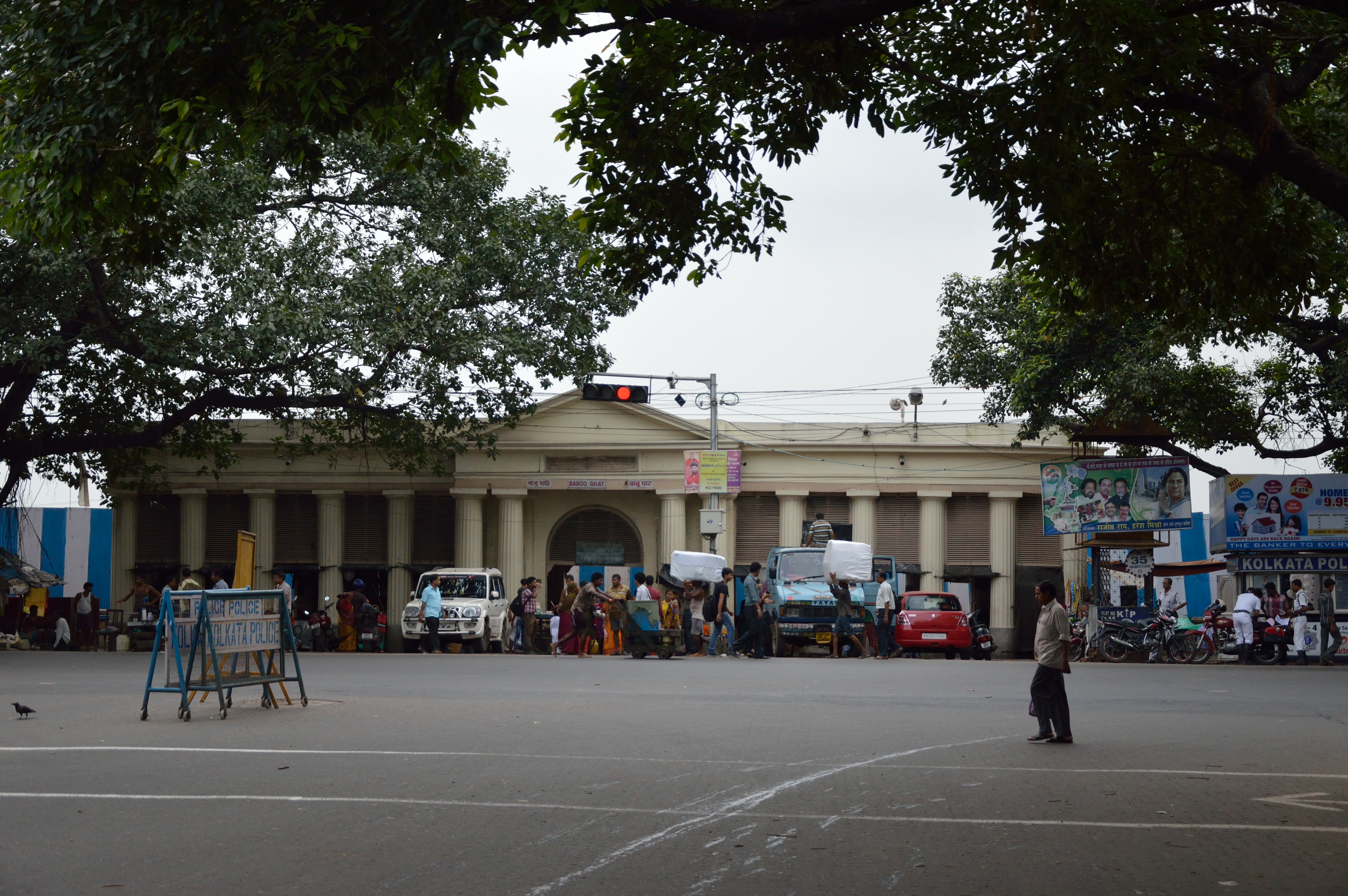
Babughat, Strand Road

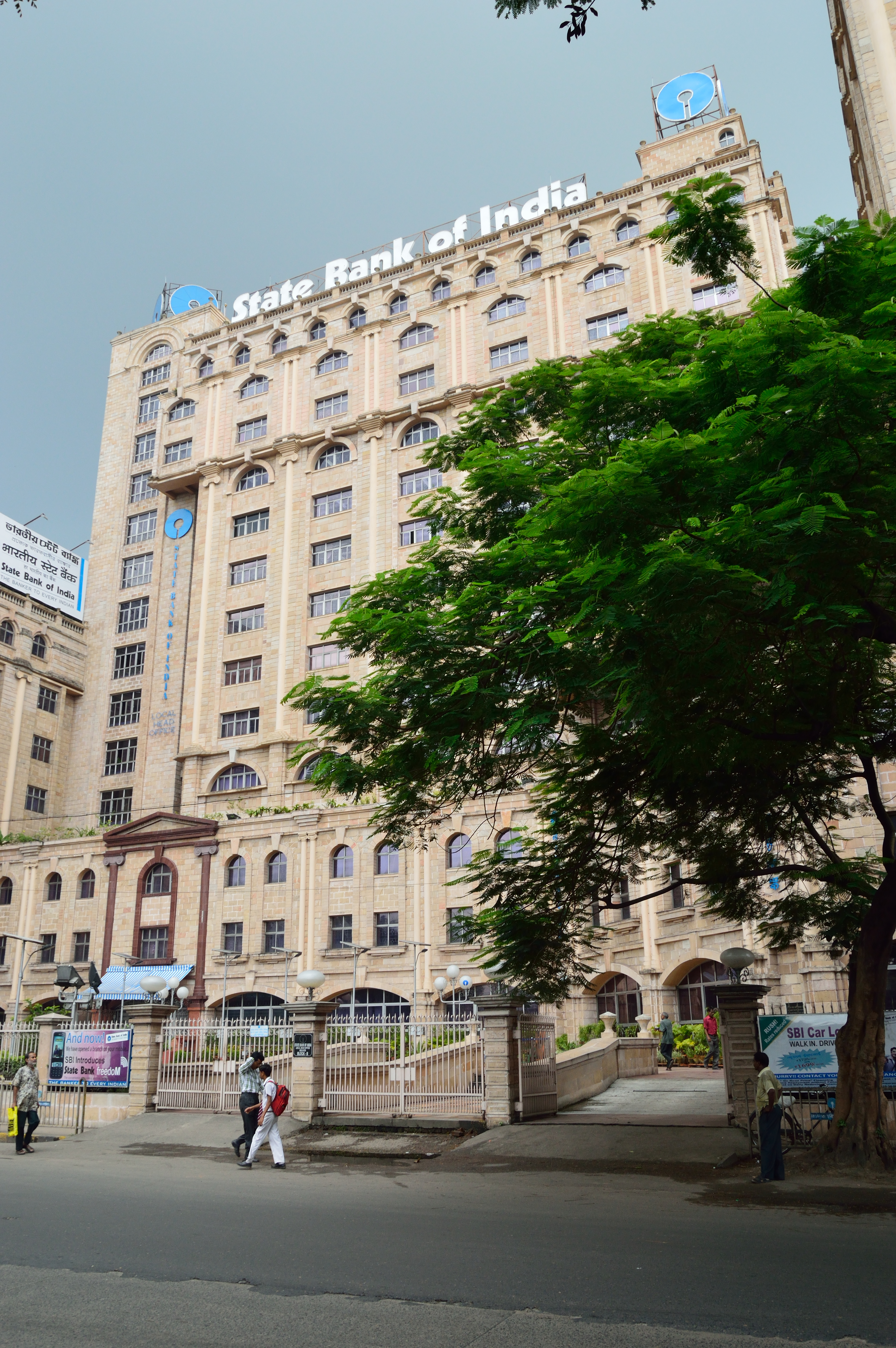
Samriddhi Bhavan, Strand Road

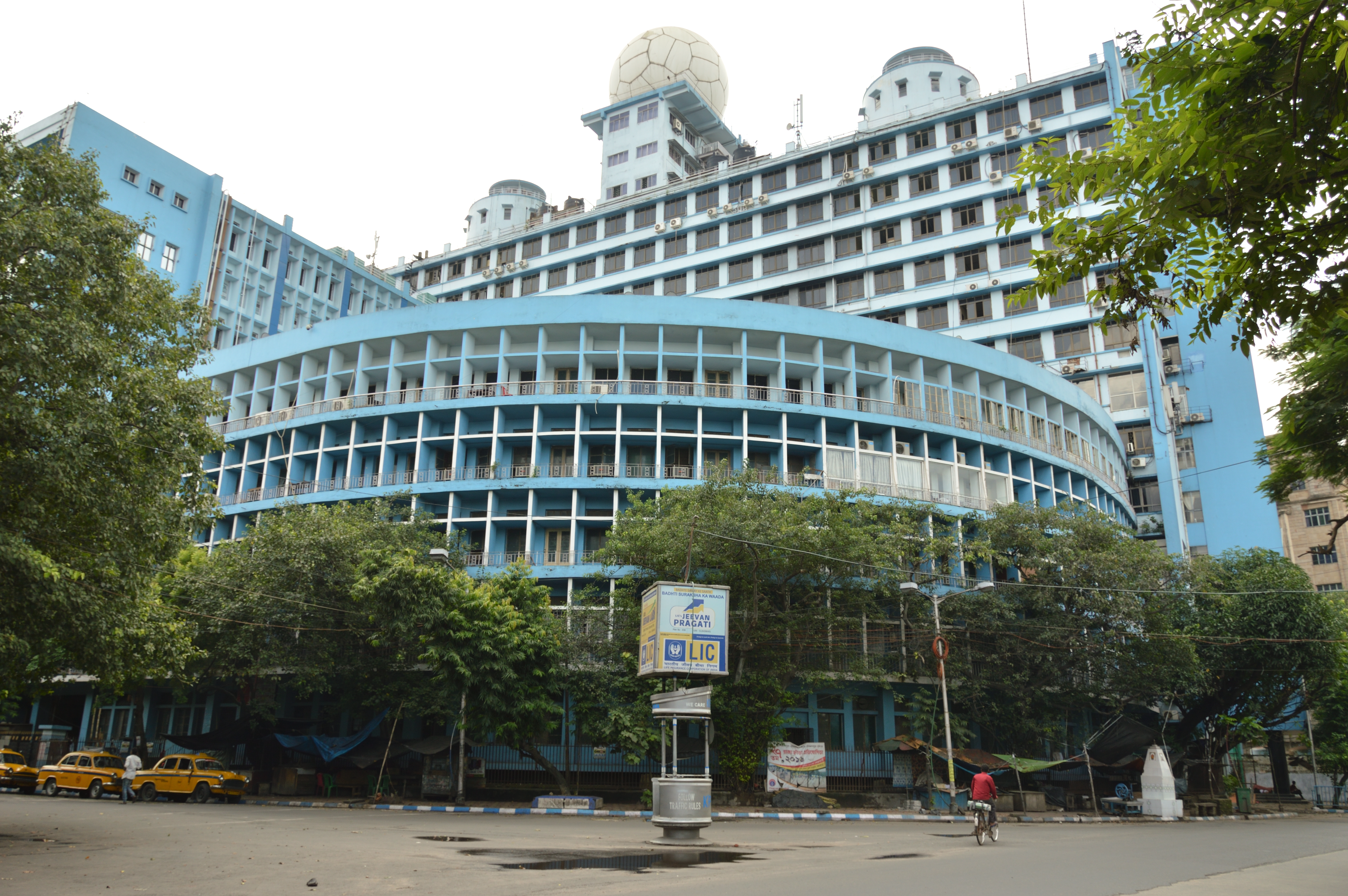
New Secretariat Building, Strand Road

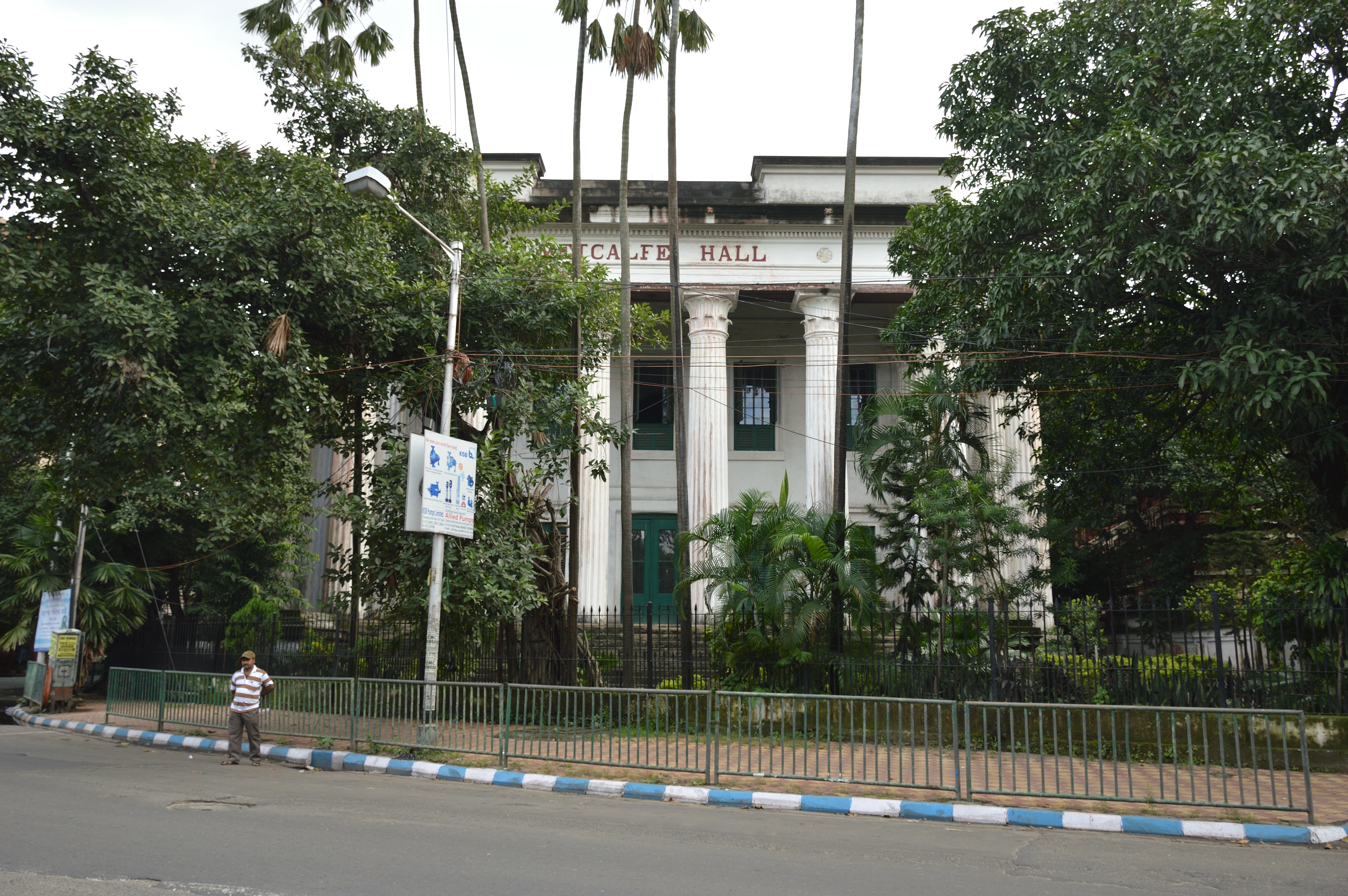
Metcalfe Hall, Strand Road

Jeevan Ganga Building (LIC), Strand Road

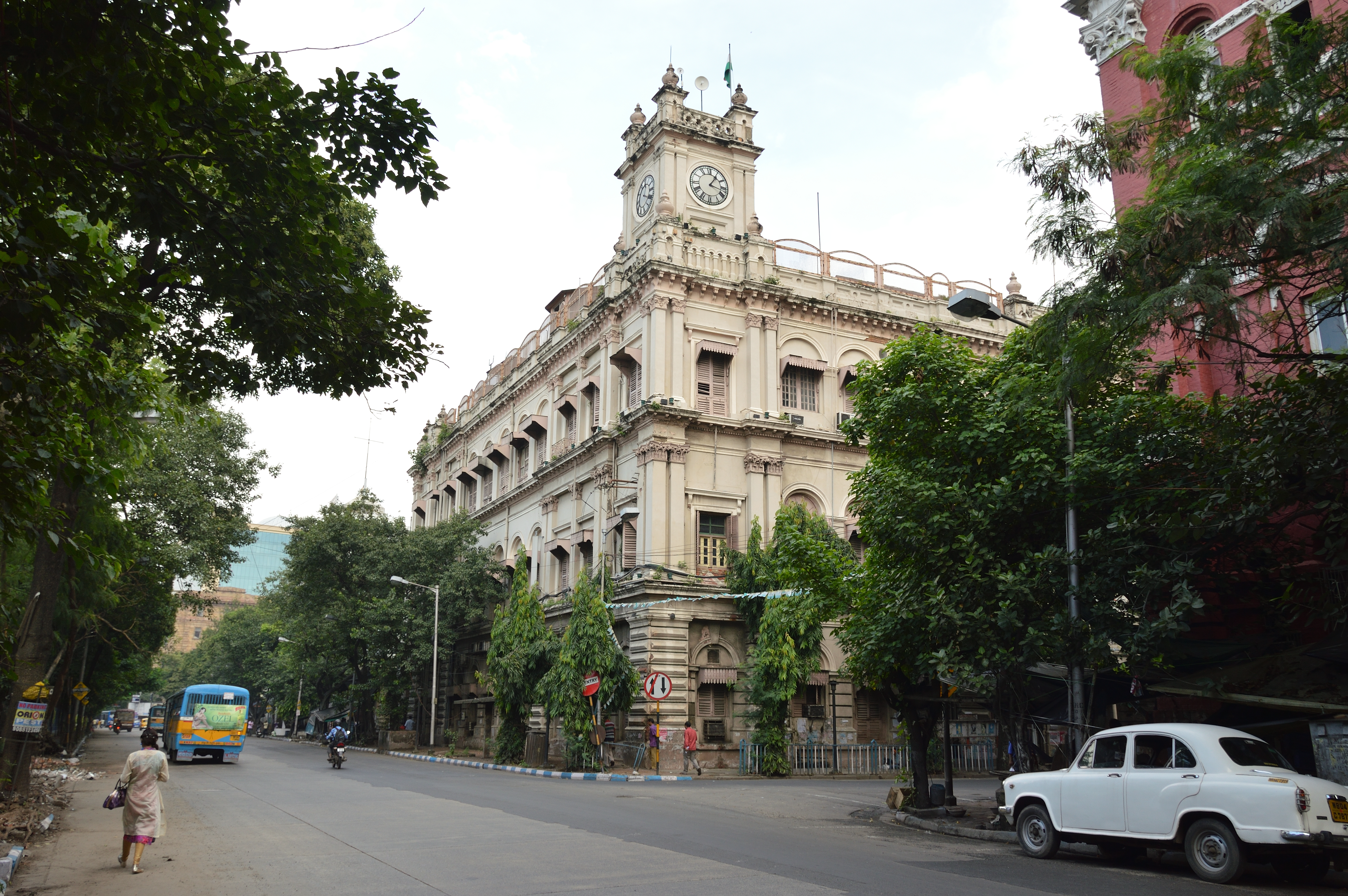
Kolkata Port Trust Building, Strand Road

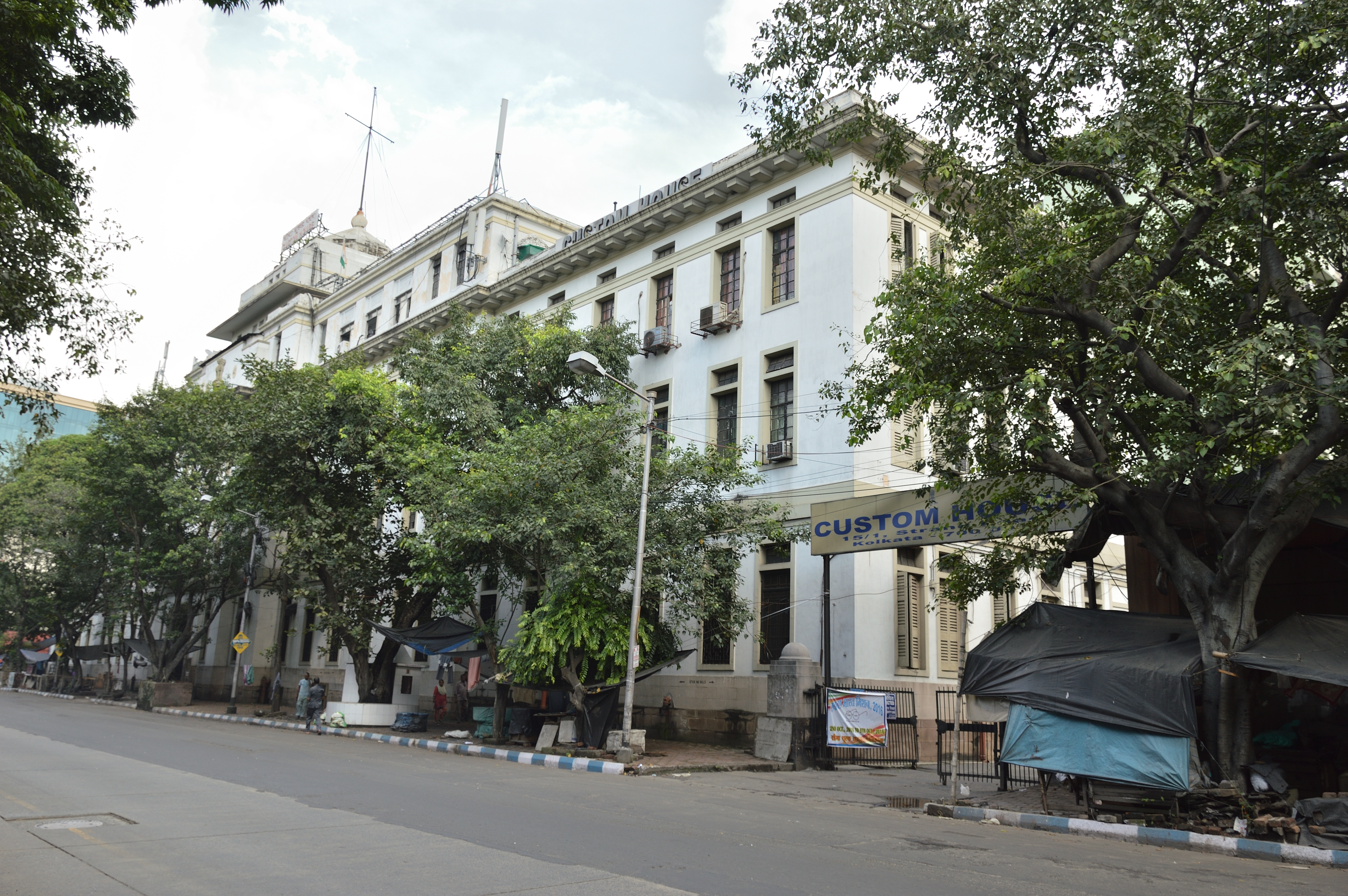
Custom House, Strand Road

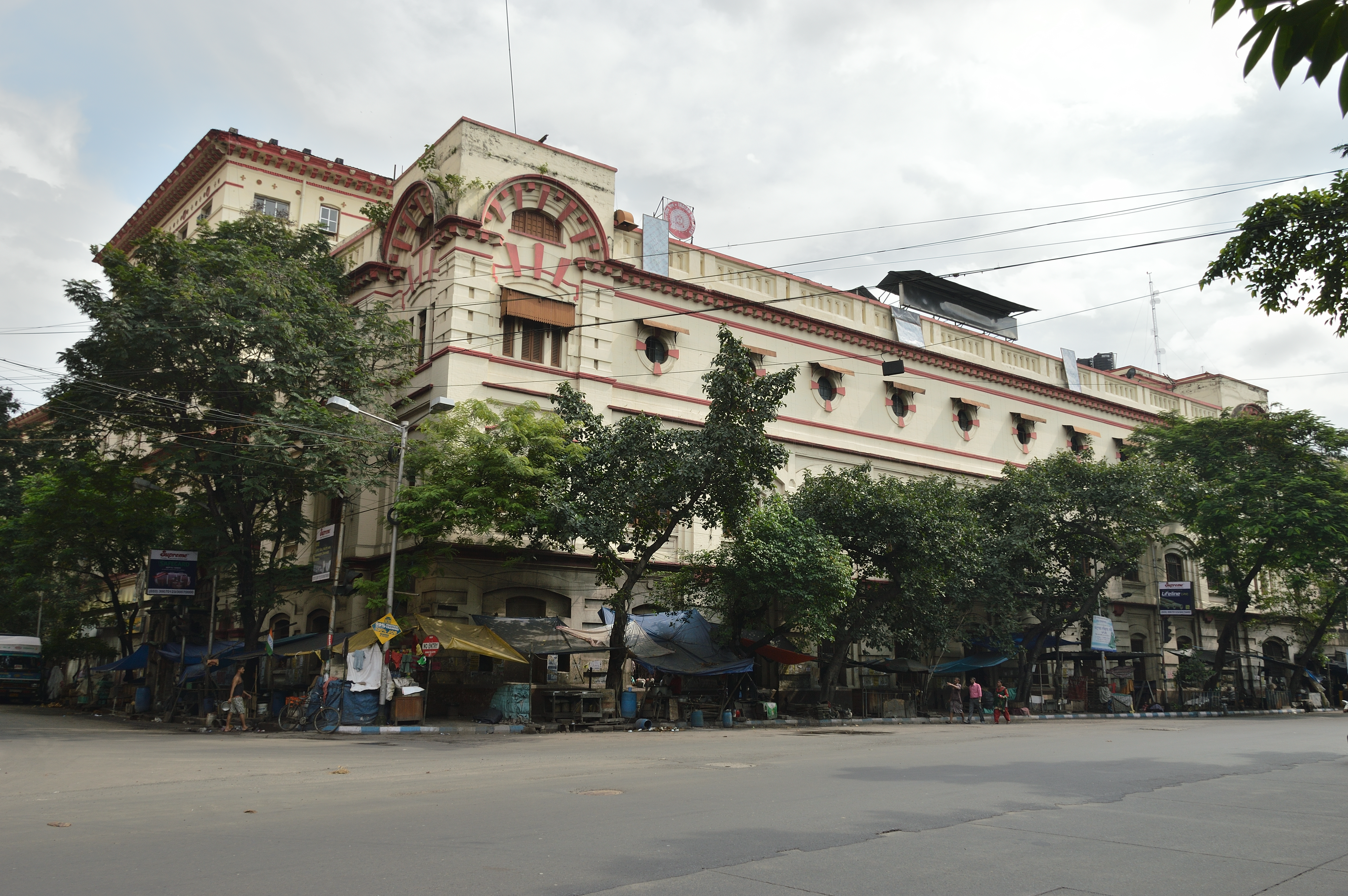
Eastern Railway Building, Strand Road

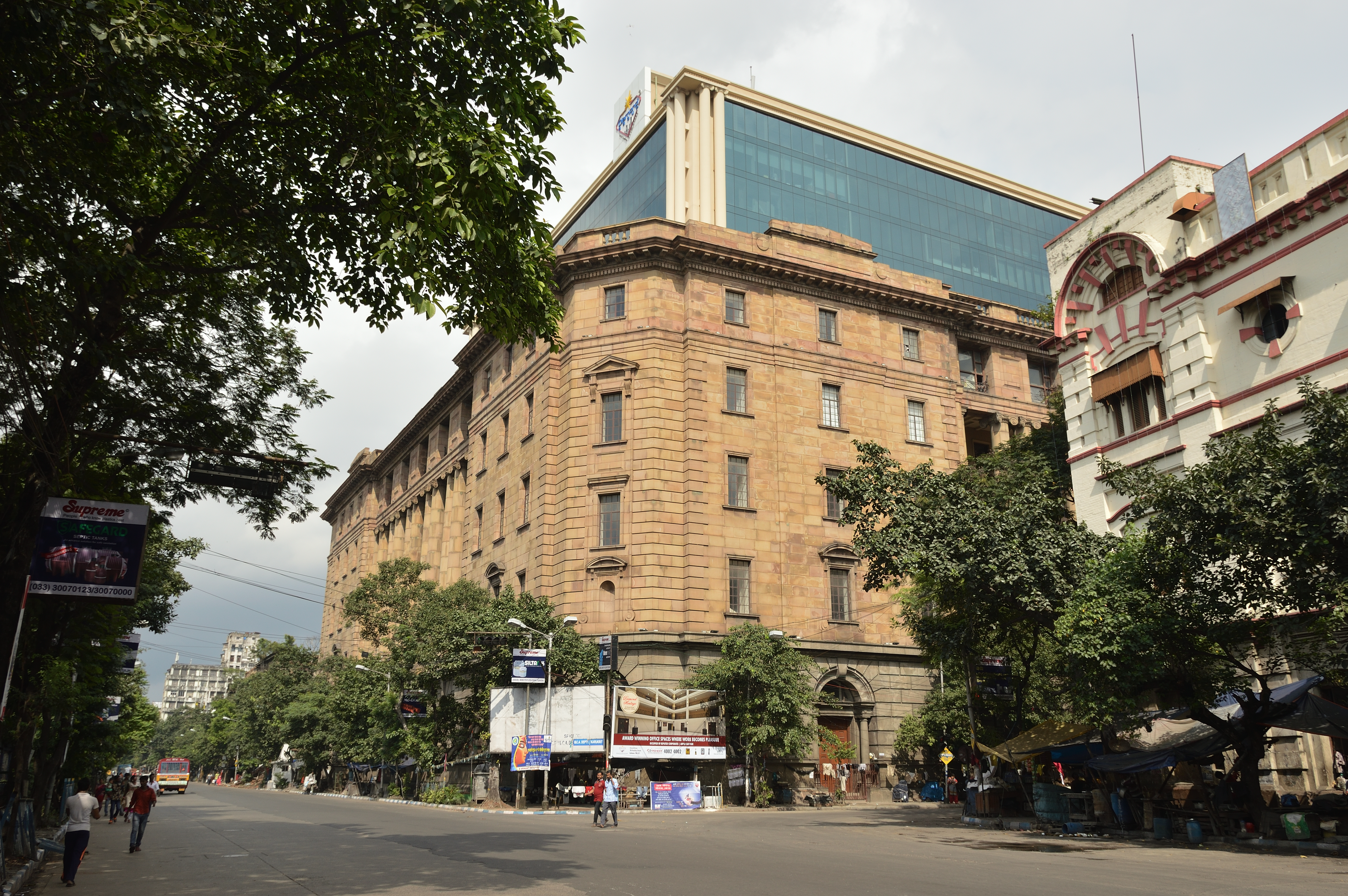
Diamond Heritage, Strand Road

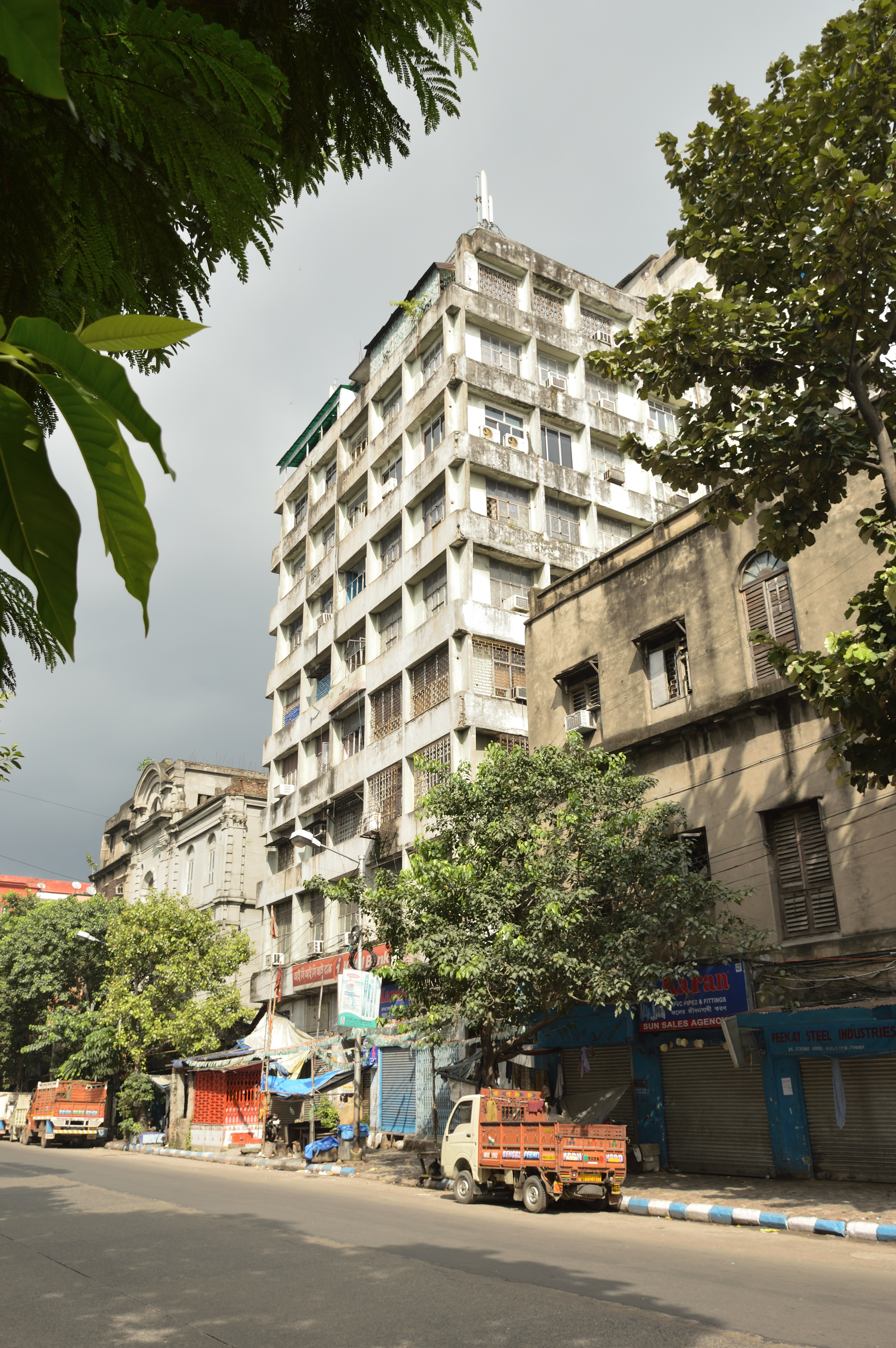
Mersall House, Strand Road

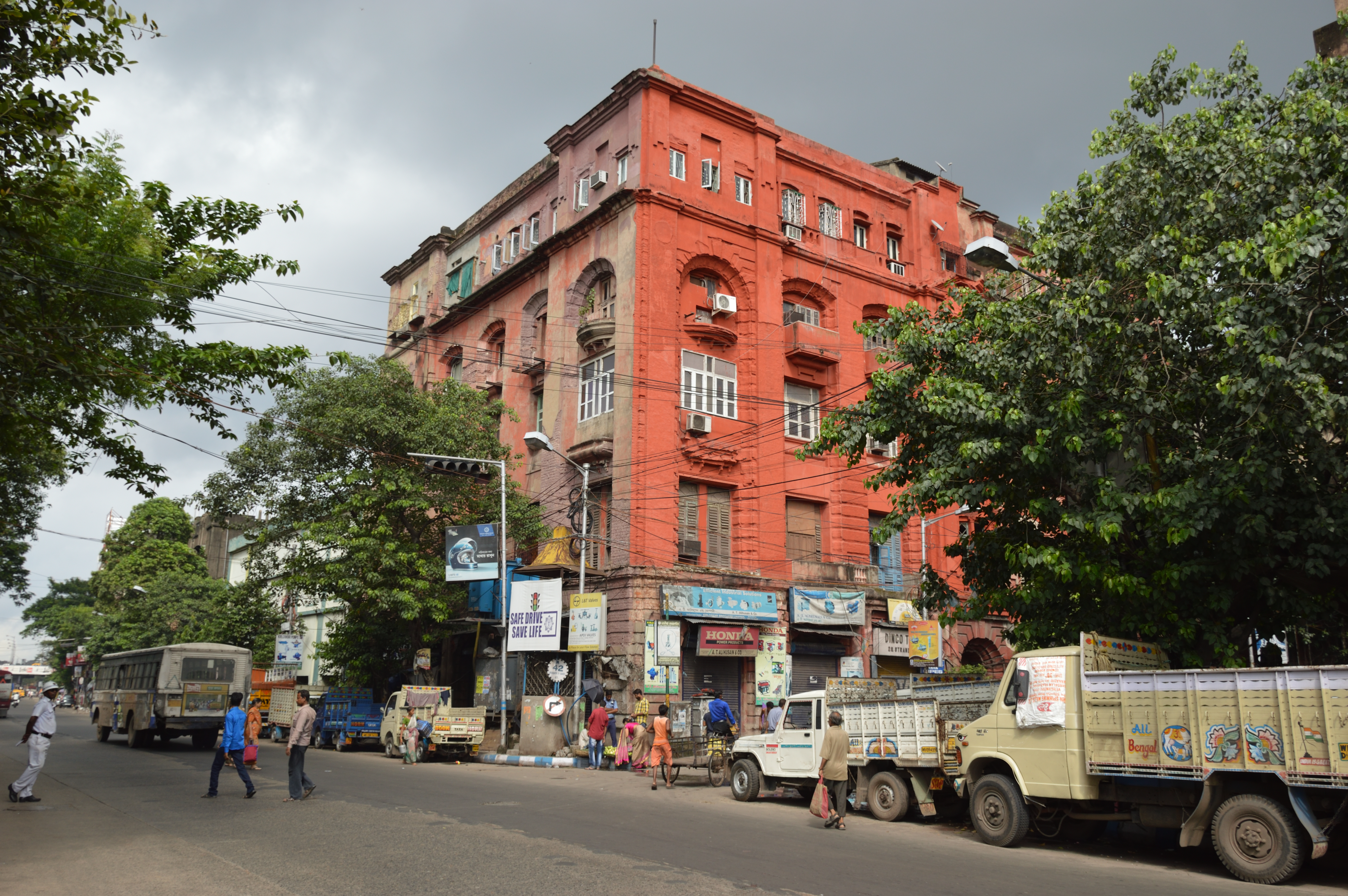
Mohta House, Strand Road

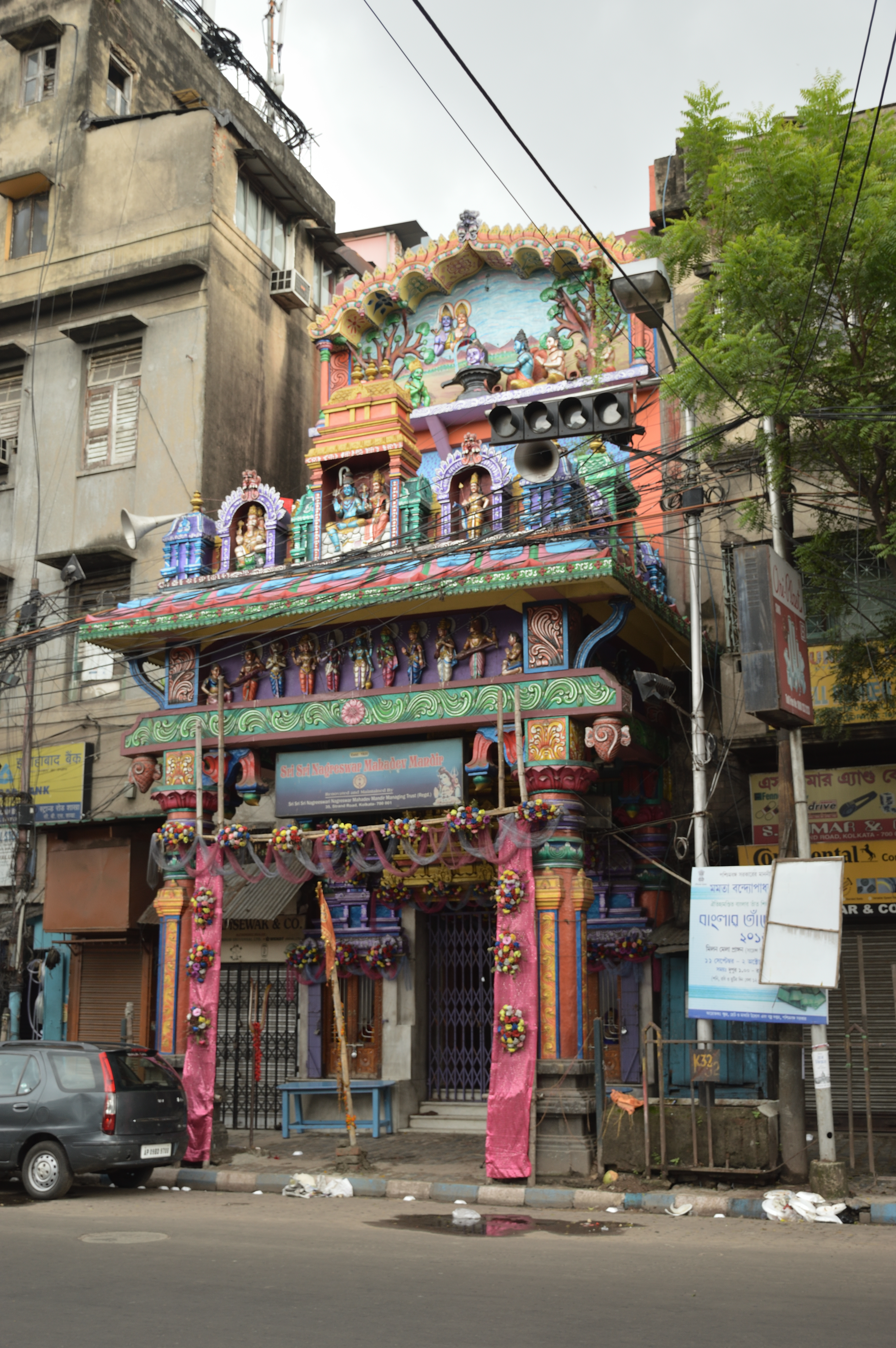
Nagreswar Mahadev Mandir, Strand Road

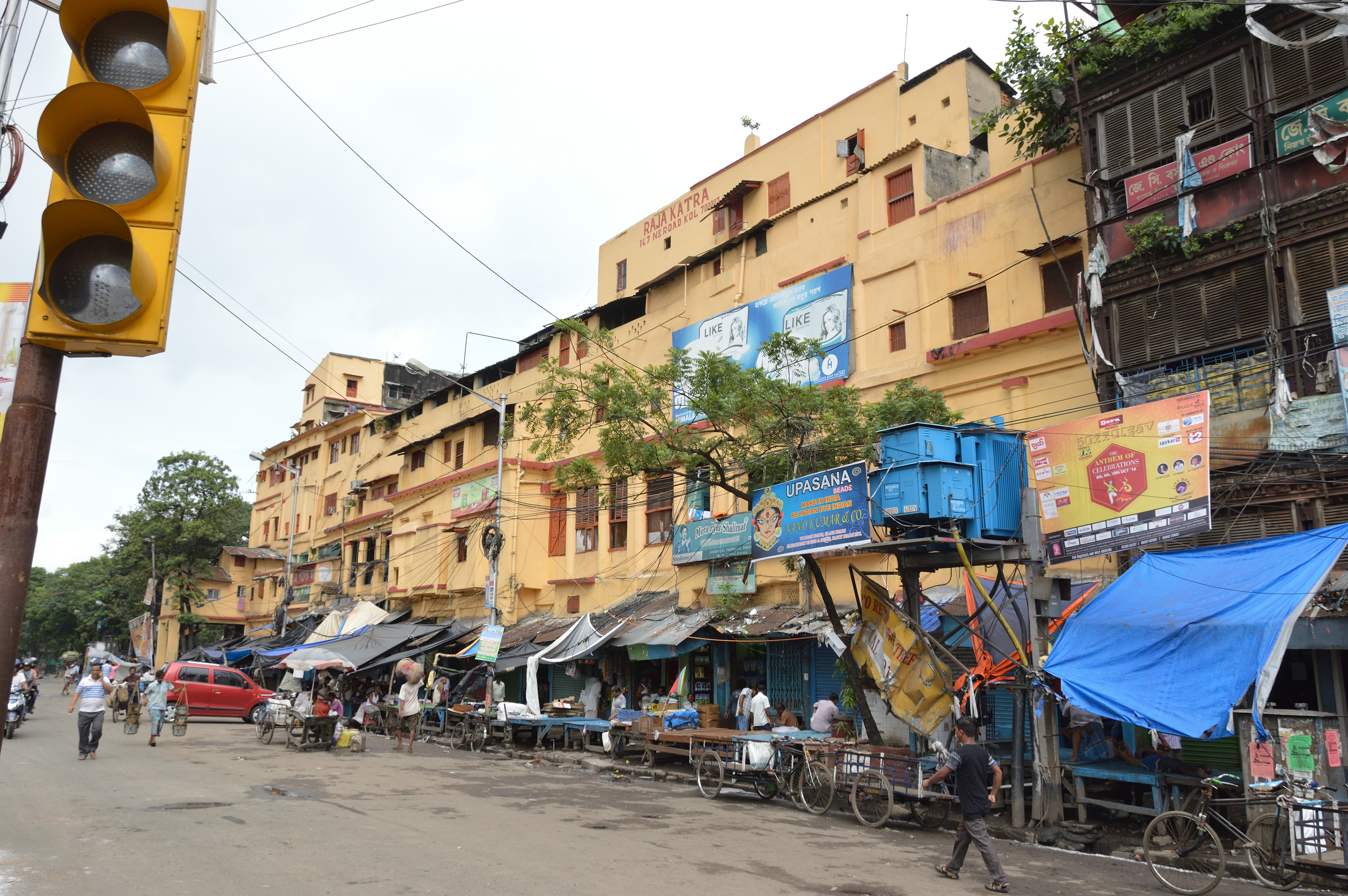
Raja Katra, Strand Road

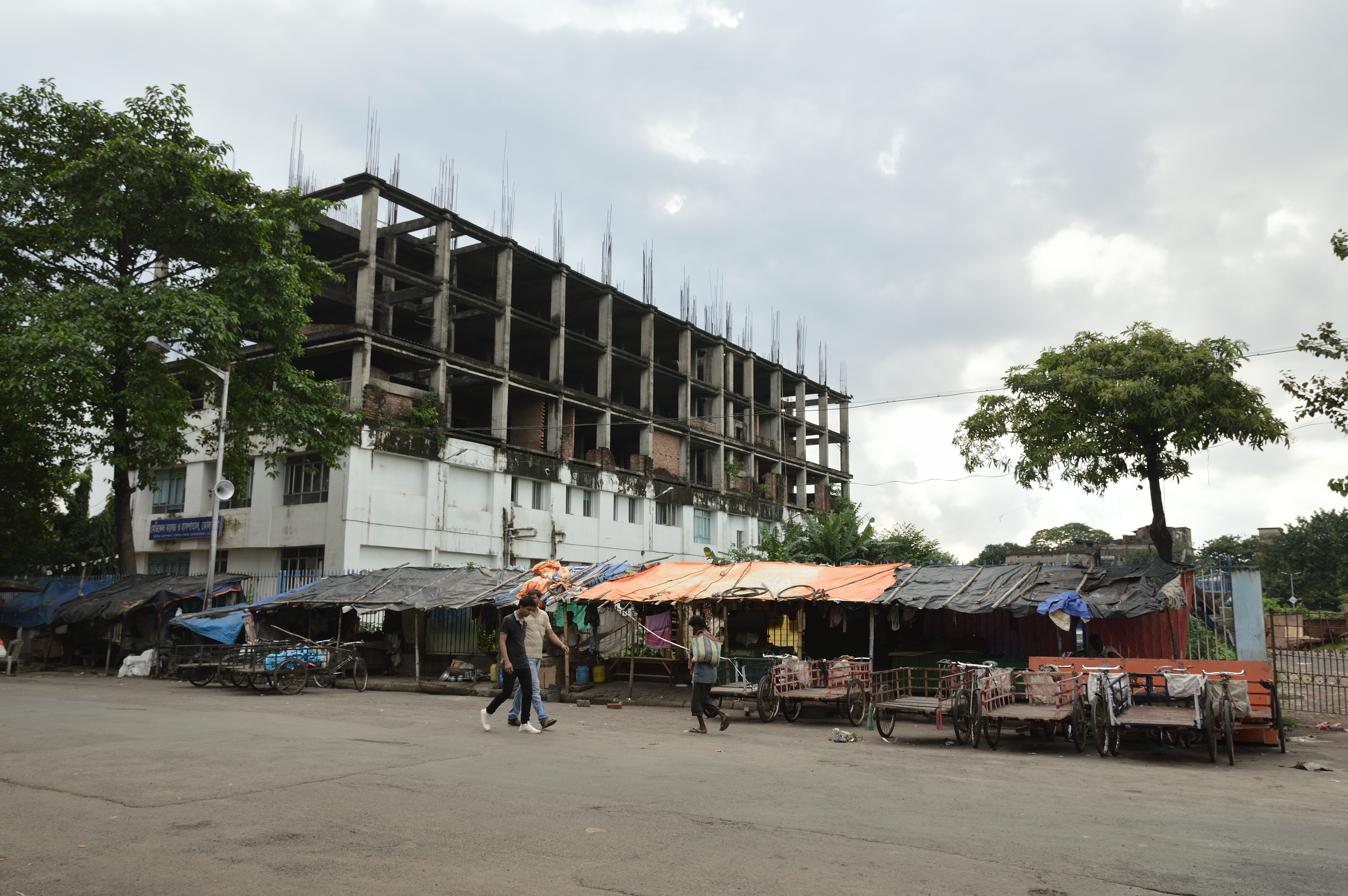
Mayo Hospital, Strand Road
