= General Post Office, New Delhi =

Post office building in India

- Interactive map of the General Post Office, New Delhi area
- Alternative names: New Delhi GPO

General information
- Status: Completed
- Type: Post office
- Architectural style: British colonial architecture
- Location: Gole Market, New Delhi, New Delhi, India
- Coordinates: 28°37′35.8″N 77°12′23.9″E
- Construction started: 1929
- Completed: 1931

Design and construction
- Architect: Robert Tor Russell

The New Delhi General Post Office (also known as Gole Dak Khana) is the central post office in New Delhi. The GPO is situated in the Gole Market area, within a roundabout formerly known as Alexandra Place. Its octagonal shape and low height were intentional design choices to ensure a clear view of the nearby Sacred Heart Cathedral.

The GPO was one of the first few public buildings in New Delhi built after the city became the new capital in 1911.

The New Delhi GPO received the Sevottam IS:15700-2005 certification from the Bureau of Indian Standards in 2011.

== The building ==
It is in octagonal in shape, designed to harmonize with the circular layout of Gole Market, where it is located. Its unique octagonal architecture sets it apart from typical post office designs, making it a landmark.

== See also ==
- General Post Office, Chennai
- General Post Office, Old Delhi
- General Post Office, Kolkata
- General Post Office, Mumbai
