= General Post Office (disambiguation) =

The General Post Office was the British postal system from 1660 until 1969.

The General Post Office may also refer to:

== Australia ==
- Former General Post Office, Adelaide
- General Post Office, Brisbane
- General Post Office, Hobart
- General Post Office, Launceston
- General Post Office, Melbourne
- General Post Office, Perth
- General Post Office, Sydney

== China ==
- General Post Office Building, Shanghai

== Croatia ==
- General Post Office, Zagreb

== Hong Kong ==
- General Post Office, Hong Kong

== India ==
- General Post Office, Old Delhi
- General Post Office, New Delhi
- General Post Office, Chennai
- General Post Office, Kolkata
- General Post Office, Mumbai
- General Post Office, Patna

== Ireland ==
- Cork General Post Office
- General Post Office, Dublin

== Macau ==
- Macau General Post Office

== Malaysia ==
- Kuala Lumpur General Post Office

== Malta ==
- The General Post Office in Valletta was housed in various buildings during the 19th and 20th centuries:
  - Banca Giuratale (1842–1886)
  - Palazzo Parisio (1886–1973)
  - Auberge d'Italie (1973–1997)

== Myanmar ==
- General Post Office, Yangon

== Pakistan ==
- General Post Office, Lahore

== Serbia ==
- General Post Office, Belgrade

== Singapore ==
- The Fullerton Hotel Singapore, formerly the General Post Office Building

== Sri Lanka ==
- Former General Post Office, Colombo
- Kandy General Post Office

== Thailand ==
- General Post Office (Bangkok)

== United Kingdom ==
- General Post Office, Edinburgh
- General Post Office, London

== United States ==
- General Post Office (Washington, D.C.)
- James A. Farley Building, New York, formerly the General Post Office Building

== See also ==
- Central Post Office (disambiguation)
