= Robert Tor Russell =

British architect

Robert Tor Russell CIE DSO
- Born: 1888; Hitchin, Hertfordshire, England
- Died: 1972 (aged 83–84); Tiverton, Devon, England
- Education: Bedford Modern School
- Known for: Chief Architect to the Public Works Department, Government of India
- Parent: Samuel Bridgman Russell

Robert Tor Russell CIE DSO (1888–1972) was a British architect. In his position as Chief Architect to the Public Works Department of the Government of India, he is primarily associated with the development of the city of New Delhi in the early 1930s. He designed some of the city's most notable buildings and was the architect of Connaught Place, the financial centre of the new capital. Russell also served with distinction during the First World War, and later, after retiring from India, became a civil servant for the British Government.

== Early life ==
Robert Tor Russell was born in Hitchin, Hertfordshire in 1888 and was educated at Bedford Modern School. In 1906, he became a pupil of his father, the architect Samuel Bridgman Russell (1864–1955), and qualified to practice in 1913. In 1914, he was offered the position of assistant to John Begg, consulting architect to the Government of India.

== Career ==
=== Military service ===
Russell's career in architecture was interrupted by the First World War. He served in Mesopotamia (Iraq) with the Artists Rifles and was Mentioned in Despatches and awarded the Distinguished Service Order for action during the British advance on Turkish-held Baghdad in the early months of 1917. His citation was as follows:

For conspicuous gallantry and devotion to duty in charging the enemy's trench which was strongly held. He then led a bombing attack and cleared two-hundred yards of the trench. Later, he maintained his position for four hours, when reinforcements arrived.

=== New Delhi ===
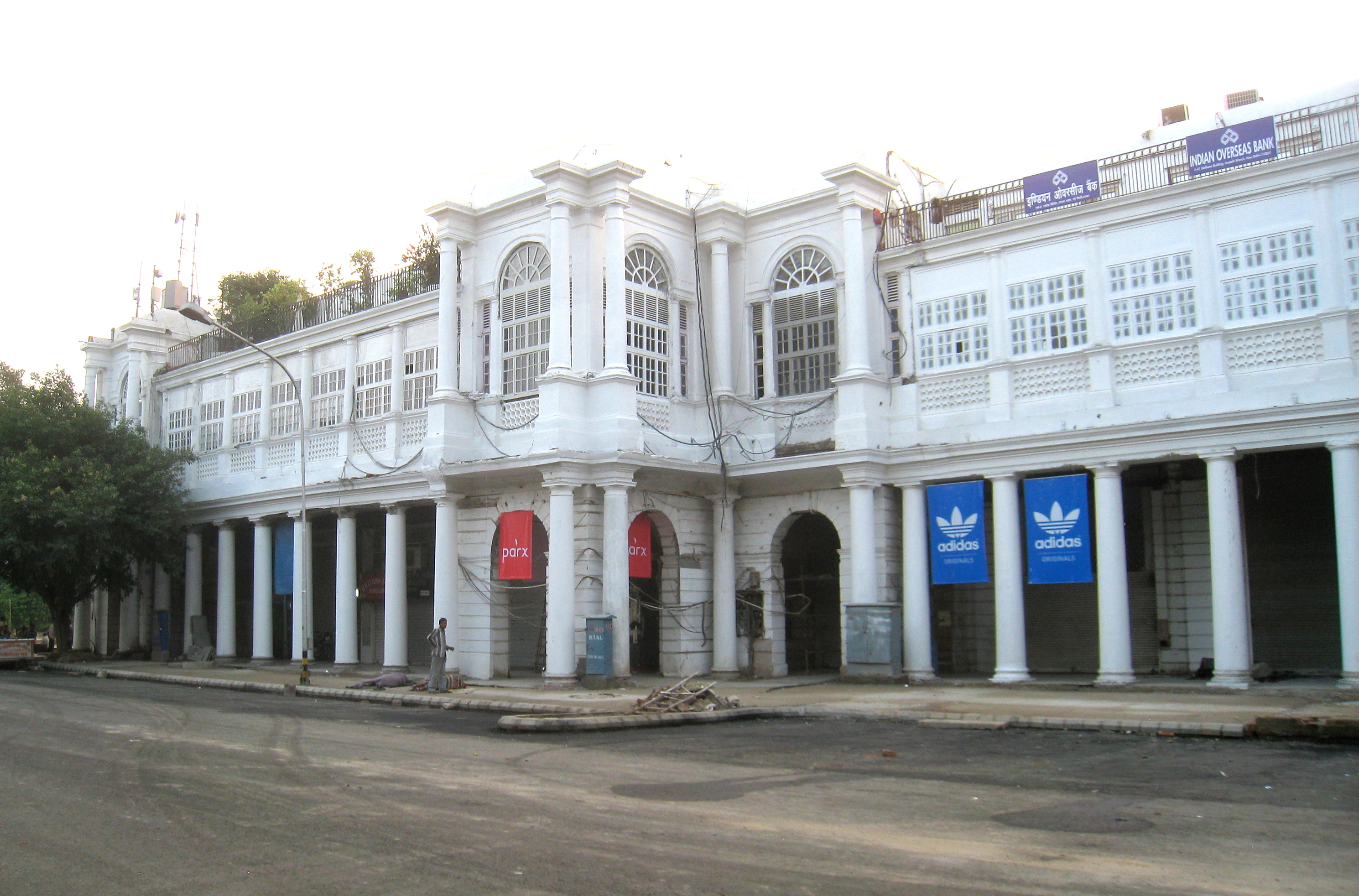
Connaught Place, New Delhi

In 1919, he returned to India and rose to become Chief Architect to the PWD. In this position, he led the team that established the monumental architecture of New Delhi, according to the neo-classical model envisaged by Sir Edwin Lutyens. His main creative period was between 1929 and 1933, the peak of the Construction of New Delhi. During this period, he designed Teen Murti Bhavan (Flagstaff House) originally for the Commander in Chief of the British Indian Army; it subsequently became the residence of Jawaharlal Nehru. The Eastern and Western Courts on Janpath (Queensway) built to accommodate Indian legislators were Russell's work, as were the bungalows numbers 1,3,5,7, Race Course Road, which now comprise 7, Race Course Road, the official residence of the Indian Prime Minister.

Russell also designed Safdarjung Airport, National Stadium, Delhi, and several colonial mansions and government housing in the area which is known as Lutyens' Delhi In 1931, he designed the round New Delhi General Post Office (Gole Dak Khana) building in the Gole Market locality. Situated inside a busy roundabout earlier known as Alexandra Place. He also designed the Pataudi Palace for the Nawabs of Pataudi, in Haryana. Russell's most obvious legacy is Connaught Place, two concentric circles of colonnaded streets modelled after the Georgian architecture of Royal Crescent in the English city of Bath, which became the commercial hub of the City.

He was appointed CIE for his work on the development of New Delhi in 1930.

== Later life ==
Russell retired from India in 1941 and returned to Britain whereupon he took on the position as Chief Planning Inspector for the Ministry of Housing and Local Government until 1954. He had married Ethel Hatch in 1921 and they had one son and one daughter. He retired to Tiverton, Devon where he died in 1972.

== Gallery ==
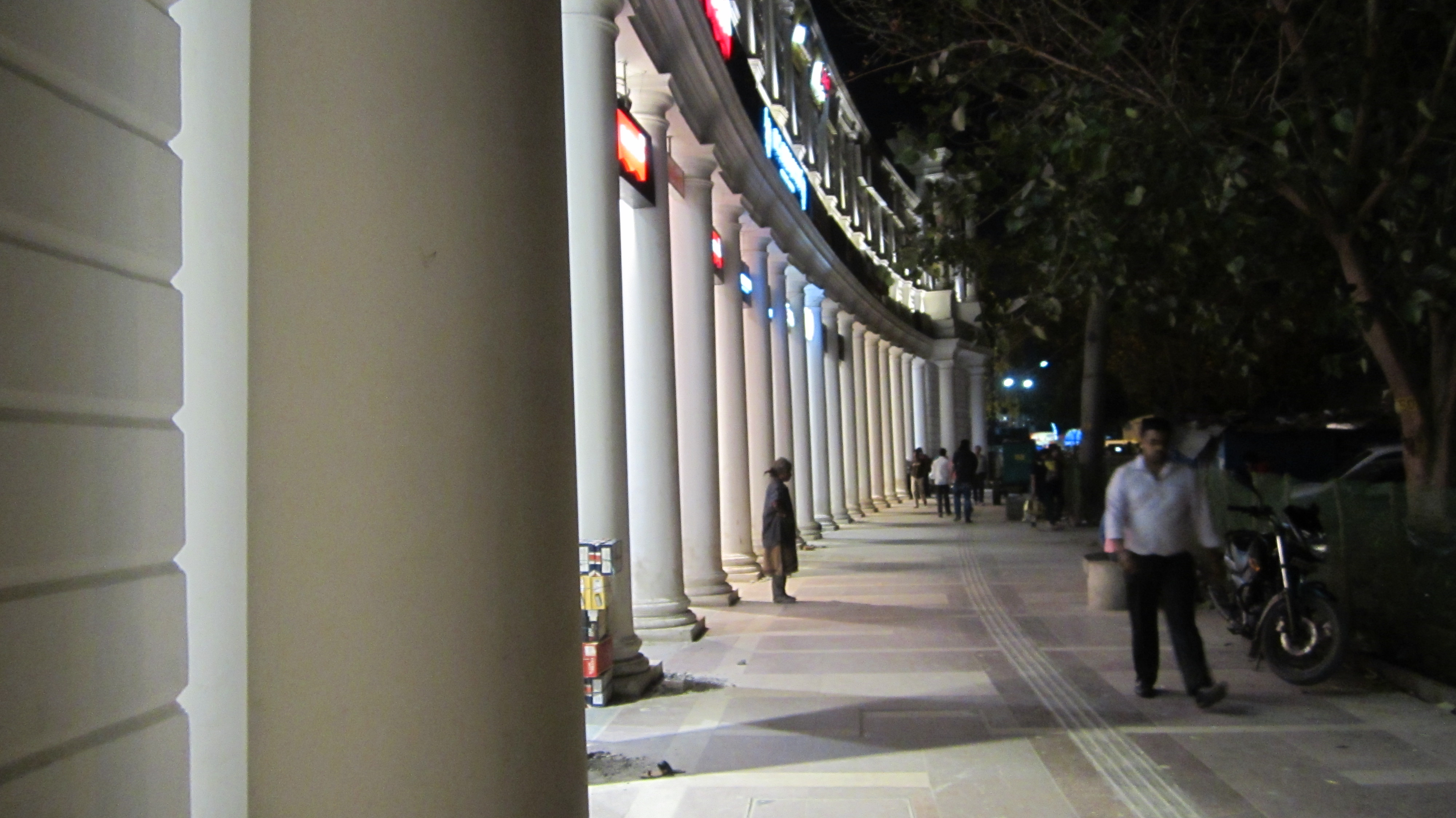
Columns at Connaught Place

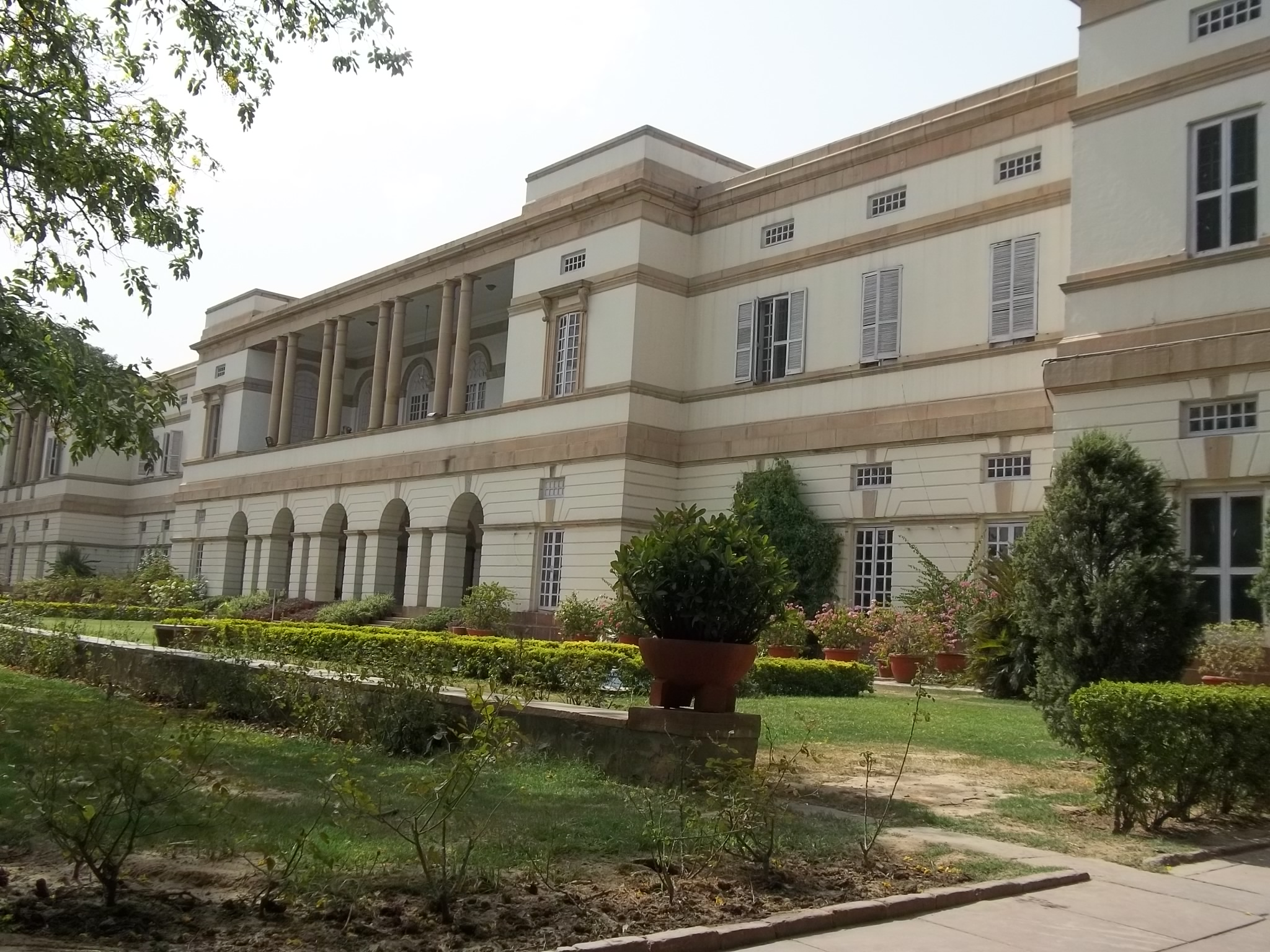
Teen Murti Bhavan, New Delhi

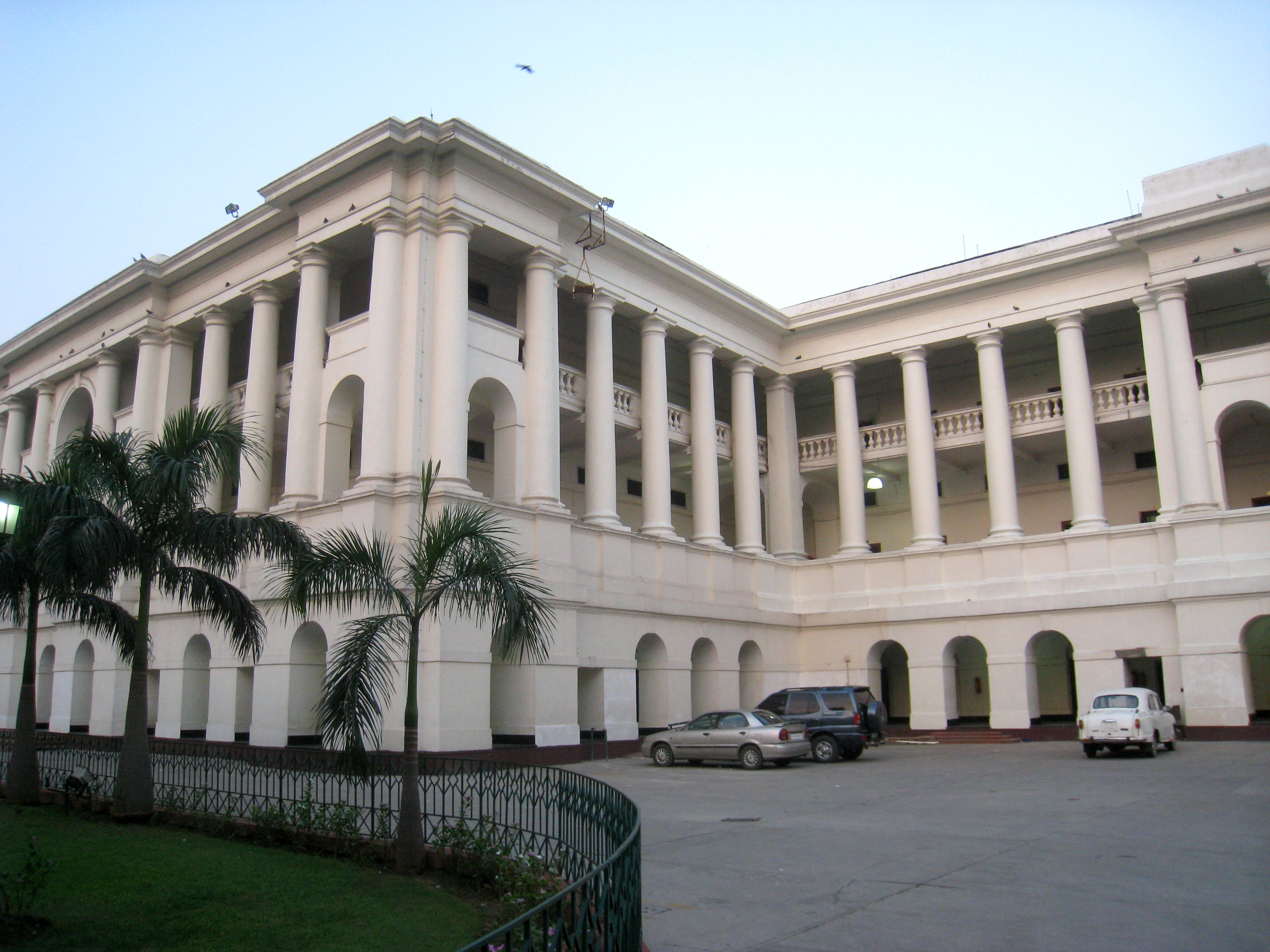
Western Court, New Delhi

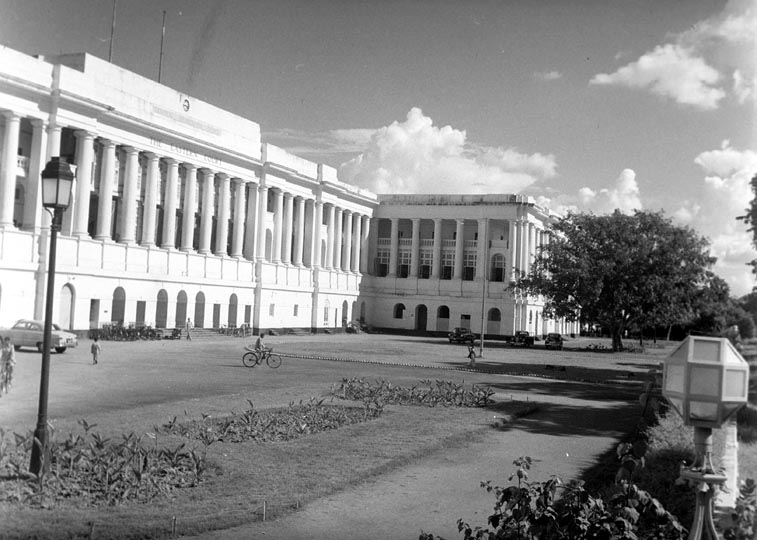
Eastern Court, New Delhi

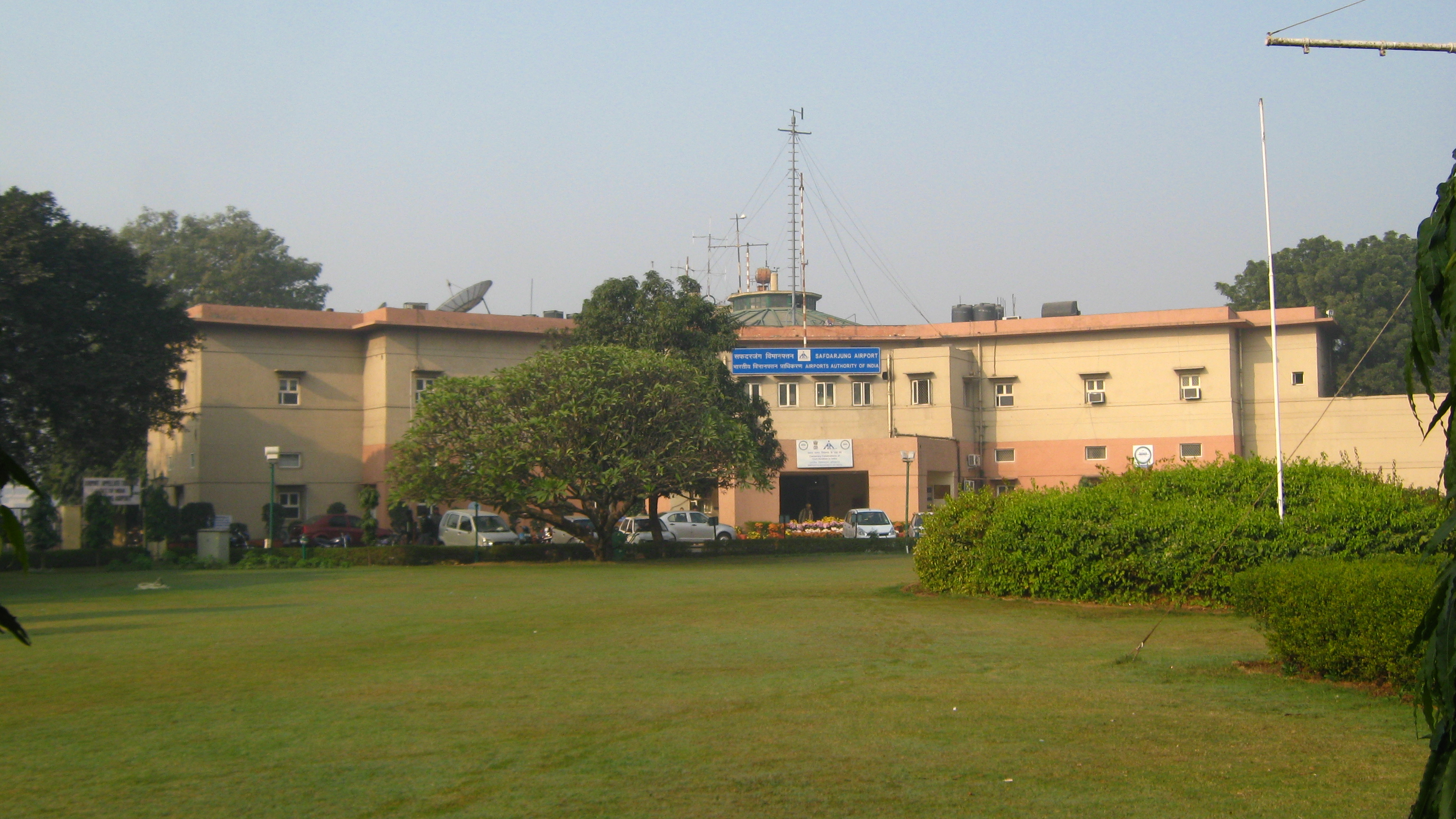
Safdarjung Airport

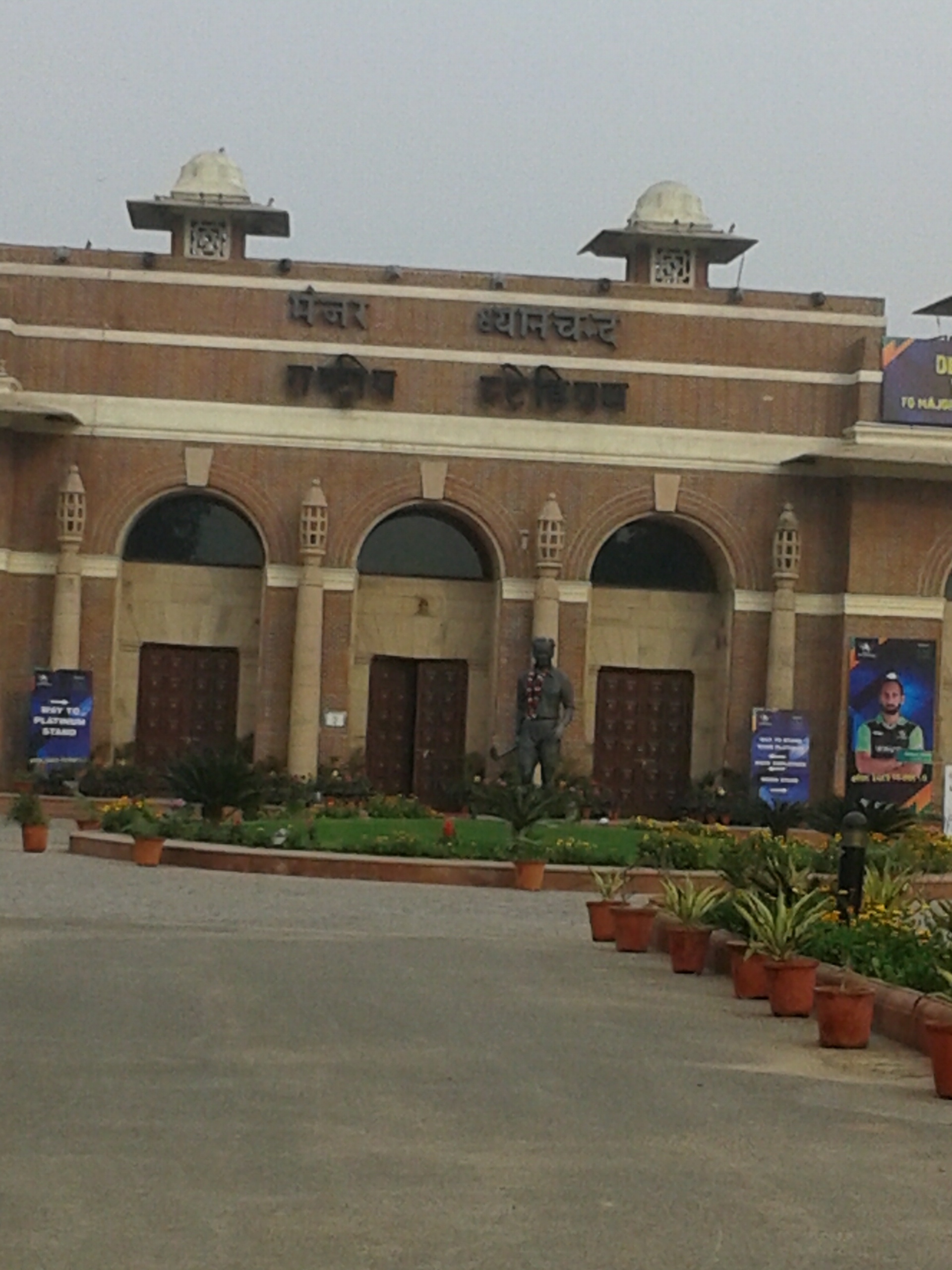
National Stadium, Delhi

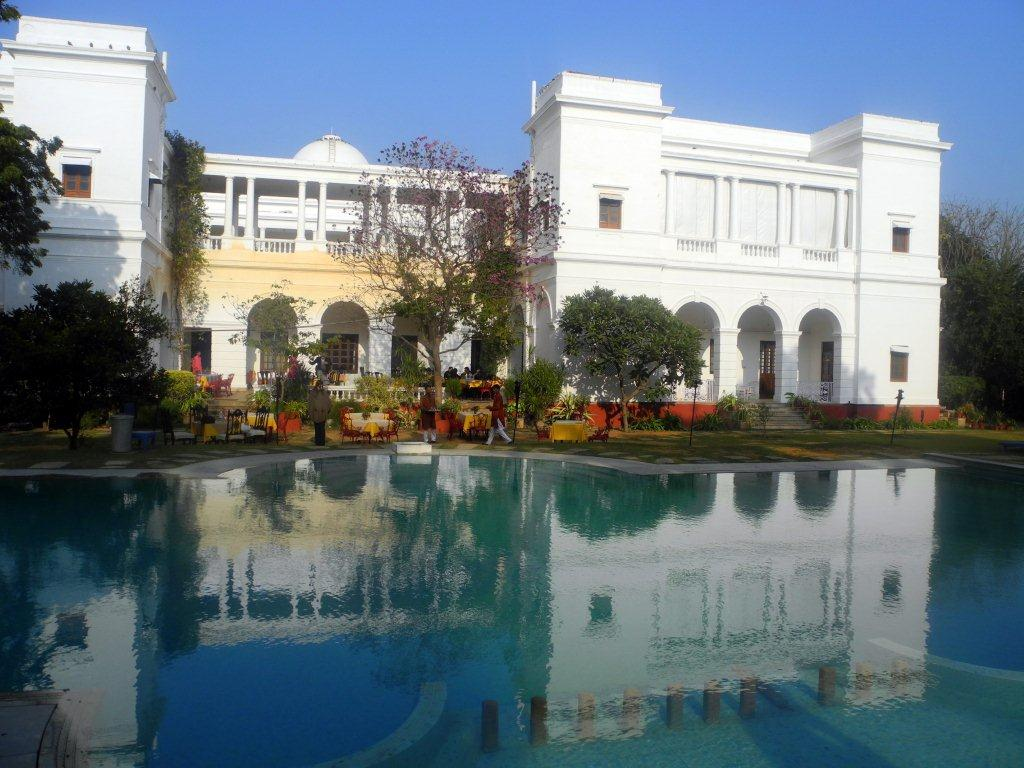
Pataudi Palace
