= Post Office Building =

Post Office Building may refer to:

China

- General Post Office Building, Shanghai

United States

- Any one of numerous buildings listed at List of United States post offices

== See also ==
- General Post Office (disambiguation)
