= Central Post Office =

Central Post Office may refer to:

- Buenos Aires Central Post Office
- Central Post Office Building (Jerusalem)
- Kowloon Central Post Office
- Central Post Office (Kyiv)
- Manila Central Post Office
- Central Post Office (Ottawa)
- Saigon Central Post Office
- Central Post Office Building (Santiago)
- Central Post Office Building (Stockholm)

== See also ==
- Post office
- General Post Office (disambiguation)
