= General Post Office, Lahore =

Coordinates: 31.5657°N 74.3133°E

General Post Office (GPO)
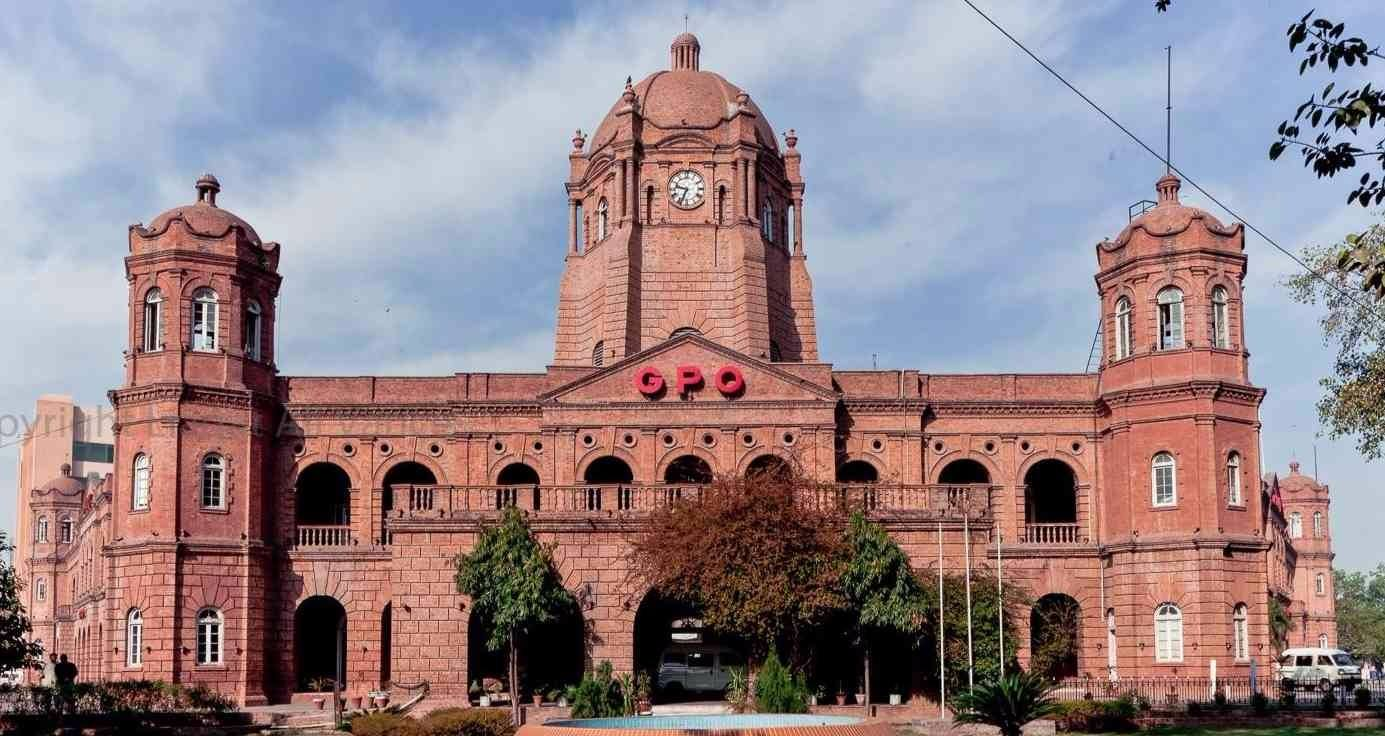
- Interactive map of the General Post Office (GPO) area

General information
- Location: Lahore-54000, Pakistan
- Completed: 1887

The General Post Office (abbreviated: GPO) is the main post office in Lahore, Pakistan. It is located at GPO Chowk on Mall Road near Anarkali Bazaar.

The GPO building is accessible through two main gates: Gate 1 serves as the primary entrance, while Gate 2, situated at the intersection of McLeod Road and the Mall, functions as the hub for incoming and outgoing mail. On average, it handles 20,000 pieces of mail per day.

== History ==
It was built in 1887 to commemorate Queen Victoria's Golden Jubilee and replaced the telegraph office of Anarkali Bazar. The building was designed and built by Sir Ganga Ram, one of the leading architects of that time, and was built near the shrine of the 17th century saint Shah Chiragh.

== Building ==
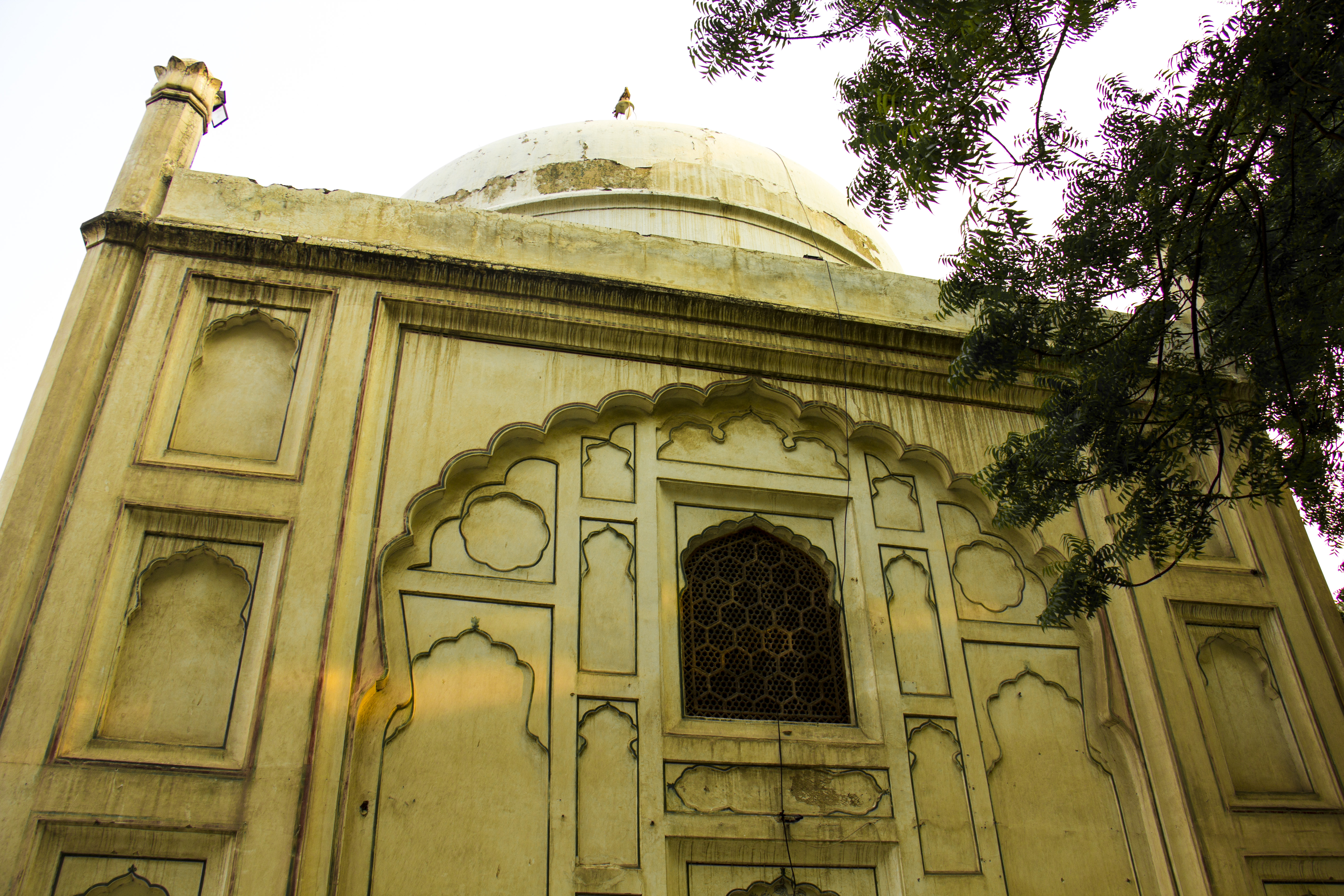
GPO was built near the shrine of Shah Chiragh, who was a prominent saint during the Shah Jahan era.

The building consists of two main halls and two minarets. It is organized into three main sections: Domestic Mail and Financial Services, the International Mail Office (managed by the controller, who also meets with the Post Master General), and the Delivery Service, where bulk mail is processed and dispatched. The Domestic Mail area includes counters for public mail deposits and collections and features a seller of historical stamps, highlighting the evolution of postal costs from 20 paisas to the current eight rupees for a basic stamp.

At the center of the GPO’s operations is the Chief Post Master's office, located upstairs beneath the malfunctioning clock tower and an historical iron bell marked "Made in 1860." Nearby, the treasury department is located which records the transactions of stamps.

== See also ==
- General Post Office (disambiguation)
