= Gole Market =

- Neighborhood of Delhi
- Location in Delhi, India
- Coordinates: 28.6337°N 77.2056°E
- Country: India
- State: Delhi
- District: New Delhi

Government
  - Body: New Delhi Municipal Council

Languages
  - Official: Hindi, English
- Time zone: UTC+5:30 (IST)
- PIN: 110001
- Nearest city: Delhi
- Lok Sabha constituency: New Delhi Parliamentary Constituency
- Civic agency: NDMC

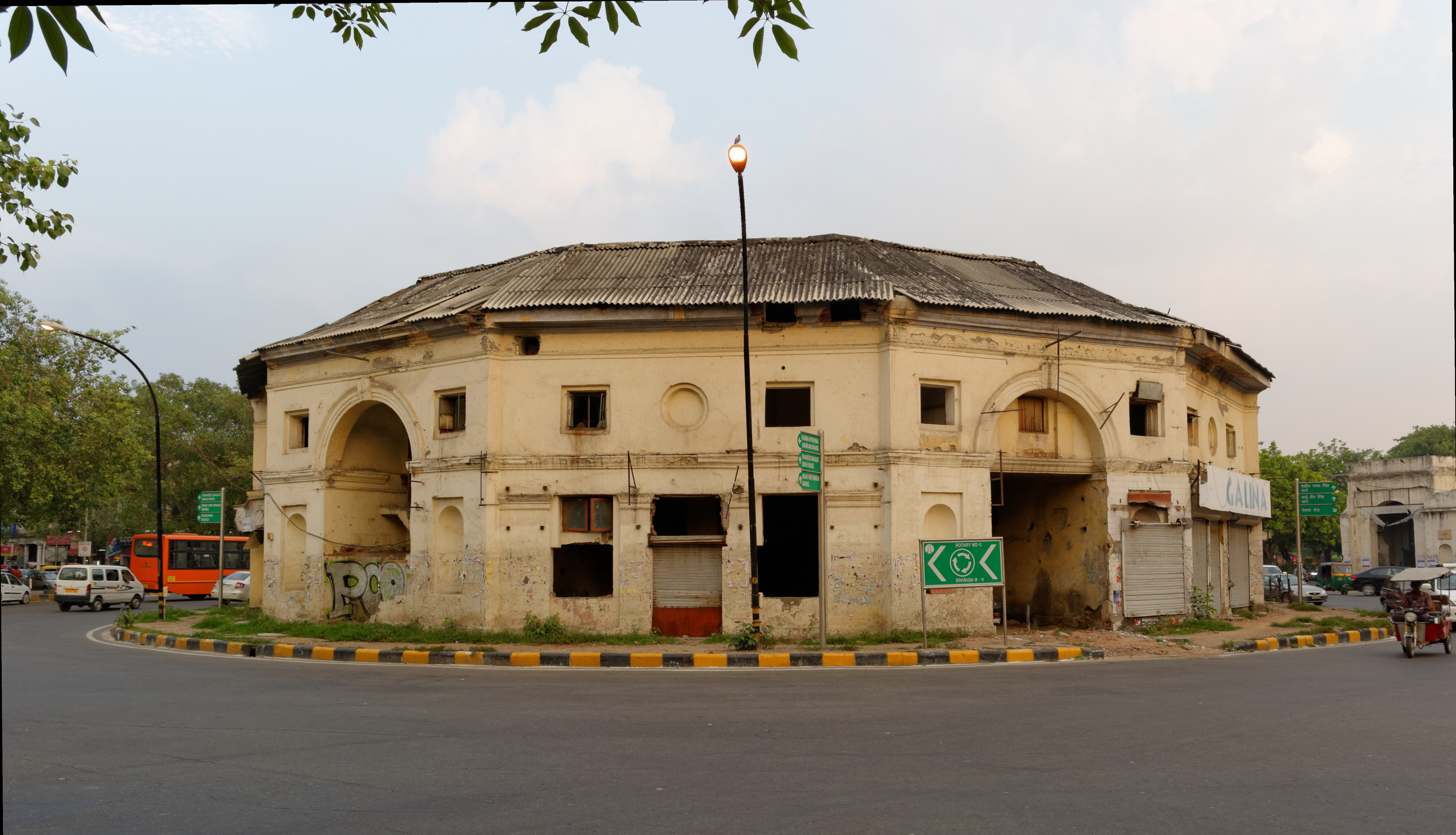
Gol Market, New Delhi.

Gole Market is a retail location in the heart of New Delhi, India, built within a traffic roundabout by Edwin Lutyens in 1921, and giving its name also to the wider neighborhood. It is one of New Delhi's oldest surviving colonial markets and is considered an architecturally significant structure. The octagonal market was built in the axis planned by Lutyens as part of the city's layout. Peshwa Road, Ramakrishna Ashram Road, Shaheed Bhagat Singh Road, and Bhai Veer Singh Road are the four radial roads leading from the market.

== History ==
Gole Market (Peshwa Road) Picture taken from roof of M.S.Flats

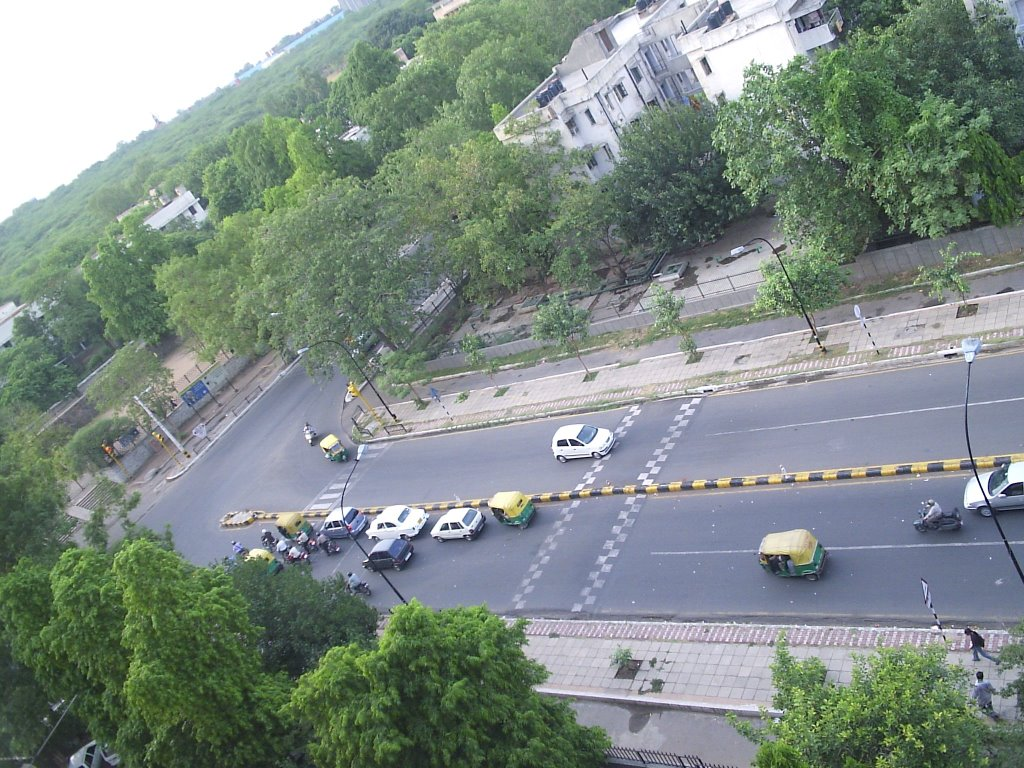
Gole Market (Peshwa Road, T-point) Picture taken from roof of M.S.Flats. The green area at the background is the central ridge forest.

Durga Puja Visarjan procession passing through Gol Dak Khana (adjacent to Gole Market).

The octagonal market, designed by Edwin Lutyens, was built in 1921 as an important part of a wider development plan. In the years that followed, the Connaught Place shopping area was built adjacent to it, catering to the daily needs of thousands of government employees living in nearby residential areas built for them in 1924. These employees worked at the nearby Secretariat Building, as most government offices had relocated from Old Delhi a decade before the new capital had been inaugurated in 1931. Many of the employees were brought into the new capital from distant parts of India, including the Bengal Presidency and Madras Presidency.

After the partition of India, noted painter B.C. Sanyal and his wife Snehlata, a ghazal singer and actress moved to Gole Market. Their "refugee studio" became a hub for artists and students in New Delhi and was later known as Gallery 26. The studio later gave rise to the Delhi Shilpi Chakra, which Sanyal founded with several of her artist friends. This organisation had an important influence on the contemporary art of North India.

By the turn of the 21st century, 28 shops operated in the market, most of them dating back to the 1920s. They included numerous confectioneries, sweet shops, and fast-food restaurants, including Kaleva, Bengali Sweet Shop, Karachi Sweet Shop, and several meat shops. Over the years, the facade deteriorated as a result of unauthorized construction and additions and was in a state of disrepair. The New Delhi Municipal Council (NDMC) fined several shopkeepers for operating without proper licenses or for unhygienic conditions.

In 2007, the building was declared unsafe and the NDMC offered shopkeepers alternative shops but they rejected this plan. This forced the NDMC to engage in restoration work. Later, the NDMC proposed granting full heritage status to the building and ending all commercial activities. The traffic police supported the move because running a market in the busy roundabout caused traffic congestion. By May 2009, eviction notices were served to the shopkeepers by the NDMC, which soon had six shops in its possession. The rest of the owners started a campaign against the forced move.

Later, the NDMC revealed new plans to convert the heritage market into a museum. In February 2013, twenty-eight of the market's shopkeepers petitioned against the NDMC's alleged move to take over their shops in the Delhi High Court. On 20 June 2013, the court ruled in favor of the NDMC but cautioned it against the non-commercial use of the property. The court instructed the shopkeepers to relinquish possession of their stores by 30 June 2013. On 27 June, the Supreme Court upheld the eviction date that had been ordered by the High Court.

== Gole Market locality ==
=== General Post Office ===
The New Delhi General Post Office, which was built in 1931, is approximately 800 meters (2,600 ft) away from the Gole Market. It is also known as Gole Dak Khana due to the octagonal shape of the building. It was designed by Robert Tor Russell, the chief architect of the Public Works Department (PWD). It stands inside a busy roundabout earlier known as Alexandra Place, and its height was kept low to allow a clear view of the nearby Sacred Heart Cathedral.

=== Education ===
The area around Gole Market is home to a number of schools including NP Boys Senior Secondary School, Harcourt butler senior secondary school, St. Columba's School, Convent of Jesus and Mary, N P Bengali Girls Senior Secondary School, Elisabeth Hall-Shiv Niketan School, Kali Bari Dayanand Model Public School, Ranoor Paathshaala, Raisina Bengali School, Kaali Bari, NP Primary School, Kendriya Vidyalaya Gole Market, and D.T.E.A Senior Secondary School.

=== Religious buildings ===
Churches

- Sacred Heart Cathedral (Delhi, India), with the Archbishop's House located within the same compound
- St. Peter's Jacobite Syrian Orthodox Cathedral, located at a site "handpicked" by Indira Gandhi.
- Church of North India
- Delhi Bible Fellowship
- Mar Thoma Centre, Delhi Diocese
- The Indian Pentecostal Church of God's northern region is based in Bhaiveer Singh Marg.

Temples

- Laxminarayan Temple (Birla Mandir)
- Kali Bari Mandir on Mandir Marg
- Hanuman Temple, Connaught Place
- Arya Samaj Mandir (Mandir marg)

Gurdwaras

- Gurudwara Bangla Sahib

Mosques

- Kalali Bagh Masjid, Ramakrishna Ashram Marg

== Politics ==
Gole Market is located about one kilometer (0.62 mi) away from the commercial center of Connaught Place and two kilometers (1.2 mi) away from the President's House and the Parliament House. Located in close proximity to various political buildings, it also houses the Communist Party of India's Delhi headquarters.

The Gole Market area was a Delhi Metropolitan Council constituency within New Delhi Lok Sabha constituency between 1966 and 1993, and later a Delhi State Assembly constituency within the South Delhi Lok Sabha constituency from 1993 to 2008. Chief Minister Sheila Dikshit contested and won the Gole Market seat in the 1998 and 2003 assembly elections. However, after the delimitation exercise in 2008, the seat ceased to exist and is now the New Delhi constituency.
