= General Post Office, Mumbai =

Central post office of Mumbai, India

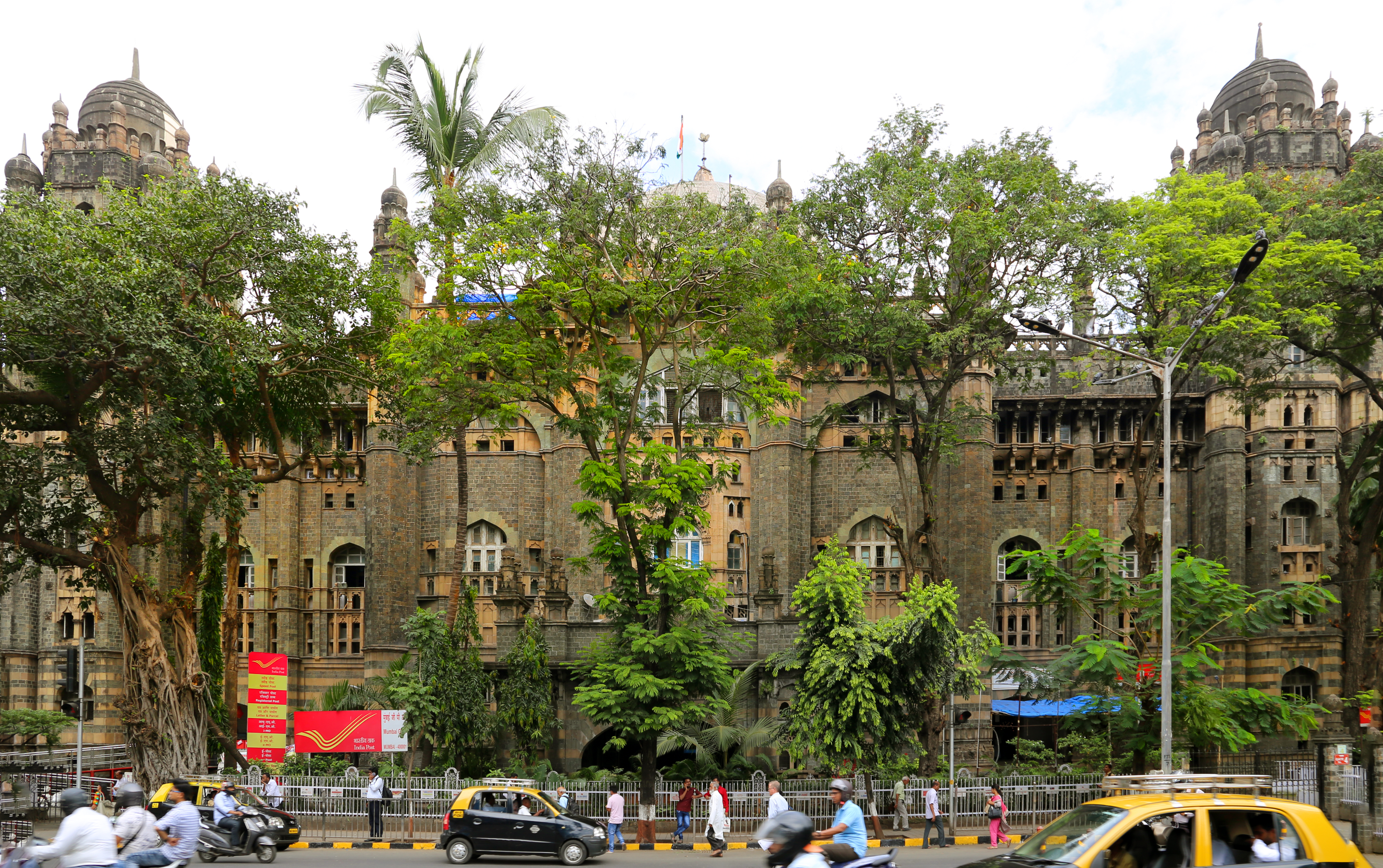
- Façade of General Post Office, Mumbai, in 2019
- Interactive map of the General Post Office, Mumbai area

General information
- Type: Post office
- Architectural style: Indo-Saracenic
- Location: Fort, Mumbai, India
- Coordinates: 18°56′19.56″N 72°50′13.34″E
- Construction started: 1904; 122 years ago
- Completed: 1913; 113 years ago

Design and construction
- Architect: John Begg

Other information
- Public transit access: Chhatrapati Shivaji Terminus

The General Post Office, Mumbai, is the central post office of the city of Mumbai, India. The post office handles most of the city's inbound and outbound mail and parcels. Situated in the vicinity of Chhatrapati Shivaji Terminus, the Mumbai General Post Office (GPO) is a paradigm of Indo-Saracenic architecture.

Mumbai GPO is one of the five Philatelic Bureaus in the country (others being Chennai GPO, Kolkata GPO, Parliament Street, and New Delhi GPO) that are authorised to sell the United Nations stamps.

== The building ==
The GPO is modelled on the Gol Gumbaz in Bijapur, Karnataka. It was designed by British architect John Begg, a consultant architect to the British government. Begg designed the structure in 1902, and construction began on 1 September 1904. It was completed on 13 March 1913 at a cost of ₹1,809,000. Black basalt, with a dressing of yellow Kurla stone and white stones from Dhrangdra are the predominant materials used.

The building has an area of 120,000 square feet (11,000 m^{2}) and replaced the current Central Telegraph Office at Flora Fountain as the new GPO. The chief feature of the architecture of this building is an ethereal central hall which rises up to the great dome.

== Operations ==
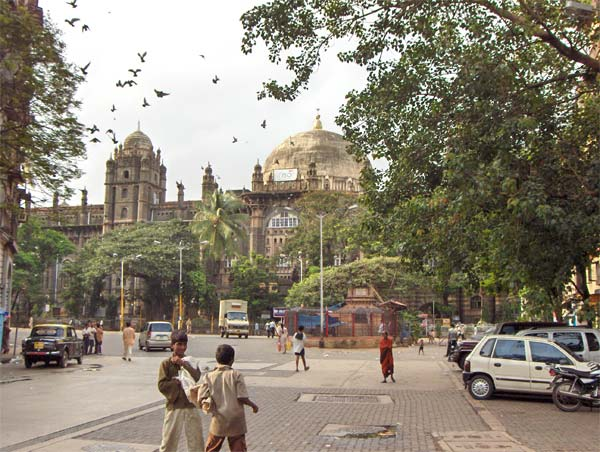
Mumbai GPO

As the chief post office of the city, the GPO handles huge volumes of mail and passes them on to other post offices in the city. The GPO has the Postal Index Number (PIN) 400 001. Due to its proximity to Chhatrapati Shivaji Maharaj Terminus, Mumbai's central station, it is ideally situated to dispatch and receive mail to and from other cities in India. It also controls the smaller post offices in Mumbai, issues stamps, and prints new inland letterheads and postcards. It also has a philately section for enthusiasts.

== War memorial ==
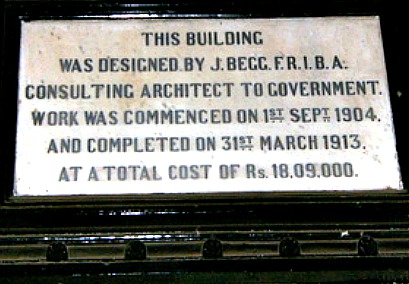
A marble plaque

A war memorial plaque commemorating the Post Office of India employees in the service of the British Indian Army who died in the First World War exists in the building.

== GPO construction plaque ==
This plaque indicates the date of completion of the building in 1913. The total cost was ₹1,809,000.

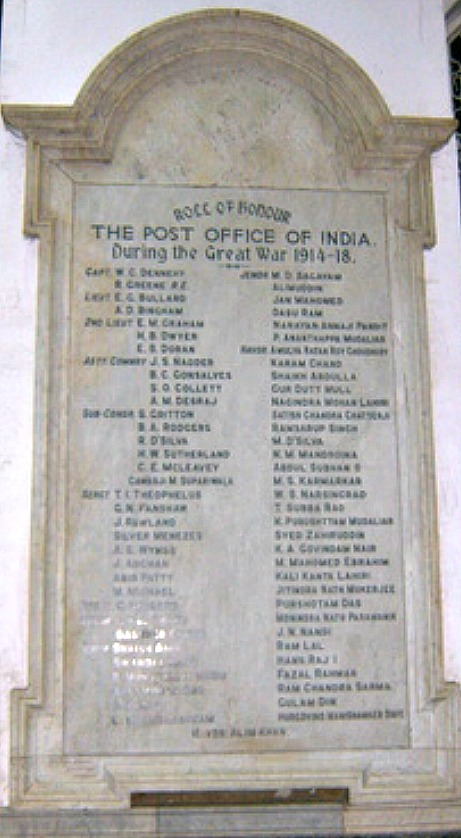
'Roll of honour display board'

== See also ==
- Indian Postal Service
- General Post Office, Chennai
- General Post Office, Kolkata
- General Post Office, New Delhi
- General Post Office, Old Delhi
- General Post Office in the United Kingdom
- Other General Post Offices
- Fort (area)
