= Samuel Bridgman Russell =

Scottish architect

Samuel Bridgman Russell (9 August 1864 – 2 August 1955) was a Scottish architect who became chief architect to the Ministry of Health and after the Tudor Walters Report and the Housing, Town Planning, &c. Act 1919 designed to a series of model houses, which were copied extensively throughout the United Kingdom in the council estates of the 1920s and 1930s.

== Early life ==
Born in 1864, Russell had been articled to Henry Hewitt Bridgman 1881–84 and had studied at the Royal Academy Schools from 1882, thereafter becoming a draughtsman in the office of Thomas Chatfield Clarke, who designed the Royal Bank of Scotland building in Bishopsgate, London. He entered partnership with James Glen Sivewright Gibson in 1890. The partnership of Gibson and Russell was dissolved in 1899, Russell entering into partnership with Edwin Cooper.

== Housing department of the Ministry of Health ==
Dr Addison appointed a number of architects to draw up designs for model plans for worker cottages (houses). This was the first time that workers cottages had the benefit of professional design. Russell drew up most of the cottage plans. He established "the cardinal principles of good design as the proper dispositions of streets and buildings". The living room should benefit from the sunny aspect, the larder should be in a cool position and the coal store should be easily accessed from both within the building and from outside the house. The rear should be clear of projections that cut off both light and air, and the passageways, stairways and landings free from waste. Local authorities were free to draw up their own designs; but all were compared to those of Russell.

== Buildings ==
He is credited with:

- Eastriggs Garden Village, Eastriggs, Dumfriesshire
- 1890: London County Council Municipal Lodging House
- 1892: St Pancras Municipal Buildings, St Pancras, London
- 1896: North Bridge, Edinburgh
- 1897: Town Hall, Cardiff
- 1898: Bromley Hospital, Bromley, London
- 1899: Cartwright Memorial Hall, Bradford
- 1911–13: Brighton Hove & Sussex Sixth Form College (BHASVIC), Brighton, East Sussex
- 1913: Dalziel High School, Motherwell
- 1916: Garden Village, Gretna
