= General Post Office, Old Delhi =

Indian postal office

General Post Office
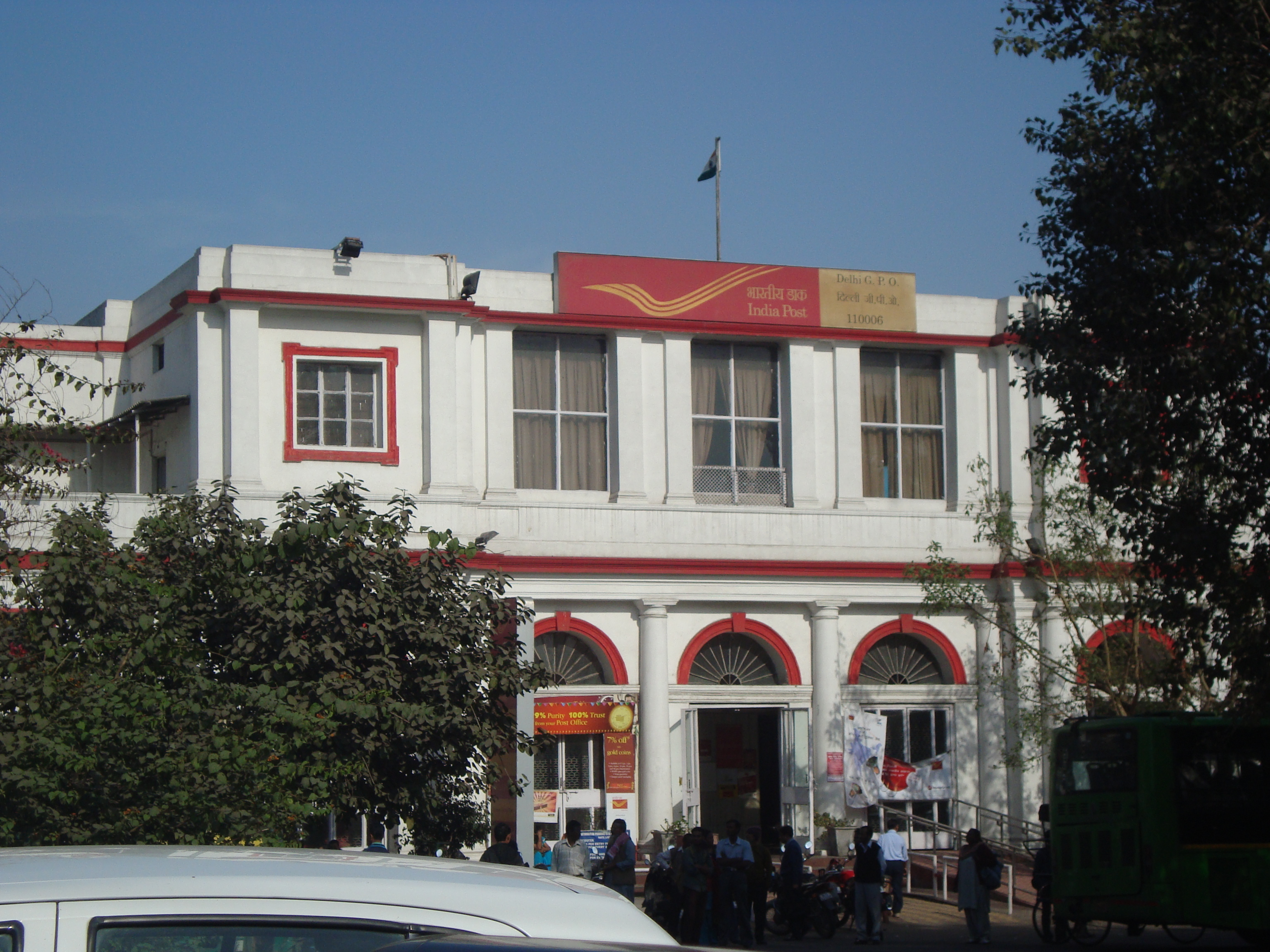
- Interactive map of the General Post Office area

General information
- Type: Post office
- Location: Old Delhi, India
- Coordinates: 28.6621°N 77.2354°E

Height
- Architectural: Neoclassical and colonial

The General Post Office (GPO) in Old Delhi is a post office for India Post. In operation since 1885, during the British Raj, the GPO was built near the Old Delhi Railway Station near the Kashmiri Gate in the old city wall; it is the oldest post office in Delhi.

Built in the neoclassical style of colonial architecture, the two-storey building's facade is divided into five bays by engaged columns of the classical Tuscan order on the ground storey, and by pilasters on the upper storey.

== See also ==
- General Post Office, Chennai
- General Post Office, Kolkata
- General Post Office, Mumbai
