= Post office =

Customer service facility of a postal system

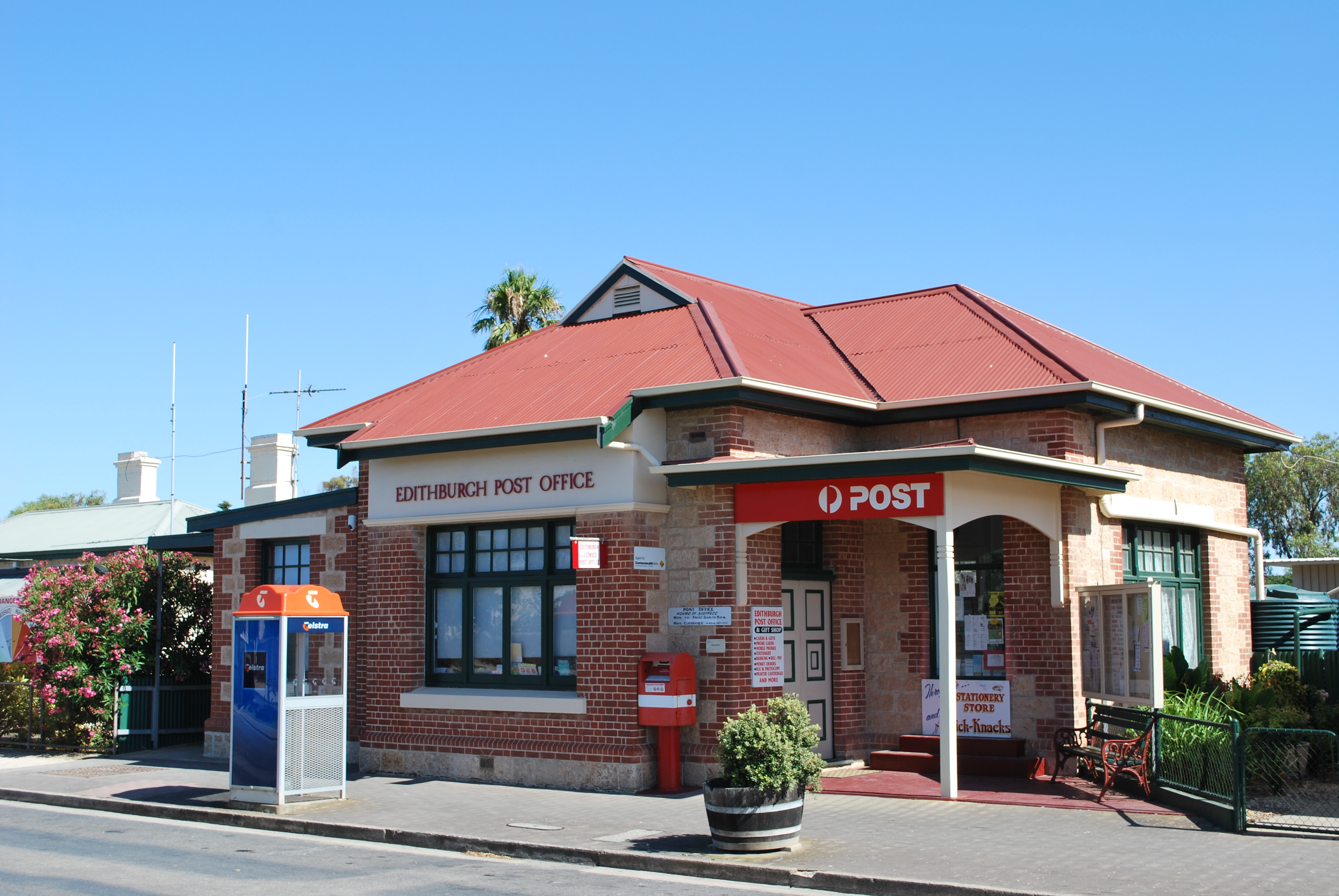
A post office building in Edithburgh, Australia

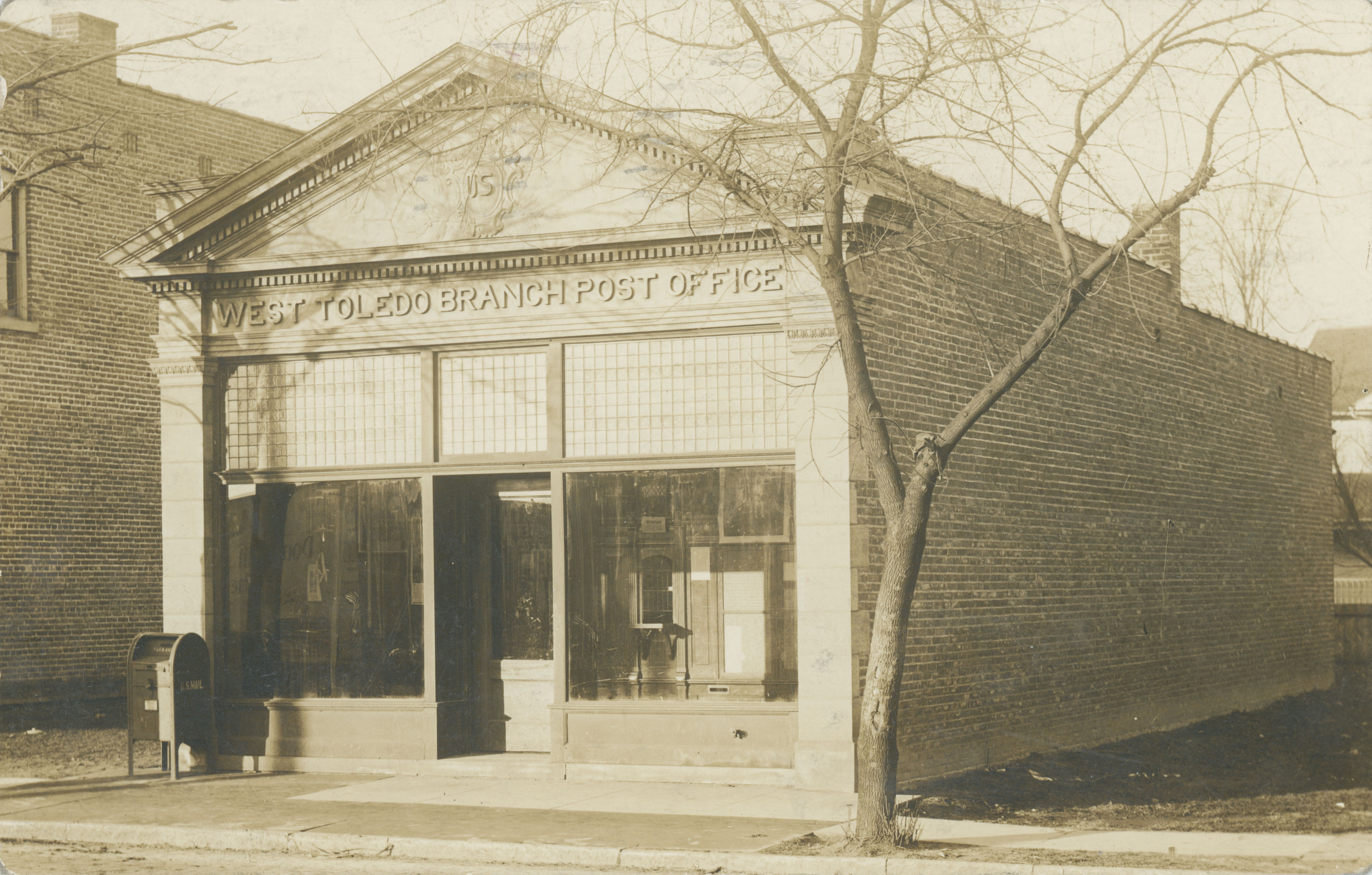
The West Toledo Branch Post Office in Toledo, Ohio, in 1912

A post office is a public facility and a retailer that provides mail services, such as accepting letters and parcels, providing post office boxes, and selling postage stamps, packaging, and stationery. Post offices may offer additional services, which vary by country. These include providing and accepting government forms (such as passport applications), and processing government services and fees (such as road tax, postal savings, or bank fees). The chief administrator of a post office is called a postmaster. During the 19th century, when the postal deliveries were made, it would often be delivered to public places. For example, it would be sent to bars or general stores. This would often be delivered with newspapers and those who were expecting a post would go into town to pick up the mail, along with anything that was needed to be picked up in town.

Before the advent of postal codes and the post office, postal systems would route items to a specific post office for receipt or delivery. During the 19th century in the United States, this often led to smaller communities being renamed after their post offices, particularly after the Post Office Department began to require that post office names not be duplicated within a state.

== Name ==
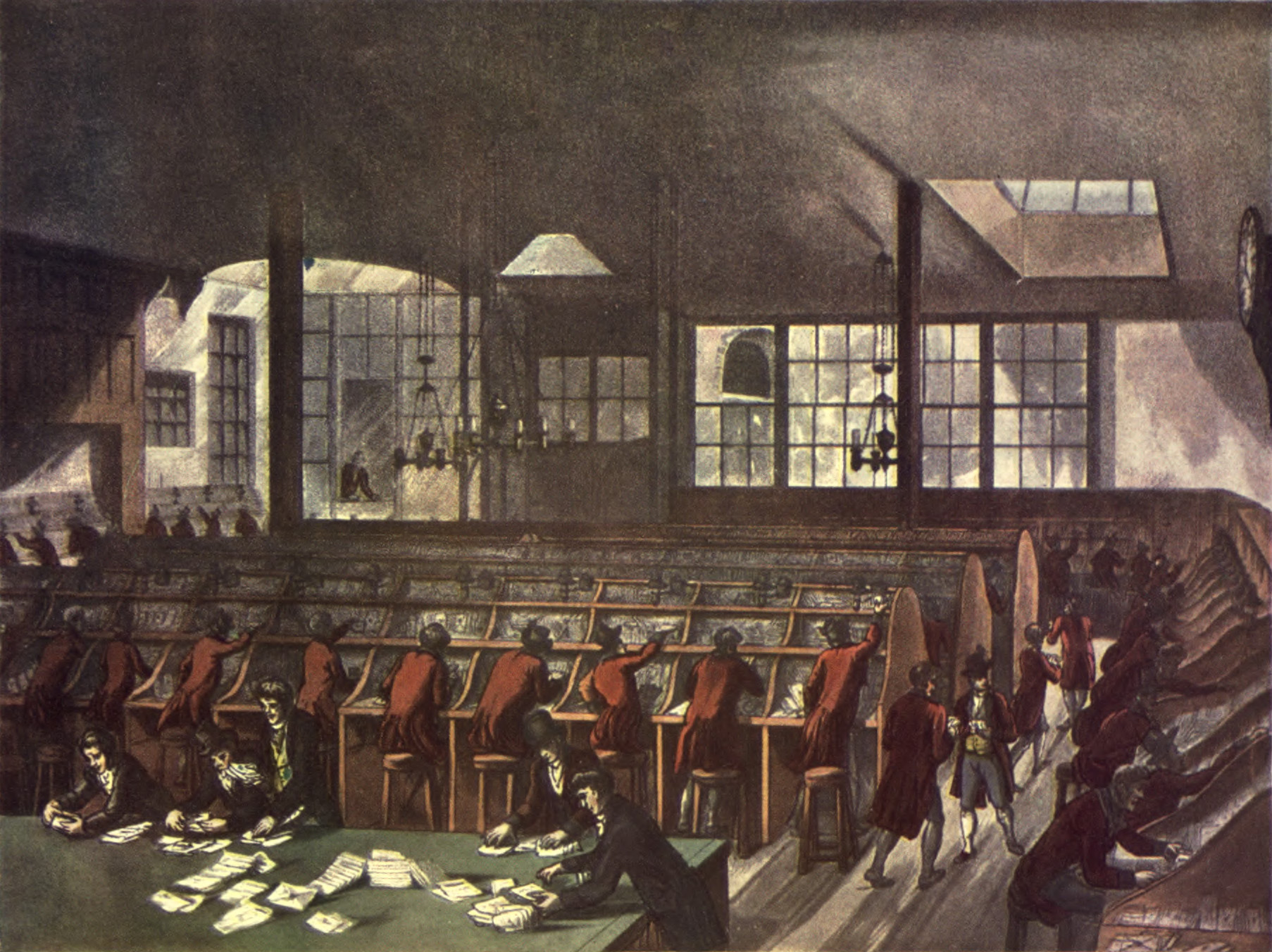
The old General Post Office on Lombard Street, London, in 1803

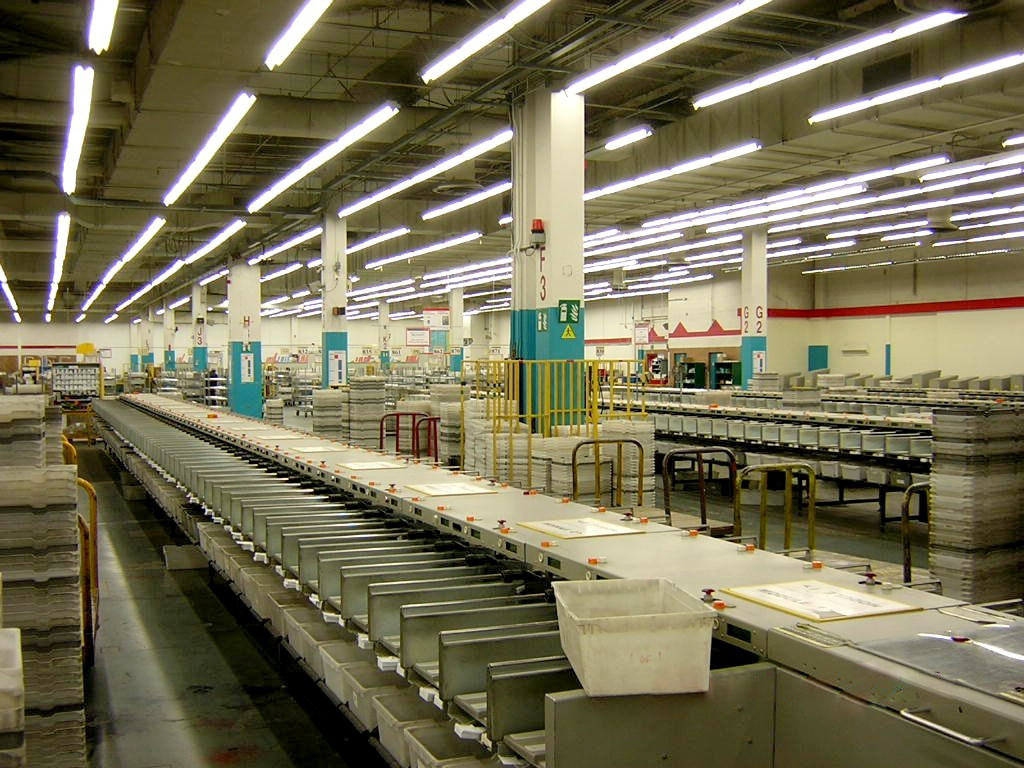
A Canadian sorting office in 2006

The term "post-office" has been in use since the 1650s, shortly after the legislation of private mail services in England in 1635. In early modern England, post riders—mounted couriers—were placed, or "posted", every few hours along post roads at posting houses (also known as post houses) between major cities, or "post towns". These stables or inns permitted important correspondence to travel without delay. In early America, post offices were also known as stations. This term, as well as the term "post house", fell from use as horse and coach services were replaced by railways, aircraft, and automobiles.

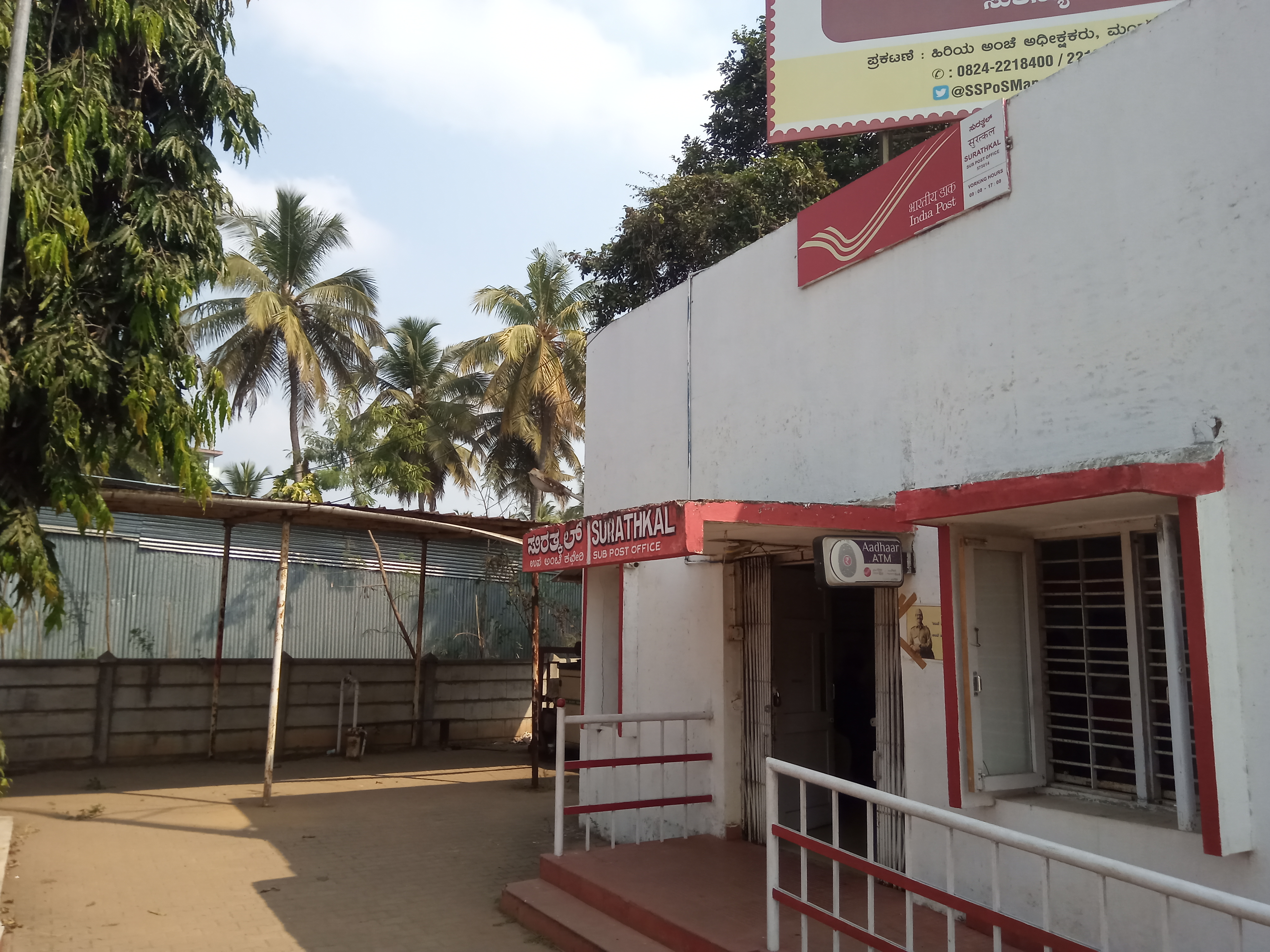
The Surathkal Post Office in Surathkal, India

The term "post office" usually refers to government postal facilities providing customer service. "General Post Office" is sometimes used for the national headquarters of a postal service, even if the building does not provide customer service. A postal facility that is used exclusively for processing mail is instead known as a sorting office or delivery office, which may have a large central area known as a sorting or postal hall. Integrated facilities combining mail processing with railway stations or airports are known as mail exchanges.

Private courier and delivery services often have offices as well, although these are usually not called "post offices", except in the case of Germany, which has fully privatised its national postal system.

As abbreviation PO is used, together with GPO for General Post Office and LPO for Licensed Post Office.

== History ==
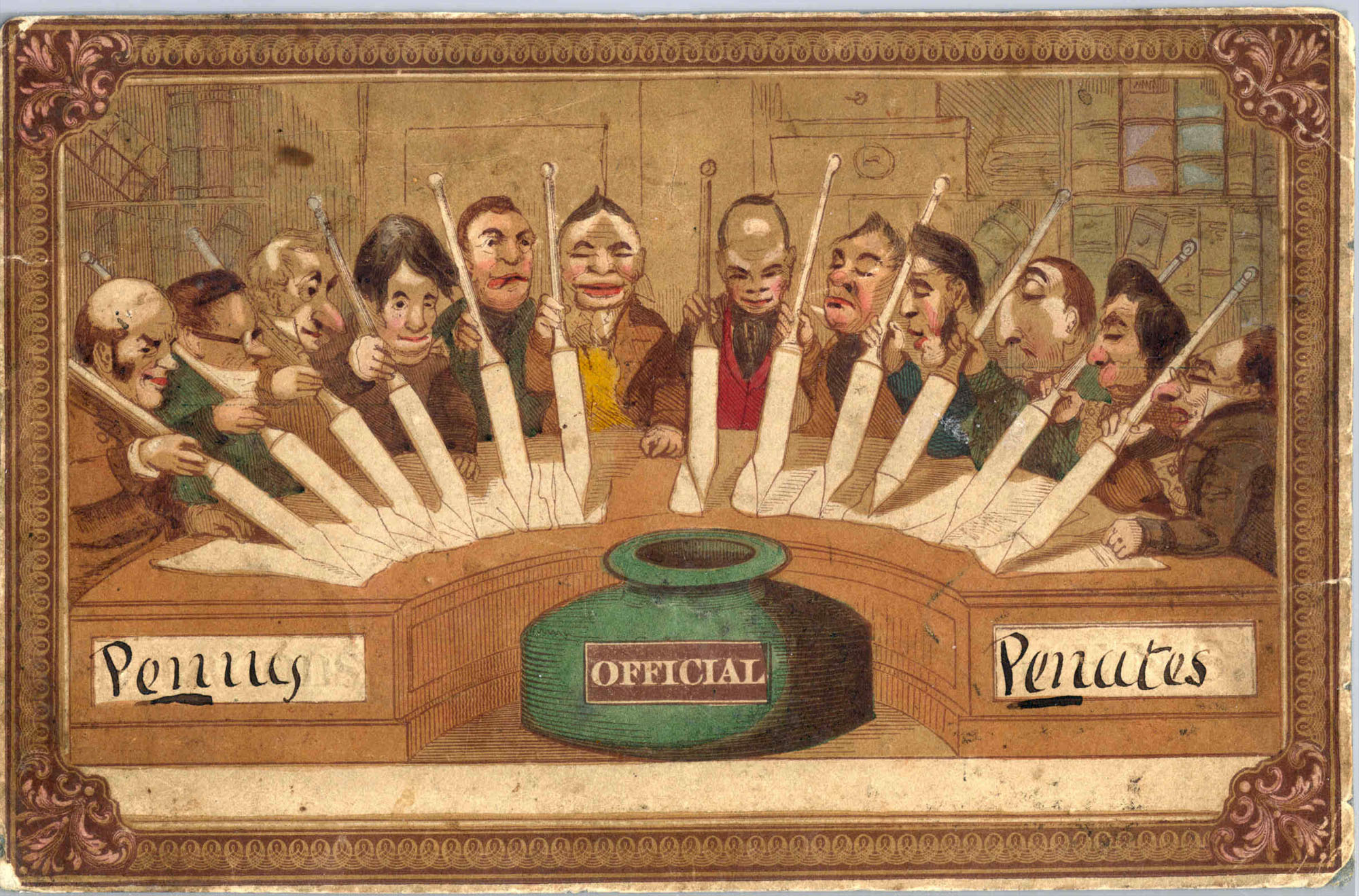
Postal clerks in an 1840 Penny Penates postcard

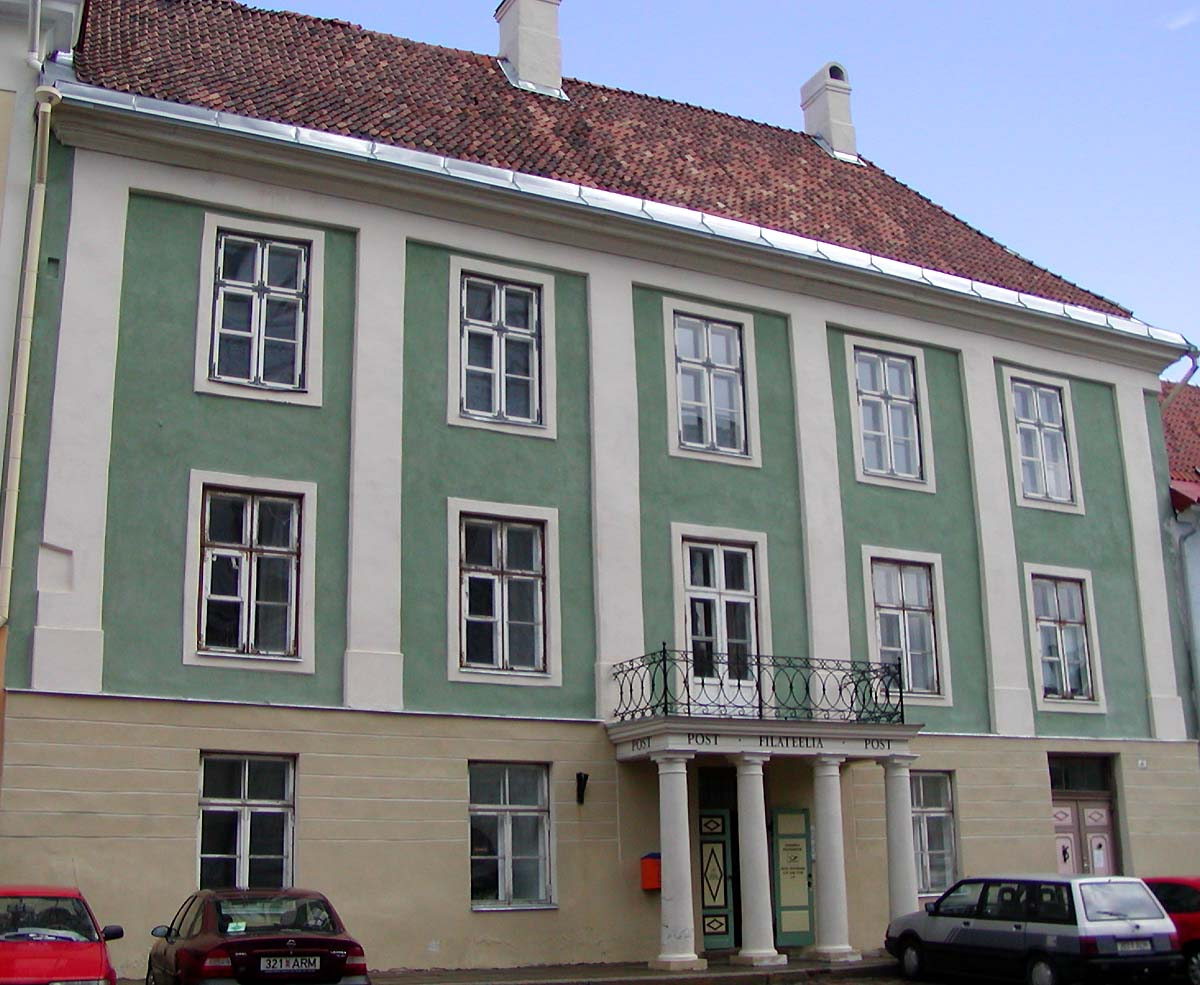
The Old Post Office in Toompea in Tallinn, Estonia

There is evidence of corps of royal couriers disseminating the decrees of Egyptian pharaohs as early as 2400 BCE, and it is possible that the service greatly precedes that date. Similarly, there may be ancient organised systems of post houses providing mounted courier service, although sources vary as to precisely who initiated the practice.

In the Persian Empire, a Chapar Khaneh system existed along the Royal Road. Similar postage systems were established in India and China by the Mauryan and Han dynasties in the 2nd century BCE.

The Roman historian Suetonius credited Augustus with regularizing the Roman transportation and courier network, the Cursus Publicus. Local officials were obliged to provide couriers who would be responsible for their message's entire course. Locally maintained post houses (Latin: stationes) privately owned rest houses (Latin: mansiones) and were obliged or honored to care for couriers along their way. The Roman emperor Diocletian later established two parallel systems: one providing fresh horses or mules for urgent correspondence and the other providing sturdy oxen for bulk shipments. The Byzantine historian Procopius, though not unbiased, records the Cursus Publicus system remained largely intact until it was dismantled in the Byzantine empire by the emperor Justinian in the 6th century.

The Princely House of Thurn and Taxis family initiated regular mail service from Brussels in the 16th century, directing the Imperial Post of the Holy Roman Empire. The British Postal Museum claims that the oldest functioning post office in the world is on High Street in Sanquhar, Scotland. The post office has functioned continuously since 1712, during which horses and stagecoaches were used to carry mail.

Rural parts of Canada in the 19th century utilized the way office system. Villagers could leave their letters at the way office which were then taken to the nearest post office, as well as pick up their mail from the way office.

In parts of Europe, special postal censorship offices existed to intercept and censor mail. In France, such offices were known as cabinets noirs.

== Unstaffed postal facilities ==
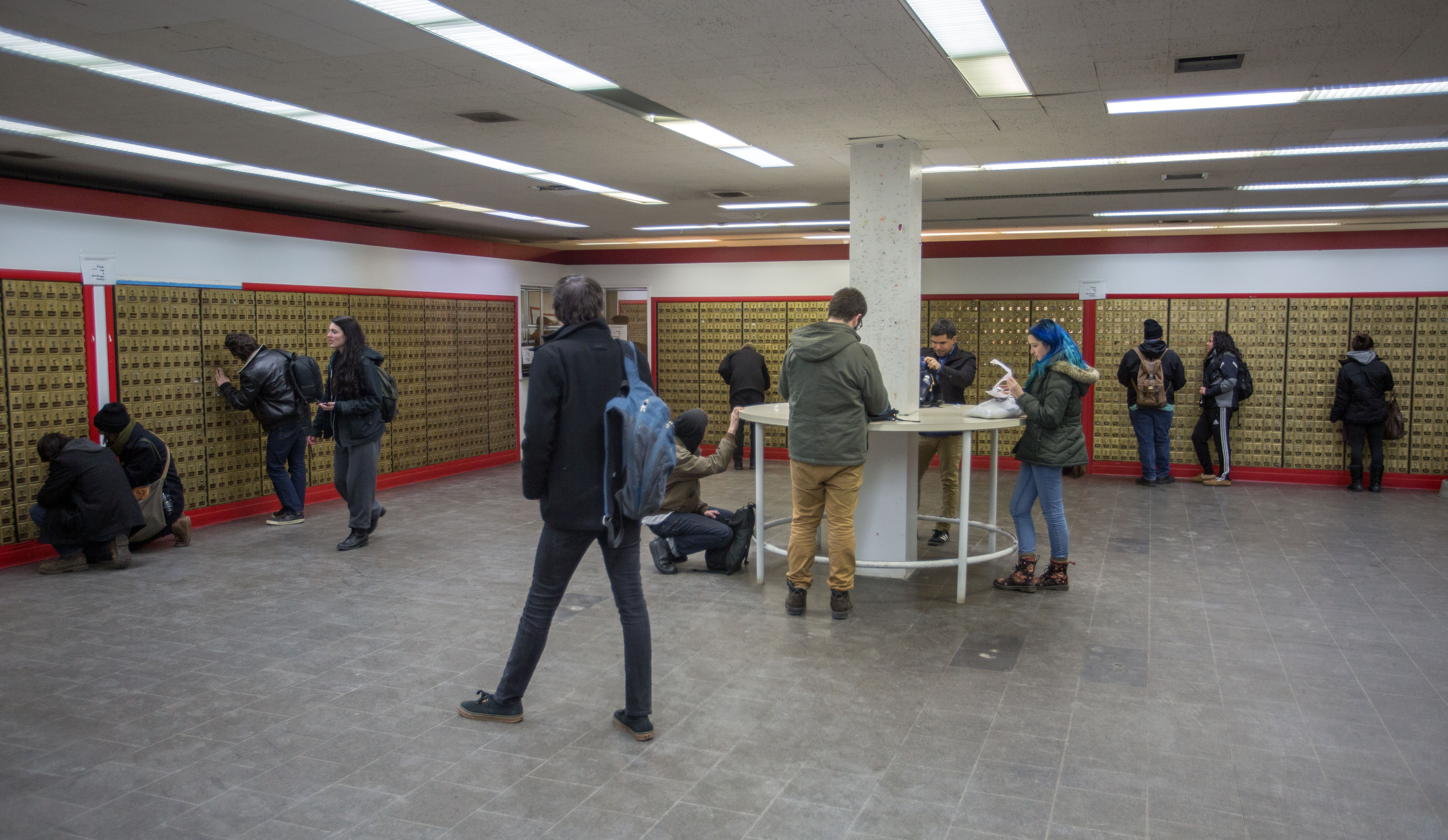
Students attend an unstaffed postal facility

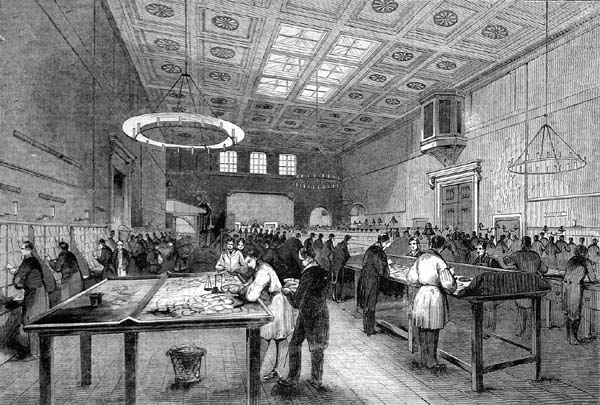
The Inland Letter Office of the GPO in London in 1844

In many jurisdictions, mailboxes and post office boxes have long been in widespread use for drop-off and pickup (respectively) of mail and small packages outside post offices or when offices are closed. Germany's national postage system Deutsche Post introduced the Pack-Station for package delivery, including both drop-off and pickup, in 2001. In the 2000s, the United States Postal Service began to install Automated Postal Centers (APCs) in many locations in both post offices, for when they are closed or busy, and retail locations. APCs can print postage and accept mail and small packages.

== Notable post offices ==
=== Operational ===
- General Post Office, state postal system and telecommunications carrier of the United Kingdom until 1969
- General Post Office in Dublin (inaugurated 1818), headquarters of the An post and headquarters of the 1916 Easter Uprising
- General Post Office (1864), erected on the site of the Black Hole of Calcutta
- General Post Office (1874) in Chennai, India
- General Post Office (1887) in Lahore, Pakistan
- General Post Office (1895), the headquarters of the Sri Lankan Post
- General Post Office (1903), headquarters of the Croatian post
- General Post Office (1976), the headquarters of Hongkong Post
- General Post Office (1913), the main post office of Mumbai, India, and one of the world's largest (120,000 sq ft or 11,000 m^{2})
- General Post Office Building (1922), former headquarters of the Chunghwa Post and present home of the Shanghai Postal Museum
- Central Post Office (1939), also temporary home to the Privy Council of Canada
- Manila Central Post Office (1926, rebuilt after WWII)
- James Farley Post Office (1912), America's largest operating post office, the main office for New York City. Bears the famous translation of Herodotus's description of the Persian postal system along its front facade: "Neither snow nor rain nor heat nor gloom of night stays these couriers from the swift completion of their appointed rounds"
- The Edificio Central de Correos y Telégrafos building (1917), San José, Costa Rica. Contains the Costa Rican Philatelic Museum on the second floor
- Polish Post Office, a scene of intense fighting during the 1939 Nazi Germany invasion of Danzig
- Taipei Post Office (1928), the headquarters of Chunghwa Post
- First Toronto Post Office (1833)
- Istanbul Main Post Office (1905), home of the Istanbul Postal Museum

=== Former ===
- Bandinelli Palace (1589), a former post office in Lviv in Ukraine
- General Post Office (1842), Washington, D.C.'s first all-marble building, patterned after Rome's Temple of Jupiter and now the Hotel Monaco, a four-star hotel
- Chief Post Office (1877), the former chief post office of New Zealand in Christchurch
- Central Post Office Building (1903), home of the Government of Sweden
- Buenos Aires Central Post Office (1908), now the Bicentennial Cultural Center
- The Fullerton (1919), a 5-star hotel in Singapore
- Magna Plaza, a shopping center at Amsterdam
- Old Main Post Office (1921), an enormous mixed use structure in Chicago
- Palazzo Delle Poste (1928), the former post office of Naples, Italy, heavily damaged during Naples' 1943 uprising against the Nazis
- Utrecht Post Office, since 2020 a large public library at Utrecht, Netherlands

=== Historic ===
- The General Post Office East (1825), former headquarters of the GPO in London, demolished in 1912
- John, Richard R. Private Enterprise, Public Good? University Of Carolina, 1839-1851.

== See also ==
- Extraterritorial Office of Exchange
- Postage stamp
- Dak bungalows, the former posthouses of the British Raj
- Freepost (also known as Business Reply Mail)
- "Going postal"
- Mail
- Military mail
- Old U.S. Post Offices
- Penny Post
- Post office box
- Postal administration
- Postal code, ZIP code
- History of United States postage rates
- Poste restante (also known as General Delivery)
- Universal Postal Union
- Wanted poster (Post Office Wall)
- Missing Post Office
- John, Richard R. Private Enterprise, Public Good? University Of Carolina, 1839-1851.
