= General Post Office, Chennai =

Post office building in India

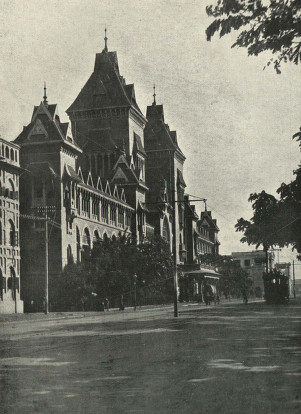
- Chennai General Post Office, c. 1905

General information
- Architectural style: Indo-Saracenic
- Location: Rajaji Salai, Parry's Corner, Chennai, India
- Coordinates: 13°5′34″N 80°17′28″E
- Construction started: 1874
- Inaugurated: 1884
- Cost: ₹ 680,000
- Client: General Post Office

Height
- Height: 125 feet (38 m)

Dimensions
- Other dimensions: 352 feet (107 m) long, 162 feet (49 m) broad

Technical details
- Floor count: 3
- Floor area: 55,000 square feet (5,100 m^{2})

Design and construction
- Architect: Robert Chisholm

Website
- www.chennaipost.gov.in/chennaigpo.aspx

Chennai General Post Office (GPO) is located on Rajaji Salai at Parry's Corner, Chennai. It functions in a building built in 1884. It is located opposite to the Chennai Beach suburban railway station. Chennai GPO covers an area of about 23.33 km^{2} (9.01 sq mi) and serves a population of around 220,000. It has no sub-branch offices.

== History ==
In 1712, Governor Harrison (1711–1717) first started a Company Postal Service in Madras to carry mail to Bengal by dak runner. By 1736, a postal system of sorts was in place with a somewhat greater vision. In 1774, a system of charging postage on private letters began. In 1785 and 1786, civilians John Philip Burlton and Thomas Lewin of the East India Company, respectively, suggested to the Governor of Madras that it was necessary to lay down postal rules, draw up a postal network and establish a postal authority. This warranted establishing a post office in Fort St. George so that the letters of the staff of the company, which were carried free at the expense of the government until then, could be charged for. Accepting this suggestion, the first Madras Post Office with fixed postal charges—the Madras GPO—was established by Governor Sir Archibald Campbell (1786–1790), who also established the Male and Female Orphan Asylums (that developed as St. George's School), and the postal service was thus made a government facility.

Chennai General Post Office was initially opened in Fort St. George Square, just outside the Sea Gate, on 1 June 1786. The first Postmaster-General was Sir Archibald's secretary, A. M. Campbell. Robert Mitford was appointed the Deputy Postmaster-General. The GPO was served by one writer (clerk), five sorters, a head peon and ten postmen. Later, the company overruled Campbell's appointment and, eventually, Oliver Colt was appointed the first Postmaster-General of Madras.

To expand its services, the Madras Post Office, as it was generally called, opened a couple of receiving offices (as opposed to full service offices that also delivered mail) in March 1834, one at Hunter's Road in Vepery and another in Royapettah on what is now known as Westcott Road. In October 1837, the post office moved to "the old Bank" building inside the Fort, what is now the Fort Museum. In February 1845, four more receiving offices were opened, one each on Mount Road and in Triplicane and two in Black Town (as George Town was known then). In 1854, a Post Office Act came into force, an organised postal system was established and stamps were first introduced. In 1855, two more receiving offices were opened in San Thomé and Teynampet, near St. George's Cathedral. The same year, the first letter-box had appeared in the city at Moubray's Road. Soon, six more receiving offices were opened across the town. In 1856, the Madras Post Office moved to Garden House, Popham's Broadway, near the Kothawal Chavadi market.

The postal service grew when railway connections were established with the other Presidencies in 1871. By 1874, there were nine post offices in the city. The internal carriage of mail in Madras was by horse cart (jutkas) till 1918, though a beginning with motorised transport was made in 1915. The telegraph came to Madras in 1853 but was made available to the public only from 1 February 1855, when 41 offices covering a distance of 3,000 miles could be reached.

These expansions warranted a large central post office for receipt of mail and distribution. In 1868, the Madras Chamber of Commerce urged the Governments of India and Madras to build a large General Post Office in a central place. However, owing to the construction of GOPs in Calcutta and Bombay, both Government of India and Government of Madras were able to sanction only ₹ 200,000 for this purpose. In 1873, the present site, where the Abercrombie Battery had once stood, was selected and the construction started in 1874, but there was a lack of funds to proceed with the work till 1880. The site was initially intended to be divided between the Bank of Madras and the Post Office. However, the Chamber urged that both the post and telegraph departments be housed in one building, which necessitated an even bigger building, and the governments decided not to divide the land and allotted the whole to the new post office.

With the completion of the new building in the Indo-Saracenic style, the Madras Post Office moved into the present building in April 1884, which is its own, designed by British architect Robert Chisholm. The Postmaster-General shifted on 1 March 1884 from the place he was occupying in the Mercantile Bank building further down the road, and the Broadway staff shifted on 26 April, the same year. The new building had cost ₹ 680,000 against an estimated ₹ 692,000, a considerable part of it contributed by the Madras Chamber of Commerce. The Presidency Postmaster was given residential accommodation on the second floor.

By the early 1990s, the post office was filled to capacity and the search for a new building started. However, the idea was abandoned due to opposition from the Madras Chamber of Commerce, and the post office continued to function from the old building.

== The building ==
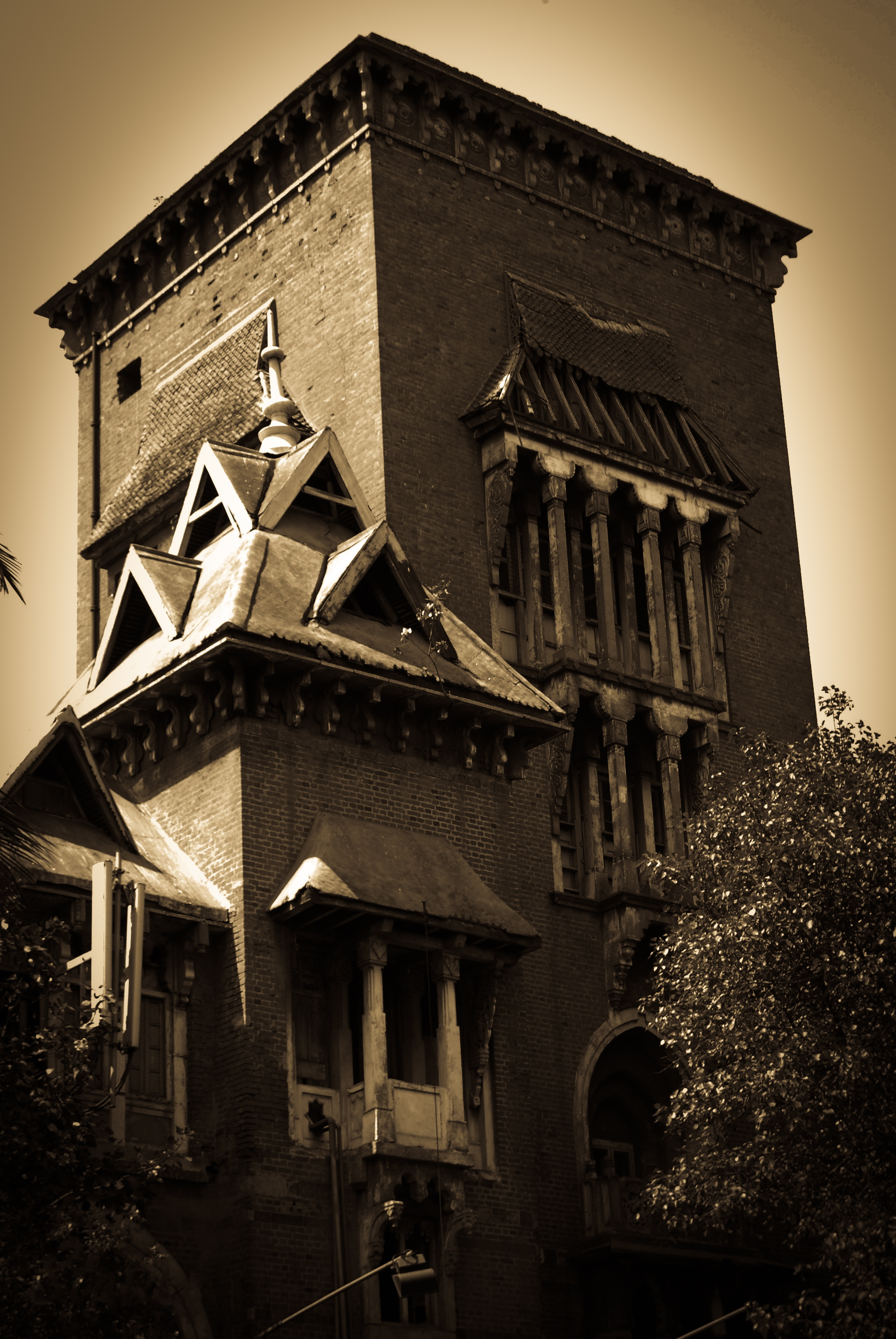
One of the ornamental towers in the building

The Chennai GPO building can be described as a red-painted Victorian County-Colonial or Victorian Gothic-Colonial overlay on Indo-Saracenic design. It is a three-storied building, 352 ft long and 162 ft wide, with 125-ft tall twin towers. The building is spread over an area of 6,085.30 square meters (66,000 square feet). The twin towers, when built, sported the Kerala roof-influenced "caps" atop as favoured by Chisholm, influenced by his building assignments in Travancore. However, a storm in the mid-20th century removed these crowns. Besides a high-ceilinged central hall, the ground floor provided space for stores, kitchen, servants, and so on. The first floor was used for offices and the second floor served as accommodation for officers. The building also had a unique exhaust facility meant to absorb the stink from the open drainage.

== Functioning ==
The Chennai GPO is the primary post office of South India and has the Postal Index Number (PIN) 600 001. The GPO handles most of the city's inbound and outbound mail and parcels. Chennai GPO operates from 8:00 am to 8:30 pm from Monday to Saturday. On Sundays, the GPO functions from 10:00 am to 5:00 pm. Facilities available are speed post, registered post, parcel, insurance, e-billing, and e-posting. Chennai GPO has a 24-hour telegraph office.

Chennai GPO is one of the five Philatelic Bureaus in the country (others being Mumbai GPO, Kolkata GPO, Parliament Street, and New Delhi GPO) that are authorised to sell the United Nations stamps.

== Incidents ==
On 23 October 2000, a fire gutted the building after which a major restoration was undertaken by the government. About 15,000 sq ft of the total 67,000 sq ft of built-up area was extensively damaged due to the fire, which included areas with the public counters, the main hall and the delivery hall, the savings bank halls and the foreign post department. The restoration cost ₹ 36 million and was completed in 2005. On 26 November 2005, the first two floors were opened after renovation.

In 2011, a portion of the roof on the second floor of the GPO building collapsed due to monsoon rain. One of the domes atop the building, which was in a dilapidated condition due to heavy rains in the past, collapsed. However, nobody was reportedly injured.

On 8 May 2019, a portion of tiles on the second floor of the post office building collapsed and fell inside the unused portion of the building. No one was injured in the incident.

== Major Initiatives ==
Chennai GPO launched a financial inclusion drive to provide post office Saving account to the poor of the poorest at cost of ₹50 linked with mobile and aadhaar. The account was also secured under PMSBY. A drive was launched by Chennai GPO to popularize postal service's among masses. Post office Saving Accounts were provided to the unbanked marginalized people of Chennai. Special drive for Fisherman known as "Sagar " was launched by Chennai GPO under the leadership of Alok Ojha to provide Insurance cover to Fisherman. A special help desk has been created in Chennai GPO for supporting the transgender community. An aadhaar enrollment centre has also been started in Chennai GPO to help transgender people and other marginalized sections of society.

== Restoration ==
In 2018, the Department of Posts began the process of restoring the heritage structure. As the first step, an amount of ₹ 1.5 million has been sanctioned for detailed project report.

== See also ==
- Architecture of Chennai
- Heritage structures in Chennai
- Indian Postal Service
- General Post Office, Kolkata
- General Post Office, Mumbai
- General Post Office, New Delhi
- General Post Office, Old Delhi
