= General Post Office, Kolkata =

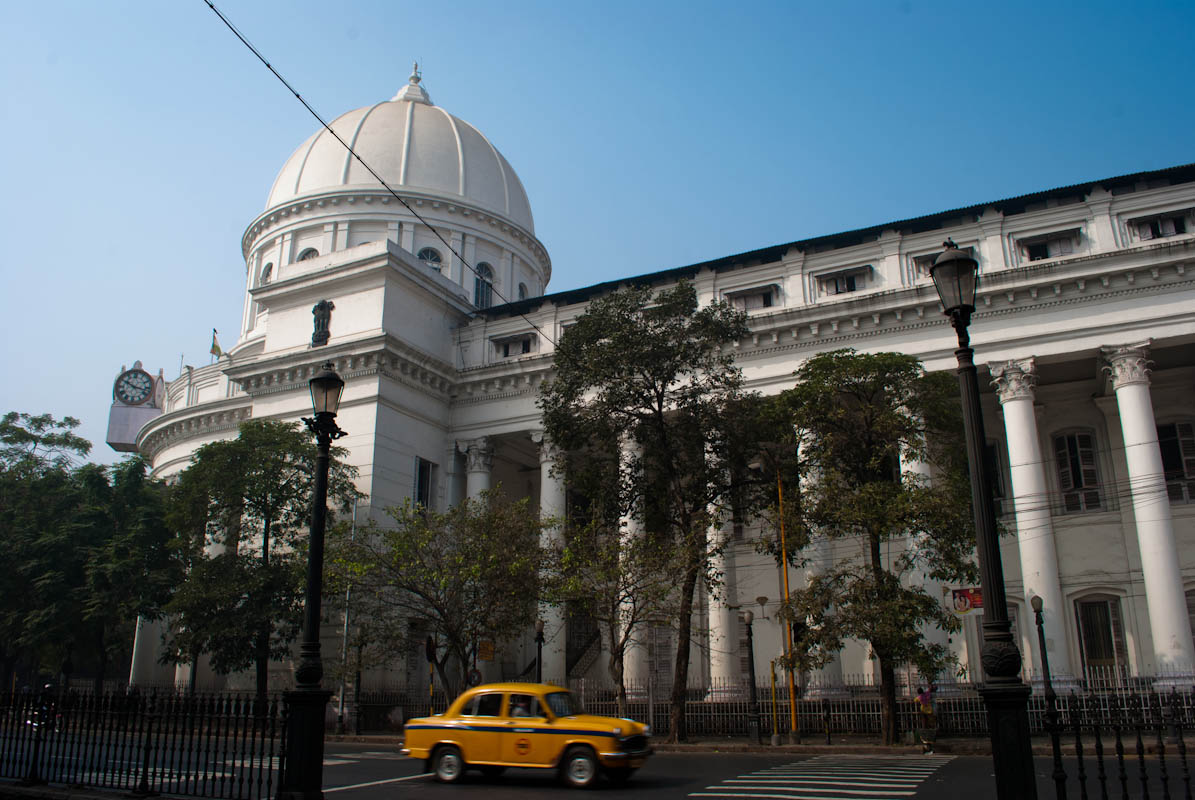
- The GPO building in December 2011
- Interactive map of the General Post Office, Kolkata area

General information
- Location: Kolkata, India
- Coordinates: 22°34′23.01″N 88°20′44.09″E
- Construction started: 1864
- Completed: 1868

Design and construction
- Architect: Walter B. Grenville

Website
- westbengalpost.gov.in

The General Post Office, Kolkata is the central post office of the city of Kolkata, India, and the biggest post office of West Bengal. This post office was the first post office of India since 1727. The post office handles most of the city's inbound and outbound mail and parcels. Situated in the B. B. D. Bagh area, the imposing structure of the GPO is one of the landmarks in the city.

Kolkata GPO is one of the five Philatelic Bureaus in the country (others being Mumbai GPO, Chennai GPO, Parliament Street, and New Delhi GPO) that are authorised to sell the United Nations stamps.

== History ==
The site where the GPO is located was actually the site of the first Fort William. An alley beside the post office was the site of the guardhouse that housed the infamous 1756 Black Hole of Calcutta (1756). The General Post Office was designed in 1864 by Walter B. Grenville (1819-1874), who acted as consulting architect to the government of India from 1863 to 1868. The staircase at the eastern side of the GPO features a brass plate, which marks the eastern end of the Old Fort William. This is probably the only remaining of the ancient fort of Calcutta. Recently a marble plaque has been installed on the Eastern walls of GPO, which highlight the Brass Plate. To the north of the GPO is the Kolkata Collectorate, which was once the office of the regional ‘Collector’, a designation invented by the British Government after 1857 to replace the traditional Zamindars.

== Building ==
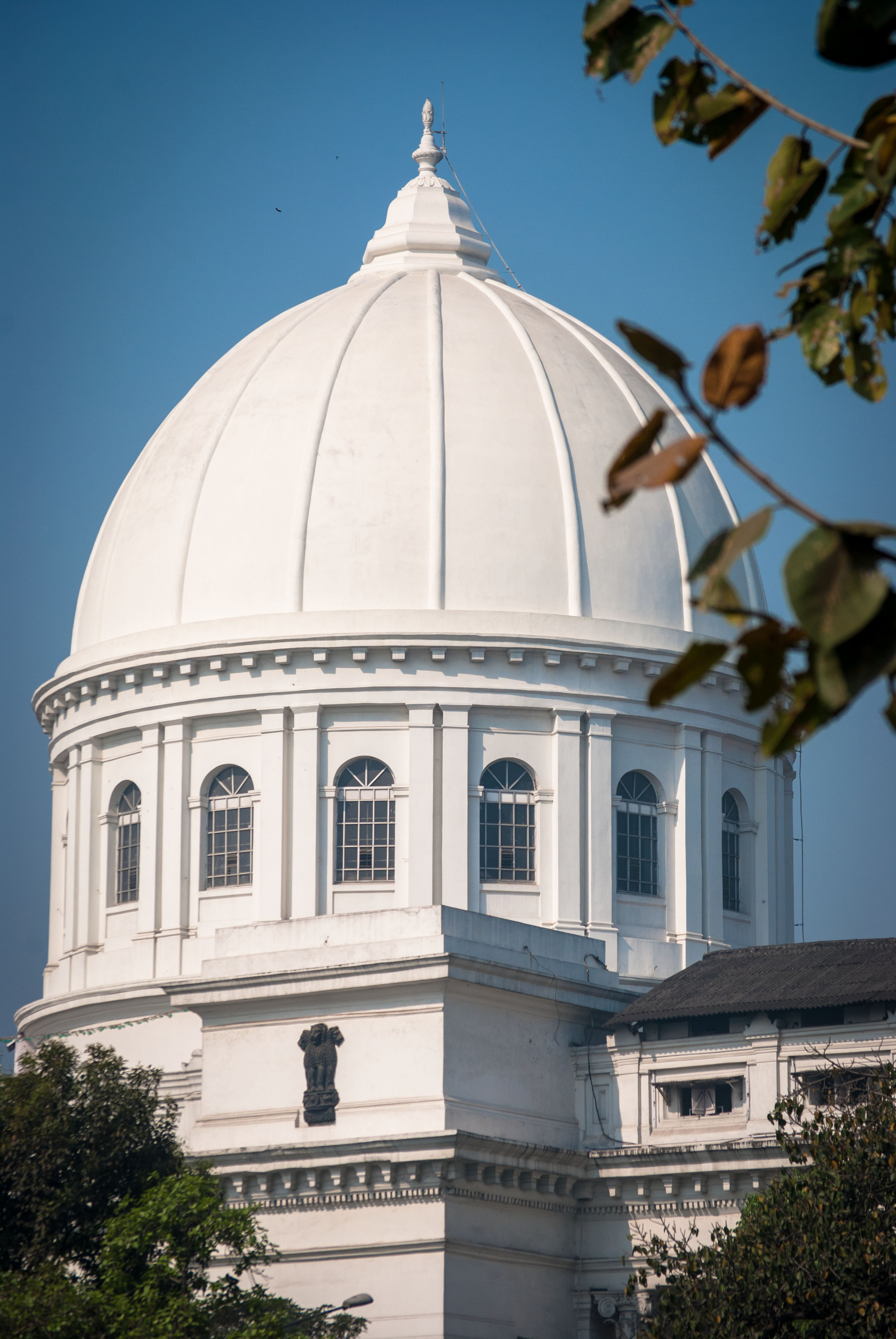
Dome of the General Post Office

The GPO is notable for its imposing high domed roof (rising over 220 feet) and tall Ionic-Corinthian pillars. A postal museum that was built in 1884 displays a collection of artefacts and stamps. The Philatelic Bureau is located on the southwestern end of the building.

In June 2022, Kolkata GPO became the first Indian post office to host an in‑house café. "Parcel Café" (branded Shiuli) occupies the east wing lounge, serving light refreshments amid colonial décor

== Location ==
It is located on Netaji Subhas Road in B. B. D. Bagh area of Kolkata. The location is near the BBD Bagh Railway Station.

== Gallery ==
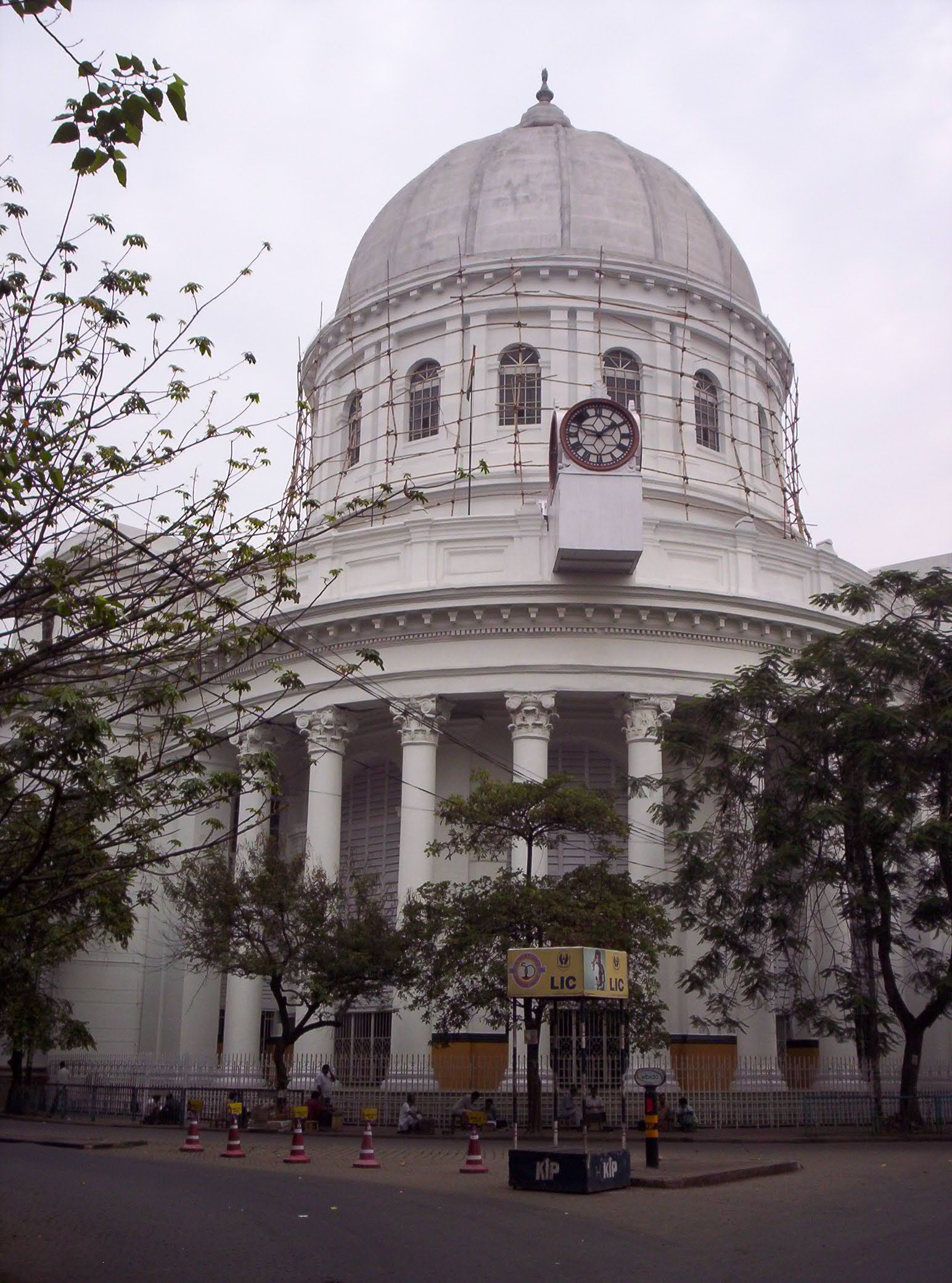
Kolkata GPO with some ongoing restoration work

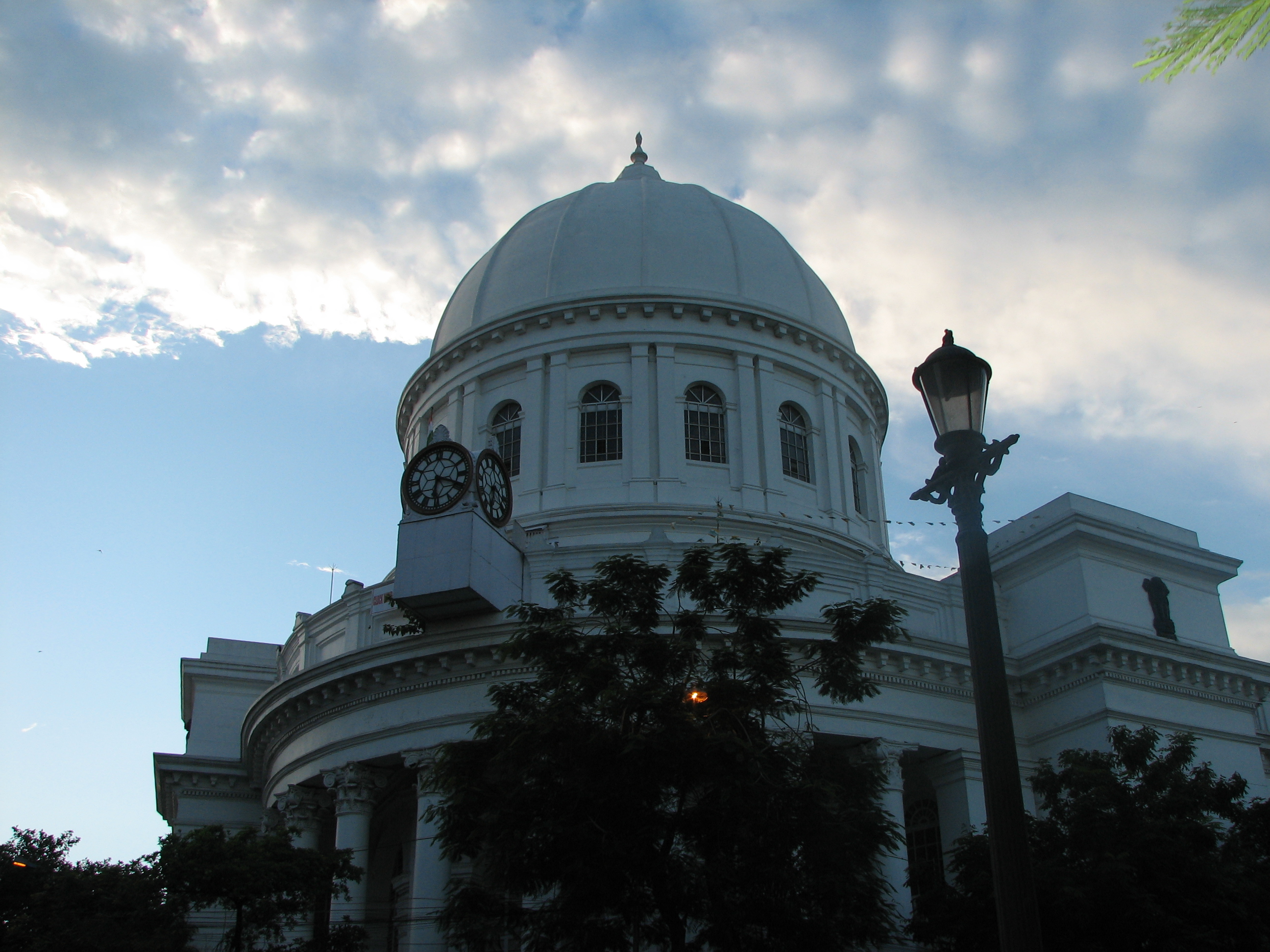
Kolkata GPO Dusk View

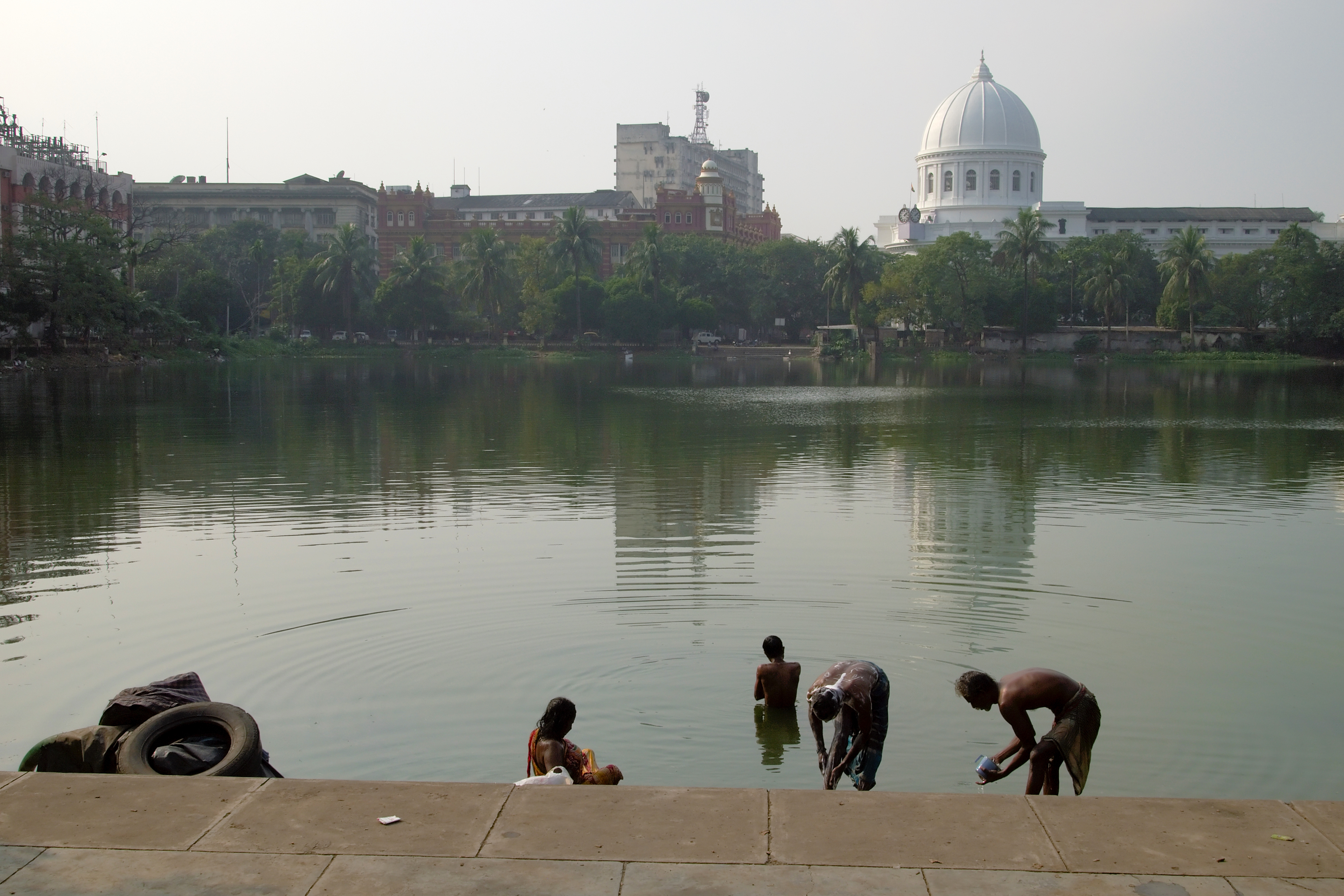
Remote view from Lal Dighi

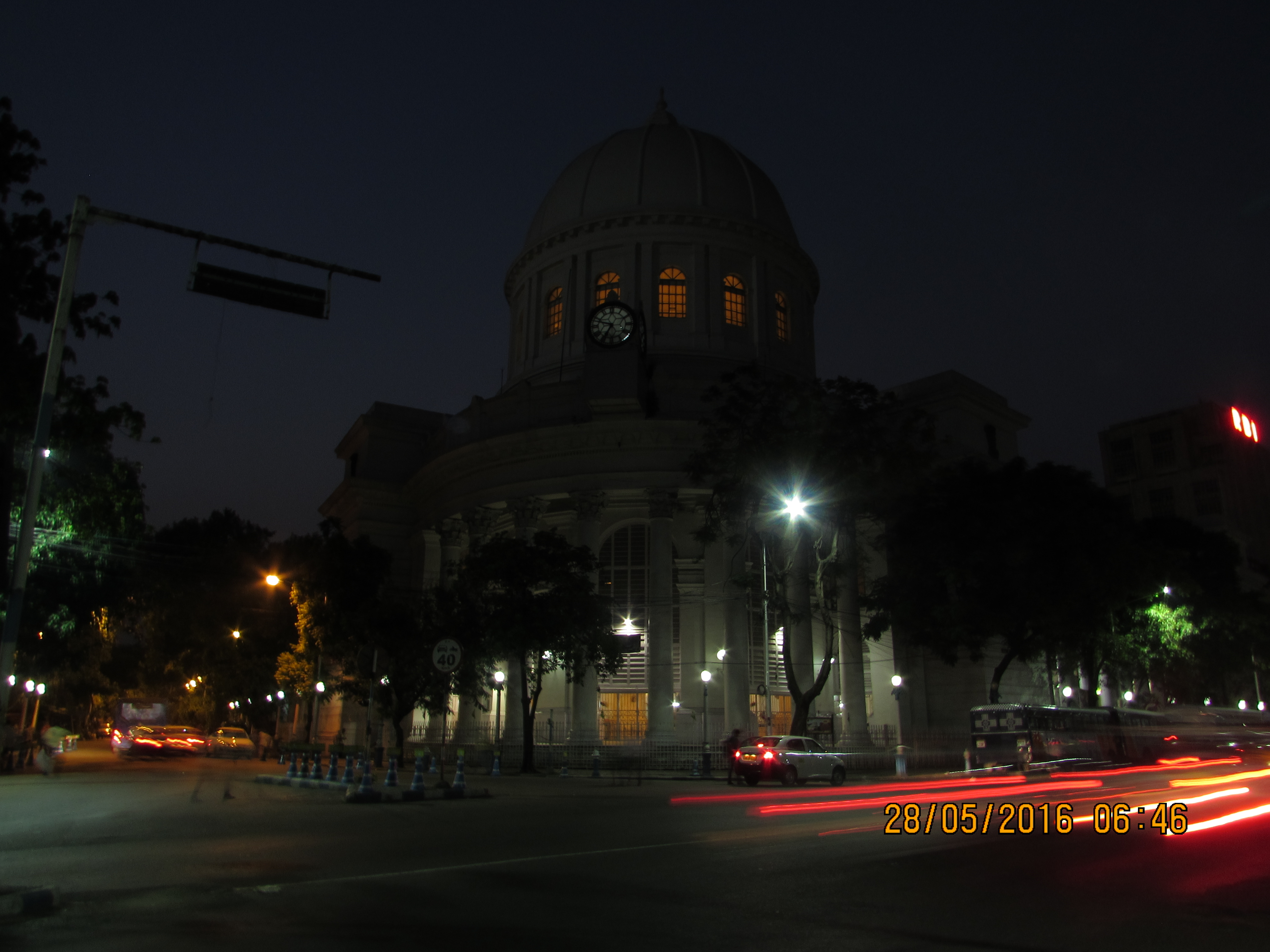
Kolkata GPO Night View

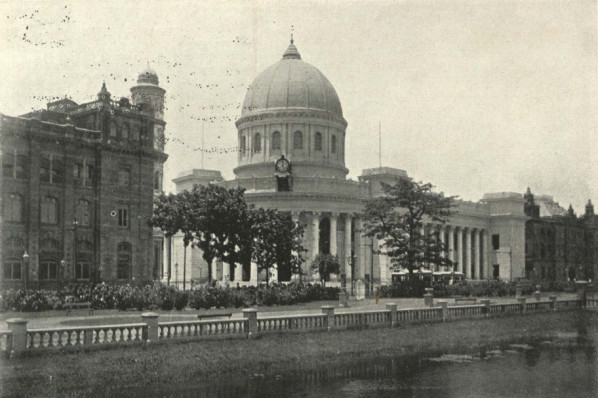
General Post Office, Calcutta (1905)

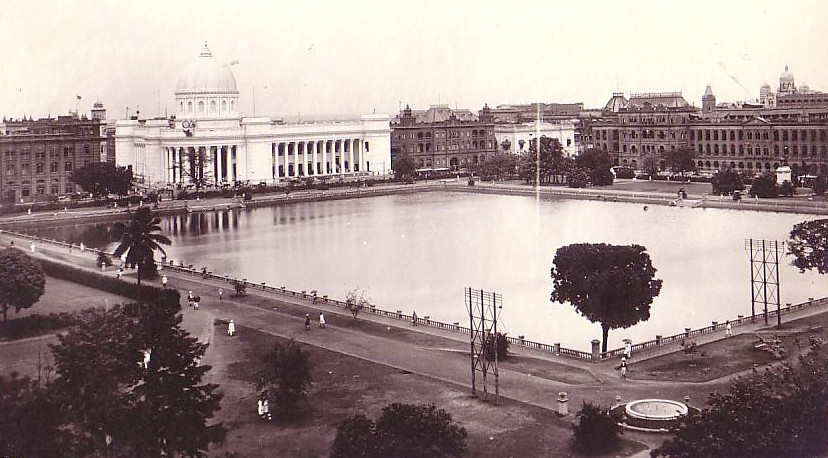
Dalhousie Square, Calcutta in 1910 with GPO in the background

== See also ==
- Indian Postal Service
- General Post Office, Chennai
- General Post Office, Mumbai
- General Post Office, New Delhi
- General Post Office, Old Delhi
