= Grandpré =

Grandpré or de Grandpré is a French surname. French (Grandpré): topographic name for someone who lived near a large meadow, from French grand 'large' + pré 'meadow', or a habitational name from Grandpré or Grand Pré, names of several places in various parts of France, named with these words.

- A. Jean de Grandpré (1921-2022), Canadian lawyer and businessman
- Gisèle Grandpré (1912–2002), French actress
- Louis de Grandpré (1761-1846), French naval officer
- Louis-Philippe de Grandpré (1917-2008), Canadian lawyer
- Mary GrandPré (born 1954), American illustrator

== See also ==
- Grand-Pré (disambiguation)
