= B. B. D. Bagh =

B.B.D. Bagh
- Neighborhood of Kolkata
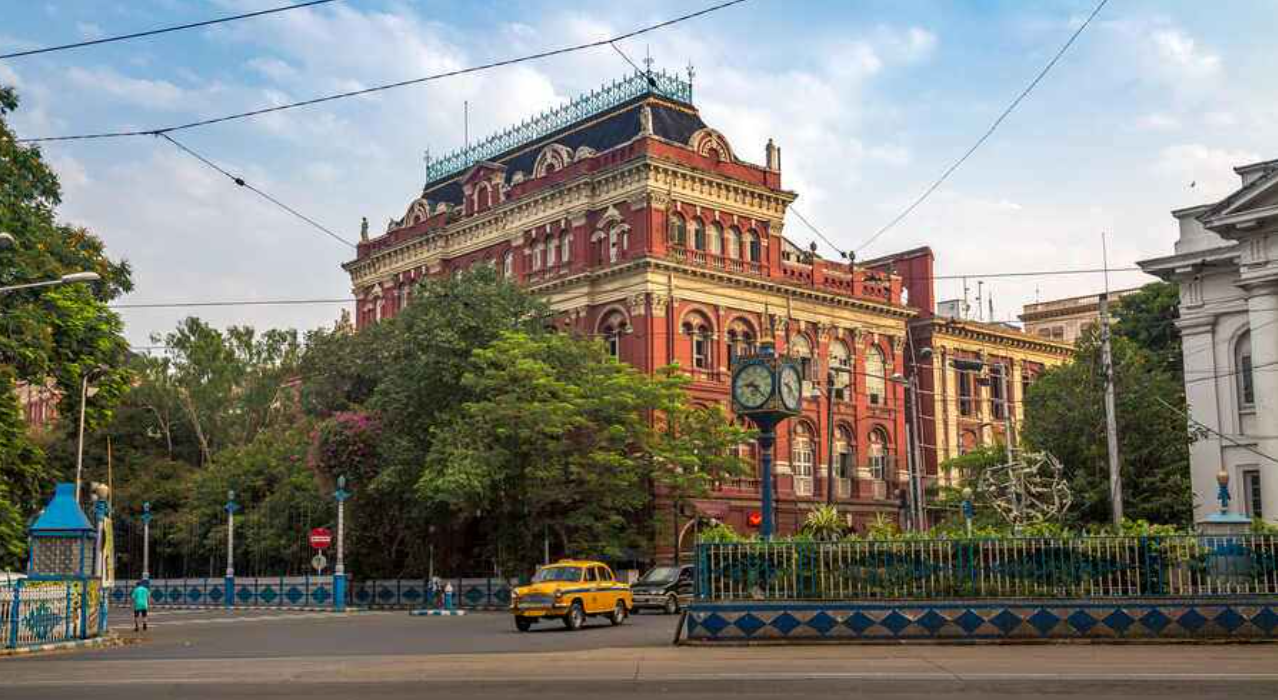
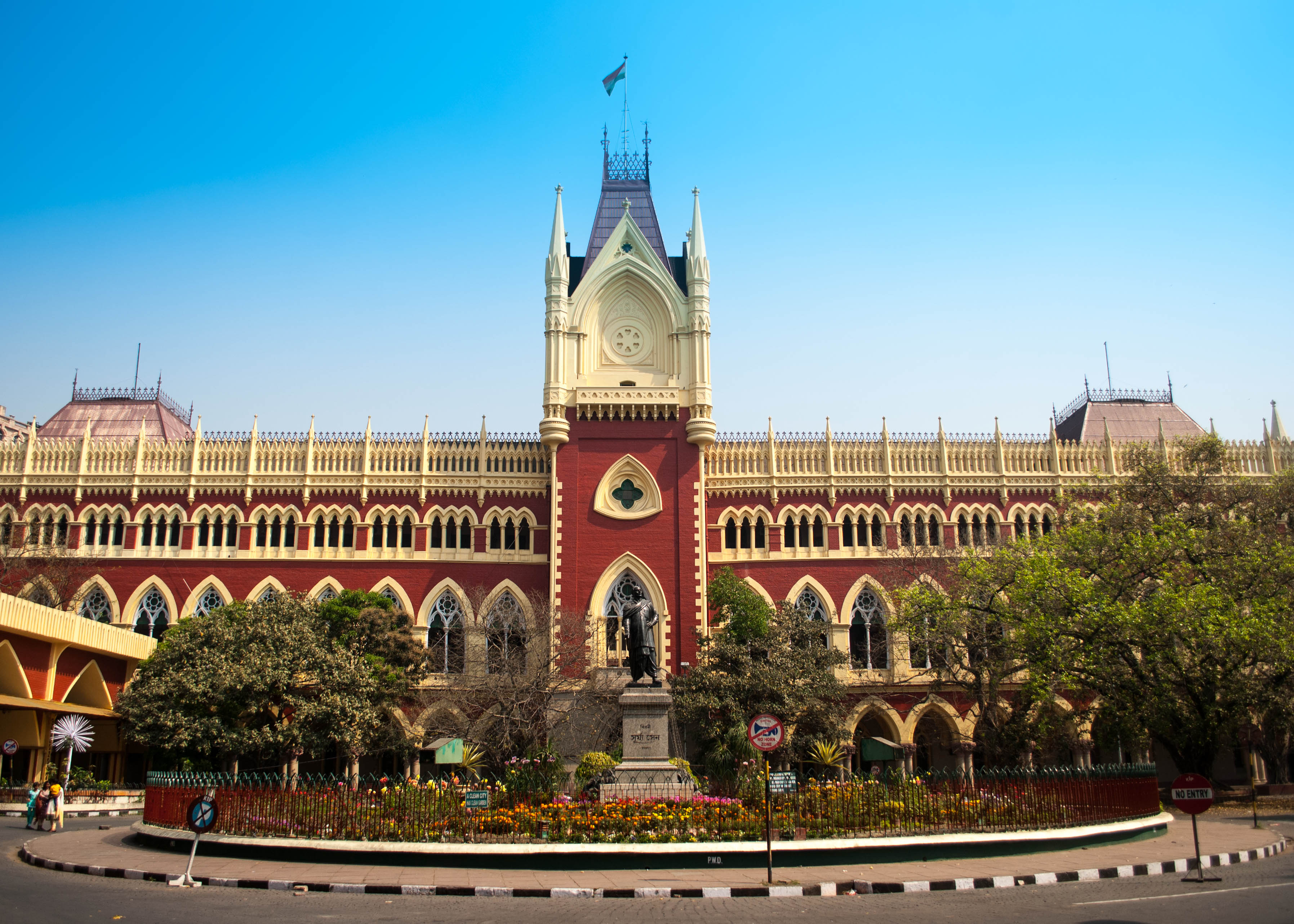
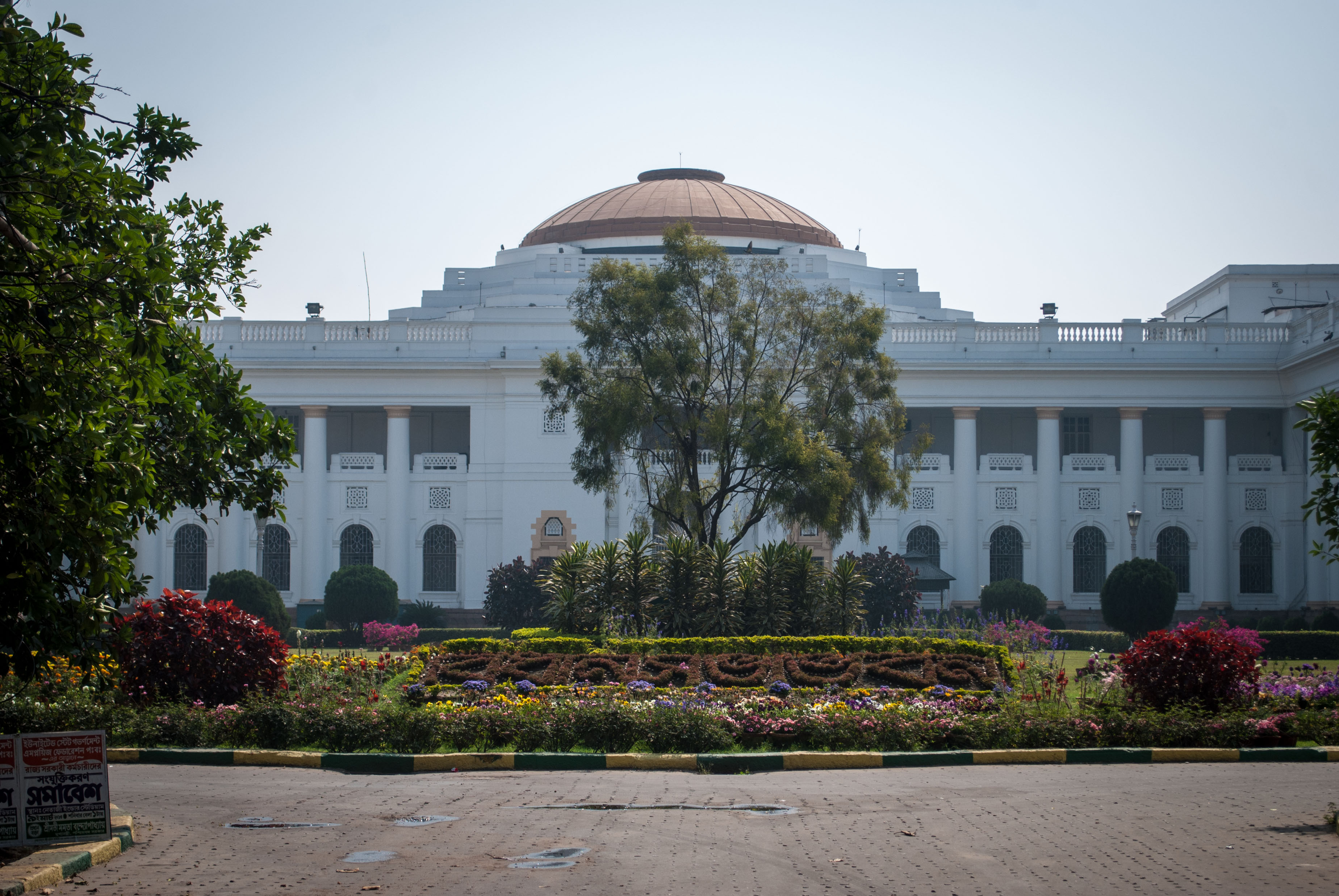
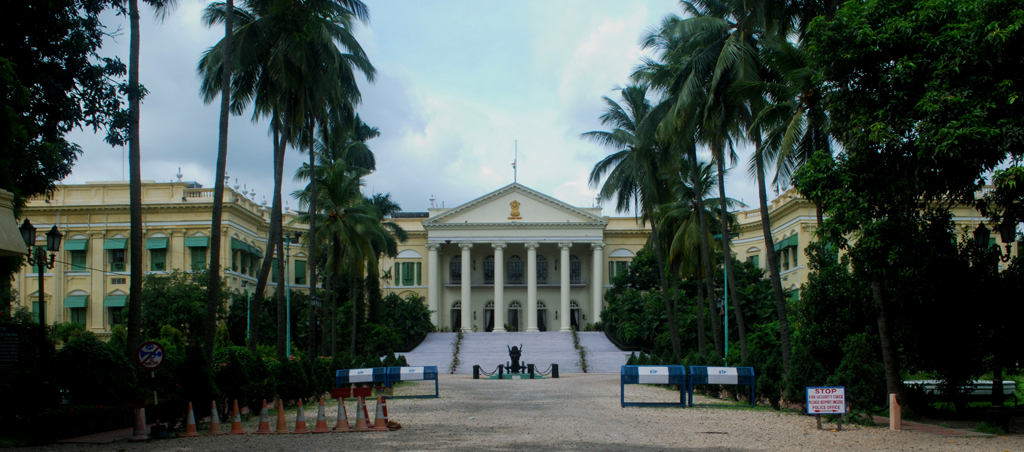
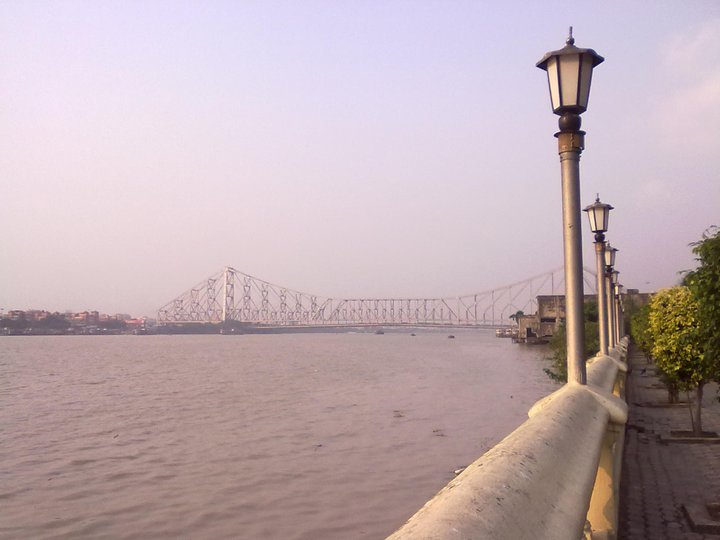
- Writer's Building Calcutta High Court Vidhan Sabha Bhavan Raj Bhavan View of Howrah Bridge from Millennium Park in B.B.D. Bagh

- Location in Kolkata
- Coordinates: 22.572°N 88.349°E
- Country: India
- State: West Bengal
- City: Kolkata
- District: Kolkata
- Metro Station: Mahakaran
- Kolkata Circular Railway: B.B.D. Bagh
- Municipal Corporation: Kolkata Municipal Corporation
- KMC ward: 45, 46
- Elevation: 36 ft (11 m)

Population
  - Total: For population see linked KMC ward pages
- Time zone: UTC+5:30 (IST)
- PIN: 700001, 700062
- Area code: +91 33
- Lok Sabha constituency: Kolkata Uttar
- Vidhan Sabha constituency: Chowranghee

Binoy-Badal-Dinesh Bagh, shortened as B. B. D. Bagh, formerly called Tank Square and then Dalhousie Square (1847 to 1856), is the administrative, financial and commercial region and one of the central business districts of Kolkata (Calcutta), capital of the Indian state of West Bengal. It is the seat of Government of West Bengal and houses all three branches of it. The area consists Writers' Building, the official state secretariat building, Raj Bhavan, the residence of Governor of West Bengal, Vidhan Sabha Bhavan, the building housing the West Bengal Legislative Assembly and also the Calcutta High Court.

== Origin of name ==
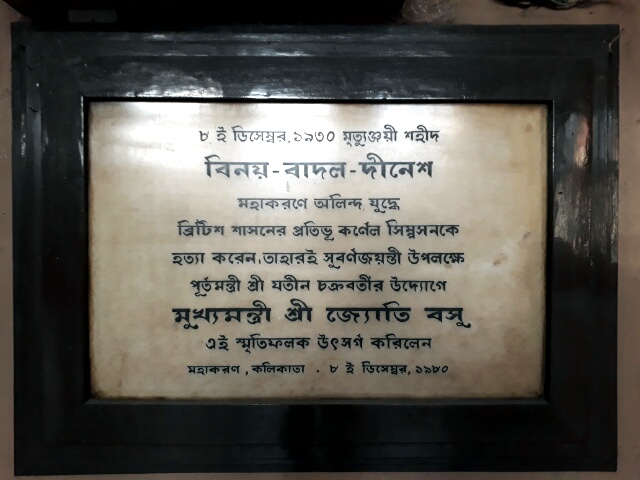
Memory of martyrdom

B. B. D. stands for three young Indian independence activists — Benoy Basu, Badal Gupta and Dinesh Gupta — who on 8 December 1930 assassinated the Inspector General of Prisons, N.S. Simpson, in the balconies of the Writers' Building of the then Dalhousie Square. The square had been named after Lord Dalhousie, Governor General of India from 1847 to 1856. At different times it has been called ‘The Green before the Fort’ and the Tank Square.

As we enter the town, very expansive square opens before us, with a large expanse of water in the middle, for public use… the square itself is composed of magnificent houses which render Calcutta not only one of the best town in Asia but one of the finest in the world. One side of the square consists of a range of buildings occupied by persons in civil employments under the Company, such as writers in public offices.

— Louis de Grandpré, A Voyage in the Indian Ocean and to Bengal (1803)

== Geography ==
The B.B.D. Bagh area is near the Hooghly River in the western part of Central Kolkata and is a square built around the old Lal Dighi tank. The old fort built by the British was near where the General Post Office now is. The area was in the heart of Kalikata or the White Town in old Calcutta.

== History ==
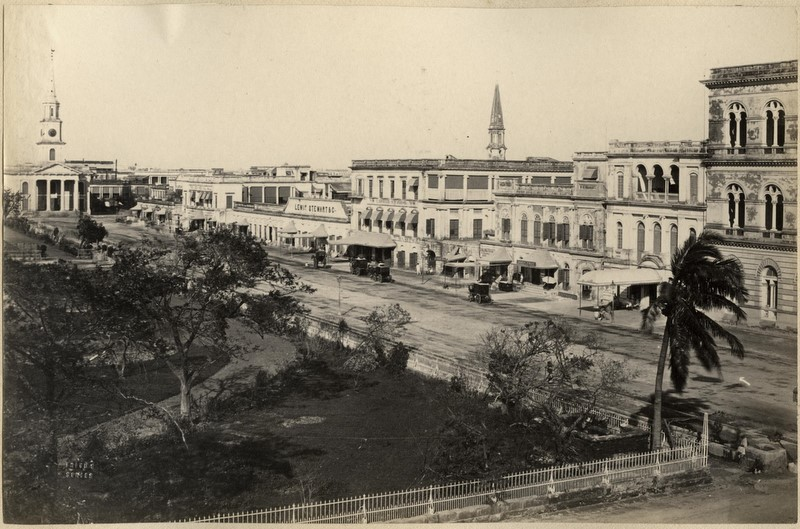
A picture of Dalhousie Square looking northeast in the 1870s

B.B.D. Bagh (or Dalhousie Square as it was formerly known) was created as the center of the British East India Company's trading post along the banks of the Hooghly River. Between the tank (now known as Lal Dighi) and the river, lay the original Fort William. In the summer of 1756, Nawab Siraj ud-Daulah of Bengal, Bihar and Orissa launched an attack on the British town for the company's decision to strengthen the fortifications around it. The survivors of the attack were sent to a garrison within the fort which spurred an incident infamously known as the Black Hole of Calcutta. The British soon retook the city after the Nawab retreated from the forces of Robert Clive. Within a year, the British East India Company's forces had taken all of Bengal and Calcutta, along with the square, was established as the commercial and political center of British India.

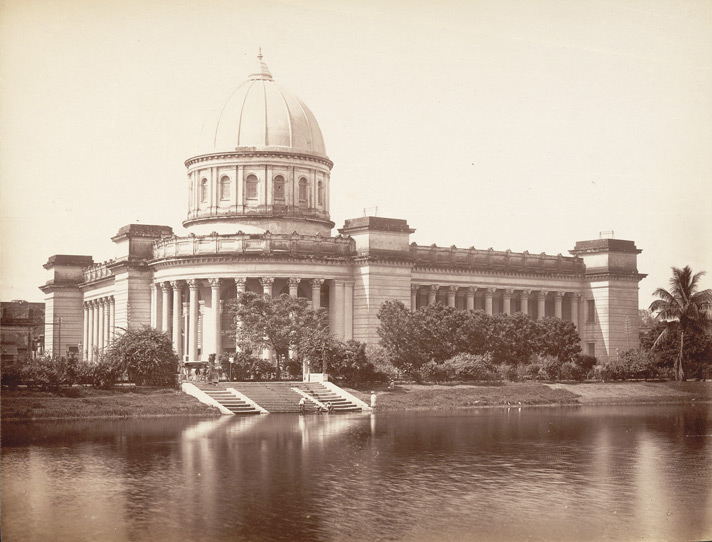
A view of the General Post Office in the 1880s

Over the next one and a half centuries, the square grew in importance and influence. It was named after Lord Dalhousie, the Governor-General of India. After the fall of company rule in India, Writers' Building became the secretariat of the Viceroy of India. A number of corporations and institutions opened offices and headquarters in and around the square, giving it its role as the central business district of the city. In 1912, the capital of the British Raj was officially moved to New Delhi, but the majority of the financial and political institutions in the area remained until the late 1920s.

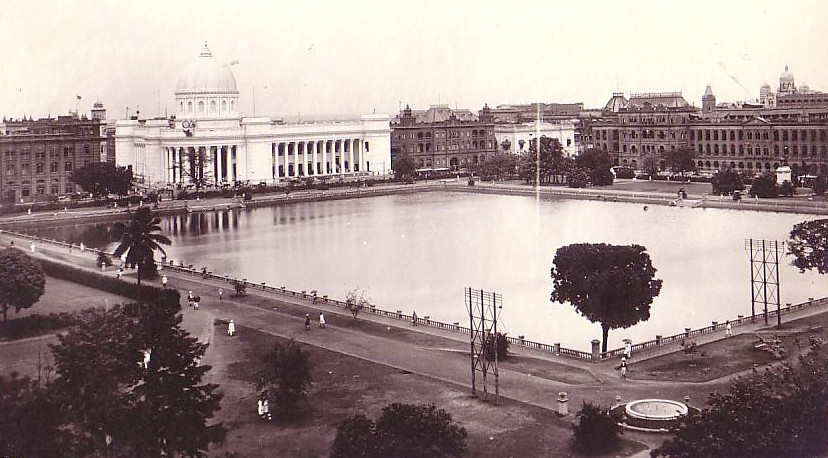
Dalhousie Square (B.B.D. Bagh), Calcutta in 1910

During the first half of the 20th century, the Indian Independence Movement began to reach its peak and took a violent turn in Bengal. On the eighth of December 1930, three revolutionaries, Benoy, Badal and Dinesh, stormed the building and fatally shot the Inspector General of Prisons, N.S. Simpson. The three attempted to commit suicide. Although Binoy and Badal succeeded in doing so, Dinesh was hospitalized and later hanged by the British officials. The square was renamed B.B.D. Bagh in their honor after Indian independence. In 1947, the political establishments were officially handed over to the government of India and the government of the newly formed state of West Bengal. Over the next few decades, Kolkata would go through rapid economic decline, but B.B.D. Bagh would remain the heart of East India.

== Modern significance ==
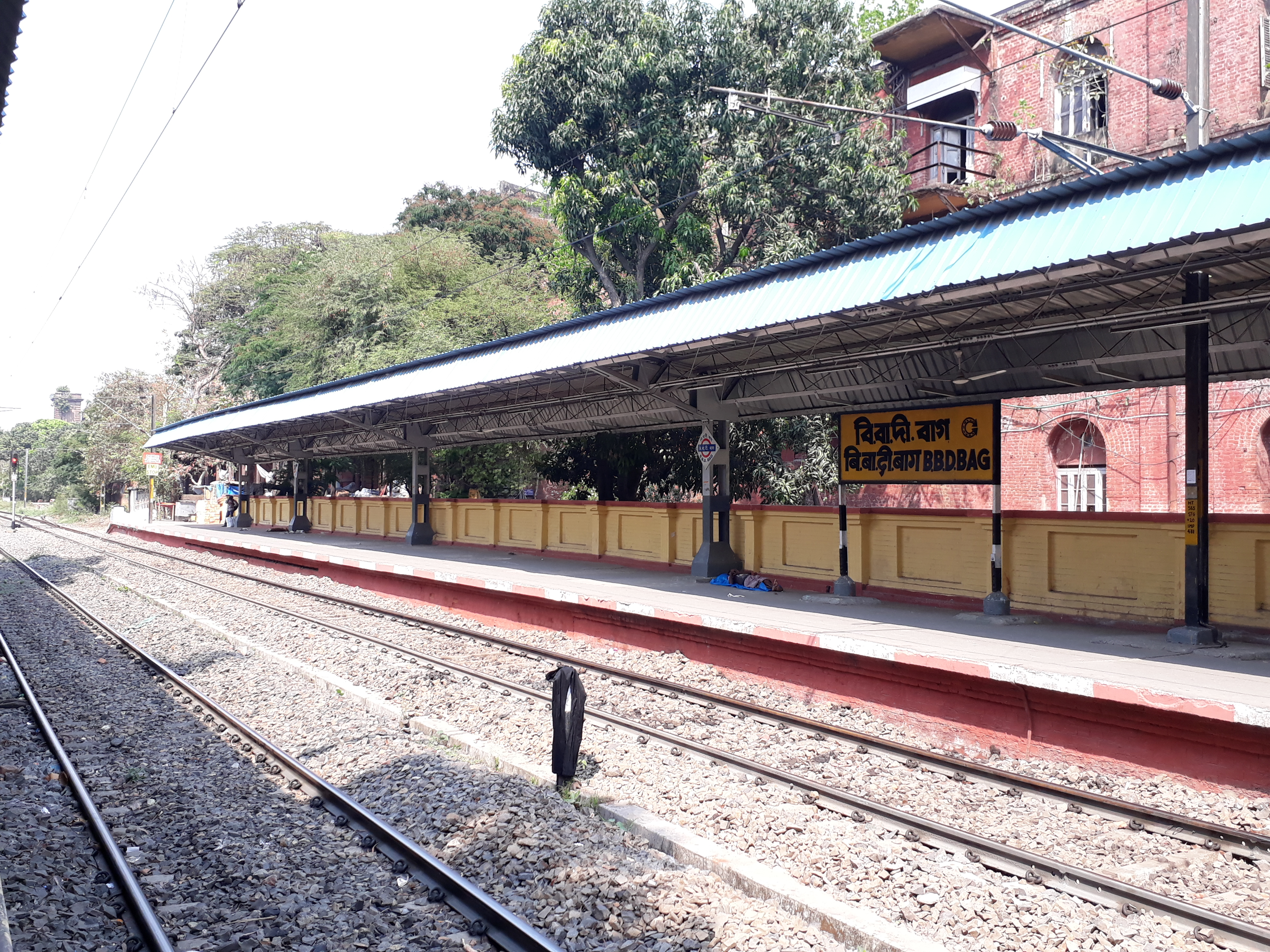
B.B.D. Bag circular railway station

B.B.D. Bagh is still the commercial and political center of all of East India and many of the business and political institutions from the colonial era still exist. The centerpiece is the Writers' Building which is the secretariat of the Government of the State of West Bengal and houses the office of the Chief Minister of West Bengal. To the west lie the General Post Office, the Royal Insurance Building, the eastern office of the Reserve Bank of India, the headquarters of the Eastern Railway, head office of the Kolkata Port Trust and a number of other government offices. The native name of the area is 'Office Para'. To the north lie the Royal Exchange Building which houses the Bengal Chamber of Commerce and Industry, the Calcutta Stock Exchange, the Standard Chartered Building and many financial establishments. The eastern end also houses a number of offices till Chittaranjan Avenue. The south area of the square is home to the Raj Bhavan, which is now the residence of the governor and the former residence of the viceroy and governor-general of India. A number of former British colonial administrative offices, including the former foreign and military secretariats, the Treasury Office, the Telegraph Office and Kolkata Town Hall can be found here. This area is also a major commercial district with the offices of HSBC at Hong Kong House and the Great Eastern Hotel.

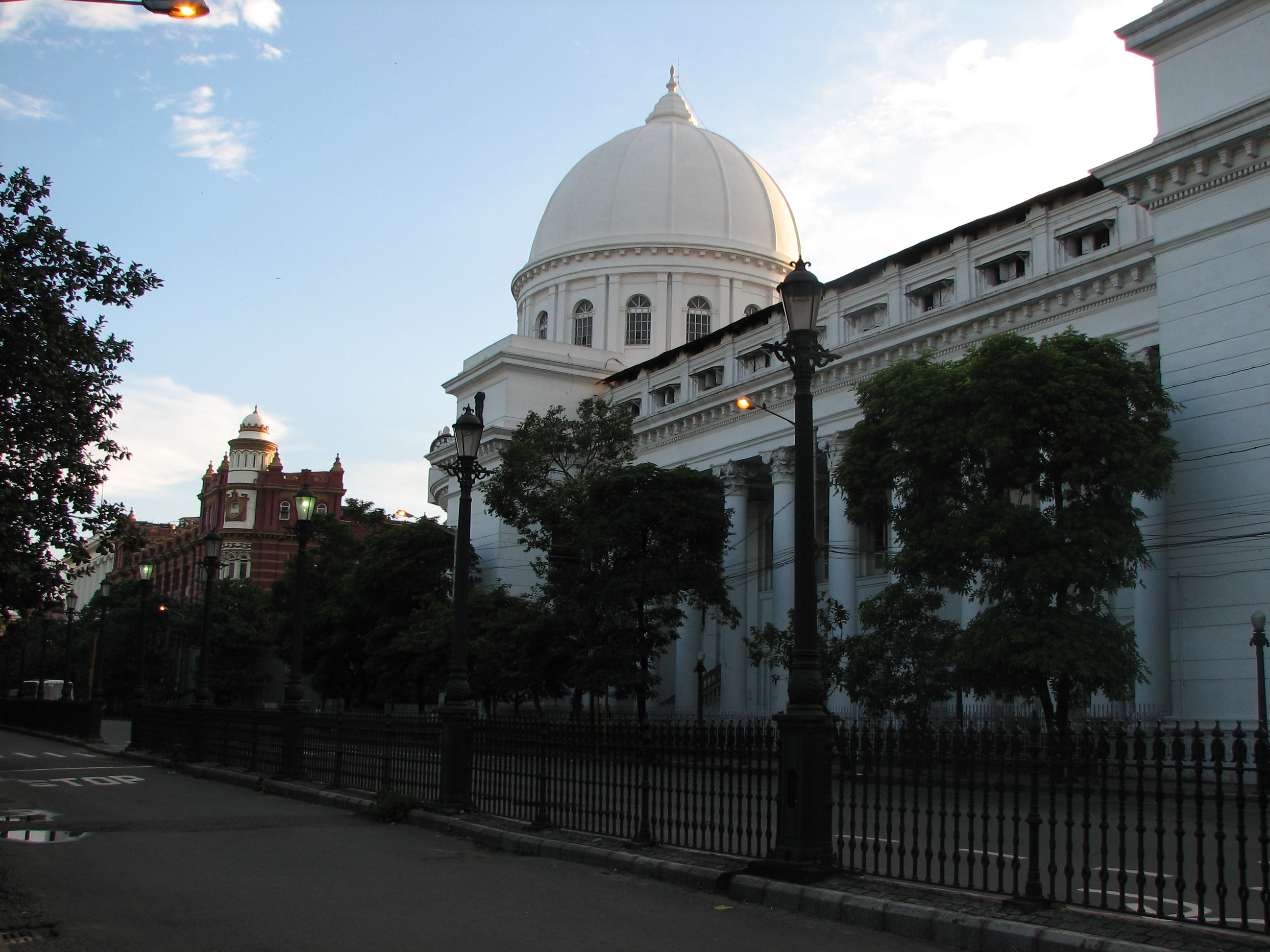
A view of the General Post Office in 2010

B.B.D. Bagh can still be considered one of the best remnants and concentrated zones of British colonial architecture in the world. The square is also characterized by other historical landmarks including St. John's Church, which was one of the first buildings in Kolkata and is modeled on St. Martin-in-the-Fields in London's Trafalgar Square. The church is home to beautiful stained glass windows and paintings as well as the mausoleum of Job Charnock, the man who founded modern Kolkata. B.B.D. Bagh also has a statue of famous philanthropist Maharaja Lakshmeshwar Singh of Darbhanga (1858–1898), sculpted by Edward Onslow Ford.

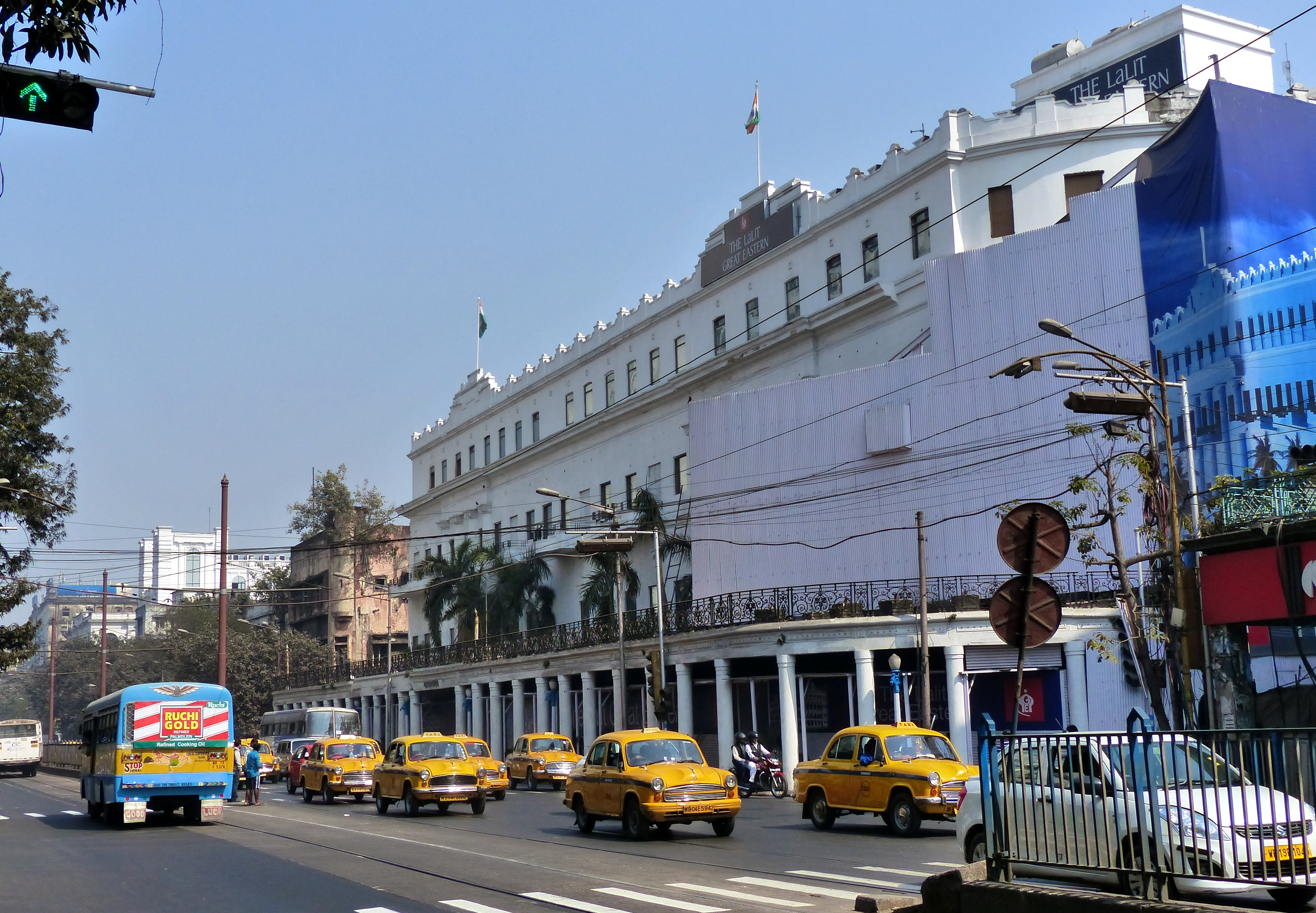
Great Eastern Hotel (Kolkata)

Overall, the square sees thousands of people arriving from all over the Kolkata metropolitan area to the offices and businesses that have characterized the area for the last three centuries since the establishment of Kolkata.

== Preservation ==
Dalhousie Square was included in the 2004 and 2006 World Monuments Watch by the World Monuments Fund due to "decades of neglect". After this listing the international financial services company American Express provided funding through WMF for the square's preservation. A number of buildings in the area have also been listed as heritage buildings and have gone through extensive restorations to bring back the charm of the square. The centerpiece, Writers' Building, has been temporarily vacated to give way for a massive restoration of the building, which has fallen into disrepair in many areas.

== Gallery ==
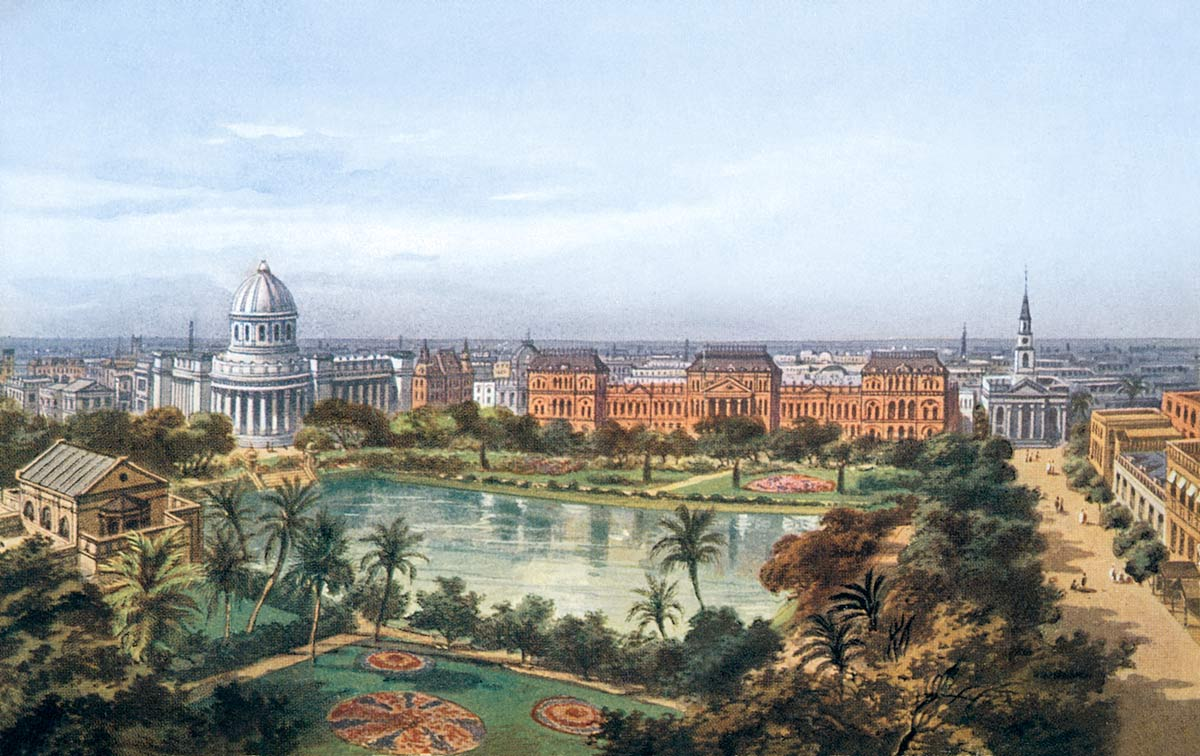
Dalhousie and its landmarks in a British era postcard

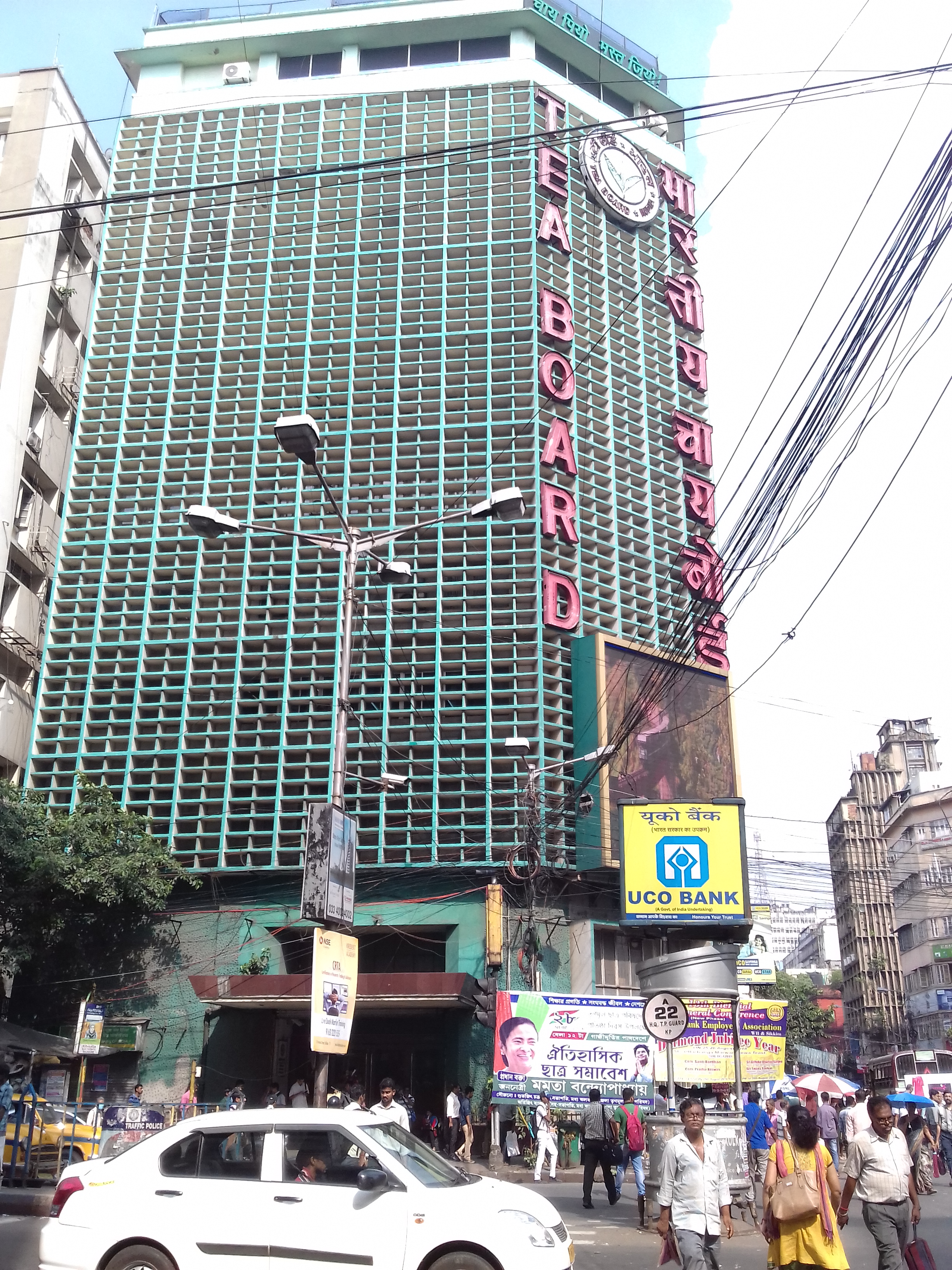
Tea Board of India

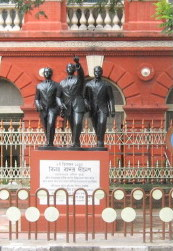
Statues of Benoy, Badal and Dinesh in front of Writers' Building

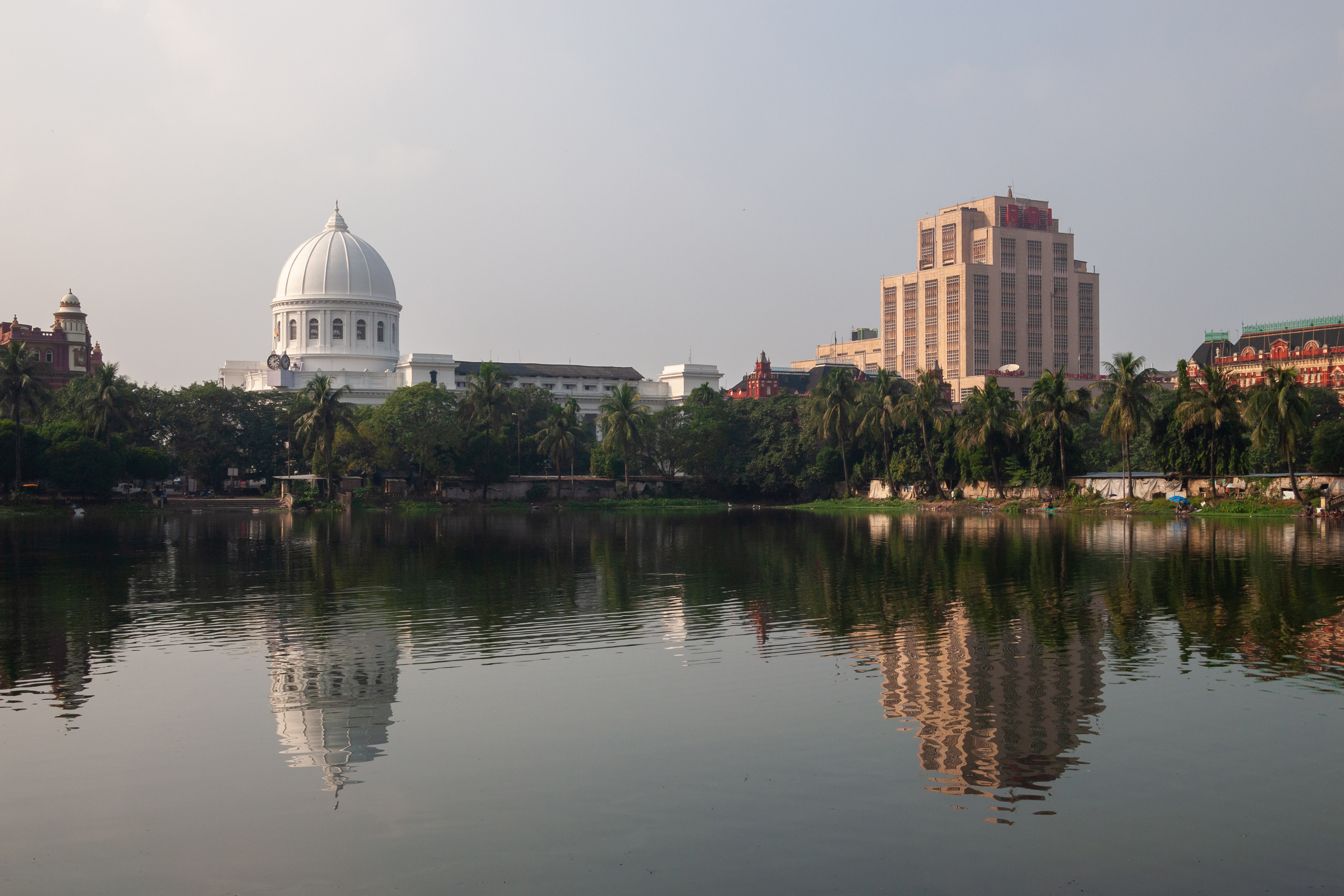
General Post Office and Reserve Bank of India building from across Lal Dighi

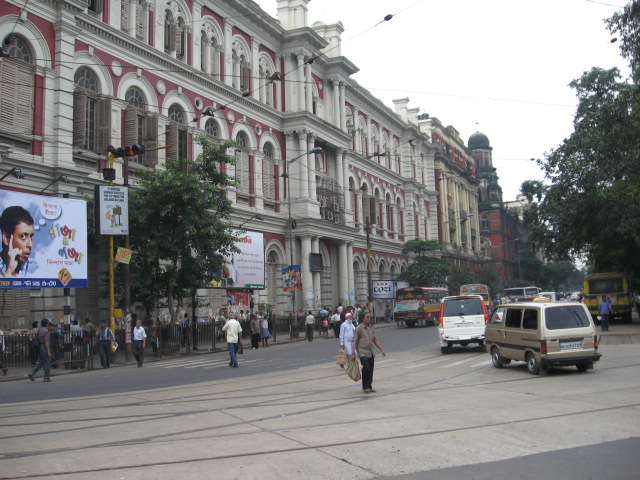
The southern side of B.B.D. Bagh

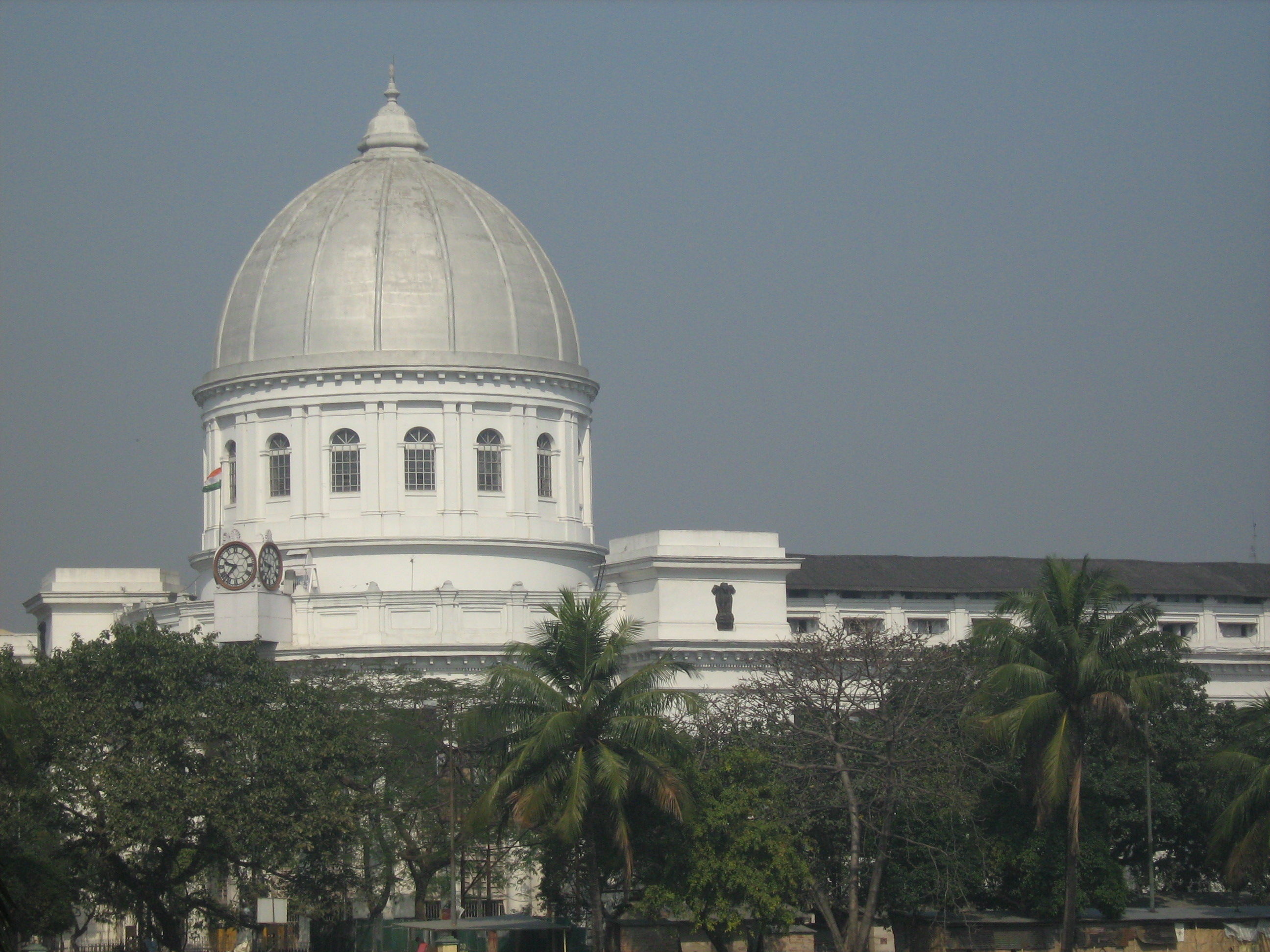
Dome of GPO from across Lal Dighi

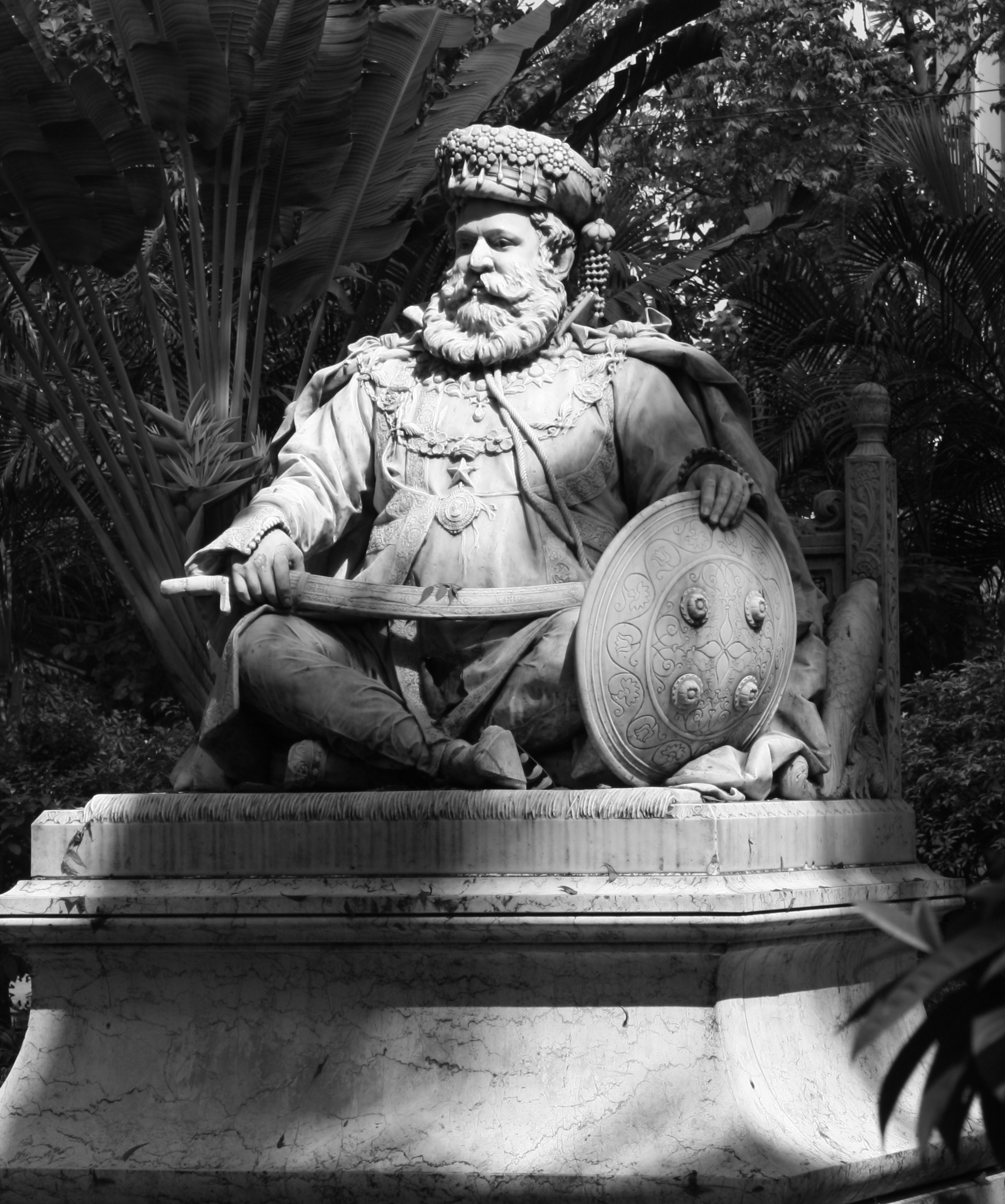
Statue of Maharaja Lakshmeshwar Singh

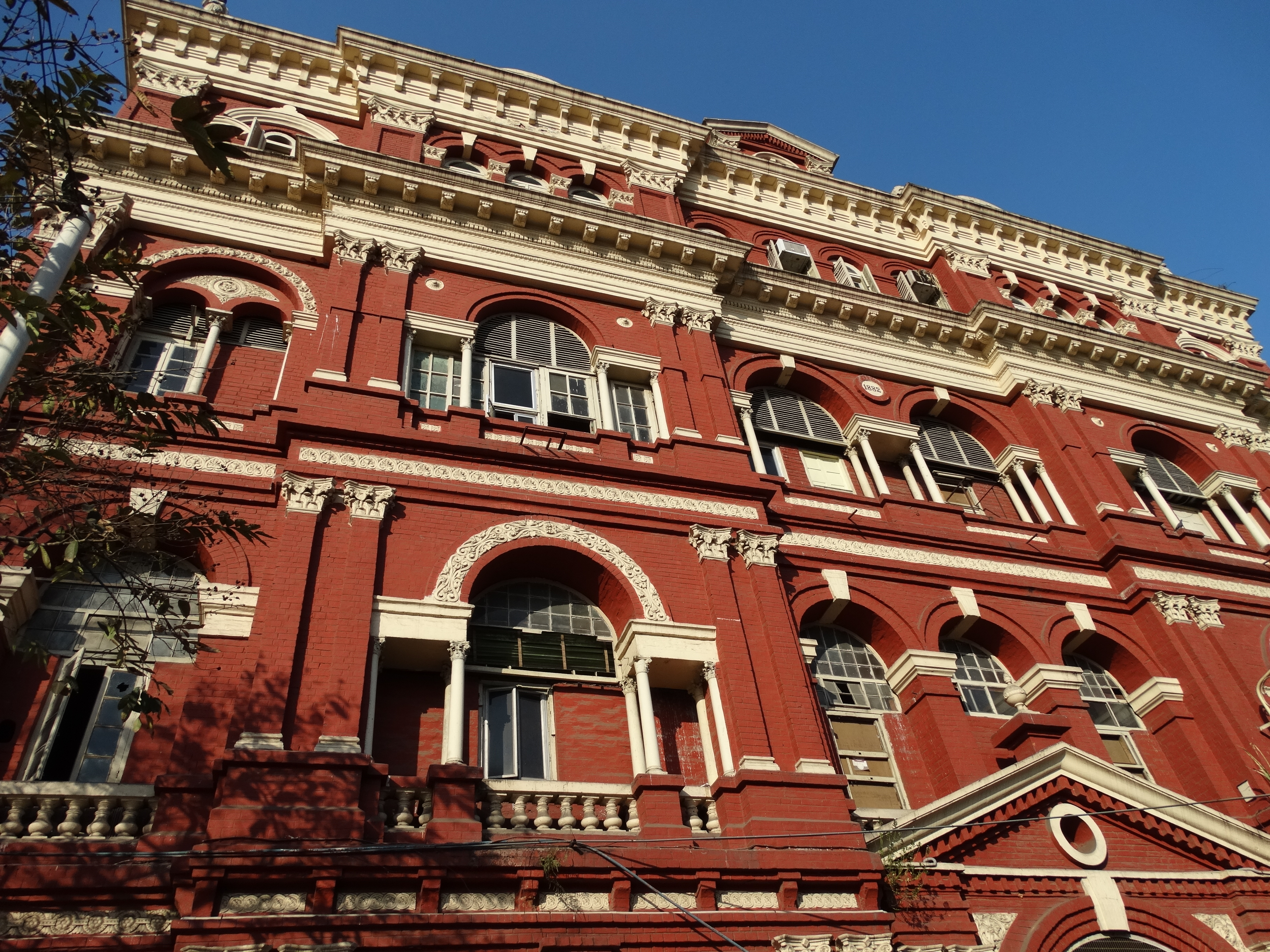
The facade of Writers' Building

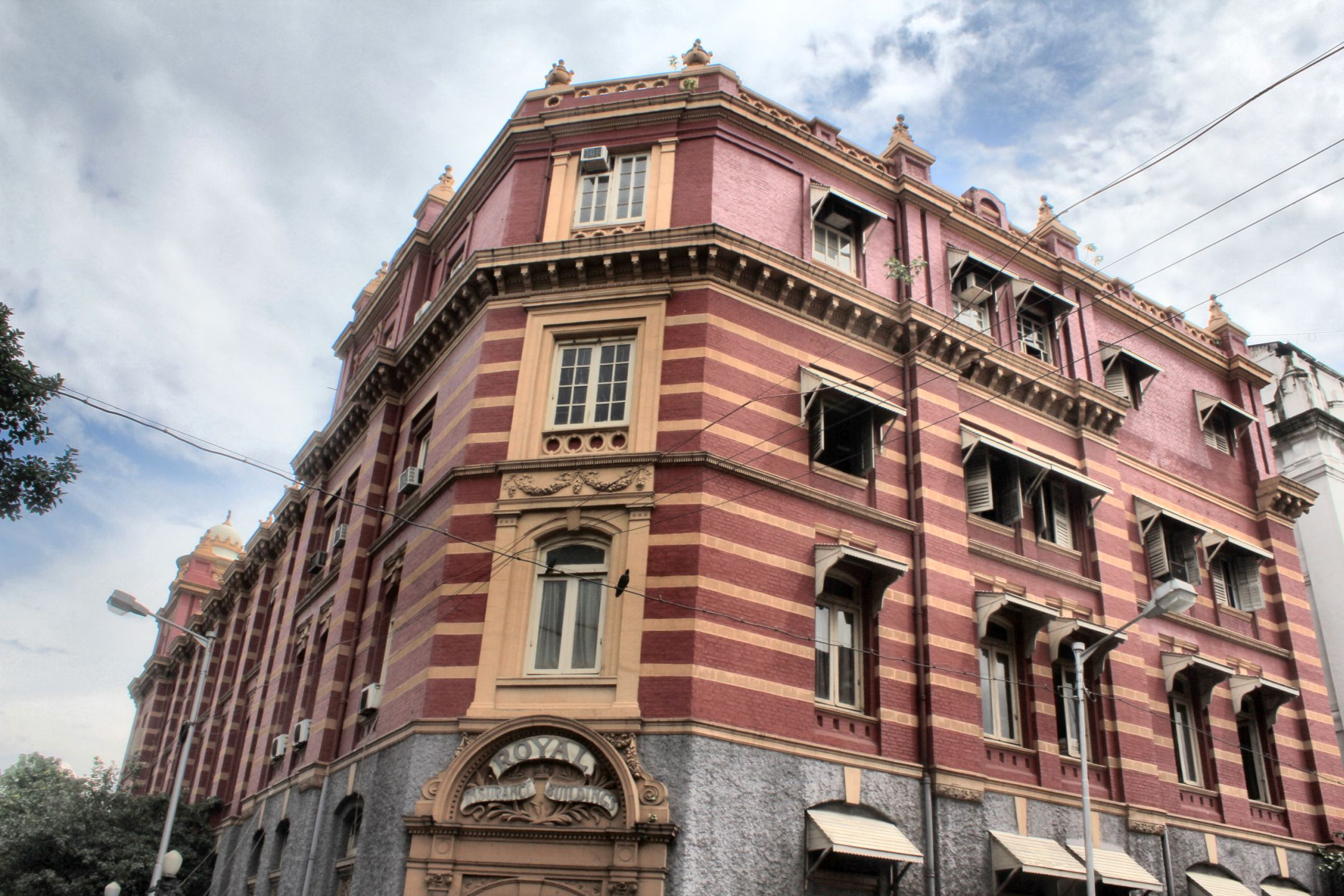
The Royal Insurance Building, Kolkata

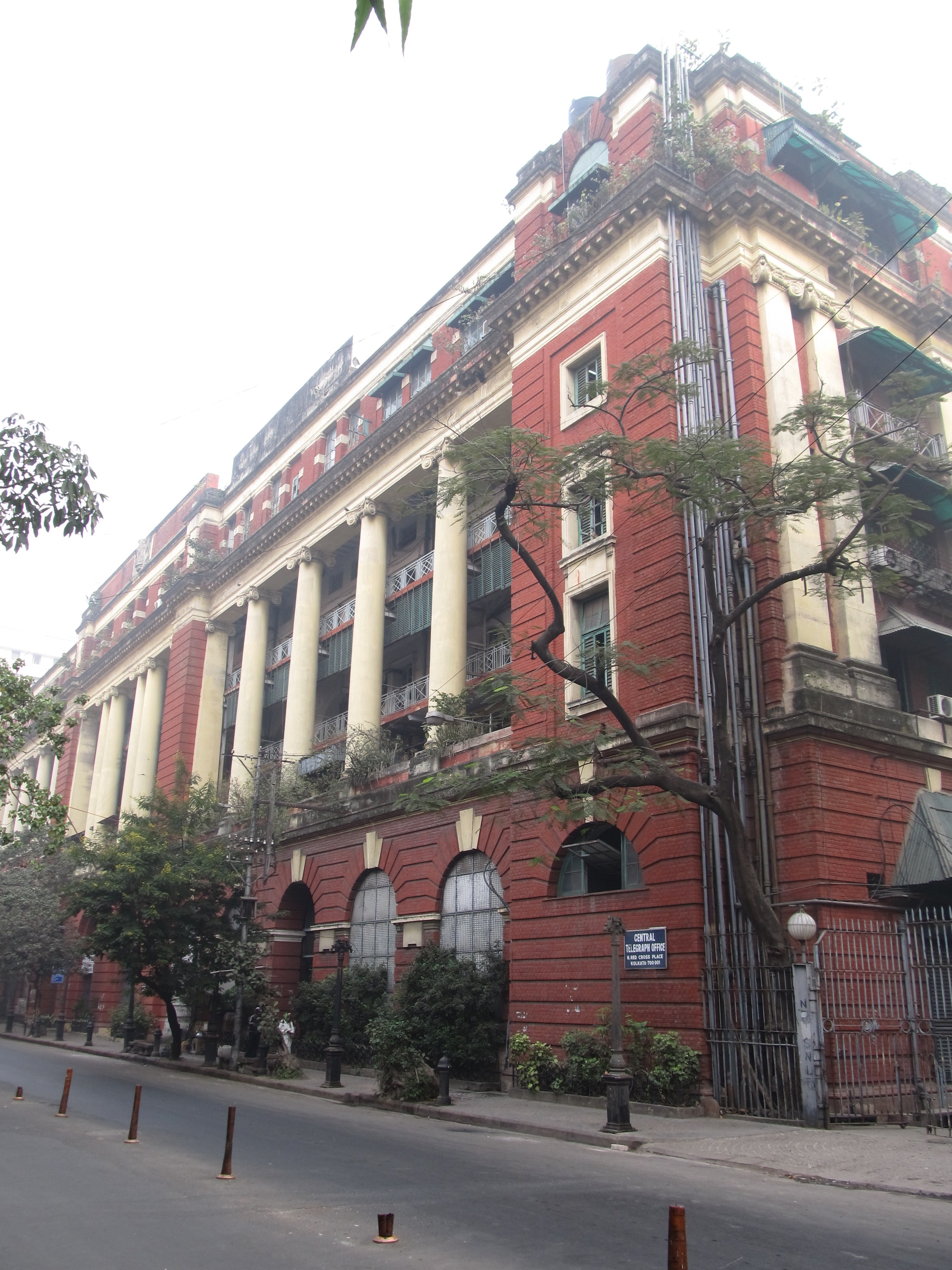
The Central Telegraph Office which lies to the south of the main square

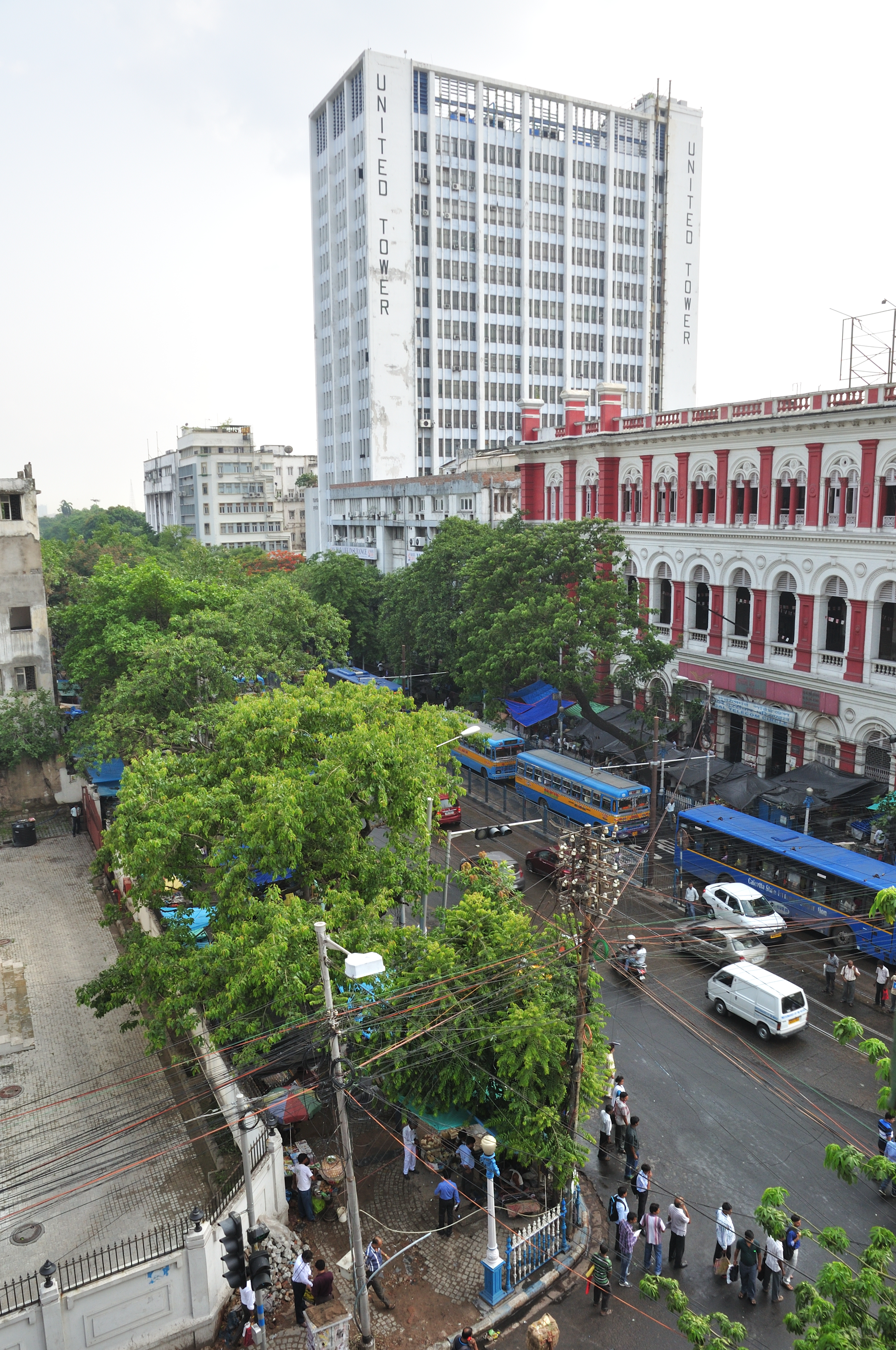
United Tower

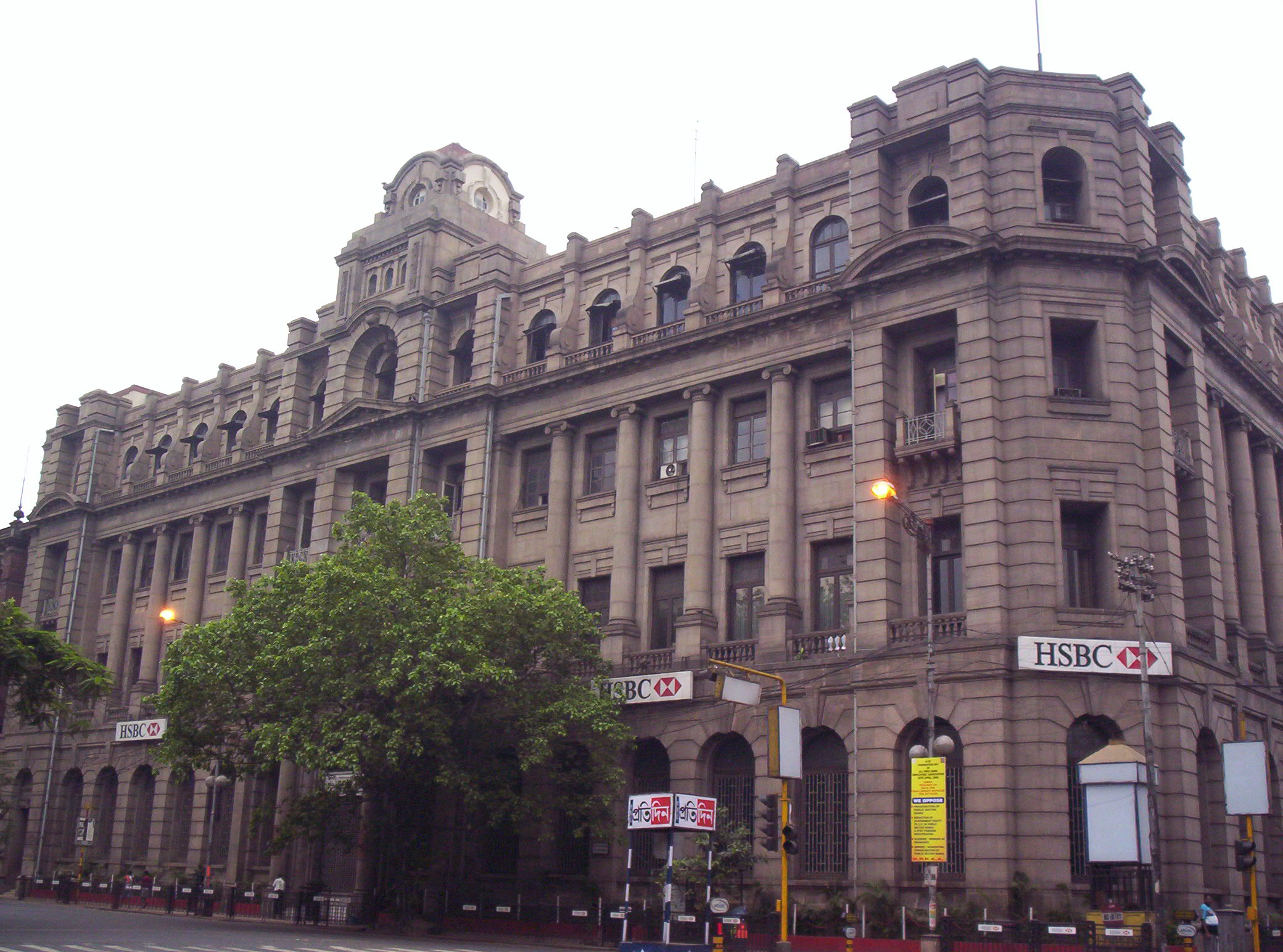
Hong Kong House which has and still houses the offices of HSBC in Kolkata

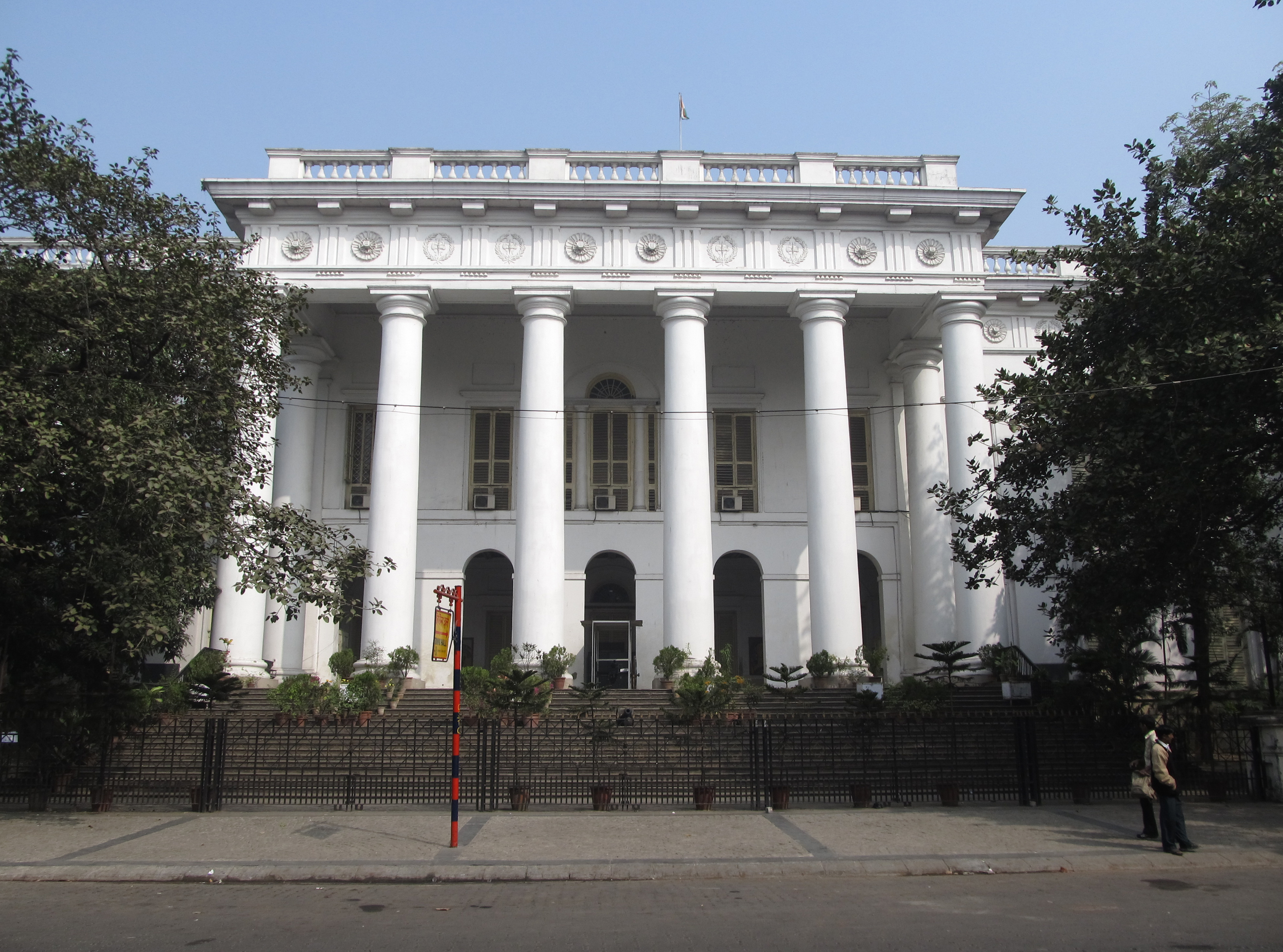
Kolkata Town Hall

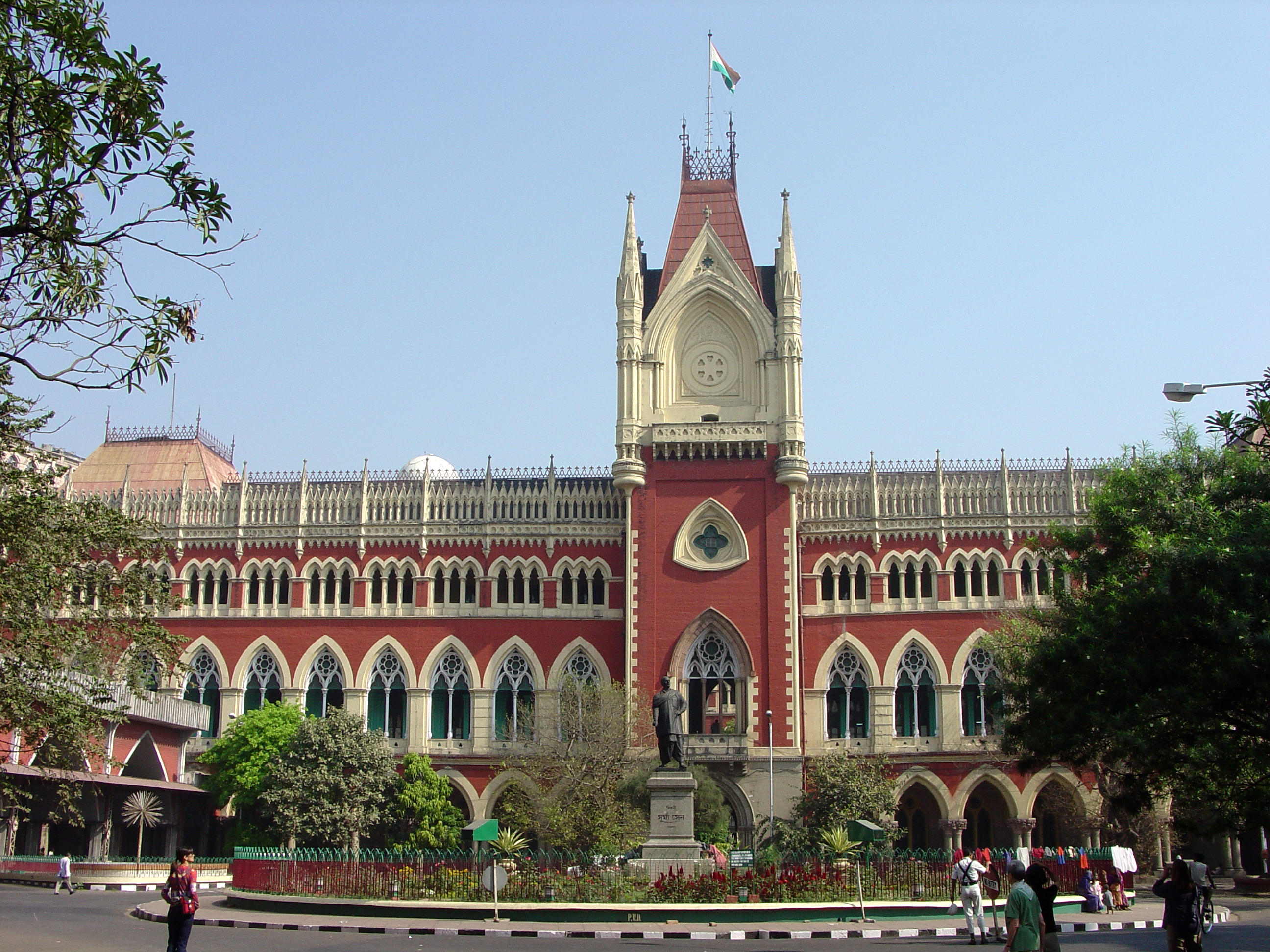
Calcutta High Court

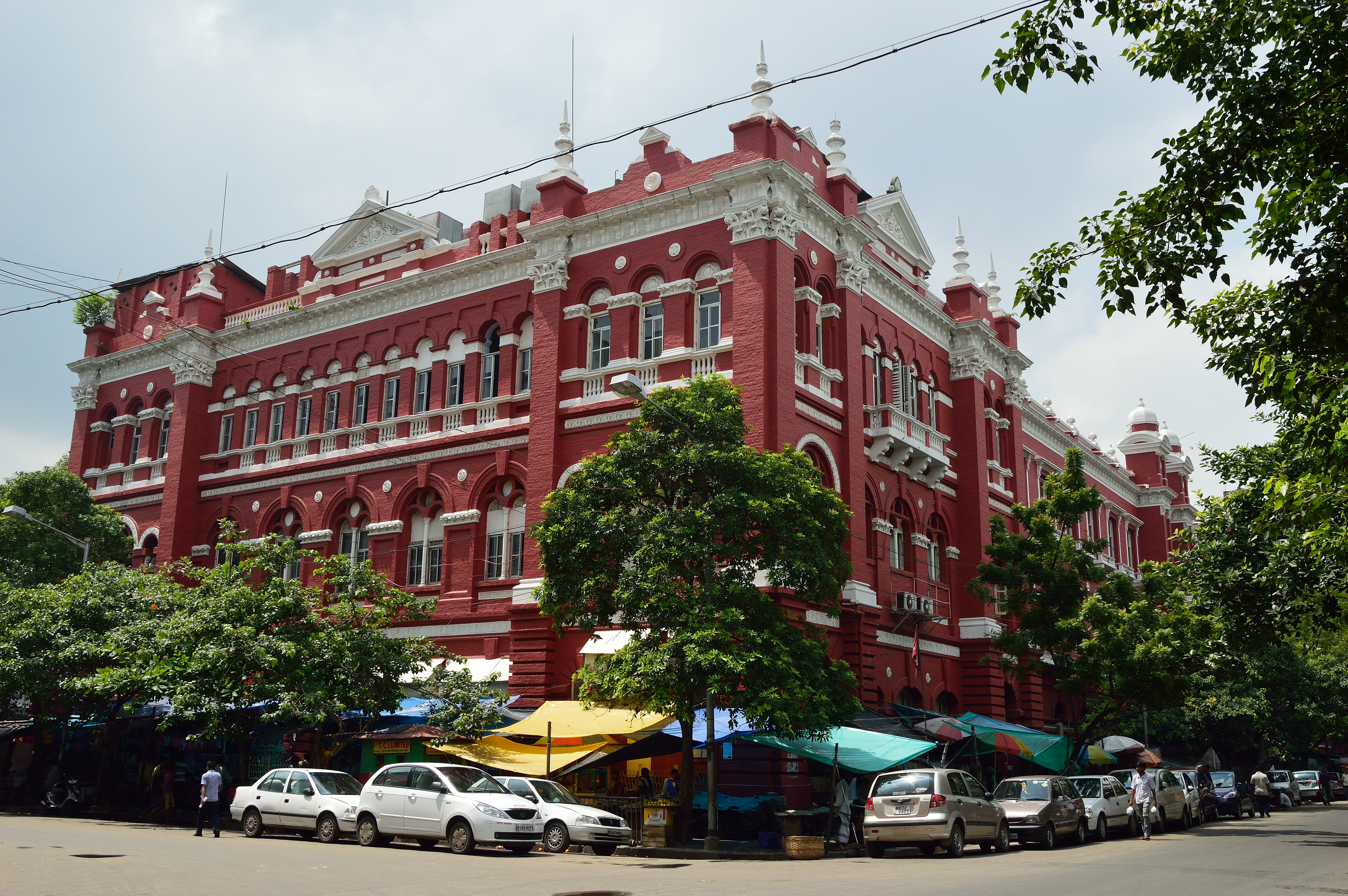
The old Koilaghat Building of the Eastern Railway

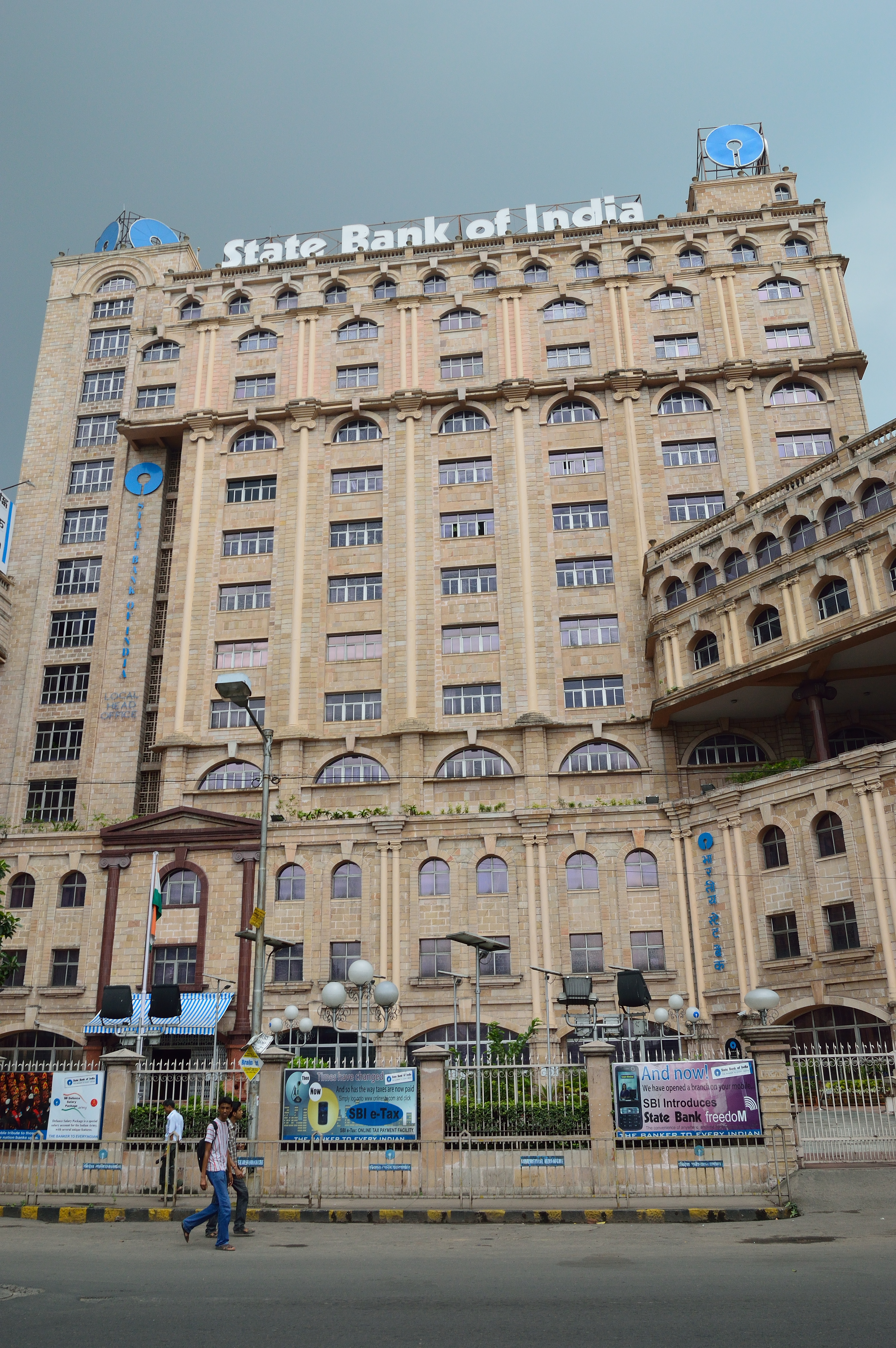
Samriddhi Bhavan, the eastern office of the State Bank of India

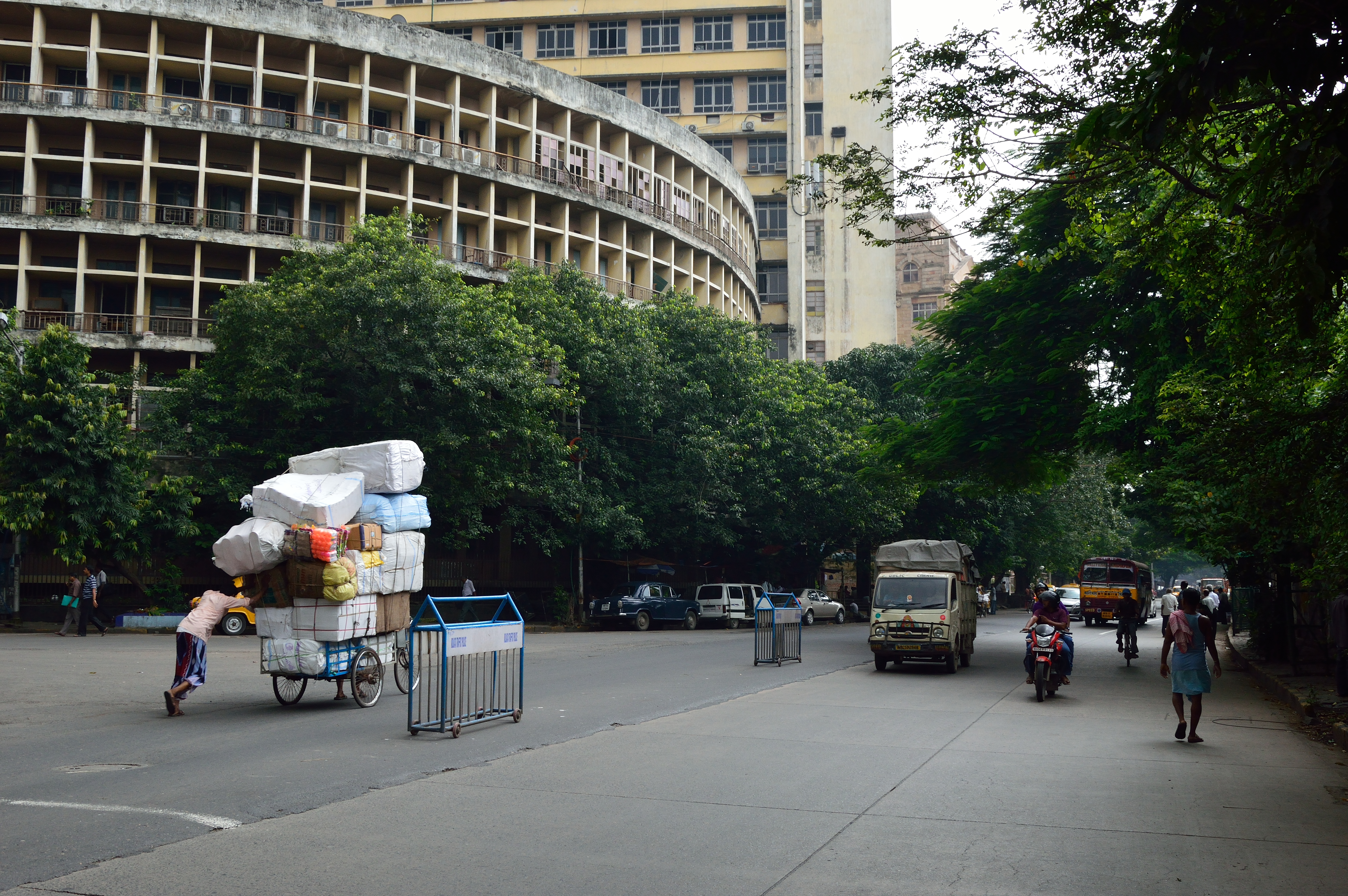
A view of Strand Road and a government administrative building

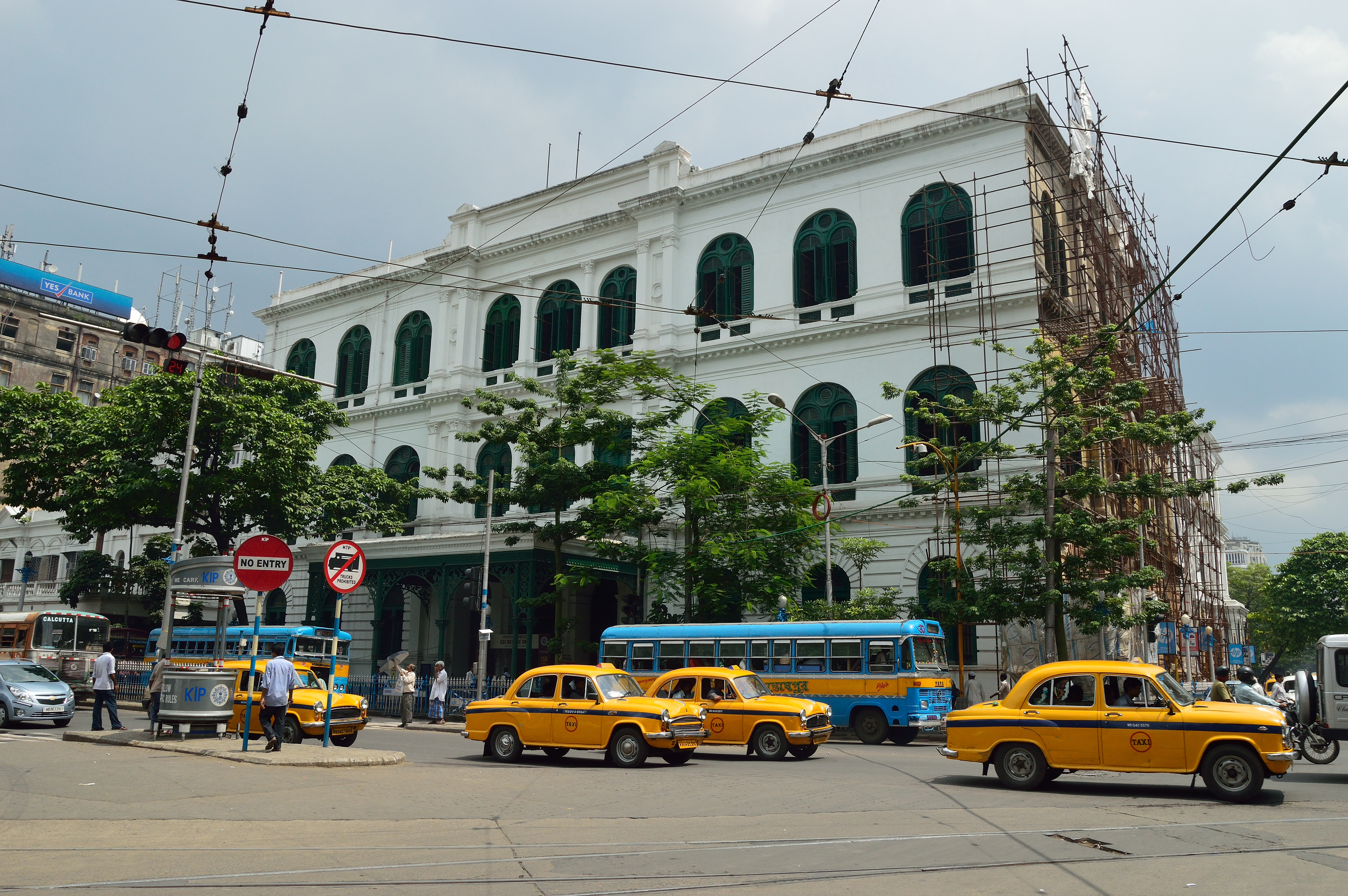
The Currency Building undergoing renovations and restorations

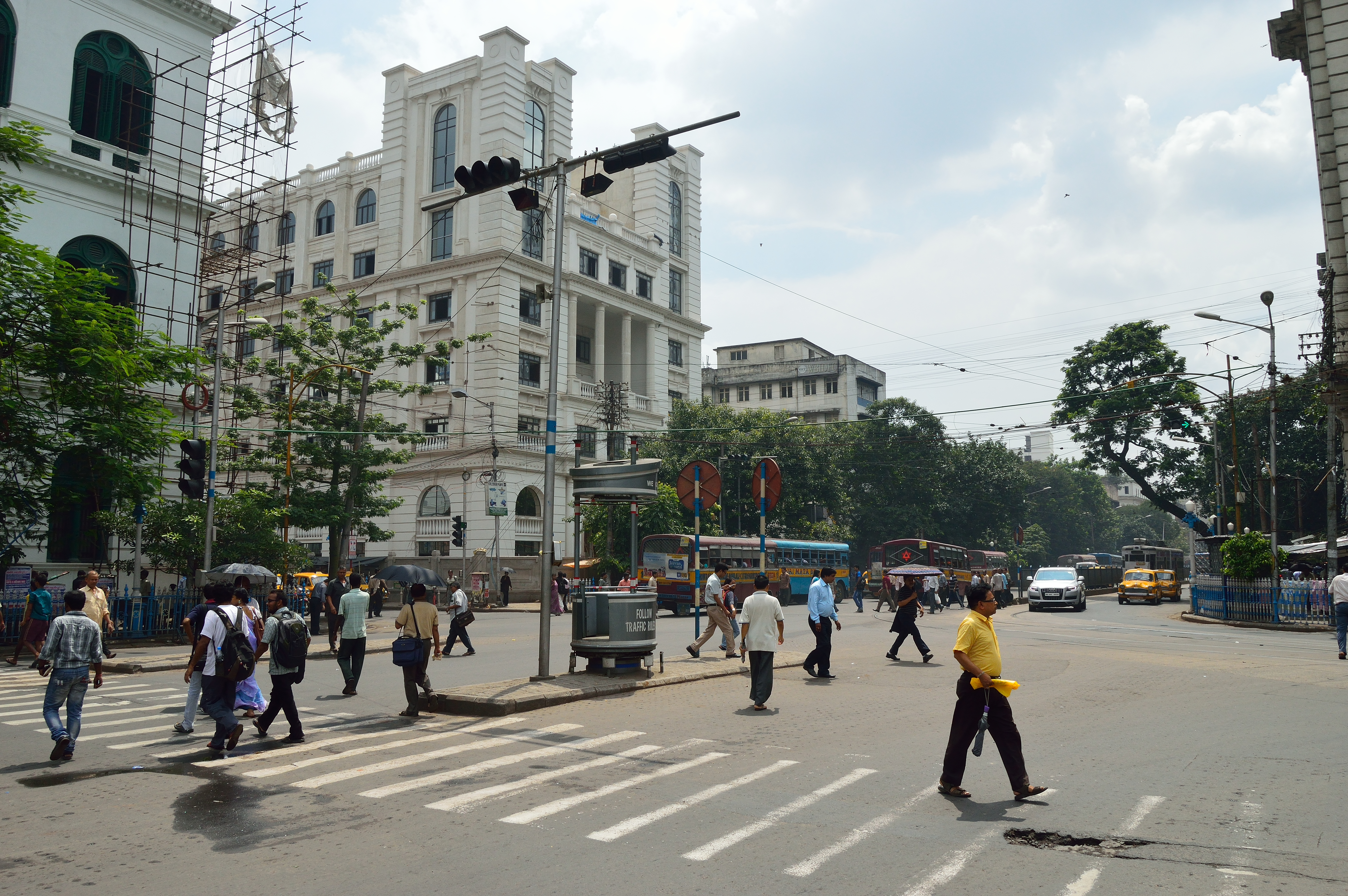
The south-eastern corner of the main square

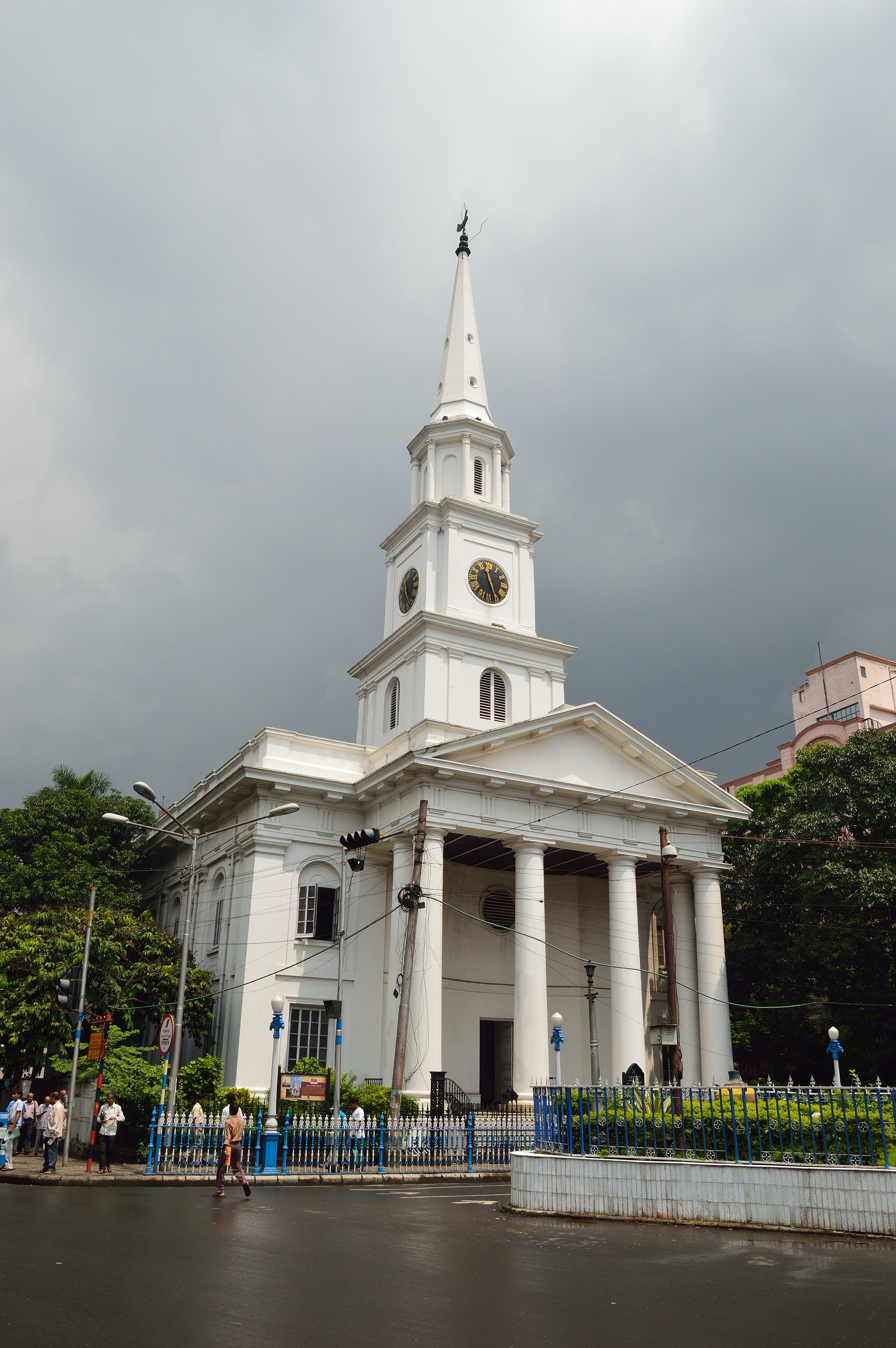
St. Andrew's Church in the center of the square

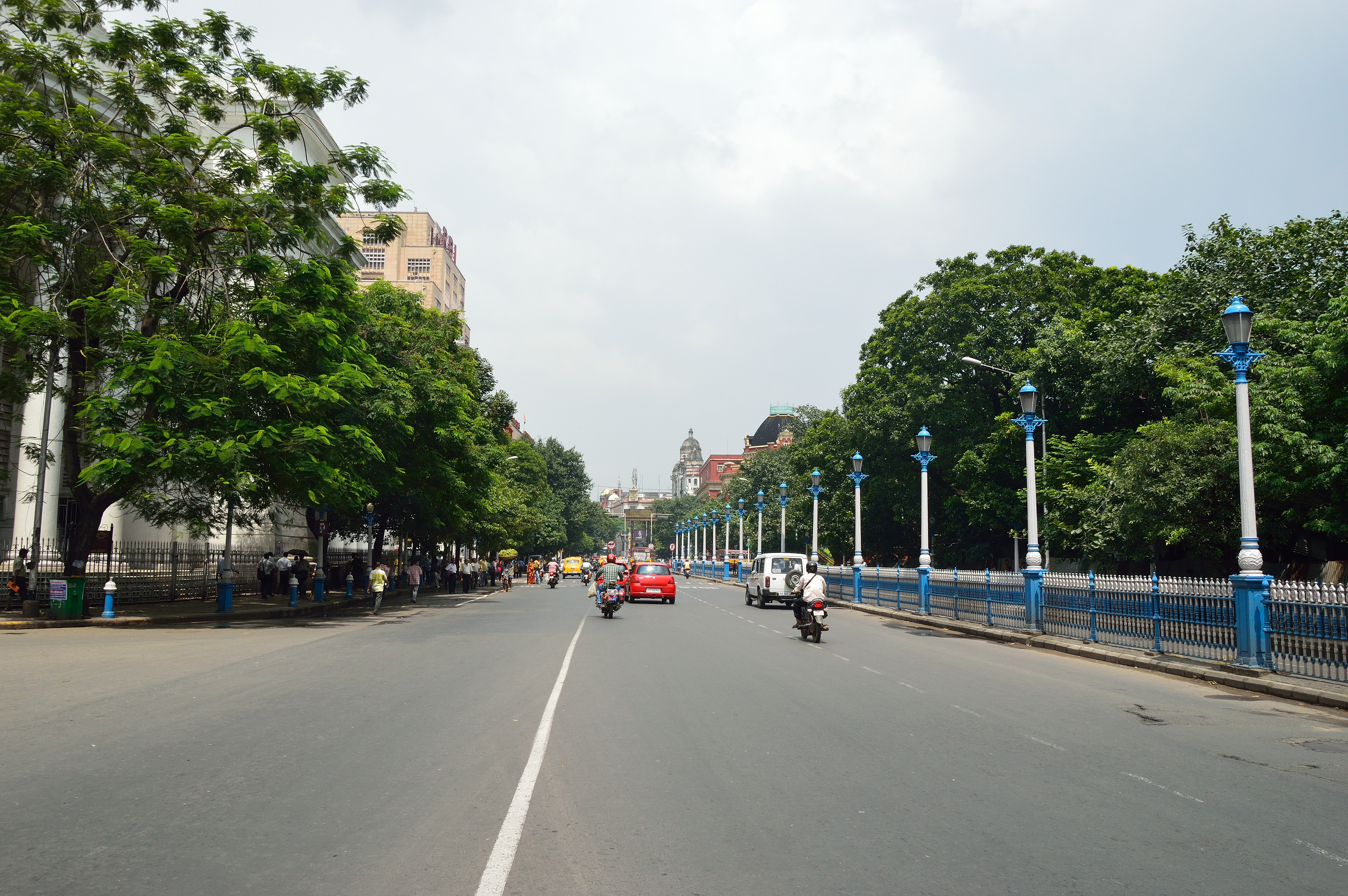
Netaji Subhas Road (formerly Clive Road) which runs along the eastern side of Lal Dighi

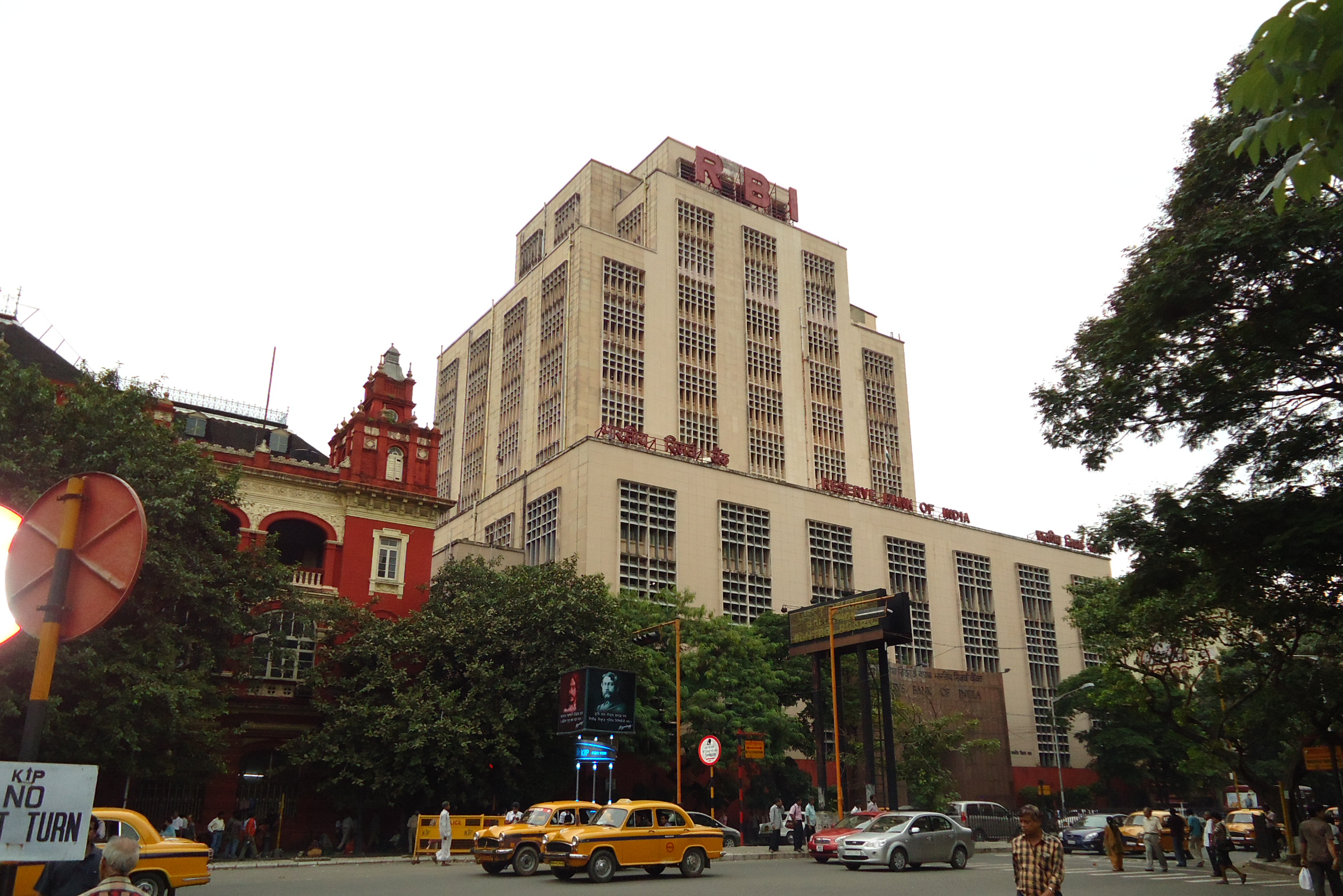
Reserve Bank of India (RBI), Kolkata

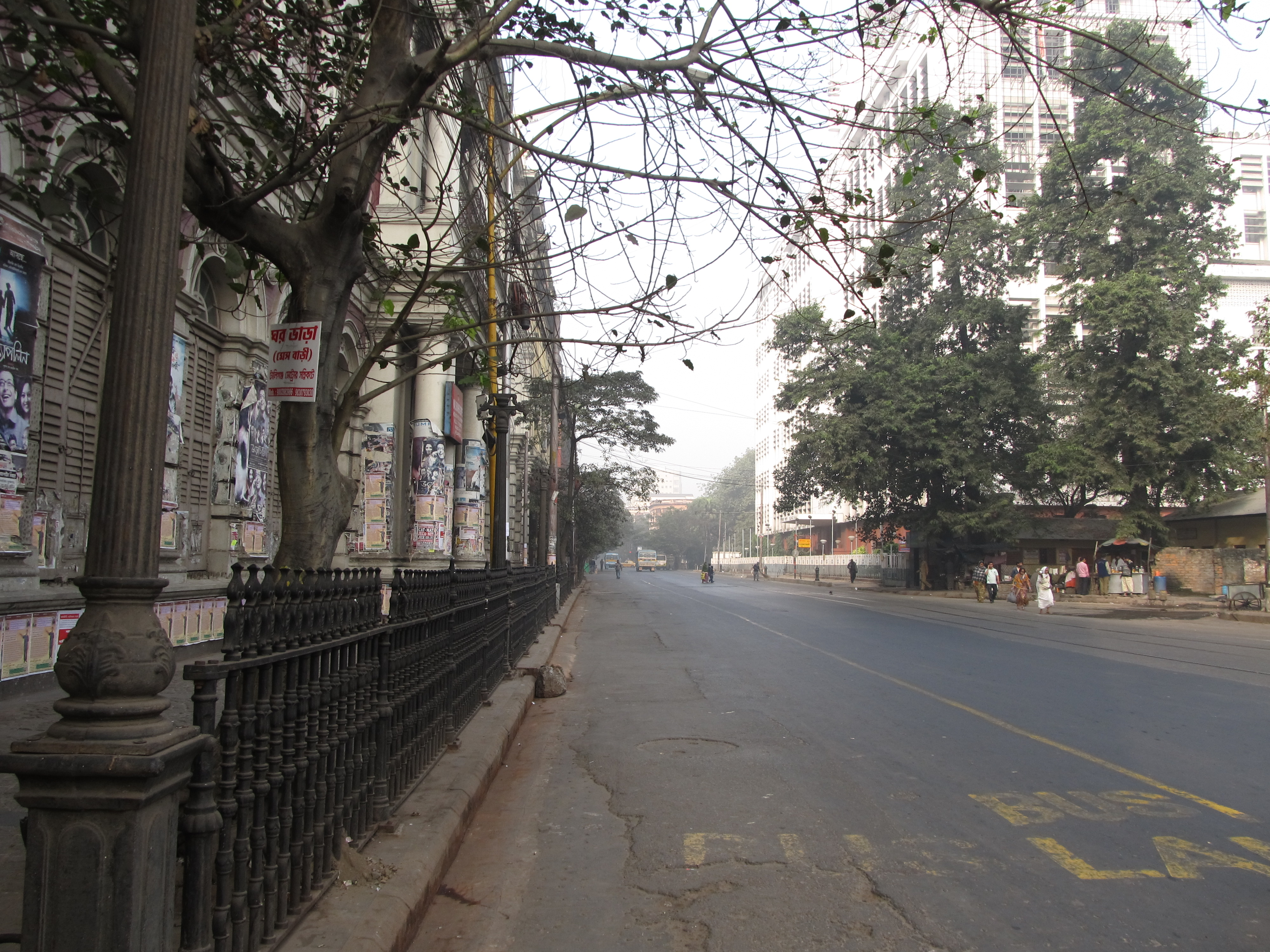
A view down Dalhousie Square South

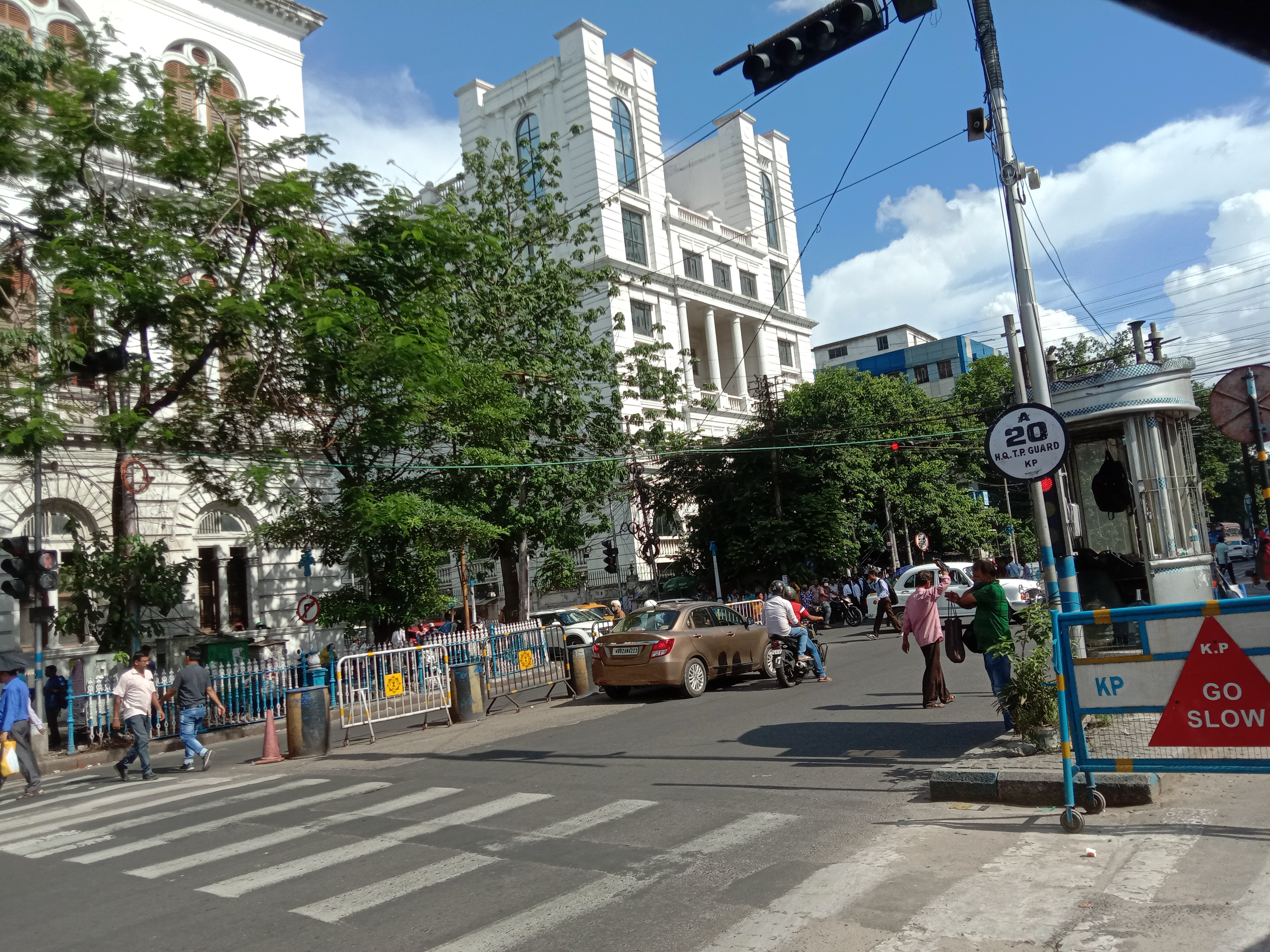
B. B. D. Bagh Bakultala
