= Grand-Pré =

Grand-Pré may refer to:

- Carlos de Grand Pré, governor of the West Florida in 1805 and of the Natchez District
- Grand-Pré National Historic Site, a park set aside to commemorate the Grand-Pré area of Nova Scotia as a centre of Acadian settlement from 1682 to 1755
- Grand-Pré, Nova Scotia, a Canadian rural community in Kings County, Nova Scotia
- Grandpré, Ardennes, France
- Raid on Grand Pré, the major action of a raiding expedition conducted by New England militia Colonel Benjamin Church against French Acadia in June 1704, during Queen Anne's War
- Battle of Grand Pré, also known as the Battle of Minas, a battle in King George's War in the winter of 1747 during the War of the Austrian Succession
- Siege of Grand Pre, a 1749 conflict during Father Le Loutre's War between the British and the Wabanaki Confederacy and Acadians

== See also ==
- Grandpré (disambiguation)
