= Vidhan Sabha Bhavan =

- Vidhan Sabha Bhavan in 2025
- Interactive map of the Vidhan Sabha Bhavan area
- Former names: Aaein Sabha Bhavan

General information
- Type: Legislative building
- Architectural style: Renaissance
- Location: Justice Radhabinod Pal Sarani, B. B. D. Bagh, Kolkata, India
- Coordinates: 22°34′01″N 88°20′39″E
- Current tenants: West Bengal Legislative Assembly
- Completed: 1931
- Client: Government of Bengal
- Owner: Government of West Bengal

Technical details
- Structural system: Concrete, brick-built

Design and construction
- Architect: J. Grieves
- Architecture firm: Martin & Company

Vidhan Sabha Bhavan (lit. 'Legislative Assembly House') is a government building on Justice Radhabinod Pal Sarani in Kolkata, the capital of the Indian state of West Bengal. Sessions of the West Bengal Legislative Assembly are held here regularly. The building was constructed in 1931. It was built by the then British authorities for the Bengal Legislative Assembly. Following the partition of India in 1947, the Bengal Province was divided, and as the western part was incorporated into the Republic of India as West Bengal, the building became the meeting place of the newly established West Bengal Legislative Assembly.

== History ==
In 1862, the first session of the Bengal Legislative Assembly was held at the Calcutta Public Library under the Indian Councils Act. From the implementation of the Government of India Act 1919, the sessions began to be held at the city's Town Hall. On 9 July 1928, the foundation stone of the legislative building was laid opposite the Town Hall. Construction of the building was completed in February 1931, and in 9 February of the same month, sessions of the Bengal Legislative Assembly was held in the new building. After the Government of India Act 1935 came into effect, the Bengal Legislative Council began to hold its sessions in this building. After India gained independence in 1947, the Bengal Province was divided and the state of West Bengal was formed, while the Bengal Legislative Assembly and Bengal Legislative Council were abolished and the West Bengal Legislative Assembly was established. In 2016, a fire broke out due to an electrical short circuit in an air conditioner. The fire did not cause any major damage. In 2022, construction of the Platinum Jubilee Memorial Building for the assembly's library and museum was completed within the building premises. In 2023, it was reported that the number of seats in the West Bengal Legislative Assembly could increase as a result of the delimitation of constituencies, which could require the construction of a new building for the assembly in New Town and the conversion of the current building into a tourist attraction. In 2026, the chief minister of the newly elected state government indicated that a new building for the assembly would be constructed.

== Architecture ==
The Assembly Building is situated on 33 bighas of land. It is shaped like the letter "H". It was constructed under the direction of architect J. Grieves through the initiative of Martin & Company.

== Legacy ==
At the end of 2023, the Kolkata Municipal Corporation recognized the building as a Grade-I heritage building.

In September 2025, after the assembly remained closed for an extended period due to various festivals, rumors spread among some of its security guards that the building was haunted and that various mysterious sounds could be heard there at night.
