= Louis de Grandpré =

Louis Marie Joseph Ohier de Grandpré
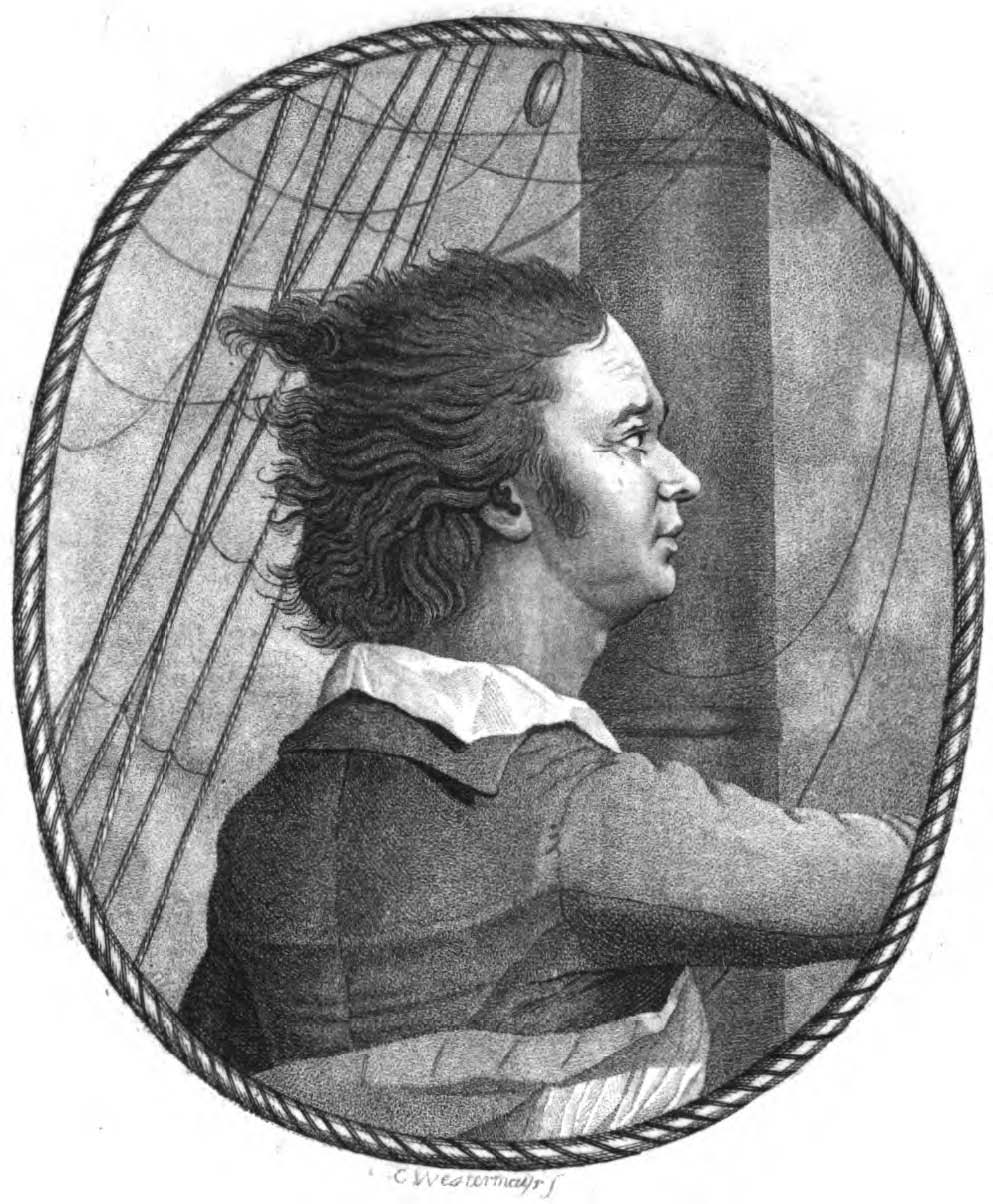
- Portrait by Conrad Westermayr, 1803
- Born: May 7, 1761; Saint-Malo, France
- Died: January 7, 1846 (aged 84); Paris, France
- Spouse: Marie Thérèse de Jehannot Penquer
- Military career
- Allegiance: France
- Branch: French Navy
- Rank: Captain
- Awards: Order of Saint Louis

Louis Marie Joseph Ohier de Grandpré (May 7, 1761 – January 7, 1846) was a French Navy officer and slave trader. Between 1789 and 1790, Grandpré toured the Indian Ocean, beginning at Île de France (Mauritius), and included visits to India, the Seychelles, Vietnam (then Cochin China), Yemen, and Sri Lanka.

== Early years ==
Grandpré was born in Saint-Malo, France on May 7, 1761. His father, Louis Athanase Ohier, was slave ship captain of Irish descent. His mother, Nicole Marie Louise, came from a family from the Valais canton in Switzerland. At age six, Grandpré began school in Rennes. He left school at an early age to pursue his interest in sailing, later demonstrating his ability as a sailor in the American Revolutionary War.

In March 1781, while serving in Viceadmiral Pierre André de Suffren's fleet, he traveled from Brest to India, where the French engaged the British fleet.

On November 29, 1783, he married Marie Thérèse de Jehannot Penquer (1762-1837) on the island of Mauritius.

== Slave trade ==
Grandpré, himself a former slave trader, described violent abuses of African slaves in his Voyage à la côte occidentale d'Afrique published in 1801. In 1787 alone, Grandpré worked on ships involved in the transportation of 1,500 slaves to the Americas and witnessed "often many cruelties".

== Later years ==
Grandpré served in the French Royal Navy for 15 years, after which lived his remaining life at the Hotel des Invalides in Paris. He died, destitute, on January 7, 1846.

== Bibliography ==
- A Voyage in the Indian Ocean and to Bengal, undertaken in the Years 1789 and 1790: Containing an Account of the Sechelles Islands and Trincomale, Paris, 1801
- Louis Marie Joseph Ohier de Grandpré, Abrégé élémentaire de géographie physique, Firmin Didot, Père et Fils, 1825, 251 p.
- Voyage à la côte occidentale d'Afrique, Dentu, Paris, 1801
