= Royal Road =

Ancient highway reorganized and rebuilt in the Achaemenid Empire

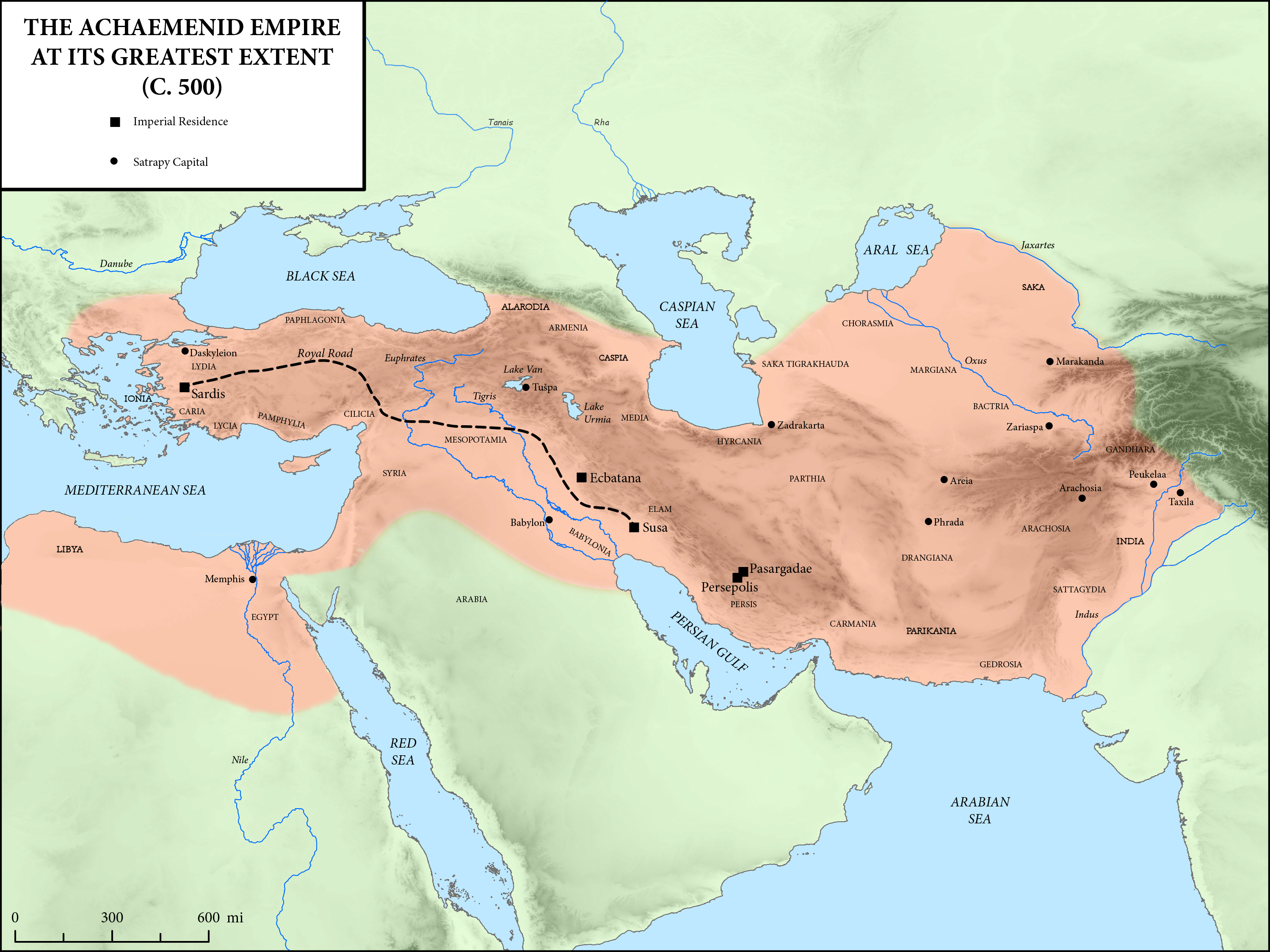
The map of Achaemenid Empire and the section of the Royal Road noted by Herodotus

The Royal Road was an ancient highway reorganized and rebuilt for trade in the 5th century BCE by the Achaemenid Empire. The road was built to facilitate rapid communication on the western part of the large empire from Susa to Sardis and was probably perfected under Darius I. Mounted couriers of the Angarium were supposed to travel 1,677 miles (2,699 km) from Susa to Sardis in nine days; the journey took ninety days on foot.

== Course ==
The course of this road has been reconstructed from the writings of Herodotus, archeological research, and other historical records.

== History ==
Because the road did not follow the shortest nor the easiest route between the most important cities of the empire, archeologists believe the westernmost sections of the road may have originally been built by the Assyrian kings, as the road plunges through the heart of their old empire. More eastern segments of the road, identifiable in present-day northern Iran, were not noted by Herodotus, whose view of Persia was that of an Ionian Greek in the West. Stretches of the Royal Road across the central plateau of Iran, such as the Great Khorasan Road, are coincident with the major trade route known as the Silk Road.

However, Darius I improved the existing road network into the Royal Road as it is recognized today. A later improvement by the Romans of a roadbed with a hard-packed gravelled surface of 6.25 m width held within a stone curbing was found in a stretch near Gordium. The improvements connected the parts together in a unified whole stretching some 1677 miles, primarily as a post road. It included one hundred and eleven posting stations maintained with a supply of fresh horses, a quick mode of communication using relays of swift mounted messengers, the empire's pirradazis.

In 1961, under a grant from the American Philosophical Society, S. F. Starr traced the stretch of road from Gordium to Sardis, identifying river crossings by ancient bridge abutments.

== Legacy ==
The Greek historian Herodotus wrote, "There is nothing in the world that travels faster than these Persian couriers." Herodotus's praise for these messengers — "Neither snow nor rain nor heat nor gloom of night stays these couriers from the swift completion of their appointed rounds" — was inscribed on the James Farley Post Office in New York, and although the United States Postal Service has no official motto or creed, this phrase is sometimes thought of as their creed.

=== A metaphorical "Royal Road" in famous quotations ===
Euclid is said to have replied to King Ptolemy's request for an easier way of learning mathematics that "there is no Royal Road to geometry", according to Proclus himself quoting Archimedes. The same sentence is also attributed to Menaechmus replying to Alexander the Great.

Charles Sanders Peirce, in his How to Make Our Ideas Clear (1878), says, "There is no royal road to logic, and really valuable ideas can only be had at the price of close attention."

Sigmund Freud famously described dreams as the "royal road to the unconscious" ("Via regia zur Kenntnis des Unbewußten").

Karl Marx wrote in the 1872 Preface to the French Edition of Das Kapital (Volume 1), "There is no royal road to science, and only those who do not dread the fatiguing climb of its steep paths have a chance of gaining its luminous summits."

The Royal Road to Romance (1925) is the first book by Richard Halliburton, covering his world travels as a young man from Andorra to Angkor.

== See also ==
- Angaria (Roman law)
- Angarum
- Baghdad Railway
- Chapar Khaneh
- El Camino Real (California)
- Great Trunk Road
- History of Iran
- Inca road system
- Persian Corridor
- Roman roads
- Trans-Iranian Railway
- Via Regia (Germany)
