= Angaria (Roman law) =

Roman law

Angaria (Latin; Ancient Greek: ἀγγαρεία, Bulgarian: ангарѝя) was a sort of postal system adopted by the Roman imperial government from the ancient Persians. According to Xenophon, the Persian system was established by Cyrus the Great. Couriers on horseback were posted at certain stages along the chief roads of the empire, for the transmission of royal dispatches by night and day in all weather.

The Roman system took its name from the Greek form of a Babylonian word adopted in Persian for these mounted couriers. In the Roman system, the supply of horses and their maintenance was a compulsory duty from which the emperor alone could grant exemption.

The term was also used from the 4th century for the heavy transport vehicles of the cursus publicus and the draft animals which pulled them. It came to mean any compulsory service (cf. levy) or oppression in medieval Latin, Byzantine Greek, and old Bulgarian. In modern Greek and modern Bulgarian, it means any service or task only grudgingly undertaken by the one forced to perform it.

== See also ==
- Angary
- Royal Road
- Angarum
