= Post house (historical building) =

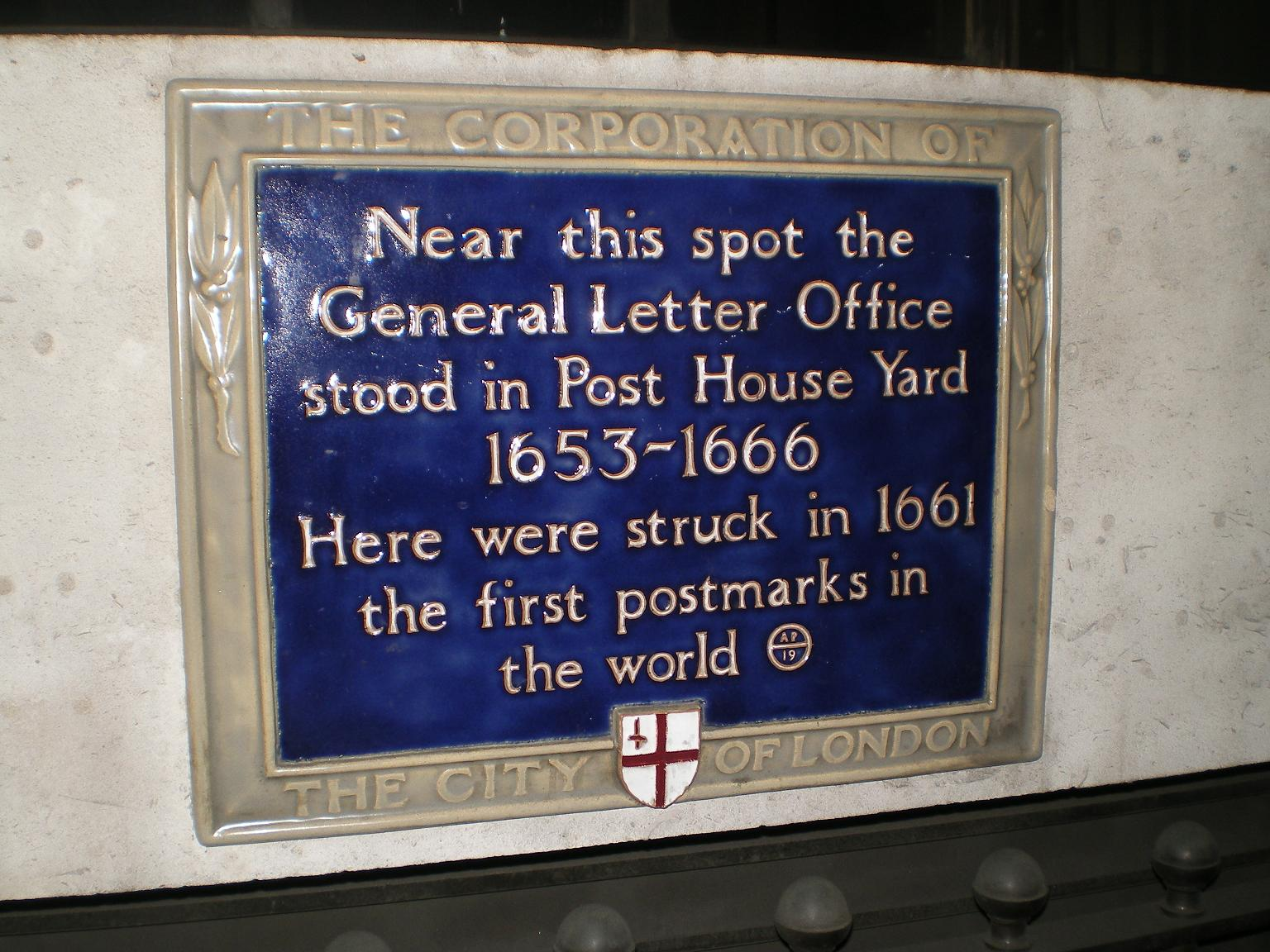

A post house, posthouse, or posting house was a house or inn where horses were kept and could be rented or changed out. Postriders could also be hired to take travellers by carriage or coach and delivered mail and packages on a route, meeting up at various places according to a schedule. Routes included post roads. A postmaster was an individual from whom horses and/or riders known as postilions or "post-boys" who might help a coachman drive coaches could be hired. A postilion might also travel on a coach to take back his employer's horses. The postmaster would reside in the post house.

Post houses functioned as the post offices of their day as national mail services came later.

== History ==
Organised systems of posthouses providing swift mounted courier service seems quite ancient, although sources vary as to precisely who initiated the practice. By the time of the Achaemenid Empire, a system of Chapar Khaneh existed along the Royal Road in Persia. The second-century BC Mauryan and Han empires established similar systems in India and China. Suetonius credited Augustus with regularising the Roman network, the cursus publicus. Local officials were obliged to provide couriers who would be responsible for their message's entire course. Locally maintained post houses (Latin: stationes) or privately owned rest houses (Latin: mansiones) were obliged or honored to care for them along their way. Diocletian later established two parallel systems: one providing fresh horses or mules for urgent correspondence and another providing sturdy oxen for bulk shipments. Procopius, though not unbiased, records that this system remained largely intact until it was dismantled in the surviving empire by Justinian in the 6th Century.

=== Europe ===
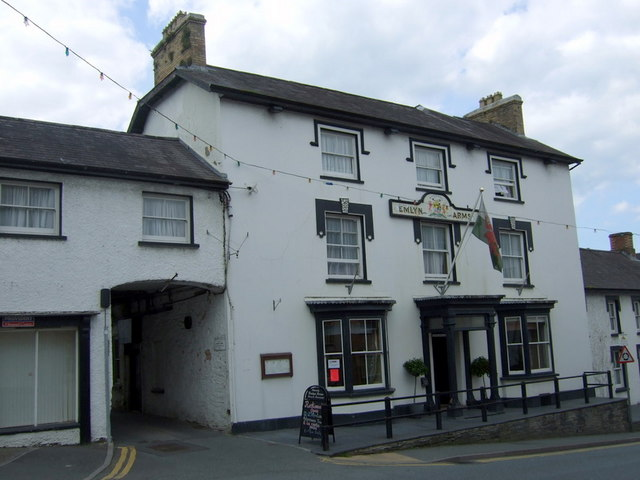
The Emlyn Arms a former posthouse in Newcastle Emlyn, Wales

In early modern England, post riders – mounted couriers – were placed ("posted") every few hours along post roads at posting houses or post houses between major cities (post towns). These stables or coaching inns permitted important correspondence to travel without delay. In early America, post offices were also known as "stations". This term and post house fell from use as horse and mail coach service was replaced by rail transport, railway post offices, aircraft, airmail, and automobiles including mail trucks.

The Four Swans Inn in Waltham Cross, Hertfordshire was one of the original post houses set up in the 1500s where men carrying mail, and later the regular mail coaches, could change horses. It was demolished in the late 1960s to make way for the Pavilion shopping centre and multi storey car park.
