= Posthouse =

Posthouse may refer to:

- Post office
- Alternative written form of Post house (historical building)
