= Postal worker =

Person who works for a post office

Mail Carrier at work.

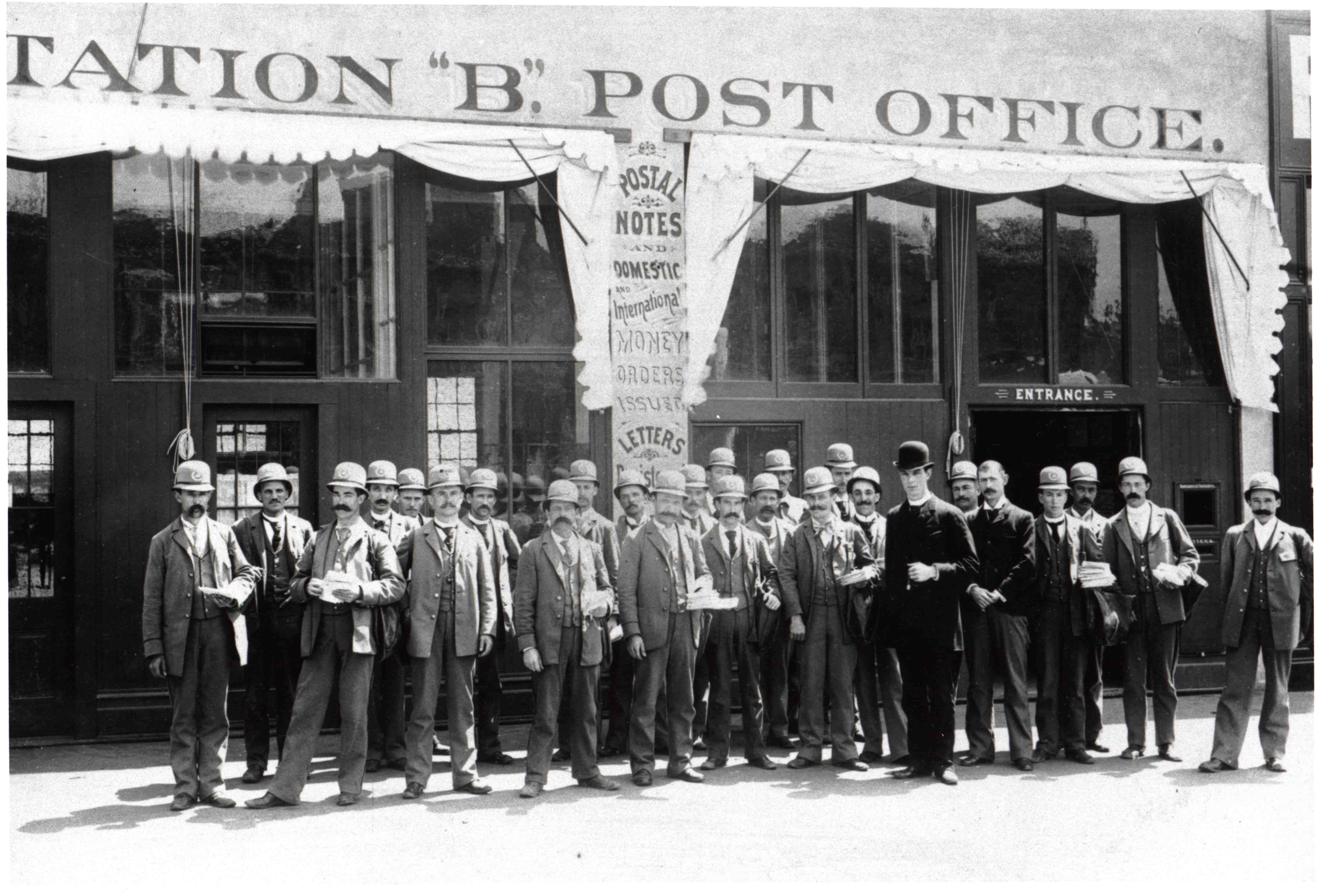
Postal workers in San Francisco, 1890

A postal worker is one who works for a post office, such as a mail carrier. In the U.S., postal workers are represented by the National Association of Letter Carriers, AFL–CIO, National Postal Mail Handlers Union – NPMHU, the National Association of Rural Letter Carriers and the American Postal Workers Union, part of the AFL–CIO. In Canada, they are represented by the Canadian Union of Postal Workers and in the United Kingdom by the Communication Workers Union.

The US Postal Service employs around 584,000 people. The bulk of these work as:

- Service clerks – Sell stamps and postage, help people pick up packages and assist with other services such as passports.
- Mail sorters – Physically sort the mail to go to the correct place. As automation has become more common, some of these people now operate the sorting machines.
- Mail carriers – Deliver the mail. In densely populated areas this is done on foot. In urban areas the carriers often use a mail truck and drive and walk different parts of their routes. In rural areas, carriers drive to most of their stops.
- Vehicle Operator – Drive the truck/vehicle carrying mails/pallets and dispatch from one place to another.

The phrase was not very often used until a spate of workplace violence incidents by postal workers in the mid-1990s made headlines; the incidents led to the coining of the phrase "going postal".

== Notable postal workers ==
- Charles Bukowski, writer and poet
- John Prine, American country folk singer-songwriter

== Postal workers in fiction ==
- The Postman
- Postman Pat
- Mr. McFeely
- Cliff Clavin
- Jacob Singer
- Newman (Seinfeld character)
- The Postman Always Rings Twice

== See also ==
- United States Postal Service creed
