= Moynihan Train Hall =

Expansion of New York Penn Station (opened 2021)

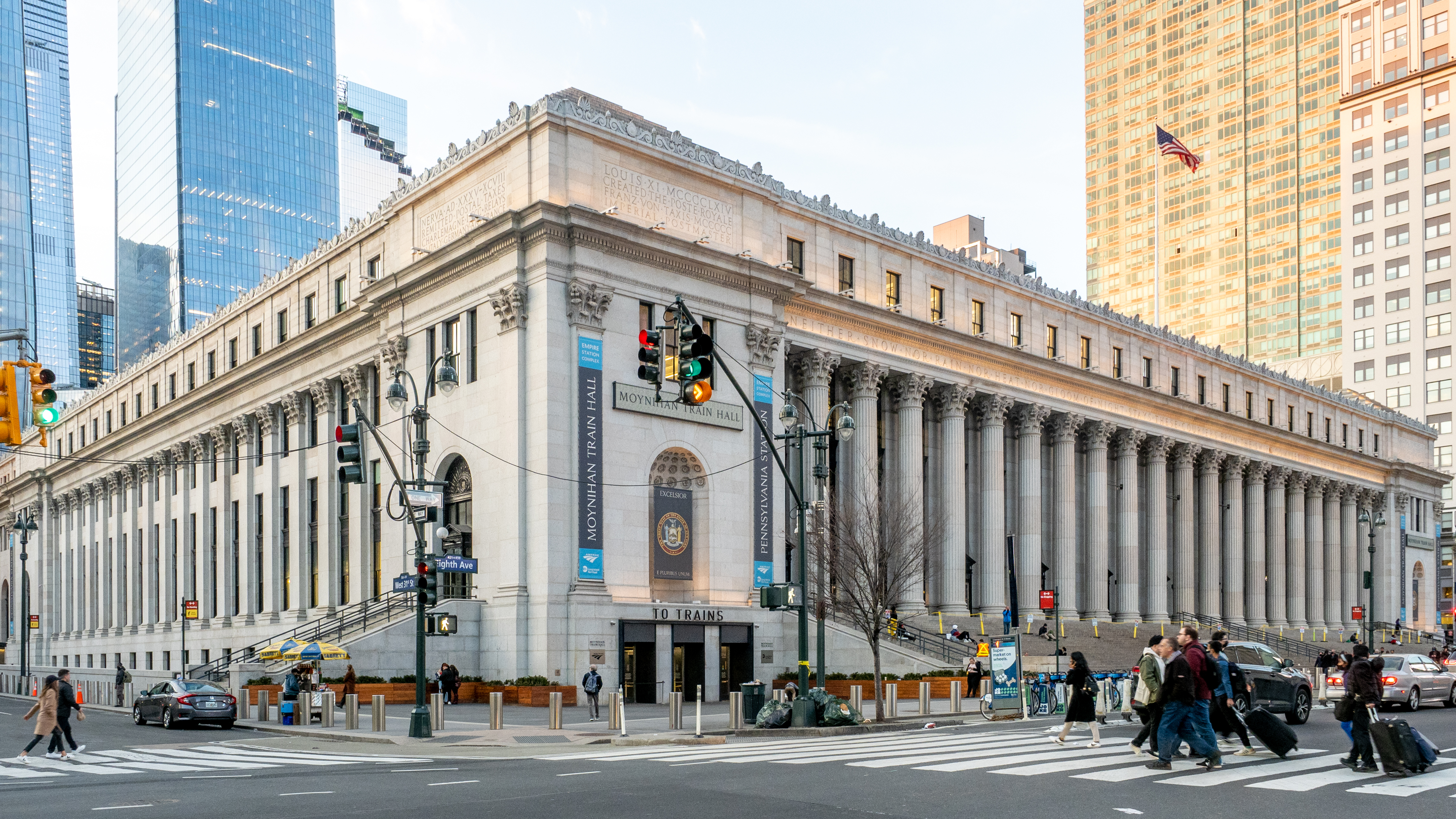
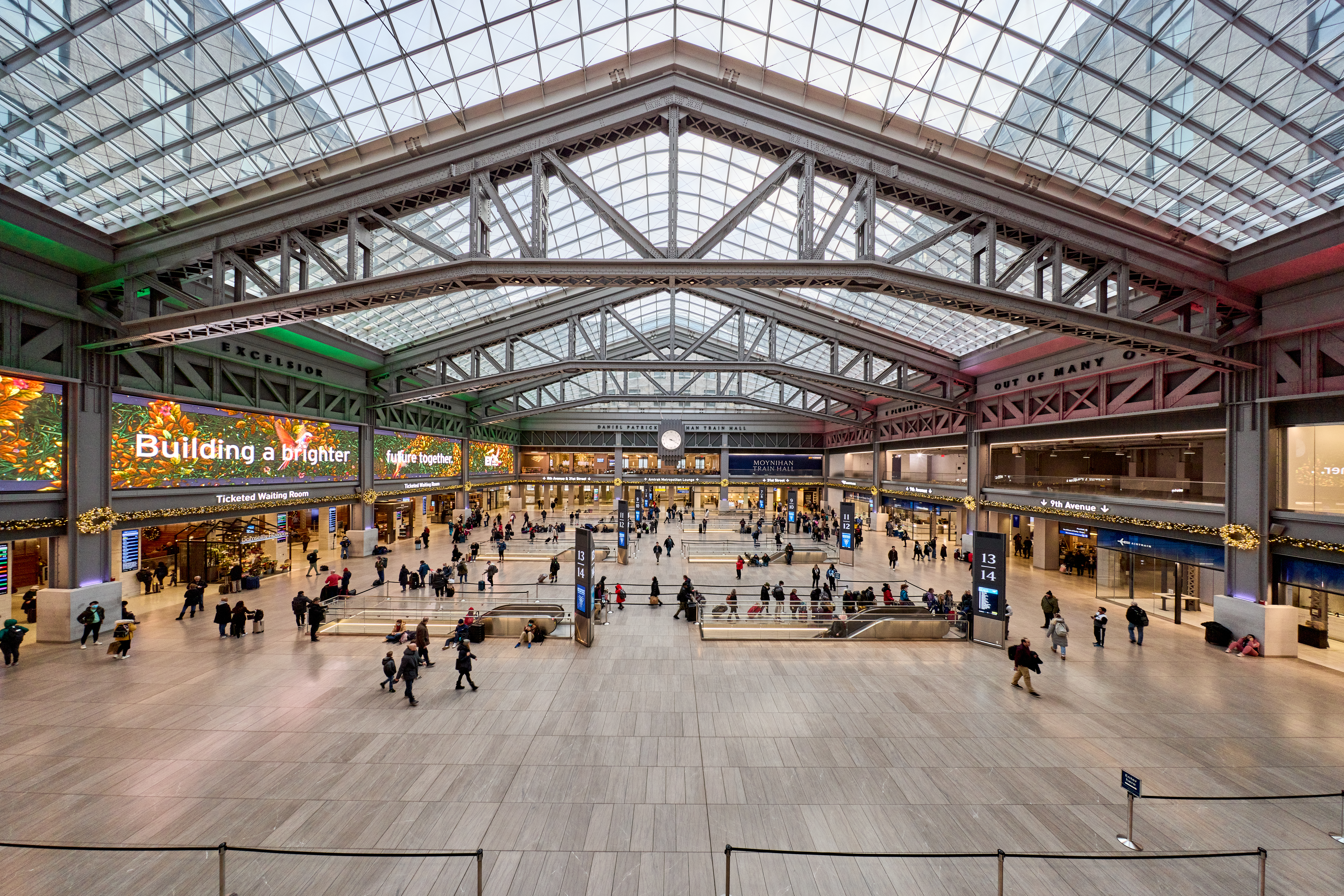
- Exterior of the historic James A. Farley Building, which houses the Moynihan Train Hall Concourse
- Building: James A. Farley Building
- Location: 421 8th Avenue, New York City
- Coordinates: 40°45′04″N 73°59′43″W
- Area: 255,000 sq ft (23,700 m^{2}); 31,000 sq ft (2,900 m^{2}) hall
- Purpose: Headhouse and concourse
- Owner: State of New York
- Operator: Amtrak, Long Island Rail Road, NJ Transit; Future: Metro-North Railroad
- Dedicated: January 1, 2021
- Named for: Daniel Patrick Moynihan
- Architect: Skidmore, Owings & Merrill
- Website: moynihantrainhall.nyc

Moynihan Train Hall is the head house serving the western end of Pennsylvania Station, the main intercity and commuter rail station in New York City. It occupies part of the James A. Farley Building, the city's former main post office in Midtown Manhattan, a designated landmark that occupies the city block bounded by Eighth Avenue, Ninth Avenue, 31st Street, and 33rd Street. The train hall provides access to 17 of Penn Station's 21 tracks: all of the Amtrak and Long Island Rail Road platforms but none of the ones that serve NJ Transit. The hall is named for Daniel Patrick Moynihan, the U.S. senator who originally championed the redevelopment project. The Farley Building's Beaux-Arts exterior resembles that of the original Penn Station; both buildings were designed by the architectural firm of McKim, Mead & White.

The train hall was built to alleviate congestion in Penn Station, which saw 650,000 daily riders before the COVID-19 pandemic in 2020. The $1.6 billion renovation produced a 486,000 ft^{2} (45,200 m^{2}) complex. Besides restoring portions of the Farley Building, the project added a central atrium with a glass roof, retail space, a 320-seat waiting area for ticket-holding passengers, and public restrooms. The hall is decorated with three artworks: a ceiling triptych named Go, a group of photographic panels, and a sculptural group.

Initial blueprints for the project were made public in 1993, but it took years to line up funding. Amtrak withdrew as a tenant in 2004, but returned after the Farley Building was sold to the New York state government in 2006. A first phase that expanded a concourse under the Farley Building started in 2010 and was completed in 2017, the year that saw the start of construction of the train hall. It opened on January 1, 2021.

== Description ==
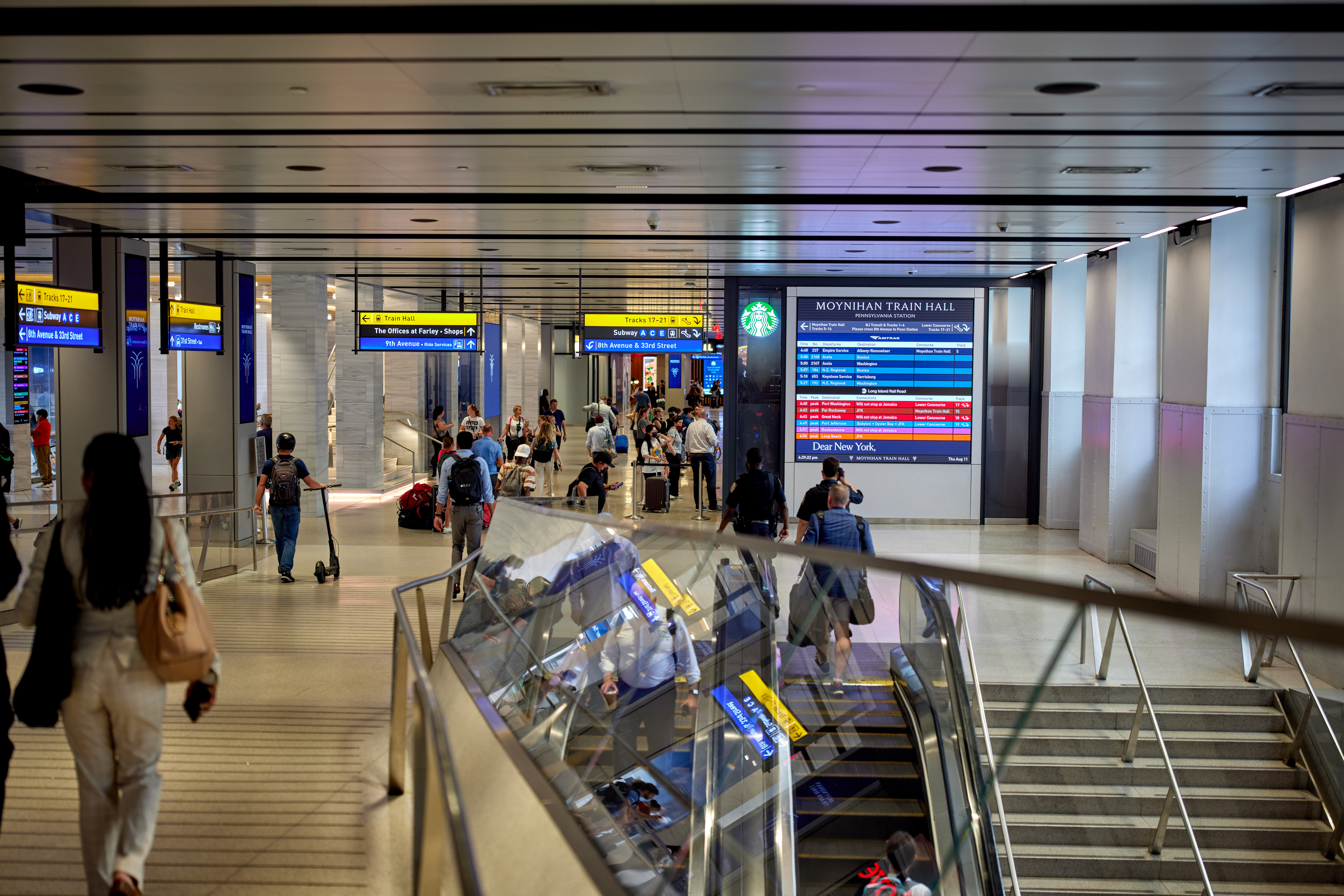
Entering the Hall from Penn Station

Moynihan Train Hall occupies part of the James A. Farley Building, a Beaux-Arts structure designed by McKim, Mead & White alongside the original Penn Station, and opened in 1914 as New York City's main post office. The building occupies the block across Eighth Avenue from the current Penn Station facilities, and is bounded by Eighth Avenue to the east, 31st Street to the south, Ninth Avenue to the west, and 33rd Street to the north. The James A. Farley Building is a New York City designated landmark and is listed on the National Register of Historic Places. The train hall occupies a portion of the post office's mail sorting hall, while most of the rest of the building is leased by Meta Platforms as office space.

=== Components ===
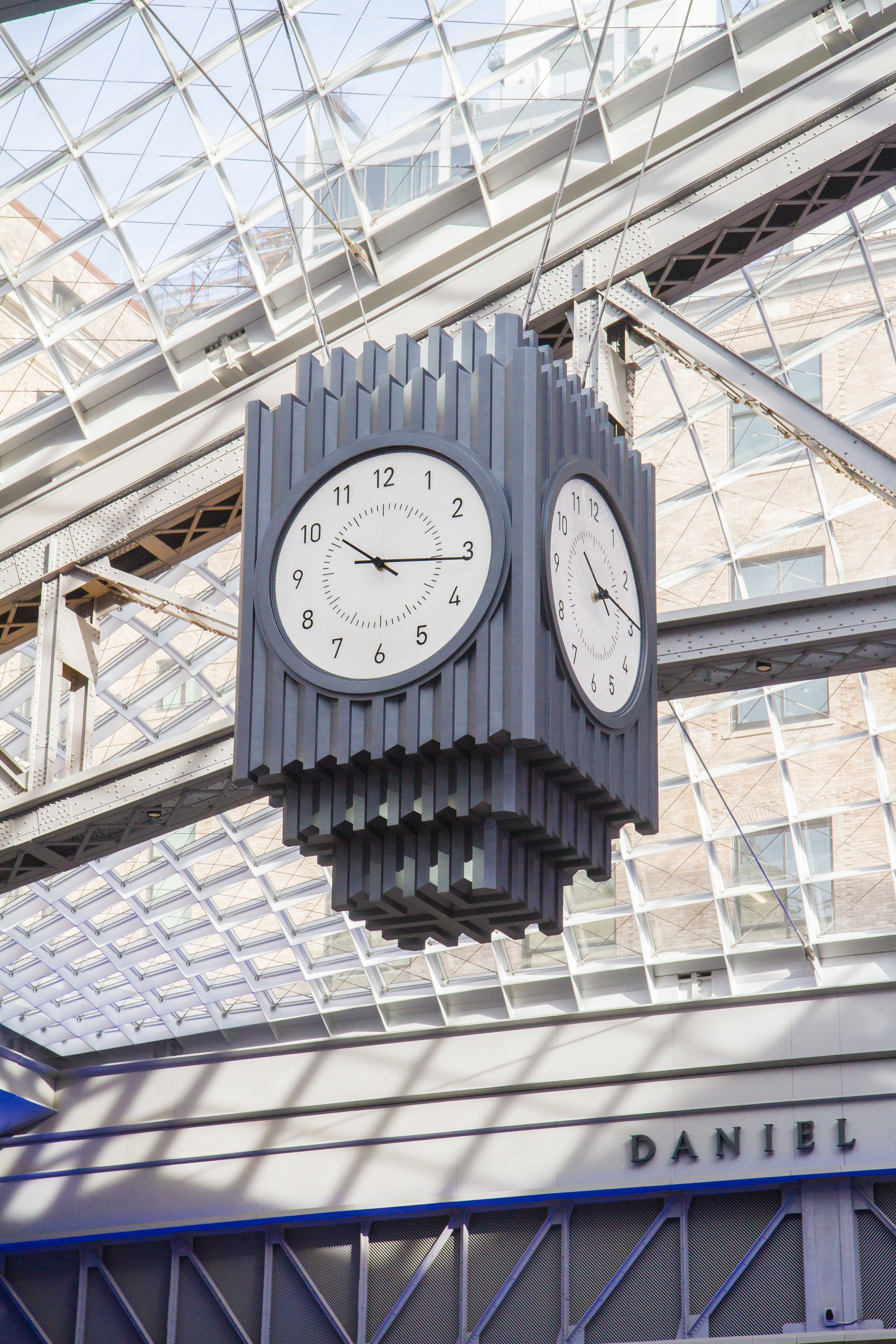
Headhouse clock

The 486,000 sq ft (45,200 m^{2}) complex was designed by Skidmore, Owings & Merrill (SOM). It consists of a 31,000 ft^{2} (2,900 m^{2}) passenger concourse underneath a 92 ft (28 m) tall glass skylight. A four-faced clock, measuring 12 feet (3.7 m) tall and more than 6 feet (1.8 m) across each of its sides, is at the center of the passenger concourse. The hall also includes 120,000 ft^{2} (11,000 m^{2}) of retail space. Moynihan Train Hall contains passenger facilities for Amtrak, its primary tenant. These include a ticketing and baggage area, a waiting lounge, conference spaces, and a balcony 20 ft (6.1 m) above the hall.

As part of the Moynihan Train Hall Public Art Program, several pieces of temporary and permanent artwork are presented at the hall, including video art on digital advertising screens. The space contains three permanent artworks. Kehinde Wiley designed a stained-glass triptych on the ceiling, named Go. Along an 80-foot (24 m) stretch of wall, Stan Douglas's photographic panels, Penn Station's Half Century, depicts passengers of the original Penn Station. At the 31st Street entrance, Elmgreen & Dragset created a sculptural group, The Hive, that depicts skyscrapers hanging from the ceiling.

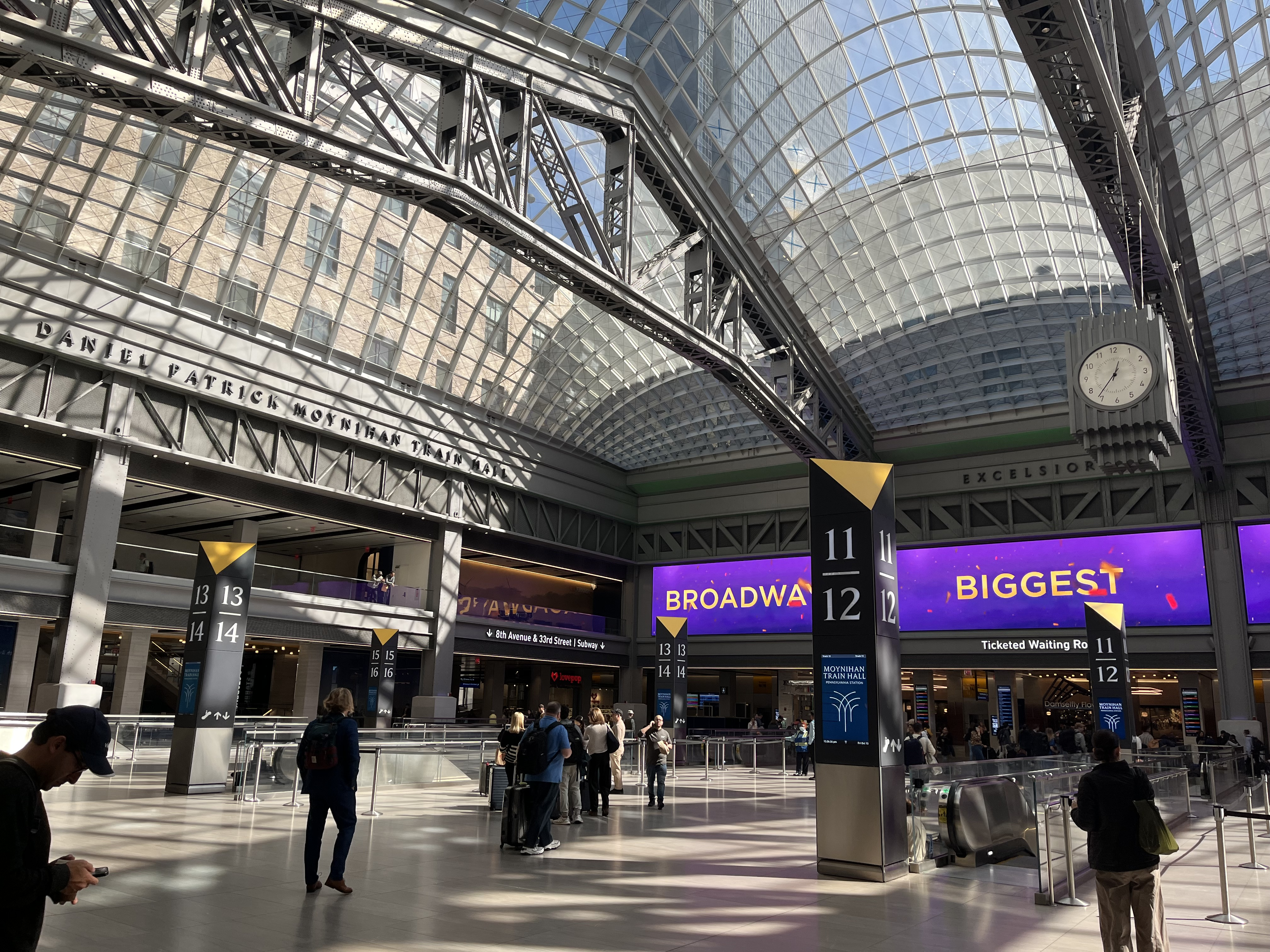
The hall's skylight

Part of the Moynihan Train Hall project is an expansion of the preexisting West End Concourse under the eastern side of the Farley Building. Located under the grand staircase of the post office, the concourse was widened to serve nine of Pennsylvania Station's 11 platforms, and new street entrances were opened from the southeast and northeast corners of the Farley Building. The concourse, which was constructed in 1994 as part of a renovation to the LIRR's section of Penn Station, provides access to the 17 tracks served by Moynihan Train Hall. Its walls are decorated with depictions of New York City buildings and landscapes. The West End Concourse expansion, which was completed in 2017, was the first part of Moynihan Train Hall to be completed.

=== Service ===
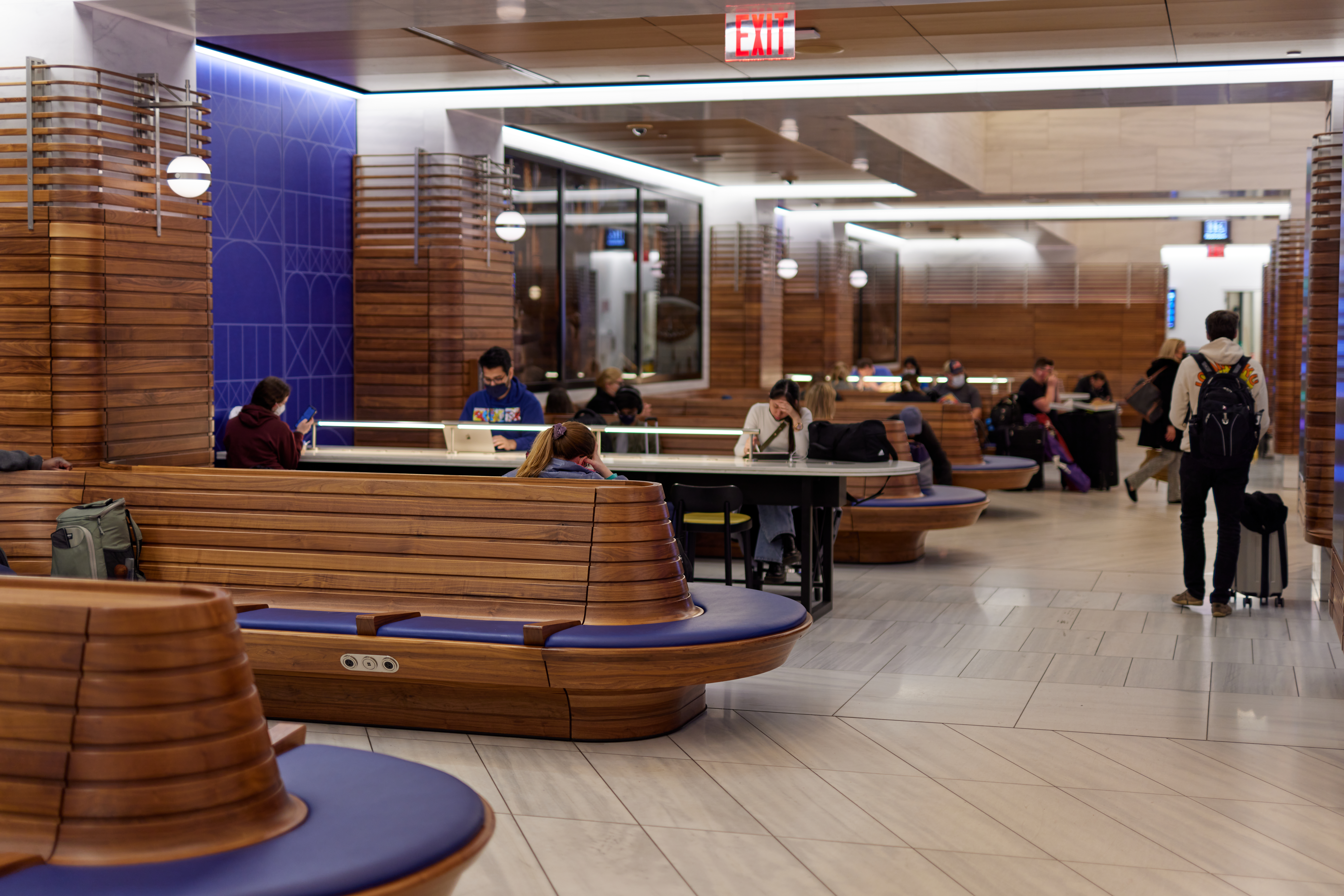
Waiting room within the hall

Moynihan Train Hall serves 17 of Penn Station's 21 tracks, which are used by Long Island Rail Road (LIRR) and Amtrak. Platforms serving the southernmost four tracks, used by NJ Transit, could not be extended to the new facility. Moynihan Train Hall provides access to all LIRR and Amtrak services, with customer service facilities for both railroads. The existing station also provides access to the LIRR and Amtrak, particularly during the nighttime hours when Moynihan Train Hall is closed. Plans call for the facility to serve the Metro-North Railroad, the main commuter railroad for New York City's northern suburbs, when the Penn Station Access project is complete.

The completion of the hall increased the amount of space in Penn Station's concourse by half.

The train hall was meant to alleviate congestion in Penn Station, which saw 650,000 daily riders before the onset of the COVID-19 pandemic in 2020. Officials anticipated that it would be used primarily by Amtrak passengers, who made up about five percent of daily ridership before the pandemic. Most LIRR, NJ Transit, and New York City Subway customers were expected to continue using the old passenger facilities, which are closer to the adjoining subway stations at Seventh Avenue and Eighth Avenue.

== Planning ==
=== 1990s ===
Proposed designs throughout the development process, from 1999 (left), 2005 (middle), and 2006 (right)

In the early 1990s, U.S. senator Daniel Patrick Moynihan began championing a plan to rebuild a replica of the historic Penn Station, in which he had shined shoes during the Great Depression. He proposed rebuilding the station in the Farley Post Office building. At the time, existing facilities at Penn Station were overcrowded and the United States Postal Service (USPS) was planning to move much of its operation from the Farley Post Office. Hellmuth, Obata & Kassabaum (HOK)'s plan, which was made public in May 1993, called for a 120-foot parabolic arched roof, rising above a passenger concourse within the post office's old sorting room. Moynihan sought $100 million for the project, and U.S. president Bill Clinton included $10 million in federal money for the station as part of a bill to provide relief for victims of the 1994 Northridge earthquake. However, the House of Representatives would not approve any more funding, and the Senate only approved $40 million, bringing the total amount raised to $50 million. Opponents, including Republican representatives Frank R. Wolf of Virginia and Harris W. Fawell of Illinois, said that the funds had not been authorized in Amtrak's budget, and expressed concern that the city and state might not be able to raise matching funds. The $10 million appropriation was used to fund design work, and the additional $40 million was used to buy supplies and renovate existing facilities.

The Empire State Development Corporation, an agency of the New York state government, created the Pennsylvania Station Redevelopment Corporation in 1995 to oversee the purchase and renovation of the building. The corporation, led by a bipartisan group of New York state government officials, initially had $300,000, but raised $670 million within ten years. Officials of the corporation were reviewing plans by 1998, when the Clinton administration included $11.7 million for the project in a budget submitted to Congress. By that March, officials had formed an agreement in which the USPS would retain its operations in part of the Farley Building while giving over another portion to the new train hall. Three months later, the Pennsylvania Station Redevelopment Corporation selected SOM and Parsons Brinckerhoff to lead the engineering team that would design and build Penn Station facilities within the Farley Building.

An agreement on the general layout was reached in December 1998. At the time, the train hall was projected to open in December 2002 at a cost of $315 million. David Childs of SOM presented another design for the Farley train hall. Childs's design would have involved demolishing the post office's sorting room floor and replacing it with a multilevel concourse that allowed views of the tracks. A skylight would have been installed; the original trusses of the roof would have been preserved, and the remainder of the roof would have been taken apart. An intermodal hall would have extended from 31st to 33rd Street, bisecting the Farley Building. One wall of the intermodal hall would have included a curved truss measuring 150 feet (46 m) high. The Farley project was expected to cost $488 million; the city government only offered $25 million, and New York City mayor Rudy Giuliani expressed concerns that the project could encounter cost overruns. Congress provided $60 million in additional funding later in 1999. U.S. senator Charles Schumer had unsuccessfully sponsored a bill that May, which would have formally named the facility "Daniel Patrick Moynihan Station", in honor of his colleague who was retiring.

=== 2000s ===
By February 2000, the budget had increased to $788 million, of which $188 million would be required for upgrades to existing infrastructure. At the time, construction was expected to start later the same year. In early 2001, the Staubach Company and Fraport were selected to develop the Farley train hall as a joint venture; the start of construction had been pushed back yet again to late 2001. The USPS had pledged a $150 million contribution to the Farley project, but was facing financial problems by June 2001. Following the September 11 attacks in 2001, the USPS halted funding for capital improvements to its facilities, although the agency maintained that it was still interested. The USPS facility at 90 Church Street in Lower Manhattan had been damaged by the attacks, and many of 90 Church Street's operations had been moved to the Farley Building. Negotiations resumed in mid-2002. By that October, the New York state government had arranged to buy the Farley Building from the USPS for $230 million, with the USPS vacating much of the building.

Amtrak was intended to be Moynihan Station's main tenant, but withdrew in 2004, citing that it could not pay rent at the new station because of financial shortfalls. State officials continued to search for partners in the train hall development, and had selected two anchor retail tenants by that October. Another plan was presented by James Carpenter Design Associates, in collaboration with HOK, in 2005. The Carpenter and HOK plan simplified the concourse into a single level and added numerous skylights, reminiscent of the original Penn Station. This plan would have involved turning part of the post office building into a hotel with windows overlooking the interior courtyard.

NJ Transit would have replaced Amtrak as the main tenant. This plan for Moynihan Station would have cost $818 million and contained 300,000 square feet (28,000 m^{2}) for rail uses, 850,000 square feet (79,000 m^{2}) for retail, and 250,000 square feet (23,000 m^{2}) for the post office. The Empire State Development Corporation selected Vornado Realty Trust and The Related Companies to operate the retail space. The project would be constructed in conjunction with the Access to the Region's Core project, which would have expanded NJ Transit service under the Hudson River. The 14th Dalai Lama, a longtime friend of Moynihan, expressed support for Moynihan Station.

The Farley Post Office building was sold to the New York state government in 2006 in the hope that Moynihan's vision would be realized. Support also grew for "Plan B", an expansion of the project's scope, under which Madison Square Garden, which is directly atop Penn Station, would have been moved to the west flank of the Farley Building, allowing Vornado Realty to construct an office complex on the current Garden site. By 2009, the Garden's owner Cablevision had decided to renovate its current location instead of moving the arena. That September, after months of negotiations involving Senator Chuck Schumer, New York governor David Paterson, and PANYNJ Executive Director Christopher O. Ward, Amtrak agreed to return as a potential tenant. In exchange, some aspects of the design were changed, and Amtrak was to take a part of the retail revenue.

== Construction ==
=== Phase 1 ===
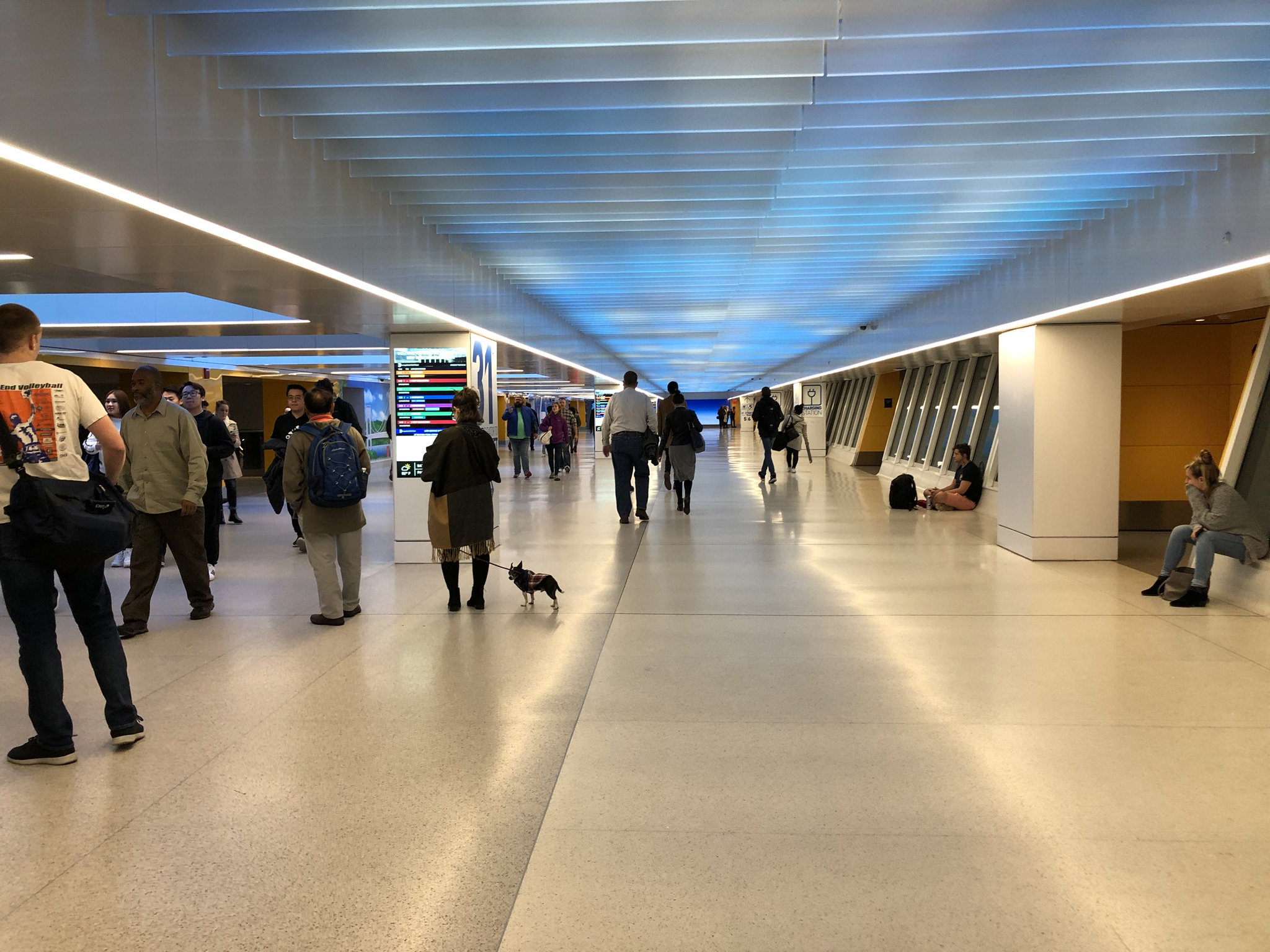
New passageway as part of Phase 1

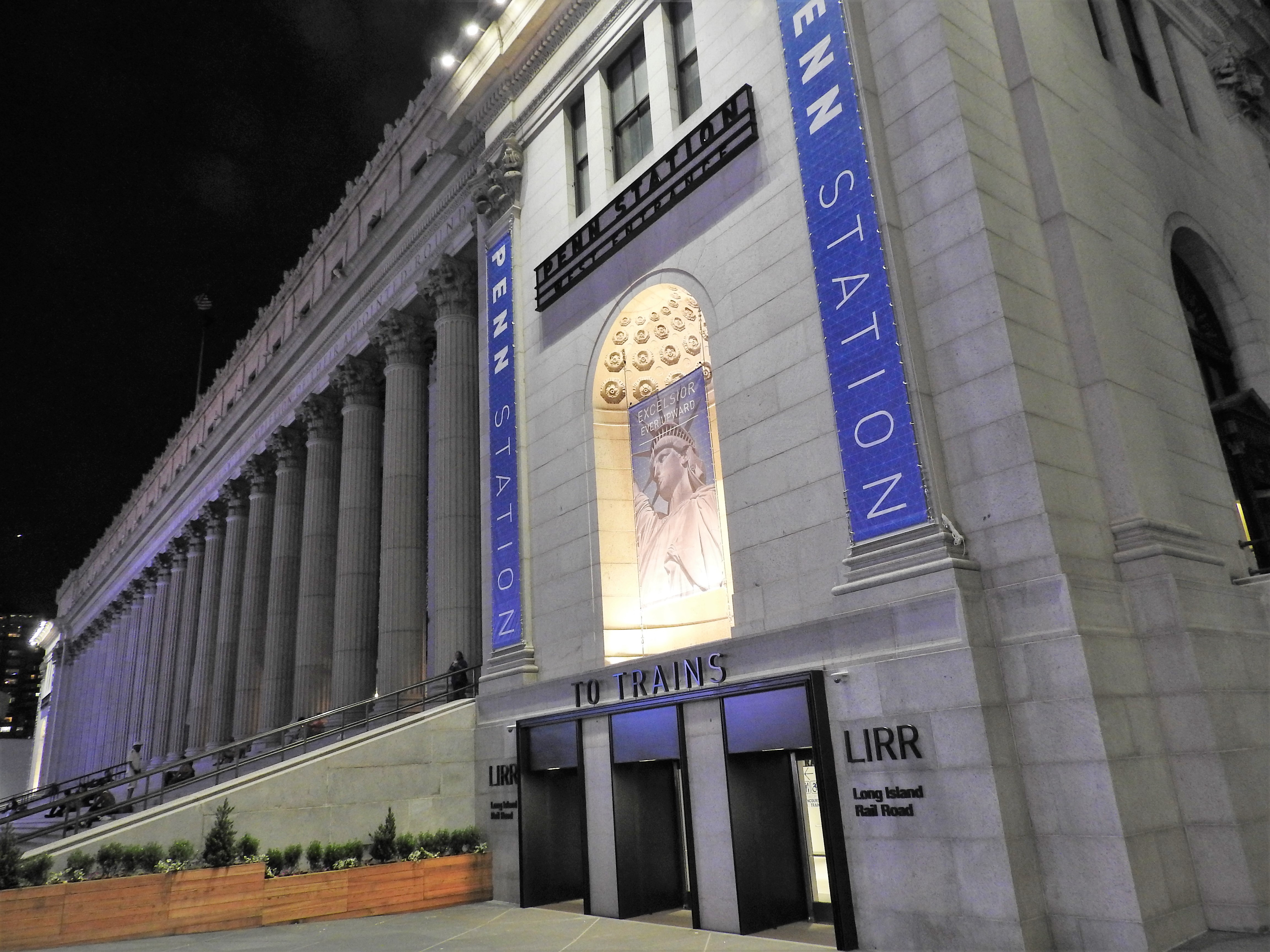
Entrances on Eighth Avenue, seen in 2017

Some $169 million provided by federal and state sources was already in place when a Transportation Investment Generating Economic Recovery (TIGER) Grant arrived in early 2010. This money was used to pay for the $267 million Phase 1; most of the remaining funds came from $83.4 million of stimulus money from the American Recovery and Reinvestment Act of 2009. Phase 1 consisted of the two fully-designed elements of the plan: an extended underground West End Concourse for the Long Island Rail Road and two entrances to the existing Penn Station platforms through the Farley Building on Eighth Avenue. A groundbreaking ceremony took place on October 18, 2010.

In May 2012, the Port Authority of New York and New Jersey (PANYNJ) announced that a $270 million contract for the first phase, including the concourse expansion under 8th Avenue, had been awarded. The $147.7 million construction contract for the expansion of the existing concourse was awarded to Skanska USA Civil Northeast. The work consisted of adding stairs, escalators, and elevators to the concourse. The West End Concourse was projected to be completed in September 2016, and was projected to meet that schedule as late as one month before that deadline. However, the opening was delayed because the New York state government decided to upgrade digital information boards and other technology in the concourse just before it was completed. The West End Concourse finally opened in June 2017.

=== Phase 2 ===
Phase 2 consisted of the new train hall in the fully renovated Farley Building. In December 2011, Amtrak said it would likely be unable to afford increased operating costs if it should move. The unsuccessful application left the project unfunded. The agency redeveloping the building was folded into the PANYNJ in the belief that it could better handle and oversee reconstruction as well as provide or secure money.

Phase 2 was initially expected to cost up to $1.5 billion. In January 2016, New York Governor Cuomo announced plans for a $3 billion combined Penn-Farley Post Office complex. SOM said that it had decided to resume work on the train hall, which was renamed Moynihan Train Hall. By September 2016, Phase 2 was expected to cost $1.6 billion. The project was to be built by Skanska AB, and the retail space would be developed by The Related Companies and Vornado Realty. The companies signed a contract in June 2017. Vornado and Related leased the building for 99 years, and in exchange, contributed $630 million to the hall's construction. Public sources raised the remainder: $550 million from the New York state government plus $420 million from Amtrak, the Metropolitan Transportation Authority, the Port Authority of New York and New Jersey, and a federal grant.

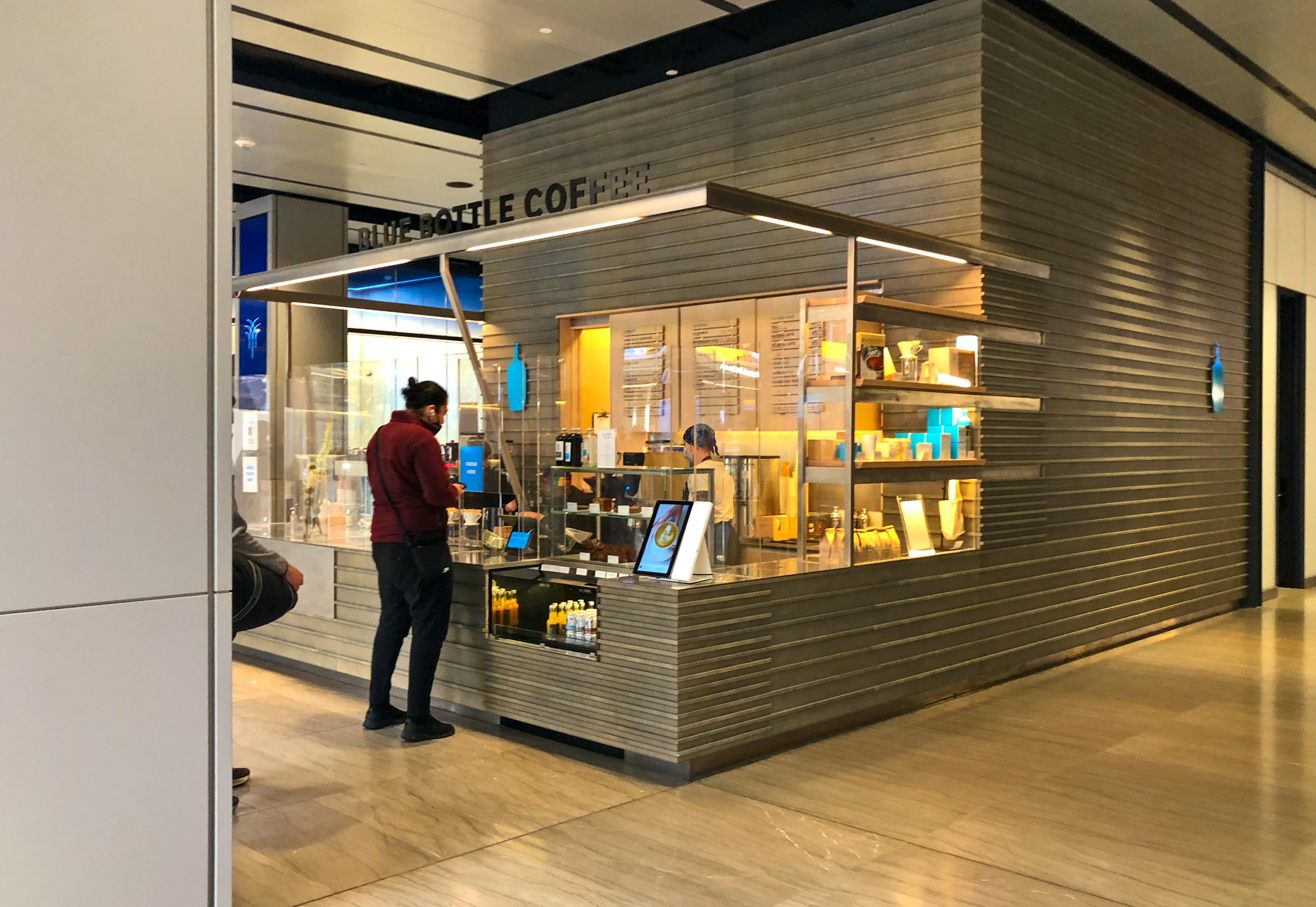
Blue Bottle Coffee stand in Moynihan Station, seen in 2021

In August 2017, a groundbreaking ceremony was held for the train hall. The work involved the restoration of the Farley Building's 200,000-square-foot (19,000 m^{2}) facade, protected as a city and national landmark. State officials aimed to complete the project by the end of 2020, under the leadership of Moynihan Station Development Corporation president Michael Evans. The state continued to push for a timely completion despite last-minute requests and budget issues, and the stress of the project may have led Evans to kill himself in March 2020. In spite of the COVID-19 pandemic in 2020, Moynihan Train Hall was completed by the end of that year.

=== Opening and further changes ===
An opening ceremony for the hall was held on December 30, 2020. Upon the completion of the project, New York governor Andrew Cuomo called it a "monumental accomplishment". The train hall opened to the public on January 1, 2021, two days after the opening ceremony. By early 2022, many of the shops in Moynihan Train Hall's food hall had opened. Within three years of the hall's opening, its eateries included a craft brewery within Amtrak's portion of the hall and an outpost of The Dead Rabbit pub. The hall also became a popular meeting spot for K-pop dance clubs.

On January 11, 2021, Cuomo announced a proposal to connect the High Line linear park, two blocks west, to the Moynihan Train Hall. The connection would include a 1,200-foot (370 m) spur, which would run along 30th Street and Dyer Avenue to Manhattan West, across Ninth Avenue from the train hall. At the time of the spur's announcement, it was estimated to cost $60 million, but was not funded. As of September 2021, the project was funded and projected to be completed in early 2023. The Moynihan Connector opened on June 22, 2023.

== Reception ==
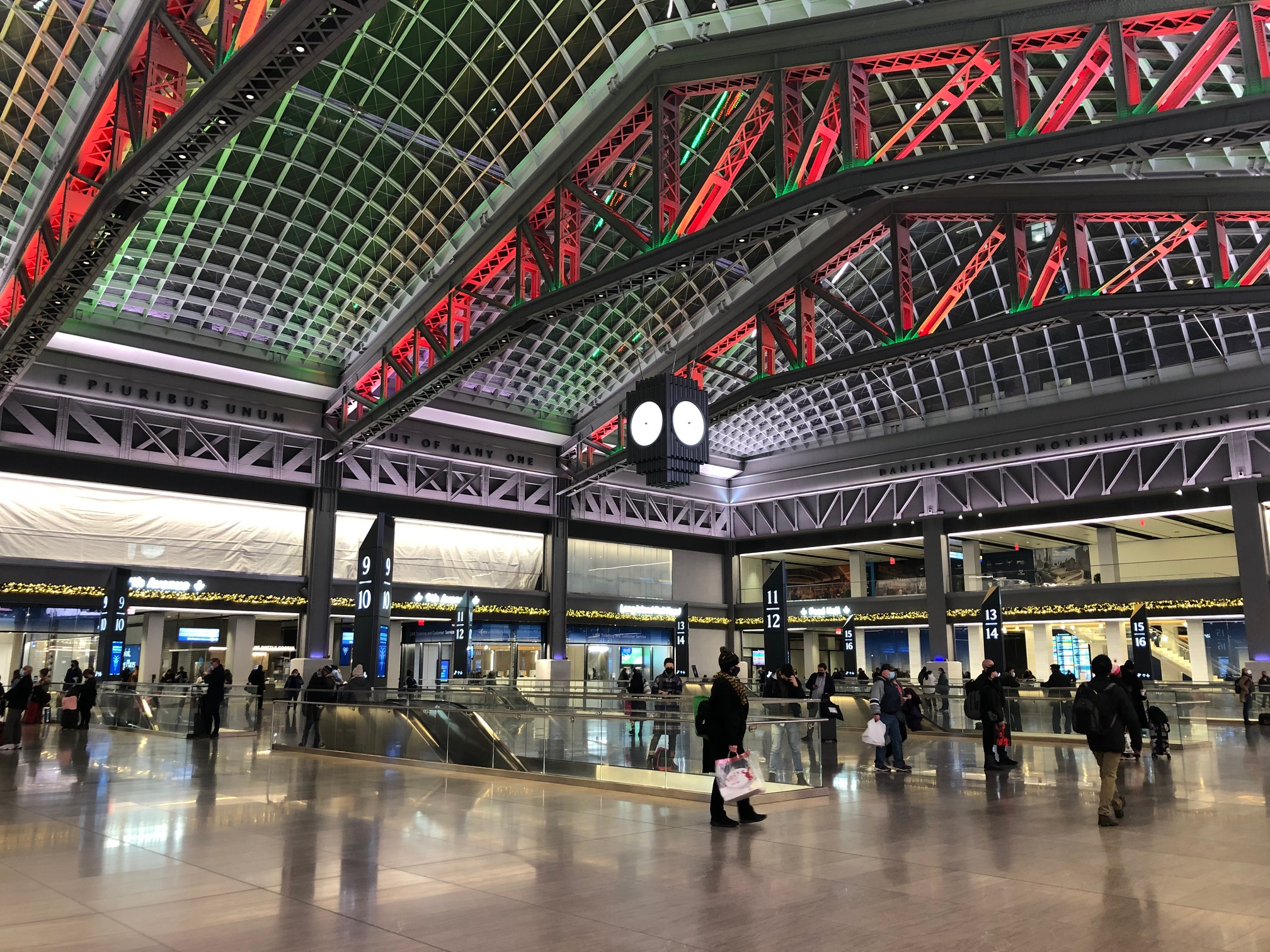
Moynihan Train Hall holiday lights display in 2021

In May 2022, the project received the American Council of Engineering Companies' Grand Conceptor Award, for the year's most outstanding engineering project. In June 2022, Open House New York conferred its 2022 Open City Award to the Moynihan Train Hall Team, which includes primary client Empire State Development in a public-private partnership with Vornado Realty Trust, architect Skidmore, Owings & Merrill, WSP USA (construction management), Skanska USA (construction), Severud Associates (structural engineering), Jaros, Baum & Bolles (MEP/FP/IT/Telecom), Langan (civil/geotechnical engineering) and several other specialty designers and contractors.

The Moynihan Train Hall has drawn criticism for its lack of public seating in the main areas. Seats are available only in the waiting areas for ticketed passengers. People sometimes sit on the main hall floor while waiting for trains, which security officers sometimes prohibit. Officials have said the lack of seating is meant to improve the "circulation" of people, but critics have argued it is hostile architecture intended to keep away homeless people. In the year after the train hall opened, several politicians, including U.S. representative Jerrold Nadler and Manhattan borough president Mark Levine, asked the MTA and Amtrak to install seats in the main portion of the hall.

Other critics note the hall's lack of large central signage, and the fact that Penn Station's track capacity is unchanged.

== See also ==
- Gateway Program (Northeast Corridor)
- Penn Station Access, scheduled to link Metro-North trains to Moynihan Hall in 2027
- Pennsylvania Tunnel and Terminal Railroad
- Transportation in New York City
