= United States Postal Service creed =

Informal motto of American letter carriers

"Neither snow nor rain nor heat nor gloom of night stays these couriers from the swift completion of their appointed rounds" is a phrase long associated with the American postal worker. Though not an official creed or motto of the United States Postal Service, the Postal Service does acknowledge it as an informal motto along with a slightly revised version of Charles W. Eliot's poem "The Letter".

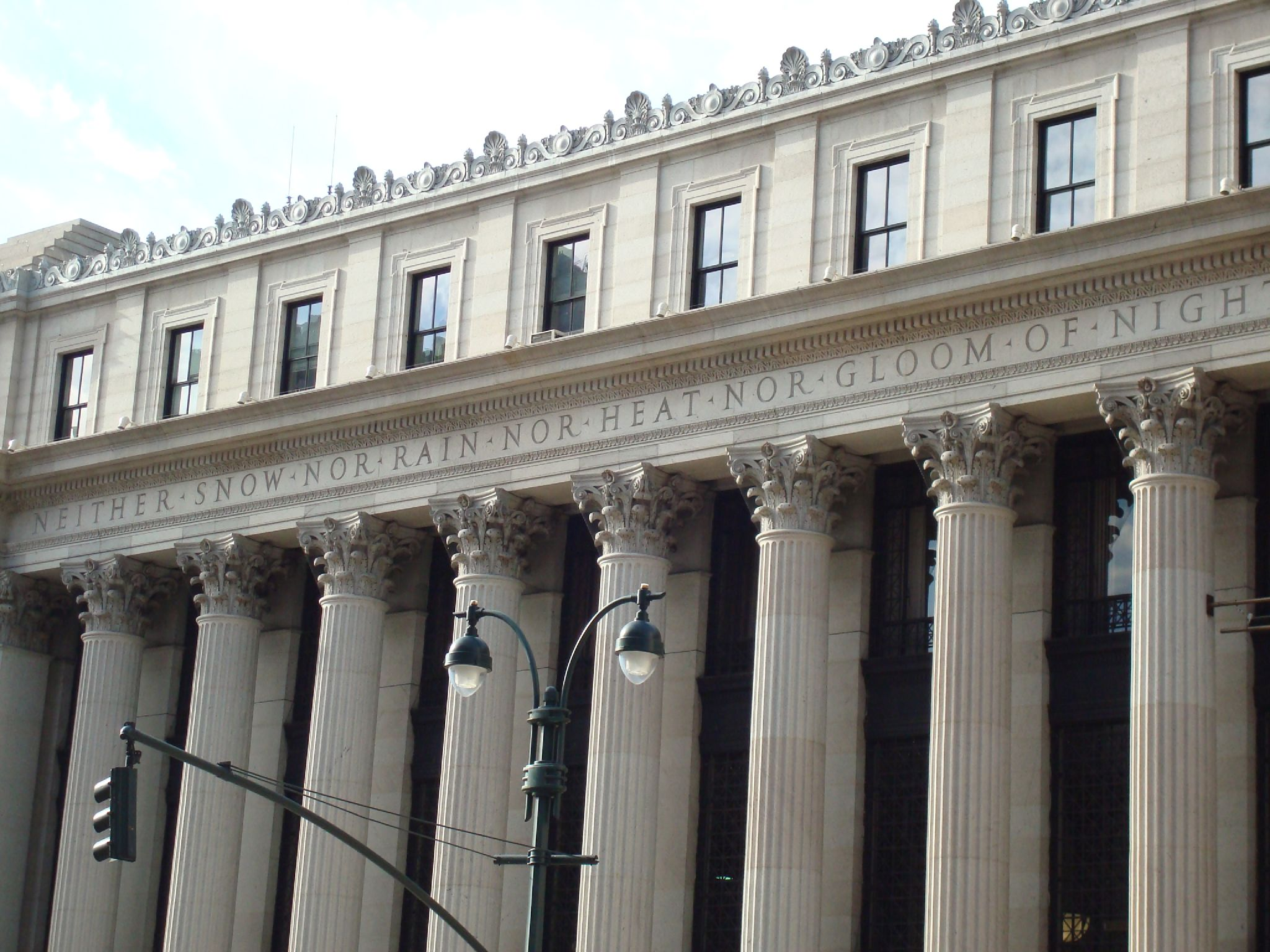
The beginning of the inscription on James Farley Post Office

The phrase's association with the U.S. Mail originated with its inscription on New York City's James A. Farley Post Office Building, which opened in 1914. The inscription was added to the building by William M. Kendall of the architectural firm of McKim, Mead & White, the building's architects.

The phrase derives from a passage in George Herbert Palmer's translation of Herodotus's Histories, referring to the courier service of the ancient Persian Empire:

λέγουσι γὰρ ὡς ὁσέων ἂν ἡμερέων ᾖ ἡ πᾶσα ὁδός, τοσοῦτοι ἵπποι τε καὶ ἄνδρες διεστᾶσι κατὰ ἡμερησίην ὁδὸν ἑκάστην ἵππος τε καὶ ἀνὴρ τεταγμένος: τοὺς οὔτε νιφετός, οὐκ ὄμβρος, οὐ καῦμα, οὐ νὺξ ἔργει μὴ οὐ κατανύσαι τὸν προκείμενον αὐτῷ δρόμον τὴν ταχίστην.

Translation:

It is said that as many days as there are in the whole journey, so many are the men and horses that stand along the road, each horse and man at the interval of a day’s journey; and these are stayed neither by snow nor rain nor heat nor darkness from accomplishing their appointed course with all speed.

This slogan is not a formal commitment, and in fact the USPS may delay mail during bad weather.
