= Chapar Khaneh =

Postal service used in the Achaemenid Persian Empire

A Chapar Khaneh (Persian: چاپارخانه, IPA: [tʃɒːˈpɒːɾ xɒːˈne], transl. 'courier house') was a postal service station in the Achaemenid Empire.

Established by Cyrus the Great and later developed by Darius the Great, the Achaemenid Empire's extensive postal service network served as the principal royal method of communication across most of the major cities of the ancient Near East. Each Chapar Khaneh was mainly located along the Royal Road, an ancient highway that was reorganized and rebuilt by Darius the Great to facilitate the rapid movement of Persian couriers between Sardis (now Turkey) in the west and Susa (now Iran) in the east.

The couriers, also known as angaros (ἄγγαρος) in Greek, alternated in stations a day's ride apart along the Royal Road. The riders were exclusively in service of the Great King, and the network allowed for messages to be transported from Susa to Sardis (2,700 km or 1,700 mi) in a matter of just nine days, as opposed to roughly 90 days on foot. Thus, a chapar was fundamentally an express courier; he would be provided with fresh supplies and horses at each station on his route, allowing him to greatly accelerate his journey by eliminating any delays associated with procuring supplies on his own or waiting for his horse to rest.

Known as the Angarium in Latin, the ancient Persians' postal system was hailed in the Greco-Roman world for its remarkable efficiency, consequently being adapted as the cursus publicus (lit. 'the public way') in the Roman Empire. Çaparhâne was used for the postal service, which provided official communication in the Ottoman Empire, and for the accommodation points of the army.

== In Herodotus ==
Herodotus, in about 440 BC, describes the Chapar Khaneh in the Histories. His description of the Royal Road and the various Chapar Khanehs along it is in Book V:

Now the true account of the road in question is the following: Royal stations exist along its whole length, and excellent caravanserais; and throughout, it traverses an inhabited tract, and is free from danger. In Lydia and Phrygia there are twenty stations within a distance of 94½ parasangs. On leaving Phrygia the Halys has to be crossed; and here are gates through which you must needs pass ere you can traverse the stream. A strong force guards this post. When you have made the passage, and are come into Cappadocia, 28 stations and 104 parasangs bring you to the borders of Cilicia, where the road passes through two sets of gates, at each of which there is a guard posted. Leaving these behind, you go on through Cilicia, where you find three stations in a distance of 15½ parasangs. The boundary between Cilicia and Armenia is the river Euphrates, which it is necessary to cross in boats. In Armenia the resting-places are 15 in number, and the distance is 56½ parasangs. There is one place where a guard is posted. Four large streams intersect this district, all of which have to be crossed by means of boats. The first of these is the Tigris; the second and the third have both of them the same name, though they are not only different rivers, but do not even run from the same place. For the one which I have called the first of the two has its source in Armenia, while the other flows afterwards out of the country of the Matienians. The fourth of the streams is called the Gyndes, and this is the river which Cyrus dispersed by digging for it three hundred and sixty channels. Leaving Armenia and entering the Matienian country, you have four stations; these passed you find yourself in Cissia, where eleven stations and 42½ parasangs bring you to another navigable stream, the Choaspes, on the banks of which the city of Susa is built. Thus the entire number of the stations is raised to one hundred and eleven; and so many are in fact the resting-places that one finds between Sardis and Susa.

In Book VIII, he describes the messengers:

Now there is nothing mortal which accomplishes a journey with more speed than these messengers, so skillfully has this been invented by the Persians: for they say that according to the number of days of which the entire journey consists, so many horses and men are set at intervals, each man and horse appointed for a day's journey. These neither snow nor rain nor heat nor darkness of night prevents from accomplishing each one the task proposed to him, with the very utmost speed. The first then rides and delivers the message with which he is charged to the second, and the second to the third; and after that it goes through them handed from one to the other, as in the torch-race among the Hellenes, which they perform for Hephaestus. This kind of running of their horses the Persians call Angarium.

A sentence of this description of the angarium, translated as "Neither snow nor rain nor heat nor gloom of night stays these couriers from the swift completion of their appointed rounds," is famously inscribed on the James A. Farley Building in New York City, former main United States Postal Service branch in New York City.

== See also ==
- Royal Road, an ancient highway system in the Achaemenid Empire
