= James A. Farley Building =

Historic post office in Manhattan, New York

- U.S. General Post Office
- U.S. National Register of Historic Places
- New York State Register of Historic Places
- New York City Landmark
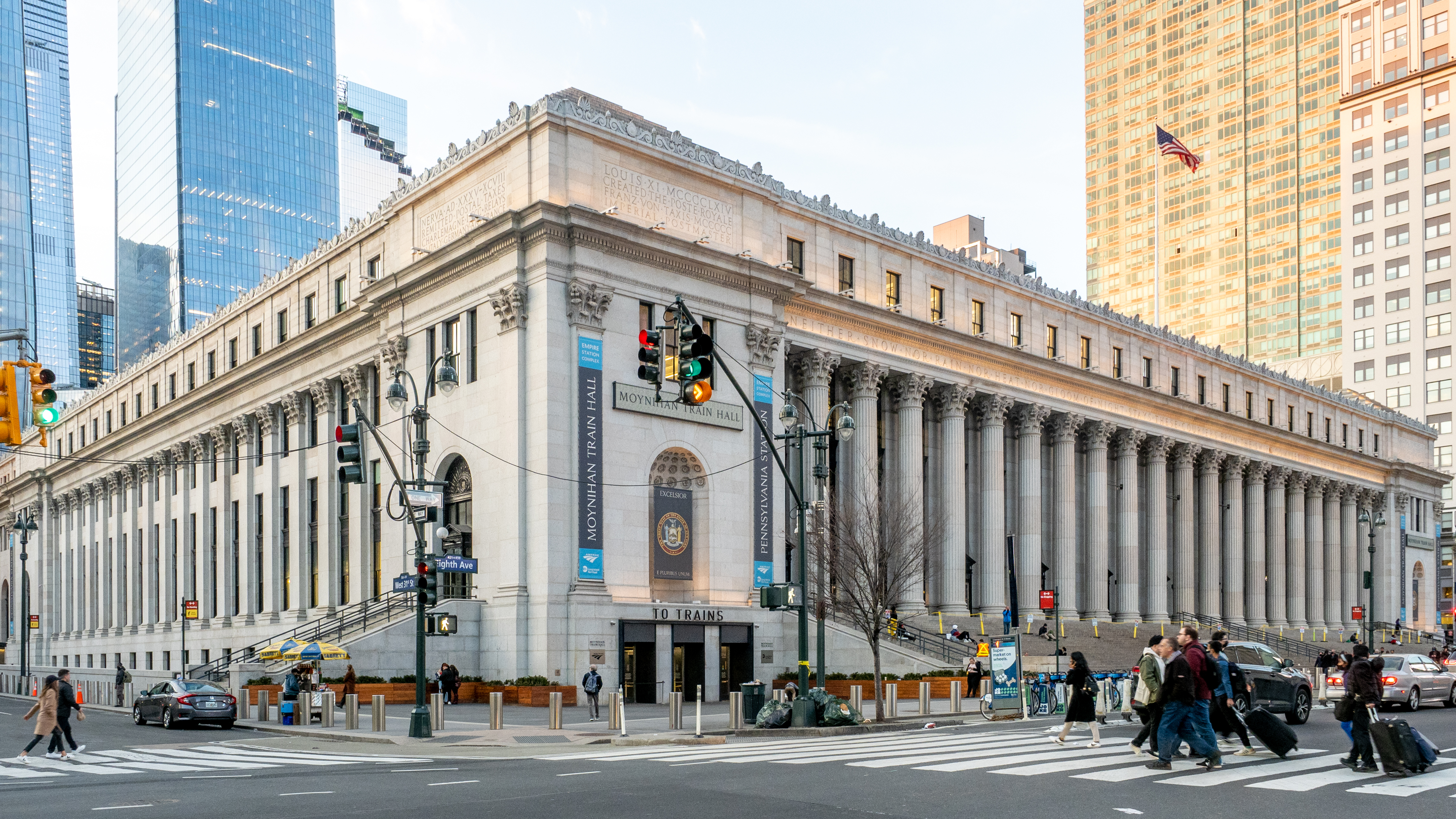
- Location: 421 Eighth Avenue between 31st and 33rd streets, New York, New York
- Coordinates: 40°45′04″N 73°59′43″W
- Area: 8 acres
- Built: 1911–1914
- Architect: McKim, Mead, and White
- Architectural style: Beaux-Arts
- NRHP reference No.: 73002257
- NYSRHP No.: 06101.000007
- NYCL No.: 0232

Significant dates
- Added to NRHP: January 29, 1973
- Designated NYSRHP: June 23, 1980
- Designated NYCL: May 17, 1966

The James A. Farley Building (formerly Pennsylvania Terminal and the U.S. General Post Office) is a mixed-use structure in Midtown Manhattan, New York City, which formerly served as the city's main United States Postal Service (USPS) branch. Designed by McKim, Mead & White in the Beaux-Arts style, the structure was built between 1911 and 1914, with an annex constructed between 1932 and 1935. The Farley Building, at 421 Eighth Avenue between 31st Street and 33rd Street in Midtown Manhattan, faces Pennsylvania Station and Madison Square Garden to the east.

The main facade of the Farley Building (over 8th Avenue) features a Corinthian colonnade finishing at a pavilion on each end. The imposing design was meant to match that of the original Pennsylvania Station across the street. An entablature above the colonnade bears the United States Postal Service creed: "Neither snow nor rain nor heat nor gloom of night stays these couriers from the swift completion of their appointed rounds." The colonnade's inner ceiling is decorated with the crests or emblems of ten major nations that existed at the building's completion. The remaining three facades have a similar but simpler design.

The James A. Farley Building was known as the Pennsylvania Terminal until 1918, when it was renamed the General Post Office Building. The building was made a New York City designated landmark in 1966 and was added to the National Register of Historic Places in 1973. It was officially renamed in 1982 in honor of James Farley who was the nation's 53rd postmaster general and served from 1933 to 1940. The building was sold to the New York government in 2006. The interior space that once housed the main mail sorting room now houses the Moynihan Train Hall since 2021. Office space in the building was leased to Meta in 2020.

== Site ==
The building fronts on the west side of Eighth Avenue, across from Pennsylvania Station and Madison Square Garden. It is at 421 Eighth Avenue in the New York City borough of Manhattan. The site is bounded by Eighth Avenue to the east, 31st Street to the south, Ninth Avenue to the west, and 33rd Street to the north. The Farley Building occupies two full city blocks, an 8-acre (32,000 m^{2}) footprint straddling the tracks of the Northeast Corridor and the Farley Corridor (sub-district B) in western Midtown Manhattan. The building occupies a land lot measuring 455 feet (139 m) along Eighth and Ninth Avenues, and 800 feet (240 m) along 31st and 33rd Streets. According to the New York City Department of City Planning, it has a lot area of 364,000 square feet (33,800 m^{2}) and a gross floor area of 1,378,125 square feet (128,032.0 m^{2}). Just to the south is the Lithuanian Alliance of America clubhouse.

== Architecture ==
The Farley Building consists of the old general post office building, completed in 1914, and its western annex, completed in 1935. The original building was designed by the firm of McKim, Mead & White, who also designed the adjacent original Pennsylvania Station in the same Beaux-Arts style. William Mitchell Kendall was the lead architect on the design. The firm also designed the annex.

=== Facade ===
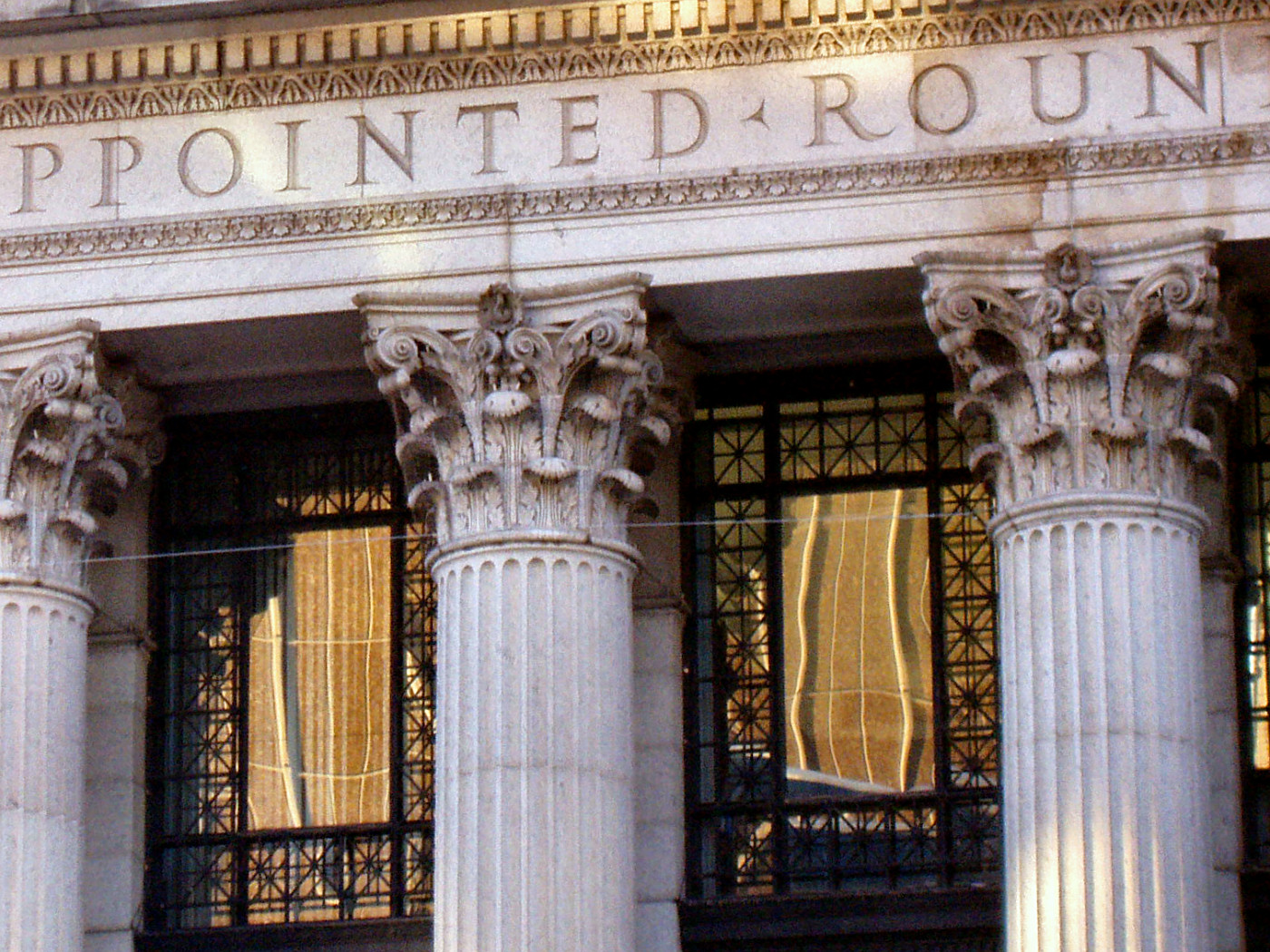
A carefully detailed Corinthian colonnade under the inspirational inscription

The four-story structure consists of granite ashlar cladding around a steel-frame superstructure. The monumental facade on Eighth Avenue was conceived as a Corinthian colonnade, composed of twenty 53-foot-tall (16 m) columns. The imposing design was meant to match the strength of the colonnade of McKim, Mead, and White's original Pennsylvania Station across Eighth Avenue, which originally faced the General Post Office Building. A flight of 31 steps, extending across the full length of the colonnade, provides access from the street to the main floor. The colonnade is braced at the end by two square pavilions, each capped with a low saucer dome, expressed on the exterior as a low stepped pyramid.

An entablature above the colonnade bears the inscription "Neither snow nor rain nor heat nor gloom of night stays these couriers from the swift completion of their appointed rounds". The sentence is taken from Herodotus' Histories (Book 8, Ch. 98) and describes the faithful service of the Persian system of mounted postal messengers under Xerxes I of Persia. It was selected by the United States Department of the Treasury in 1912. The inscription is frequently mistaken as the official motto of the United States Postal Service (USPS) and has become known as the United States Postal Service creed. At the tops of the end pavilions, names of various figures have been carved, such as Cardinal Richelieu, who were deemed important to the history of postal delivery in the Western world.

The facades along 31st and 33rd Streets contain colonnades with flat pilasters. These sides are divided into seven sections: a tripartite central pavilion with archways, flanked on either side by a row of pilasters and a square end pavilion. The Ninth Avenue side contains a similar row of flat pilasters. There are three arches at the center of the Ninth Avenue facade, which were used for truck deliveries. The roof is mostly flat, aside from the pyramidal roofs of the end pavilions. A sill runs above the third story. Until 1994, the fourth story was crowned by an ornate stone cornice. The roof of the building is about 101 feet (31 m) above the curb.

The main floor, 22 feet (6.7 m) above ground level, is surrounded by a dry moat, providing light and air to workspaces below. The moats ran along 31st and 33rd Streets and along the corners at Eighth Avenue; they originally featured glass skylights overlooking the tracks. The moats were replaced with concrete slabs by the late 20th century. The moats at the corners at Eighth Avenue were infilled. In 2017, the former moats became entrances to the West End Concourse of Moynihan Train Hall, underneath the Farley Building.

=== Interior ===
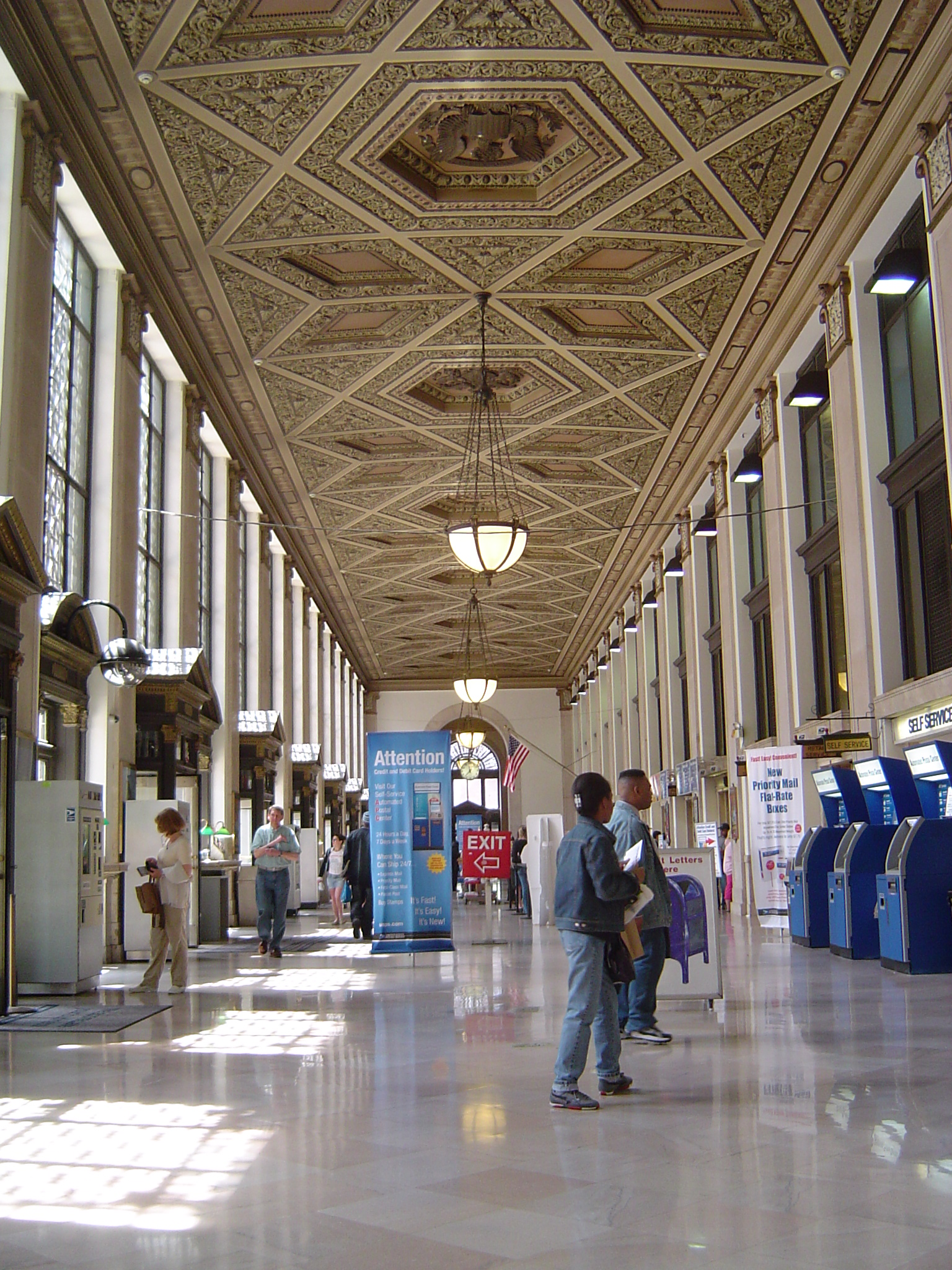
The front reception hall of the post office

Inside the Eighth Avenue entrance is a two-story-tall gallery that parallels the colonnaded front. The floors of the gallery were originally paved in various colors of marble, while the walls were made of buff marble and white plaster, with various windows along both sides. The painted plaster ceiling of the front reception hall is divided into sections of 28 feet (8.5 m) each. Each ceiling section is decorated with carved national emblems or coats of arms of ten members of the Postal Union at the time of the building's construction: the United States, the United Kingdom, the German Empire, the French Third Republic, the Russian Empire, the Kingdom of Italy, the Kingdom of Spain, Belgium, Austria-Hungary, and the Netherlands. The French Third Republic was represented by the cipher "R.F." for République Française at the time of the Farley Building's opening, as the republic lacked an official national emblem.

Elevators led from the Farley Building to most of Penn Station's platforms. By the end of the 20th century, only the elevator to track 12 was used to deliver mail. In addition, six siding tracks extend west from Penn Station underneath the Farley Building. At the time of the original Penn Station's completion in 1910, these tracks could fit 26 mail cars. There were three subsurface levels provided for mail transport within the building: a basement 18 feet (5.5 m) below street level, the tracks 50 feet (15 m) deep, and a trucking platform 72 feet (22 m) deep. These connected to the mailing level, which was just above street level. Chutes and conveyor belts connected the levels.

Inside the building is Moynihan Train Hall, designed by Skidmore, Owings & Merrill (SOM). It consists of 255,000 ft^{2} (23,700 m^{2}) of space underneath a 92 ft (28 m) tall glass skylight. The hall also contains 120,000 ft^{2} (11,000 m^{2}) of retail space. Moynihan Train Hall contains passenger facilities for Amtrak, its primary tenant. These include a ticketing and baggage area, a waiting lounge, conference spaces, and a balcony 20 ft (6.1 m) above the hall.

== History ==
=== Construction ===
A general post office in Midtown Manhattan had been planned from the late 1890s. As part of the planning of Penn Station in the first decade of the 20th century, the Pennsylvania Railroad (PRR) proposed that the United States Post Office Department construct a post office on 8th Avenue, across from the station. In February 1903, the U.S. government accepted the PRR's proposal and made plans to construct what would become the Farley Building. A deed was prepared and submitted in 1905 to George B. Cortelyou, the Postmaster General of the United States. The PRR would construct the tracks and supporting columns under the post office as part of the plan. The site faced opposition from several members of the United States Congress, who expressed concern that the U.S. government would only own "a chunk of space in the air", namely the air rights above the tracks. Concern also stemmed from the planned interior court measuring 100 by 150 feet (30 by 46 m), which could potentially become a ventilation flue. Nonetheless, the land for the post office was acquired by June 1906. The U.S. government took title to the site in January 1907, with an easement for the PRR allowing trains to use the tracks and platforms underneath.

The architect was selected under the Tarsney Act of 1893, which permitted the Supervisory Architect to hold an architectural design competition for U.S. government facilities. Several prominent firms and architects were invited to submit plans in early 1908. Supervisory architect James Knox Taylor selected McKim, Mead & White for the post office the same year. (Note: The other competing firms were Carrere & Hastings, Heins & LaFarge, George B. Post & Sons, H. Van Buren Magonigle, Whitfield & King, Kenneth M. Murchison and Cass Gilbert.) By then, steelwork for the tracks and platforms was already under construction. The initial appropriation for the post office building was $2.5 million, but in April 1910, Congress allocated another $1 million for construction. The construction of Pennsylvania Station across the street was progressing more quickly. The as-yet-incomplete Penn Station post office saw its first mail, delivered through the mail platform, when the station officially opened on November 27, 1910. A $2.5 million contract to build the Post Office was awarded to the George A. Fuller Company in March 1911. By December 1913, the post office was already processing second, third, and fourth class mail. The New York Times characterized the new post office as "not only the largest, but the finest in the world" of its kind.

=== Operation as post office ===
==== Opening and early years ====
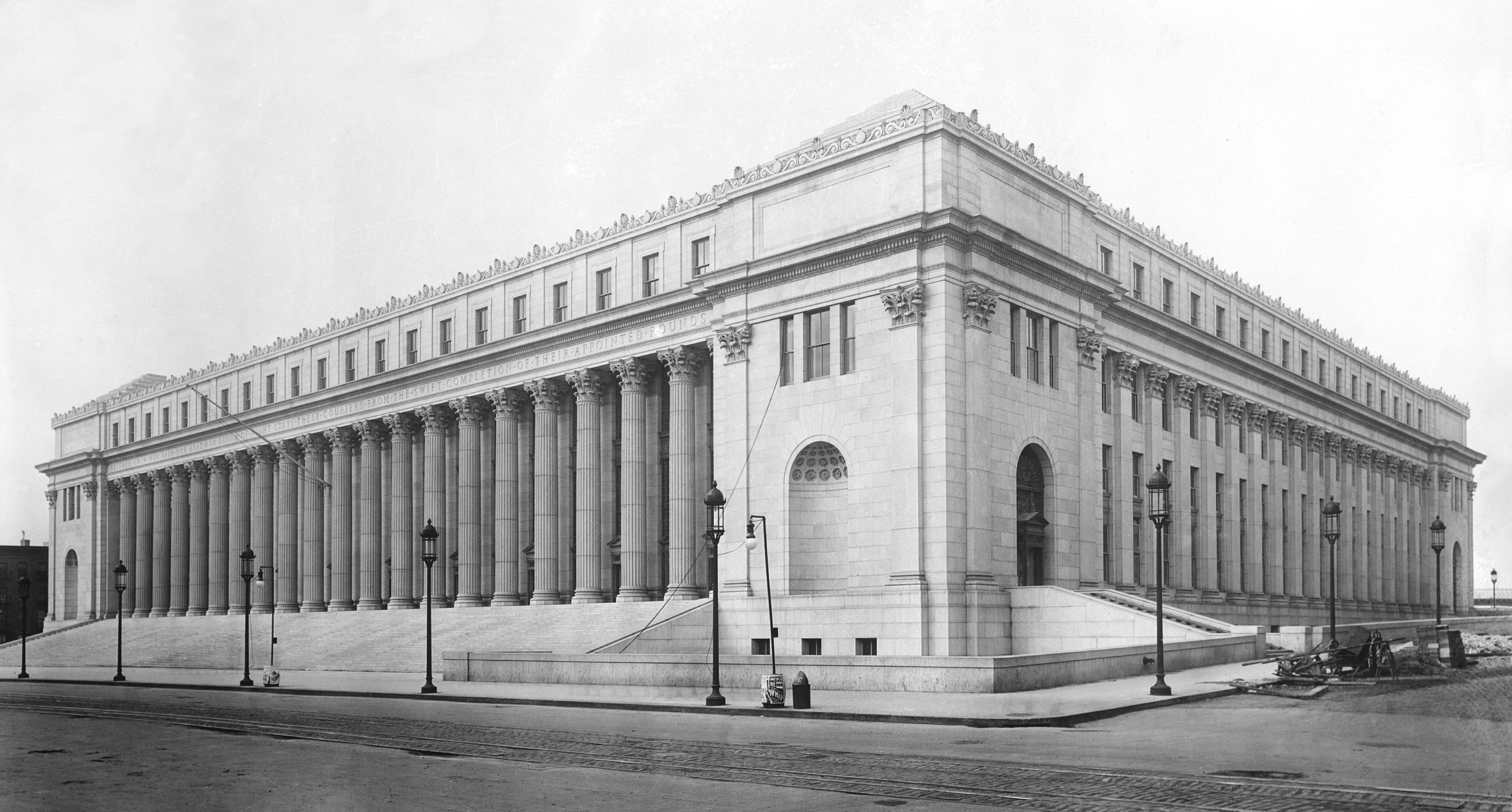
c. 1912

The original monumental structure officially opened on September 5, 1914. With this, the Long Island Rail Road's mail operations were moved from Long Island City to the Penn Station post office. As completed, the Penn Station post office measured 355 feet (108 m) along Eighth Avenue and 332 feet (101 m) along the side streets, with 400,000 square feet (37,000 m^{2}) of interior space. The Times described it as the second largest building in the city behind the original Penn Station and Grand Central Terminal, the post office incorporating some 165,000 cubic feet (4,700 m^{3}) of pink granite, 18,000 tons of steel, and 7 million bricks. The construction of the Penn Station post office spurred the opening of printing businesses in the vicinity.

The post office was known as the Pennsylvania Terminal when it opened; at the time, the city's general post office was still the City Hall Post Office in Lower Manhattan. Effective July 1, 1918, the Penn Station post office became New York City's general post office. By the early 1920s, the General Post Office had become congested, and a U.S. Congressional report in 1923 recommended that it be expanded westward. The U.S. government announced its intention, in 1927, to buy the plot immediately west of the existing post office building.

==== Expansion ====
The Post Office Department announced an expansion of the General Post Office in 1930. The western part of the block would contain an annex to the main facility, as well as a parcel post station called Morgan Station. McKim, Mead & White were rehired for the expansion. In April 1931, the Treasury Department bought the western half of the block from the Pennsylvania Railroad for $2.5 million. The building was expanded between 1932 and 1934 under then-Postmaster General James A. Farley. The work involved installing the largest girder in the city's history at the time, a 152-short-ton (136-long-ton; 138 t) girder that stretched 115 feet (35 m) across the railroad tracks. Foundation work was contracted to James Stewart & Co. and was nearly completed by early 1933.

The federal government awarded a $4.3 million construction contract to James Stewart & Co. in February 1934 after having unsuccessfully advertised for bids on three occasions over the previous years. During the construction of the annex, Farley's building supply firm, the General Builders Supply Corporation, had received a federal contract under the Hoover administration to provide building materials. Farley was accused by U.S. senator Huey Long of receiving preferential treatment from the Roosevelt administration, but the Senate cleared him of any wrongdoing, in what would be known as "The Long-Farley Affair of 1935". The annex opened in December 1935. In February 1938, the Treasury awarded a $696,000 contract to O'Driscoll and Grove Inc. for the renovation of the original portion of the structure. The work was to be performed in phases and completed within 300 days.

==== Late 20th century ====
During the 20th century, the General Post Office hosted Christmas tree-lighting events. The building was made a New York City designated landmark in 1966 and was listed on the National Register of Historic Places in 1973. In 1982, the Penn Station post office was dedicated as the James A. Farley Building, in honor of the former Postmaster General who had expanded the building in the 1930s. Known for being the supreme Democratic Party boss of New York State, Farley was responsible for Franklin D. Roosevelt's rise to the U.S. presidency.

In the early 1990s, U.S. senator Daniel Patrick Moynihan began to champion a plan to rebuild a replica of the historic Penn Station, in which he had shined shoes during the Great Depression. At the time, existing facilities at Penn Station were overcrowded and the USPS was planning to move much of its operations to another facility. In 1994, the cornice was removed; it was so deteriorated that chunks of stone had started falling onto the street. Parts of the deteriorated steel structure were also replaced.

==== Early 21st century ====
The Farley Building was instrumental to maintaining service levels in the New York metropolitan area following the September 11 attacks in 2001, when it served as a backup to operations for the Church Street Station Post Office opposite the World Trade Center complex. By October 2002, the New York state government had arranged to buy the Farley Building from the USPS for $230 million, with the USPS vacating much of the building. The Farley Post Office building was sold to the New York state government in 2006 in the hope that Moynihan's vision would be realized. Before the Great Recession in 2009, the Farley Post Office was the only New York City post office that was open 24/7, but as a result of the recession, its windows started closing at 10:00 p.m.

During the 2010s, the event venue operator Skylight Group used the Farley Building as an event venue. The Moynihan Station Development Corporation awarded a contract to Skylight in September 2012, allowing the latter group to use the building's sorting room and loading area for events. Events staged at the building included fashion shows such as New York Fashion Week, in addition to movie premieres, parties, and product launches.

=== Reuse ===
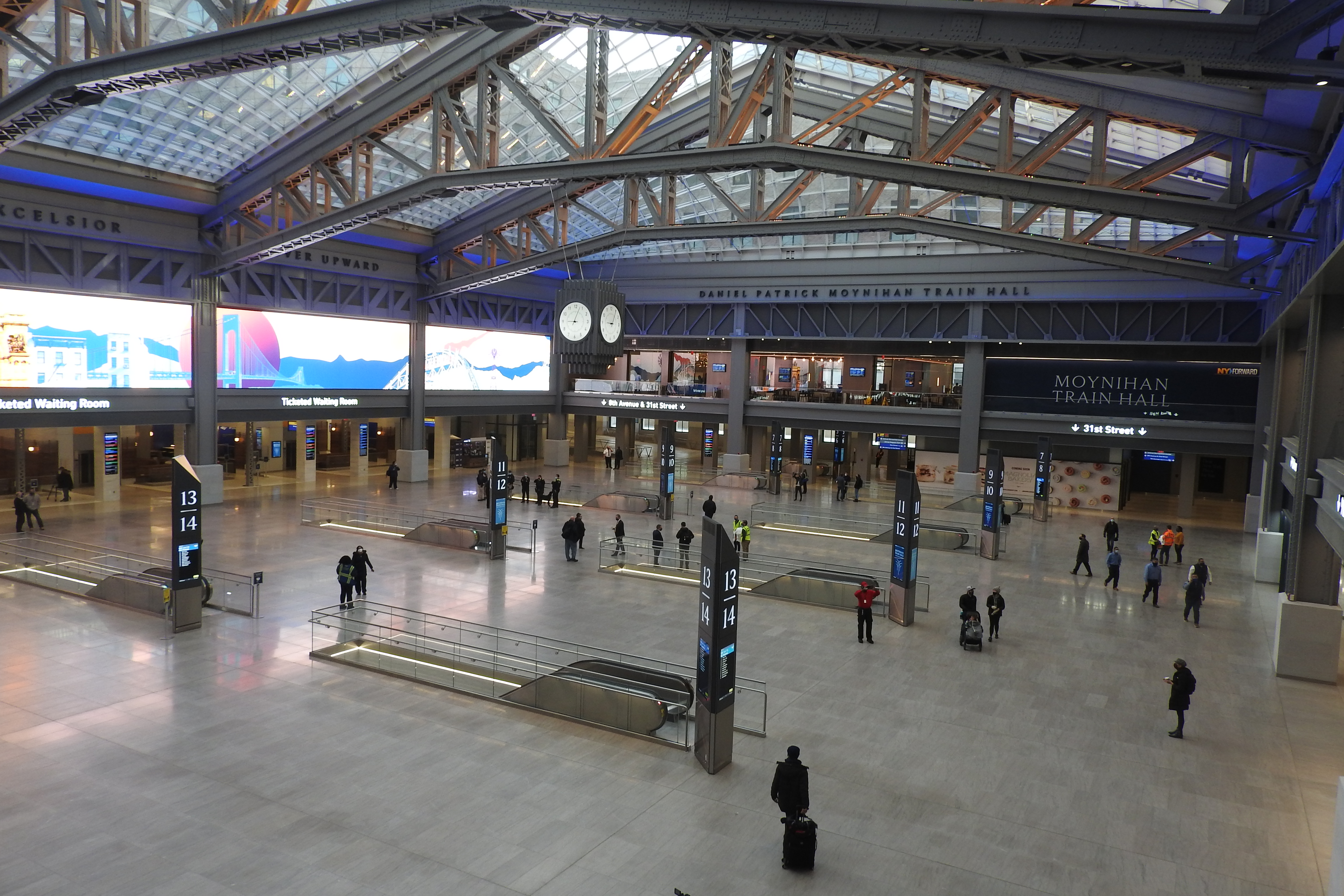
Moynihan Train Hall in 2021

Portions of the James Farley Post Office were adaptively reused and converted to a new head house for Penn Station, called Moynihan Train Hall, which houses Amtrak and the Long Island Rail Road. The first phase, consisting of new exits, a connection to the New York City Subway at 34th Street and Eighth Avenue, and an expanded concourse within the James Farley Post Office, started on October 18, 2010. The first phase opened in June 2017. Construction of the second phase, comprising a new train hall within the Farley Building, started two months afterward. It opened on January 1, 2021.

As part of the Moynihan redevelopment, The Related Companies and Vornado Realty Trust were selected to develop the building's retail space. The companies signed a contract in June 2017. Vornado and Related leased the building for 99 years, and in exchange, contributed $630 million to the hall's construction. In early 2018, Vornado and Related started considering plans to convert the Farley Building's remaining space that was not being used by the train hall. The developers contemplated marketing the building for use by a biotechnology or pharmaceutical company. In August 2020, Meta Platforms signed a lease for all 730,000 square feet (68,000 m^{2}) of the office space in the Farley Building, following a similar acquisition the company had made at nearby Hudson Yards the previous year. The lease came during the COVID-19 pandemic in New York City, when most Manhattan office workers were remote workers, and was seen at the time as a major positive for Manhattan's office market.

== See also ==
- List of New York City Designated Landmarks in Manhattan from 14th to 59th Streets
- National Register of Historic Places listings in Manhattan from 14th to 59th Streets
