= Maidan (Kolkata) =

Urban green space in Kolkata, India

The Maidan
- Lungs of Kolkata
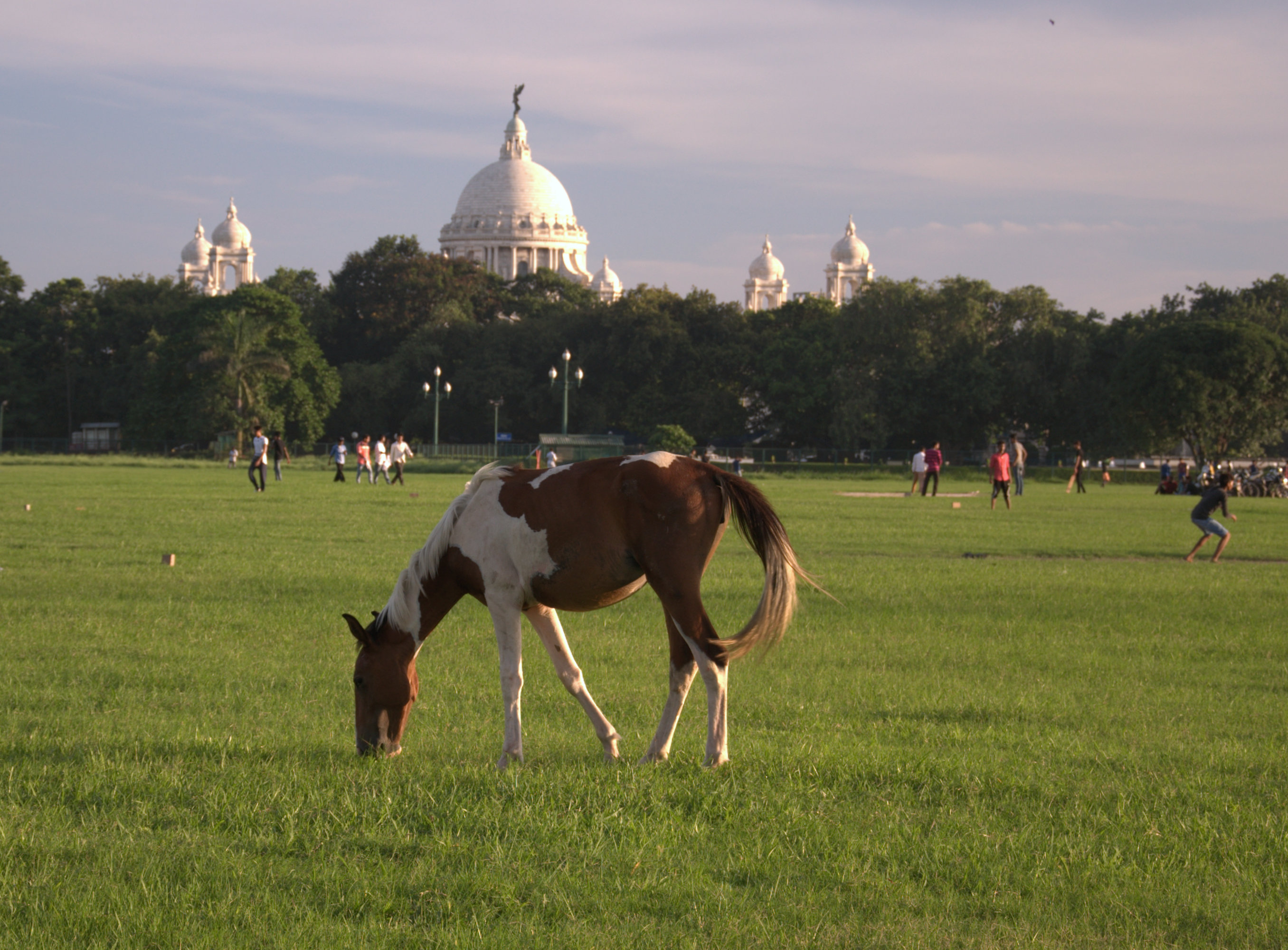
- Kolkata skyline across the Maidan overlooking Victoria Memorial
- Interactive map of The Maidan
- Location: Kolkata, West Bengal, India
- Area: 519 hectares (1,280 acres) (total); 160 hectares (400 acres) (public urban green space)
- Owner: Ministry of Defence, Government of India
- Public transit: Kolkata Metro Blue Line: Maidan; Park Street; Esplanade; Kolkata Metro Purple Line: Victoria; Park Street; Esplanade
- Venues: Urban green space (commonly known as "Garher math"); Fort William; Eden Gardens; Kolkata Race Course; Private urban parks and playgrounds

The Maidan (lit. 'open field'; Bengali: ময়দান; Hindi: मैदान) is a large urban area containing vast urban green space, parks, playgrounds and several public venues in the center of Kolkata (Calcutta), India. The area is spread over a total area of 519 hectares (1,280 acres). The urban green space of the Maidan, which comprises an area of around 160 hectares (400 acres), is the largest urban park and urban green space in Kolkata city and second largest in the Kolkata metropolitan area as well as in India. Prior to the 2013 creation of Eco Park, it was the largest urban park in India. Its vast stretch of field that includes numerous sporting grounds, including the famous cricketing venue Eden Gardens, several football stadiums and the Kolkata Race Course.

== History ==
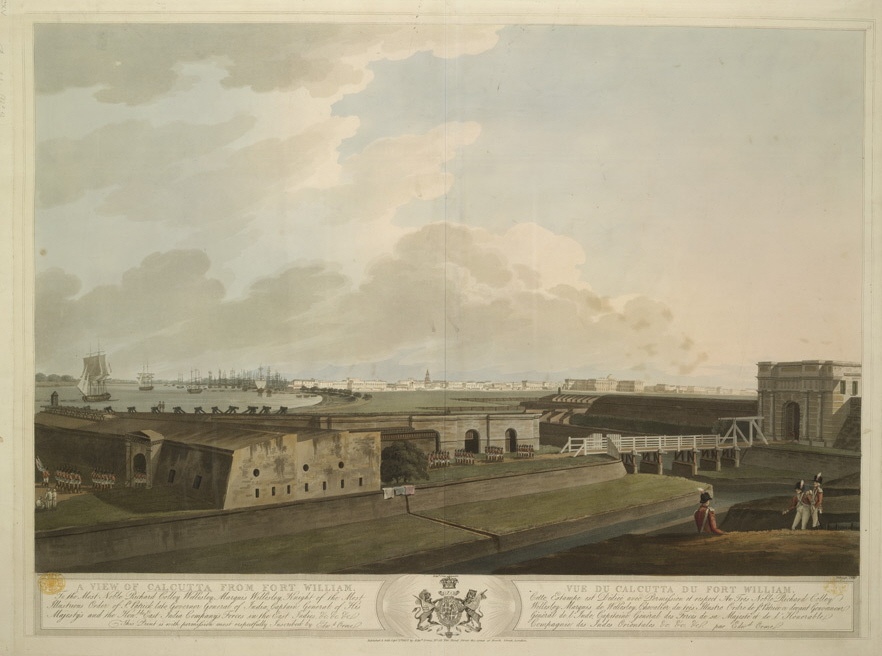
A view of Calcutta from Fort William (c. 1807)

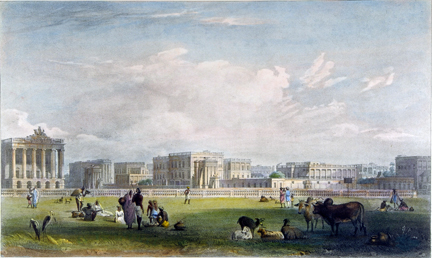
A view of the mansions, including Government House, that lined the north side of the Maidan

In 1758, one year after their decisive win in Battle of Plassey, the British East India Company commenced construction of the new Fort William in the center of the village Gobindapur. The inhabitants of the village were compensated and provided with land in Taltala, Kumartuli and Shovabazar. The fort was completed in 1773.

The tiger-haunted jungle which cut off the village of Chowringhee from the river was cleared, and gave way to the wide grassy stretch of the Maidan of which Calcutta is so proud. The formation of this airy expanse and the filling up of the creek which had cut off the settlement in the south, led the European inhabitants to gradually forsake the narrow limits of the old palisades. The movement towards Chowringhee had already been noticeable as early as 1746.

The Maidan was initially developed as a 5 square kilometre parade ground for the forces. While the Europeans moved to the area around the Maidan, the Indians moved away from the area. The richer families such as the Debs moved to Sobhabazar, the Tagores to Pathuriaghata and Jorasanko, and the Ghosals to Bhukailash (Khidirpur). Although the army has owned the Maidan since it was developed, administering it was one on the long list of duties of the police. Thieves, both Indian and European, were there as early as the 1860s. Legally also, the fort and the Maidan were excluded from the city as per Act 16 of 1847.

Ground of the Calcutta Cricket Club, 15th Jan'y. 1861 H.M. 68th L.I. from Rangoon, versus the Calcutta Cricket Club, a lithograph after a watercolour by Percy Carpenter, depicting Calcutta Cricket Club, with the Maidan in the background.

In 1883–1884 the Maidan, along with grounds of the Indian Museum, hosted the Calcutta International Exhibition.

In 1909, H.E.A. Cotton wrote,

The great Maidan presents a most refreshing appearance to the eye, the heavy night dew, even in the hot season, keeping the grass green. Many of the fine trees with which it was once studded were blown down in the cyclone of 1864. But they have not been allowed to remain without successors, and the handsome avenues across the Maidan still constitute the chief glory of Calcutta. Dotting the wide expanse are a number of fine tanks, from which the inhabitants were content in former days to obtain their water-supply.

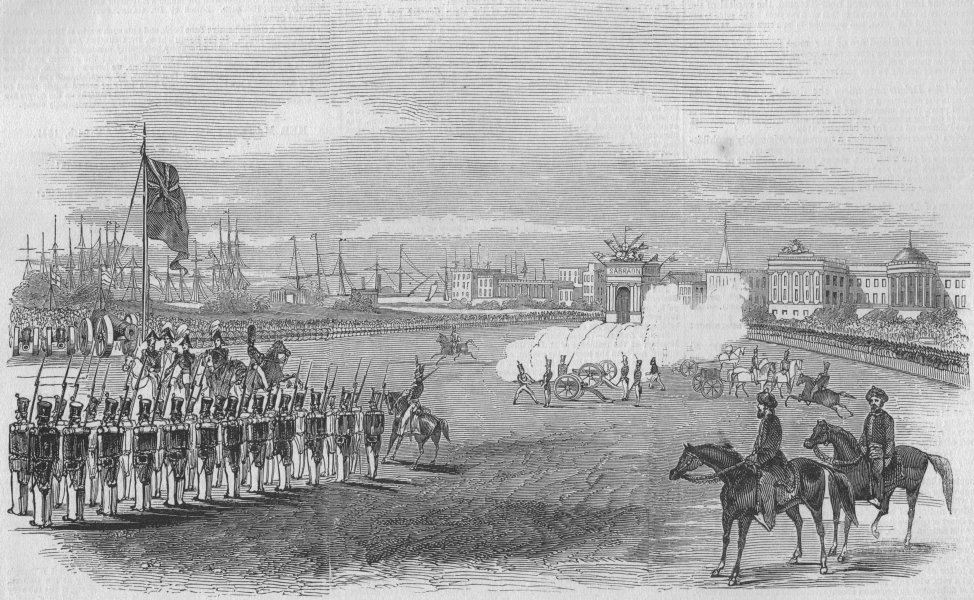
Grand field day on the ground, 1847

== Cityscapes of Maidan ==
The park is considered the historical and cultural center of Kolkata, as well as one of the city's most popular tourist attractions and a hub of leisure and entertainment for Calcuttans. The Maidan stretches from the Raj Bhavan building on the Esplanade in the north to the National Library on Belvedere Road in Alipore in the south. The wide field stretches from the Hooghly River in the west to the Victoria Memorial in the east. Maidan police station is part of the South division of Kolkata Police.

=== Urban green space ===
Due to the freshness and greenery it provides to the metropolis, it has been referred to as the "lungs of Kolkata". In Bengali, the maidan is called 'Garh-er maath'. 'Garh', in Bengali, means fort and its meaning literally translates to the 'fort's ground'.

=== Fort William and Army wing ===
The Maidan hosts the Indian Army's Eastern Command in its historic Fort William. On Council House Street, at one corner of the Maidan, was the now long-defunct Fort William College, which played a pioneering role in the development of many of the Indian languages, particularly Bengali.

=== Raj Bhaban and the monuments ===
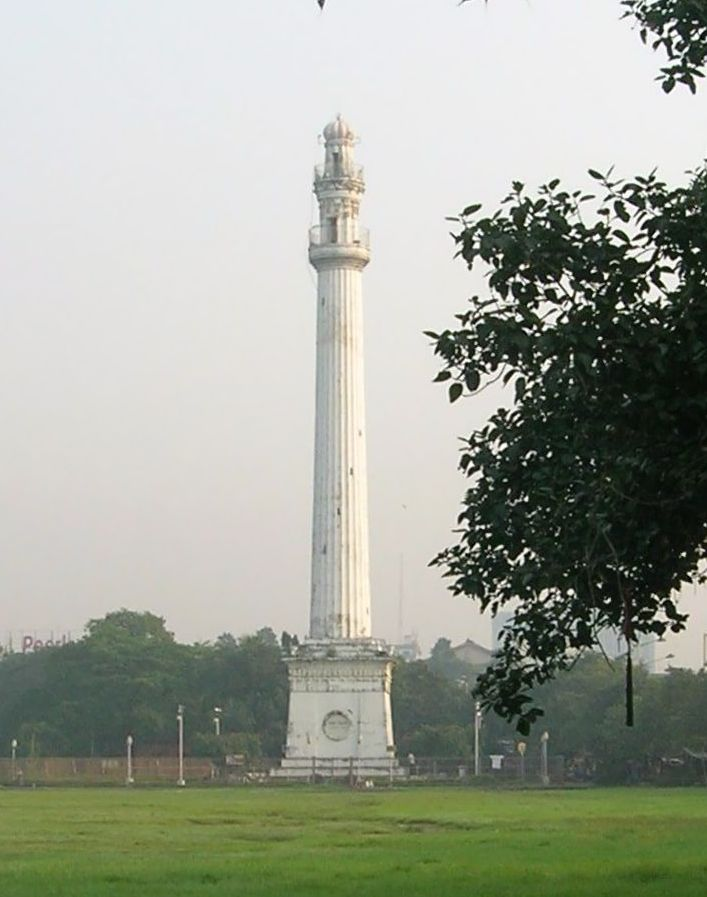
Octerlony Monument (renamed Shaheed Minar)

Government House was built in 1803, the 48-metre (157 ft) high Octerlony Monument in 1828, the museum was started in the Asiatic Society in 1814 but shifted to the present site as the Indian Museum in 1887, St. Paul's Cathedral was built between 1839 and 1847, it was consecrated in 1874, and the Victoria Memorial was erected in 1921. The Maidan is also dotted with many statues and architectural works of British governor generals and other eminent personalities of the British Raj, including Lord Curzon, Kitchener, Roberts, Minto, Northbrook, Canning and others who had known Kolkata well. Two or three of them were erected in the first few years of Indian independence in 1947; it was not until 1983 that the last 16 were removed.

Over time, statues of Indians, including Mahatma Gandhi, Ram Mohan Roy, Chittaranjan Das, Jawaharlal Nehru, Subhas Chandra Bose, Sri Aurobindo, Matangini Hazra, Pritilata Waddedar, Indira Gandhi, and Gostho Pal, were erected to occupy the vacant plinths or plots. At the north-east corner of the Esplanade stands a statue of Lenin, set up to celebrate the centenary of his birth.

=== Playgrounds and stadiums ===
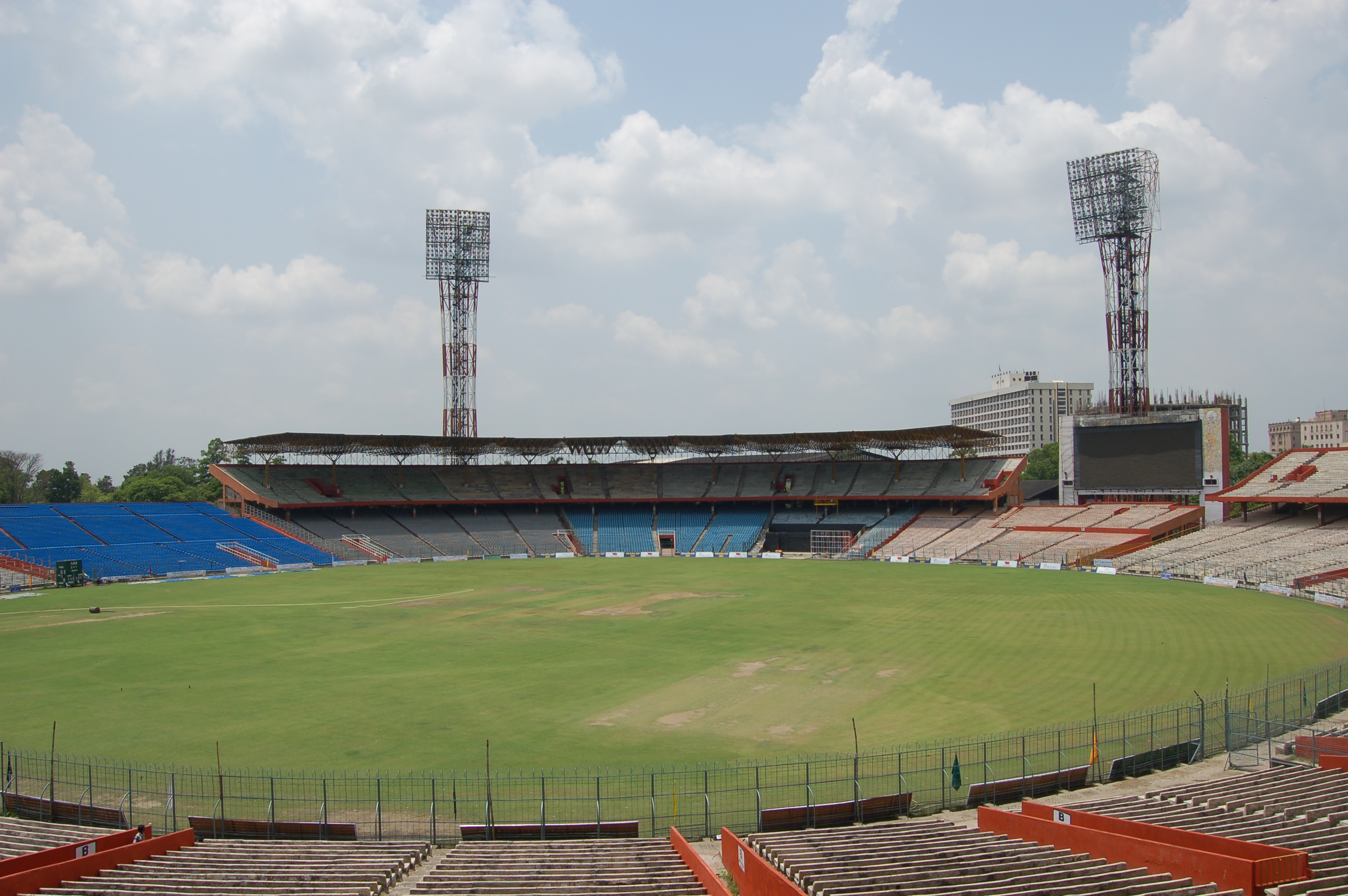
Eden Gardens, the second largest cricket stadium in the world, is in the heart of the Maidan

The cricket stadium at Eden Gardens was built in stages. Netaji Indoor Stadium was later added.

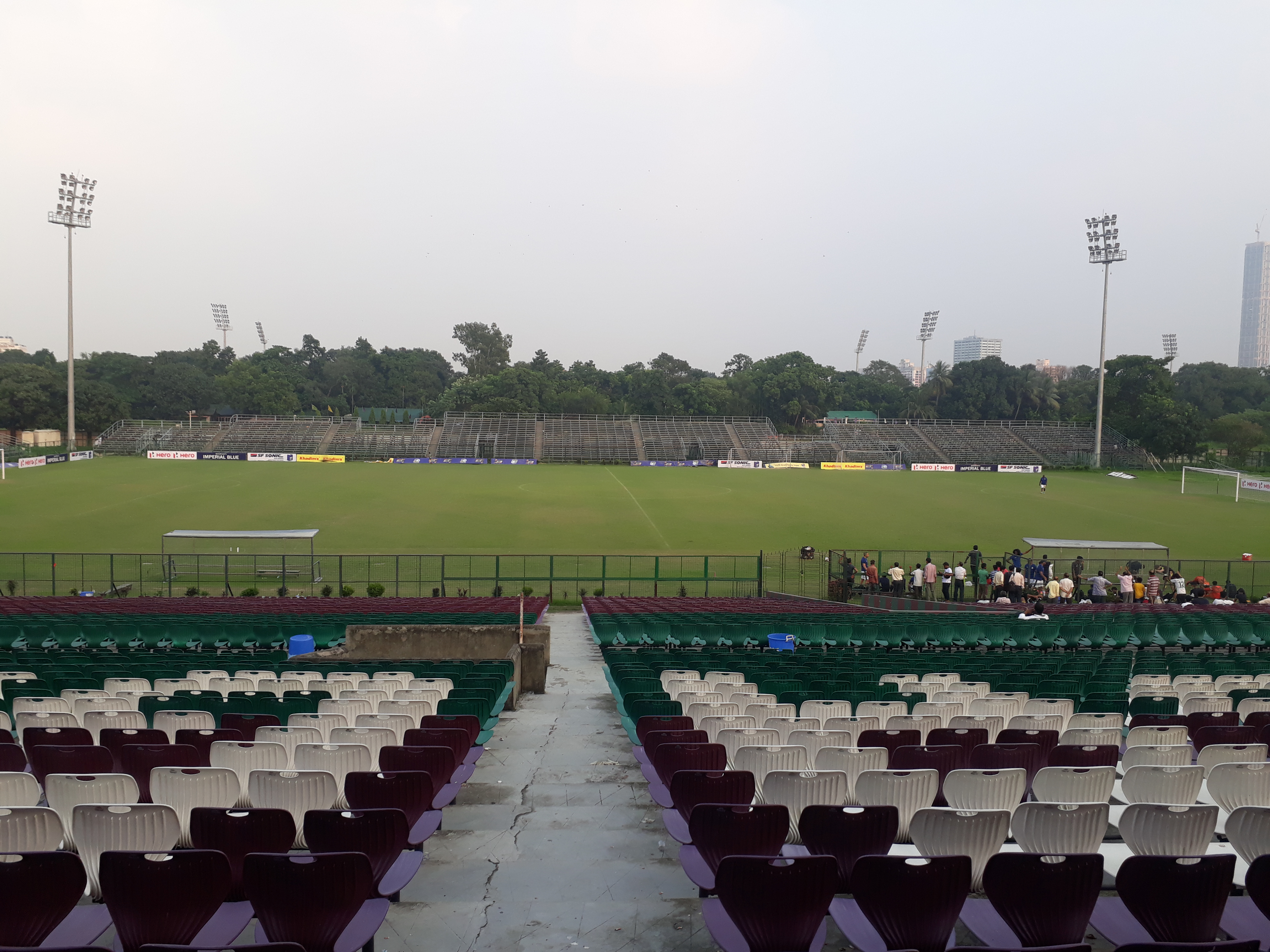
Mohun Bagan Ground at Maidan

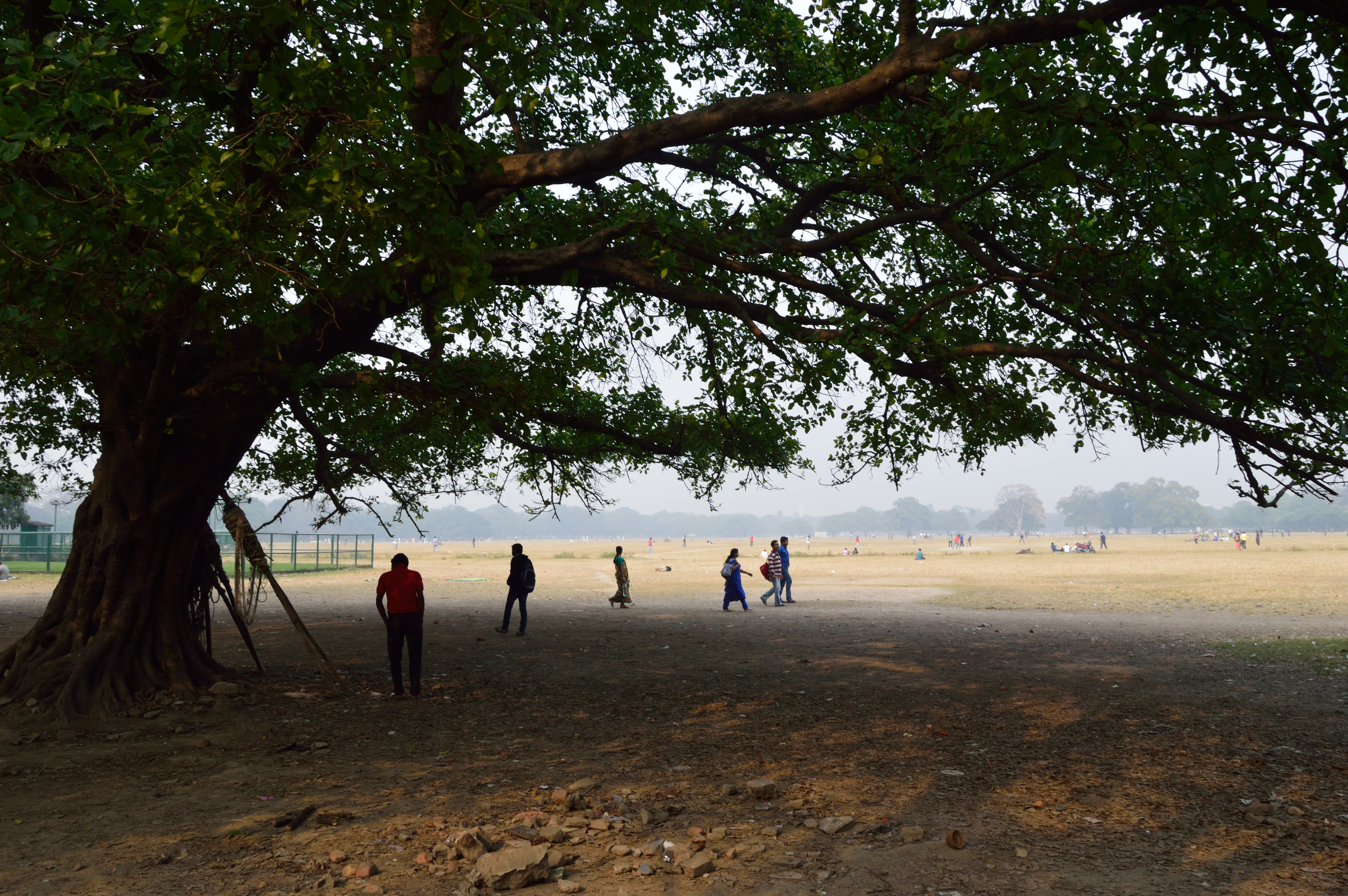
Life on Maidan

The second oldest cricket club named Calcutta Cricket Club was founded in Maidan in 1792, where football and rugby are currently practiced. The world's oldest hockey tournament, Beighton Cup, was instituted in 1895 and is usually held on the Mohun Bagan ground in the Maidan. For the Indian Football Association, the Maidan has been the nerve centre.

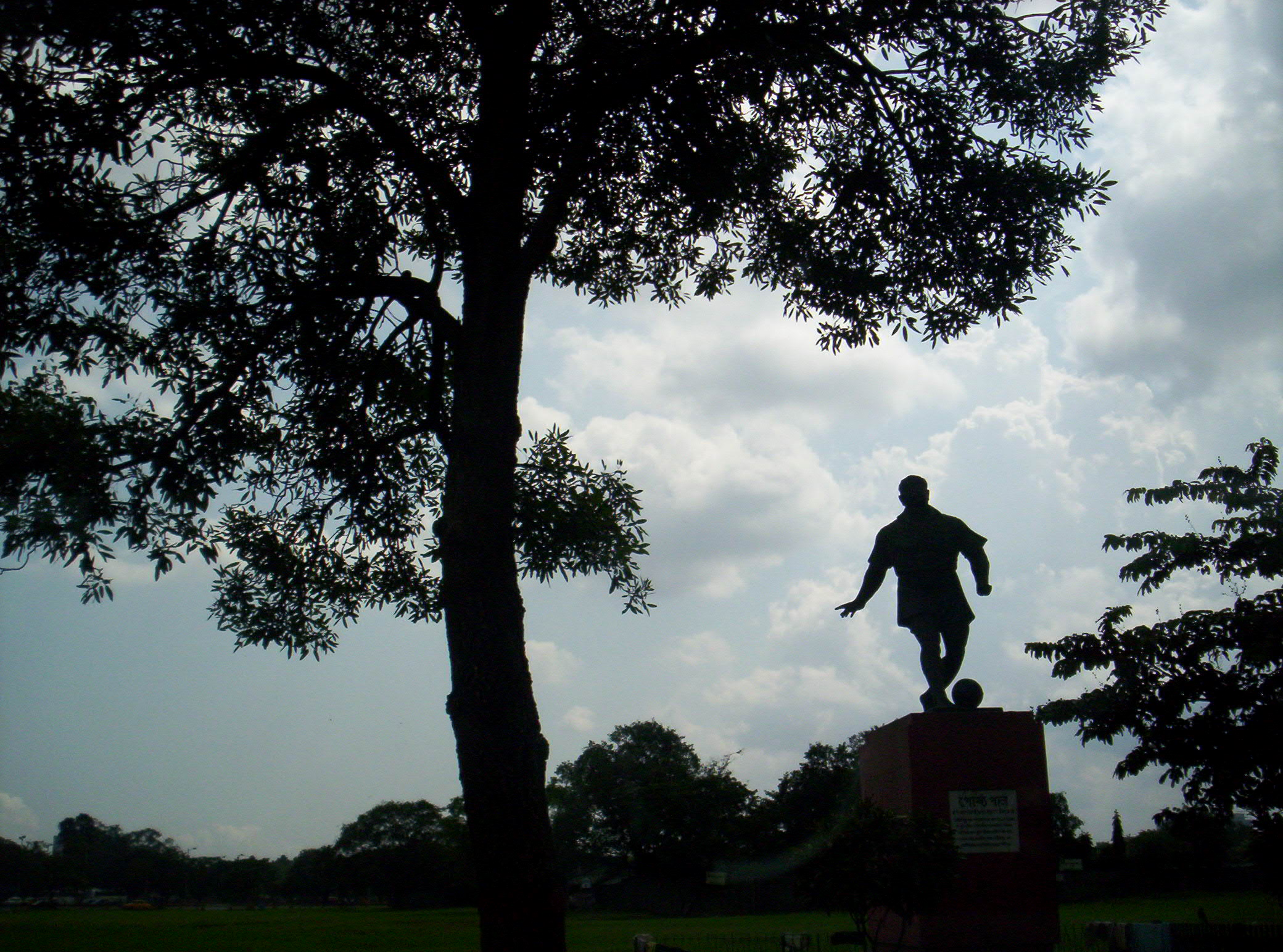
Statue of legendary Indian footballer Gostho Pal at Maidan

=== Around the maidan ===
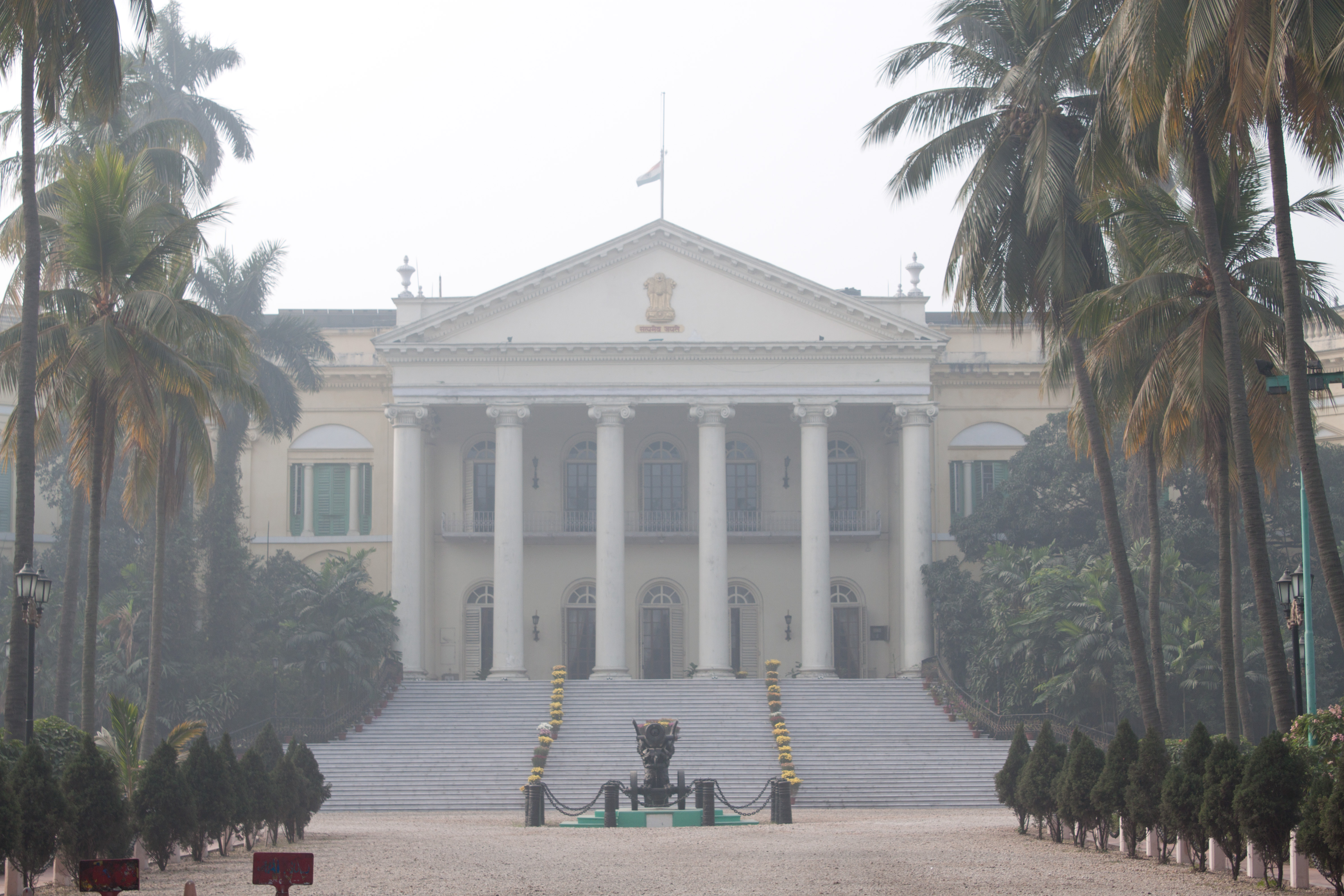
The Raj Bhavan in the northern part of the Maidan

The notable venues around the maidan are Rabindra Sadan, the Academy of Fine Arts and Nandan.

The oldest road on the Maidan is the Course, extending from the 'Cocked hat' in the north to the Khidirpur bridge. The 'broad gravelled walk' on the west side of that portion is the Red Road, constructed in 1820. To the south of the fort is the Ellenborough Course, meant for horse exercises, and towards the east is the Race Course, started in 1819. That was the scenario a century back.

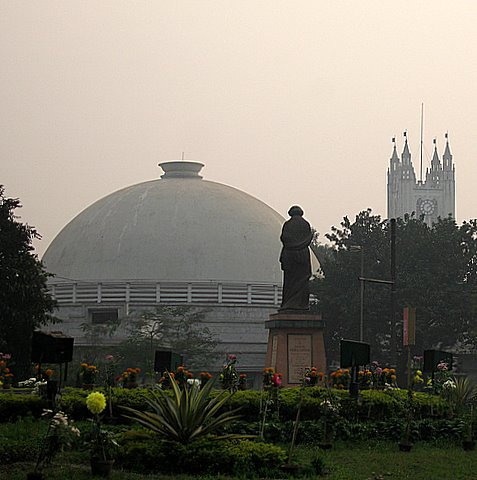
The Birla Planetarium in Kolkata with a statue of Indira Gandhi in the foreground and St. Paul's Cathedral in the background

== Public transport ==
The metro stations bordering the Maidan as one travels from the south are Victoria (under construction), Rabindra Sadan, Maidan, Park Street and Esplanade.

The Howrah Bridge is away from the Maidan, but the Vidyasagar Setu (Second Hooghly Bridge) overlooks at least one corner of the Maidan and Fort William.

== Events ==
=== Political rallies ===
The Maidan has been the venue for major political meetings and rallies of all political parties. Geoffrey Moorhouse in 1978 presents a vivid description of a Communist Party of India (Marxist) (CPI(M)) rally on the Maidan: "They generally start about tea time, they rarely finish before nine o’clock… they are masterly exhibitions of organisation… The platform is high so that everyone on it will be visible at a great distance, and it is large enough to accommodate twenty or thirty… it is illuminated with spotlights, it flutters with red flags, and it has huge red backcloth upon which Lenin is straining resolutely forward from a thicket of banners. Everything is perfectly under control… as they sit there upon the ground, row after attentive row of them, a brigade of young women to the fore… distantly across the Maidan people have climbed trees and others are packed standing on top of the Esplanade tram shelters… there must be a hundred thousand here altogether… the leaders come through the guard of honour to the platform…it is only when Promode Dasgupta and Hare Krishna Konar are having their say… theirs is the oratory that sends men delirious with dreams, that can set a rabble to a march of destruction… when the speeches are done, the leaders begin to sing the Internationale… all over the crowd torches are swiftly lit and held high in flaring salute…"
