= Dhanadhanya Auditorium =

Auditorium complex in Kolkata, India

Dhano Dhanya Auditorium
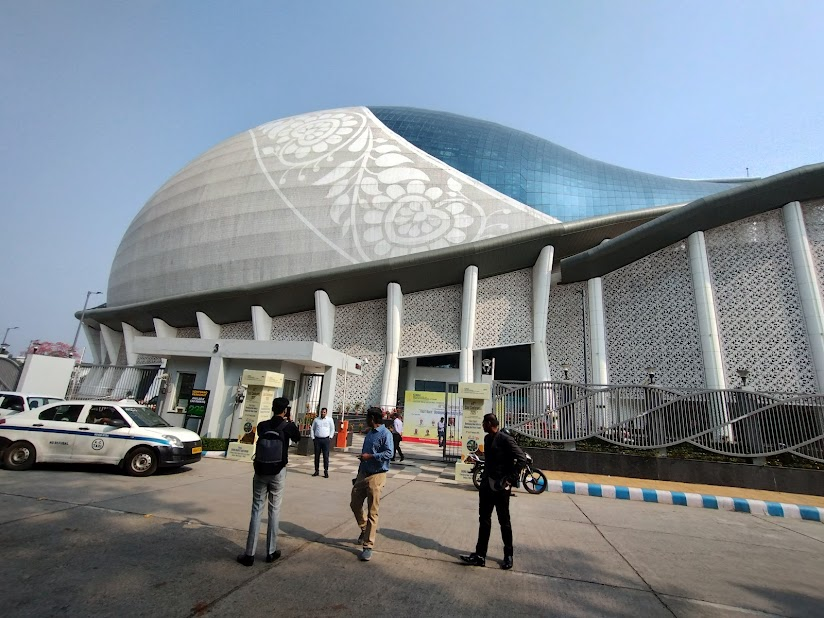
- Dhanadhanya Auditorium, Kolkata
- Interactive map of Dhano Dhanya Auditorium
- Location: Alipore, Kolkata, India
- Owner: Government of West Bengal
- Capacity: 2600
- Acreage: 4.5 Acres
- Public transit: Jatin Das Park metro station (Blue line); Khidirpur metro station (Purple line)

Construction
- Opened: 23 April 2023
- Cost: ₹450 crores
- Builder: NBCC

Dhano Dhanyo Auditorium is a premier state of the art multi-auditorium complex in Alipore, Kolkata, West Bengal, India. The auditorium was named "Dhanadhanya" in honour of the renowned poet, playwright and lyricist Dwijendralal Ray.

== Formation ==
The auditorium was planned in December 2017. February 2019 was the deadline for the project but due to COVID-19 the works halted and restarted in 2021. About 600 workers worked in the construction. In 2022, the work completed and on 13 April 2023, it was inaugurated by chief minister of West Bengal.

== Structure ==
The auditorium is designed in a form of conch shell. It has a main auditorium of 2000 seats with a mini-auditorium of 540 seats and an open stage with 300 seats. The building has 6 floors containing guest house, restaurant, cafeteria, VIP lounge, media lounge and a convention centre. The revolving stage has two concentric circles.

The complex also uses LV/AV systems, Solar systems, Building Management System etc.

The complex has basement parking with 2 levels of car parking with proper ventilation which also helps to free traffic congestion in Alipore area.

== Gallery ==
Views Of Dhanadhanya Auditorium
Event in Dhanadhanya Auditorium

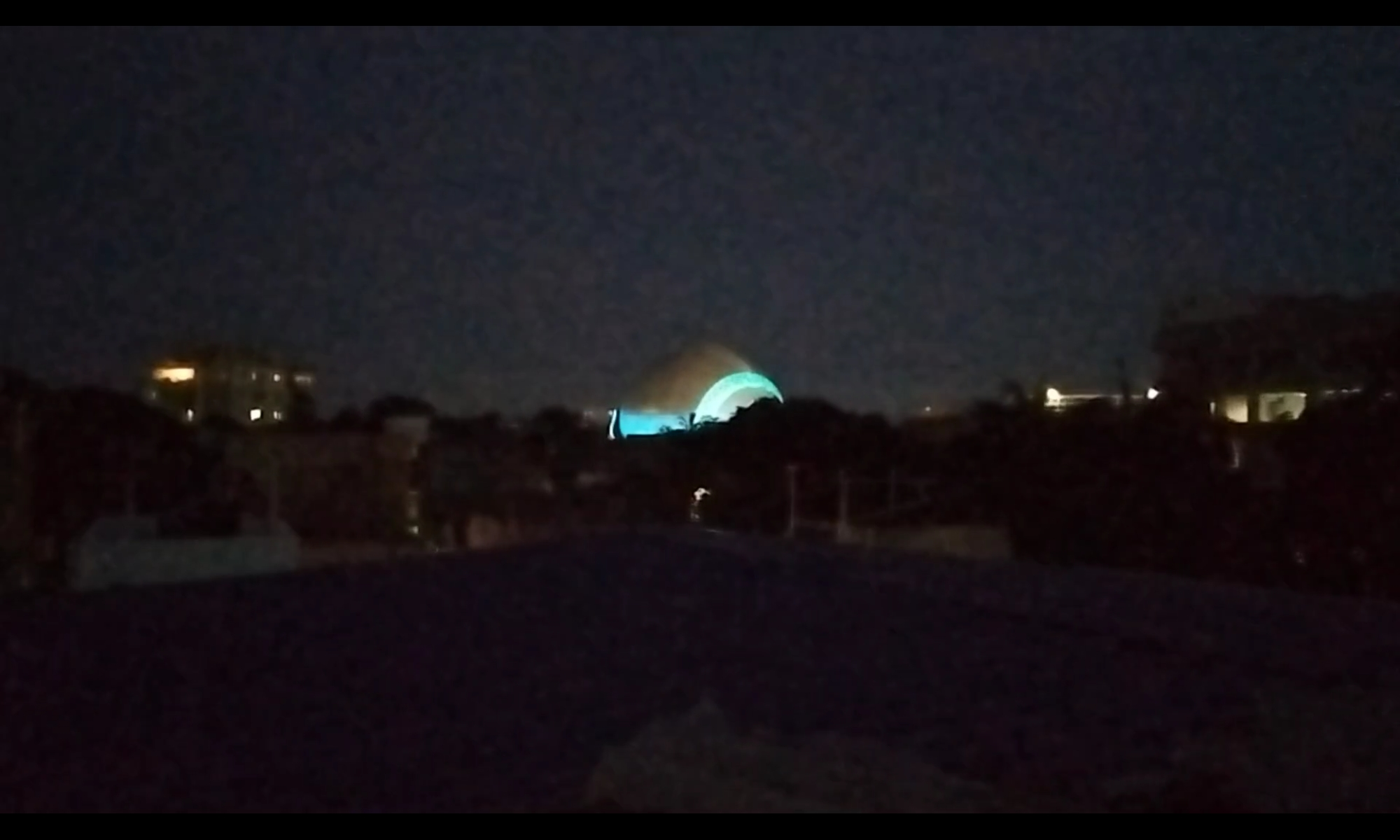
Main Hall of Dhanadhanya Auditorium

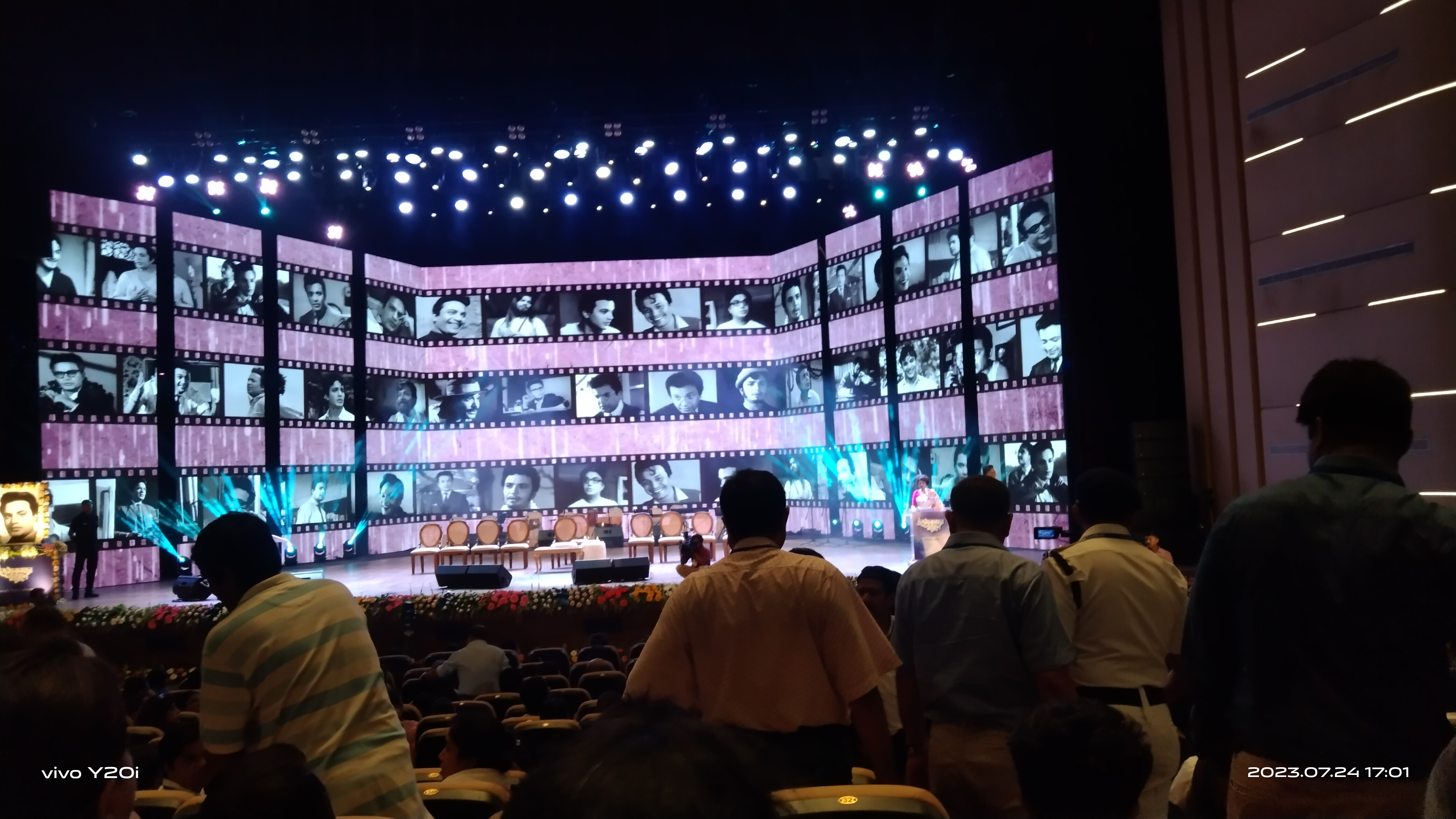
Dhanadhanya Auditorium in night
