= Maidan metro station =

Metro station in Kolkata, India

Maidan
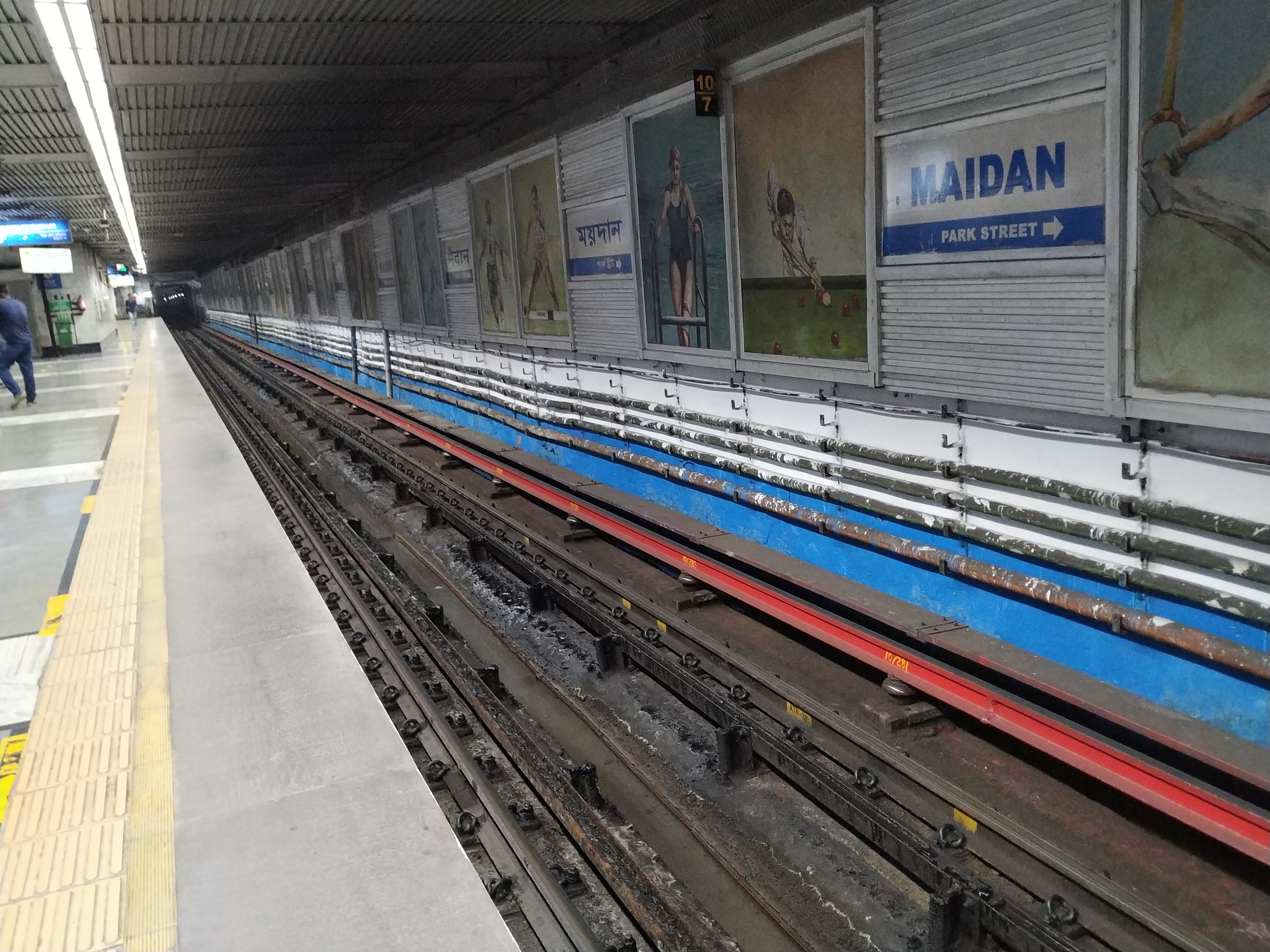
- Maidan metro station

General information
- Location: Middleton St, Chowringhee Road; Kolkata, West Bengal 700071; India
- Coordinates: 22.54936°N 88.34906°E
- System: Kolkata Metro
- Operator: Metro Railway, Kolkata
- Line: Blue Line
- Platforms: 2 (1 island platform)

Construction
- Structure type: Underground
- Accessible: No

Other information
- Station code: KMDI

History
- Opened: 24 October 1984; 41 years ago

Services
Preceding station	Kolkata Metro	Following station
Park Street towards Dakshineswar	Blue Line	Rabindra Sadan towards Shahid Khudiram
Route map
Location

Maidan is an underground metro station on the North-South corridor of the Blue Line of Kolkata Metro in Kolkata, West Bengal, India. It is located on Chowringhee Road at Middleton Street. It is named after Maidan, the largest urban park in Kolkata.

== History ==
In 2024, Kolkata Metro began replacing the steel third rail on the Blue Line with a highly conductive aluminum rail. This upgrade, the first in 38 years, aims to cut energy loss by 84%, saving approximately ₹1 crore per kilometer annually. The initial shipment from Germany covers about 5 kilometers, with a total of 35 kilometers planned over two years. The aluminum rail will reduce voltage drops, leading to faster travel times, more frequent services, and lower operational costs, while also cutting carbon emissions by 50,000 tons over its lifetime.

== Station layout ==
G	Street level	Exit/Entrance
L1	Mezannine	Fare control, station agent, Ticket/token, shops, crossover
L2	Platform 2	Towards Shahid Khudiram (Rabindra Sadan) →
L2	Island platform, Doors will open on the right
L2	Platform 1	← Towards Dakshineswar (Park Street)

== Entry/Exit ==
- 1 - Victoria Memorial, Brigade Parade Ground
- 2 - Jeevan Deep, Middleton St
- 3 - Kanak Building, Chowringhee Rd

== See also ==
- Kolkata
- List of Kolkata Metro stations
- Transport in Kolkata
- Kolkata Metro Rail Corporation
- Kolkata Suburban Railway
- Kolkata Monorail
- Trams in Kolkata
- Bhowanipore
- Chowringhee Road
- List of rapid transit systems
- List of metro systems
