= Khidirpur metro station =

Kolkata metro station

Khidirpur
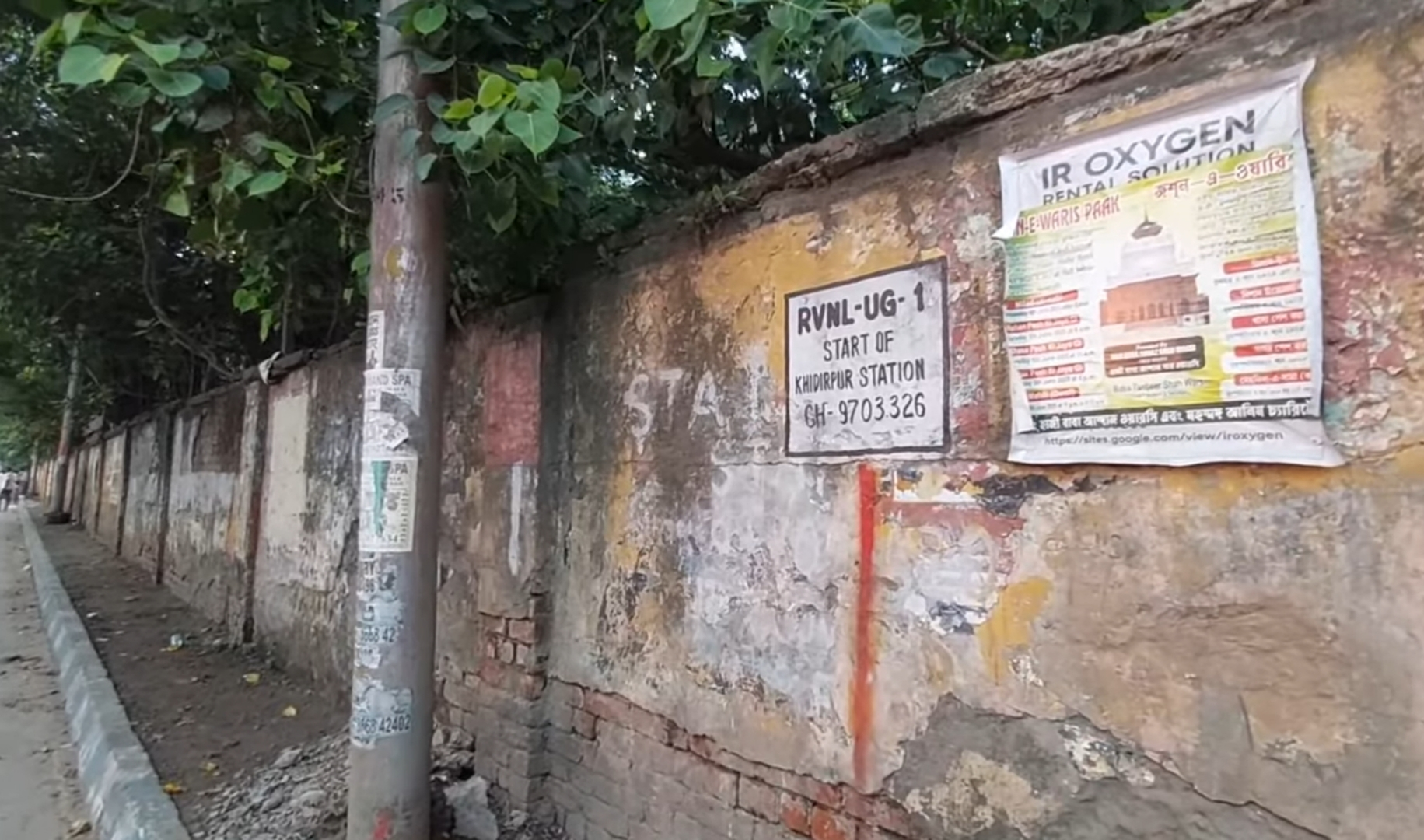
- Khidderpore metro station proposed site signage

General information
- Location: Kidderpore, Kolkata, West Bengal 700023; India
- Coordinates: 22.5380835°N 88.3275327°E
- System: Kolkata Metro station
- Operator: Metro Railway, Kolkata
- Line: Purple Line
- Platforms: side platforms
- Tracks: 2

Construction
- Structure type: Underground
- Parking: No
- Accessible: Yes

Other information
- Status: Under Construction

History
- Opening: 2030 (expected)
- Electrified: 750 V DC third rail

Future services
Preceding station	Kolkata Metro	Following station
Mominpur towards Diamond Park	Purple Line	Victoria towards Eden Gardens
Route map
Location

Khidirpur metro station is an underground metro station in Kidderpore, Kolkata, India. The station is under construction. It is a station of the Purple Line. This station will be built in the second phase of the construction of the Purple Line just below the Boys Gate of St Thomas School, Kolkata. There will be two platforms at this station.

Some students from schools especially St Thomas Boys School, whose premises are utilised for this station, were granted the rare opportunity to be the first ones to ride in this Joka-Taratala stretch after the Phase 1 inauguration.

On 10 July 2025, a significant milestone was achieved in this project as the assembled TBM–S1410 (Durga) started digging up the tunnel near Khidirpur metro station, inside the premises of St Thomas School. This digging work will continue till Park Street metro station via Victoria metro station, after which the remaining section will be done using cut-and-cover method.

== Current Tunnel Status [Khidirpore to Victoria] ==
On 10 July 2026, TBM Durga made breakthrough at Victoria Metro Station completing one of the two tunnels from Khidirpore Metro Station.

On 11 August 2026, TBM Divya the second tunnel boring machine made breakthrough at Victoria Metro Station completing both the tunnels from Khidirpore Metro Station.
