= Mominpur metro station =

Metro station in Kolkata, India

Mominpur

General information
- Location: Diamond Harbour Rd, Mominpore, Kolkata, West Bengal 700027; India
- Coordinates: 22.5191°N 88.3234°E
- System: Kolkata Metro station
- Owner: Metro Railway, Kolkata
- Operator: Kolkata Metro
- Line: Purple Line
- Platforms: Side platforms
- Tracks: 2

Construction
- Structure type: Elevated
- Accessible: Yes

Other information
- Status: Under construction

History
- Opened: 2030 (expected)

Services
Preceding station	Kolkata Metro	Following station
Majerhat towards Diamond Park	Purple Line	Khidirpur towards Eden Gardens
Route map
Location
- Location within Kolkata Metro Location within Kolkata

Mominpur Metro Station is an under-construction station of the Kolkata Metro in Mominpur, Kolkata, India. The elevated station is located near Mominpur Bus Stop. It will be a station of the Purple Line. This station will be built in the second phase of the construction of the Purple Line. There will be two platforms at this station.

== Station layout ==
It is an elevated metro station with two side platforms. It is being implemented by Rail Vikas Nigam Limited (RVNL). The station will be 180 m (590 ft)180 m long with ten spans. The platform and concourse area will be 3,100 m^{2} (33,000 sq ft) and 980 m^{2} (10,500 sq ft) respectively. It will be catered by five escalators, two elevators and four staircases.
