= Esplanade metro station =

Major interchange metro station in Kolkata, India

Esplanade
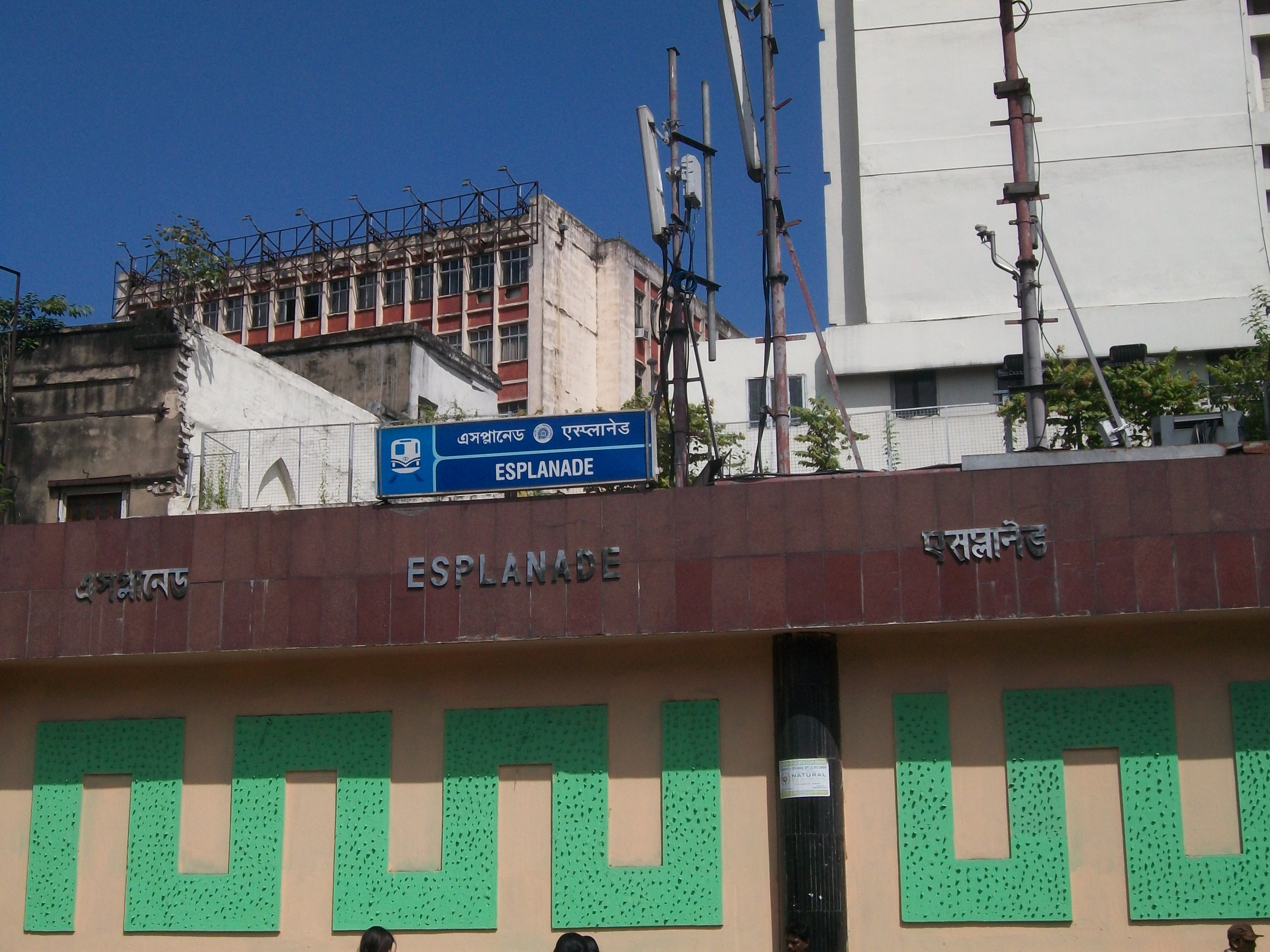
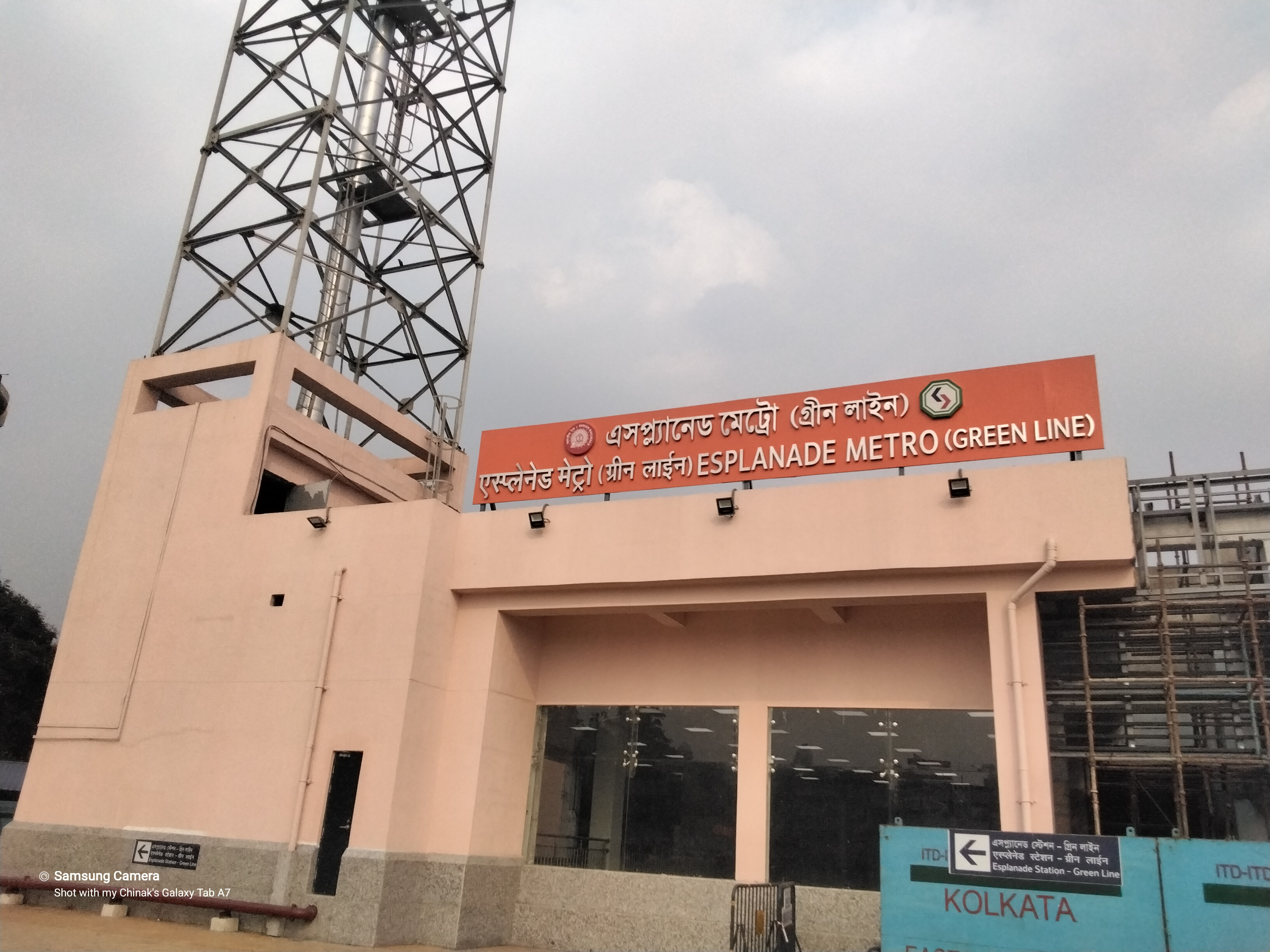
- Old Blue line structure (top), new Green line structure (bottom)

General information
- Location: Esplanade, Kolkata; West Bengal 700013; India
- Coordinates: 22.56361°N 88.35120°E
- System: Kolkata Metro
- Operator: Metro Railway, Kolkata
- Lines: Blue Line; Green Line; Purple Line (Under-construction)
- Platforms: 4; Blue Line : 2 (1 island platform); Green Line : 2 (spanish solution)
- Tracks: 4

Construction
- Structure type: Underground
- Depth: Green Line : 28 m (92 ft)
- Parking: Available
- Accessible: Yes
- Architect: Green Line : Lee Harris Pomeroy Architects with SGI

Other information
- Status: Operational
- Station code: KESP

History
- Opened: Blue Line : 1984; 42 years ago; Green Line : 15 March 2024; 2 years ago

Services
Preceding station	Kolkata Metro	Following station
Chandni Chowk towards Dakshineswar	Blue Line	Park Street towards Shahid Khudiram
Mahakaran towards Howrah Maidan	Green Line	Sealdah towards Salt Lake Sector-V
Eden Gardens Terminus	Purple Line (Future)	Park Street towards IIM-Joka
Route map
Location

Esplanade is an underground interchange metro station on the North–South corridor of the Blue Line and the East–West corridor of the Green Line of the Kolkata Metro. It is located in the Esplanade area of central Kolkata, one of the city's principal commercial and administrative districts.

Opened in 1984 as part of India's first metro railway, the station has evolved into one of the busiest interchange hubs in the network. It is situated at the northern end of Chowringhee Road, in proximity to major landmarks such as New Market and the Oberoi Grand.

The station has been extensively redeveloped to function as a multi-corridor interchange connecting the Blue, Green, and under-construction Purple Line. The Line-2 (Green Line) complex, constructed beneath the original Line-1 structure, was inaugurated on 6 March 2024, with through connectivity to Sealdah operational from 22 August 2025. The expanded station complex features modern passenger amenities and thematic murals depicting Kolkata’s cultural and historical heritage.

== History ==
Esplanade metro station was opened in 1984 as part of the first stretch of the Kolkata Metro between Dum Dum and Tollygunge (now Mahanayak Uttam Kumar), marking the beginning of metro rail operations in India.

Due to its central location in Kolkata’s commercial district, the station emerged as one of the busiest stations in the network over time.

With the development of the East–West Metro corridor, Esplanade was identified as a major interchange point. Construction of the new underground complex beneath the existing Blue Line infrastructure involved deep excavation and structural modification of the operational station.

The Green Line platforms at Esplanade were inaugurated on 6 March 2024 as part of the Esplanade–Howrah Maidan section. Subsequent extension towards Sealdah became operational on 22 August 2025, establishing Esplanade as a key interchange between multiple corridors.

== Station layout ==
Esplanade is a multi-level underground interchange station comprising interconnected complexes for different metro corridors. The original Blue Line platforms, along Chowringhee Road, are located at a relatively shallow depth, while the newer Green Line platforms, along Rani Rashmoni Avenue, are constructed at a greater depth beneath them.

The station has been designed to handle high passenger volumes, with multiple entry and exit points, interconnecting passages, escalators, and lifts. The layout enables interchange between corridors within a single paid area.

=== North–South line ===
On the second basement (L2) level, a single underground island platform serves two tracks.

G	Street level	Exit/Entrance
L1	Mezannine	Fare control, station agent, Ticket/token, shops, crossover, subway to Green Line
L2	Platform 2	Train towards Shahid Khudiram (Park Street) →
L2	Island platform, Doors will open on the right
L2	Platform 1	← Train towards Dakshineswar (Chandni Chowk)

=== East–West line ===
The Green Line station employs a Spanish solution with a combination of island and side platforms to facilitate efficient passenger movement.

G	Ground level	Exit/Entrance, Curzon Park
L1	Concourse	Fare control, station agent, Ticket/token, shops, crossover, subway to Blue Line
L2	Side platform, Doors will open on the left
L2	Platforms 1A / 1B	Train towards Salt Lake Sector-V (Sealdah) →
L2	Island platform, Doors will open on both sides
L2	Platforms 2A / 2B	← Train towards Howrah Maidan (Mahakaran)
L2	Side platform, Doors will open on the left

== Entry/exits ==
=== Blue Line ===
- 1 – Lenin Sarani, Motisil Street, Tipu Sultan Mosque, Chandni Chowk Market, Victoria House, Kolkata Municipal Corporation, S.N. Banerjee Road, New Market
- 2 – Raj Bhavan, Bentink St., CTC Bus & Tram depot, Rani Rashmoni Road, Eden Gardens, High Court, Netaji Indoor Stadium, Akash Bani Bhavan
- 3 – Bidhan Market, Shahid Minar, SBSTC Bus Stand, Press Club
- 4 – Peerless Inn, J.L. Nehru Road, New Market, Grand Hotel, Lindsay Street, Fire Station H.Q.

=== Green Line ===
- A – WBTC Bus Stand, Curzon Park, Raj Bhavan, Eden Gardens
- B – Chowringhee Road, JL Nehru Road, Chandni Chowk Market, Victoria House, Lindsay Street

== Design and architecture ==
The redeveloped Esplanade metro station incorporates modern design elements along with artistic features reflecting Kolkata’s heritage. The interiors of the Green Line complex include extensive murals and thematic installations depicting the city's culture, history, transport systems, and notable landmarks.

The station features wide concourses, improved lighting, and modern passenger amenities designed to accommodate heavy footfall. Signage and circulation systems have been planned to ensure smooth interchange between lines.

== Future developments ==
Esplanade is planned to serve as the eastern terminal of the Purple Line (Joka–Esplanade corridor), which is currently under construction.

Upon completion, the station will become a three-line interchange, further strengthening its role as the central hub of the Kolkata Metro network.

== Gallery ==
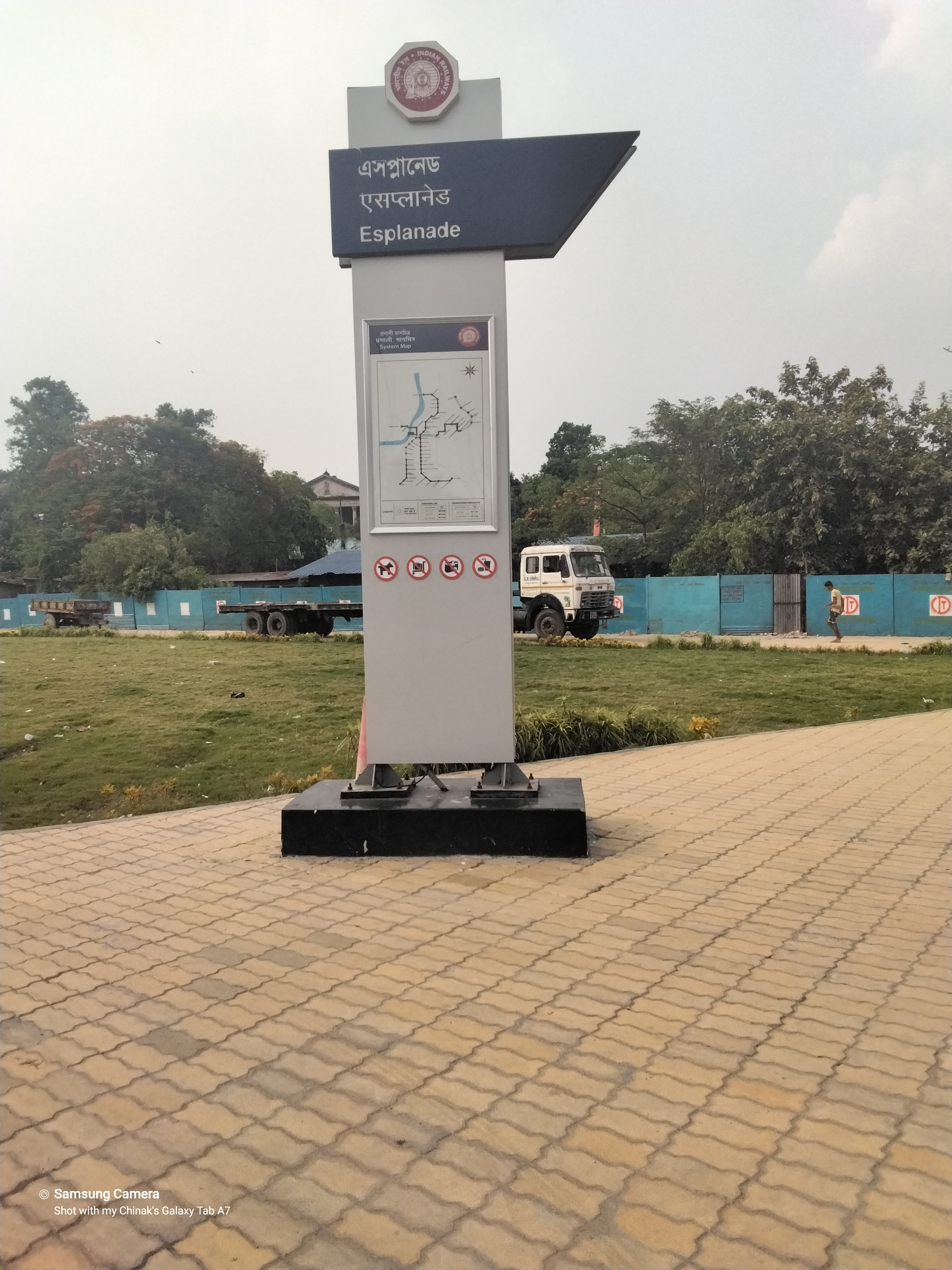
Esplanade metro signage

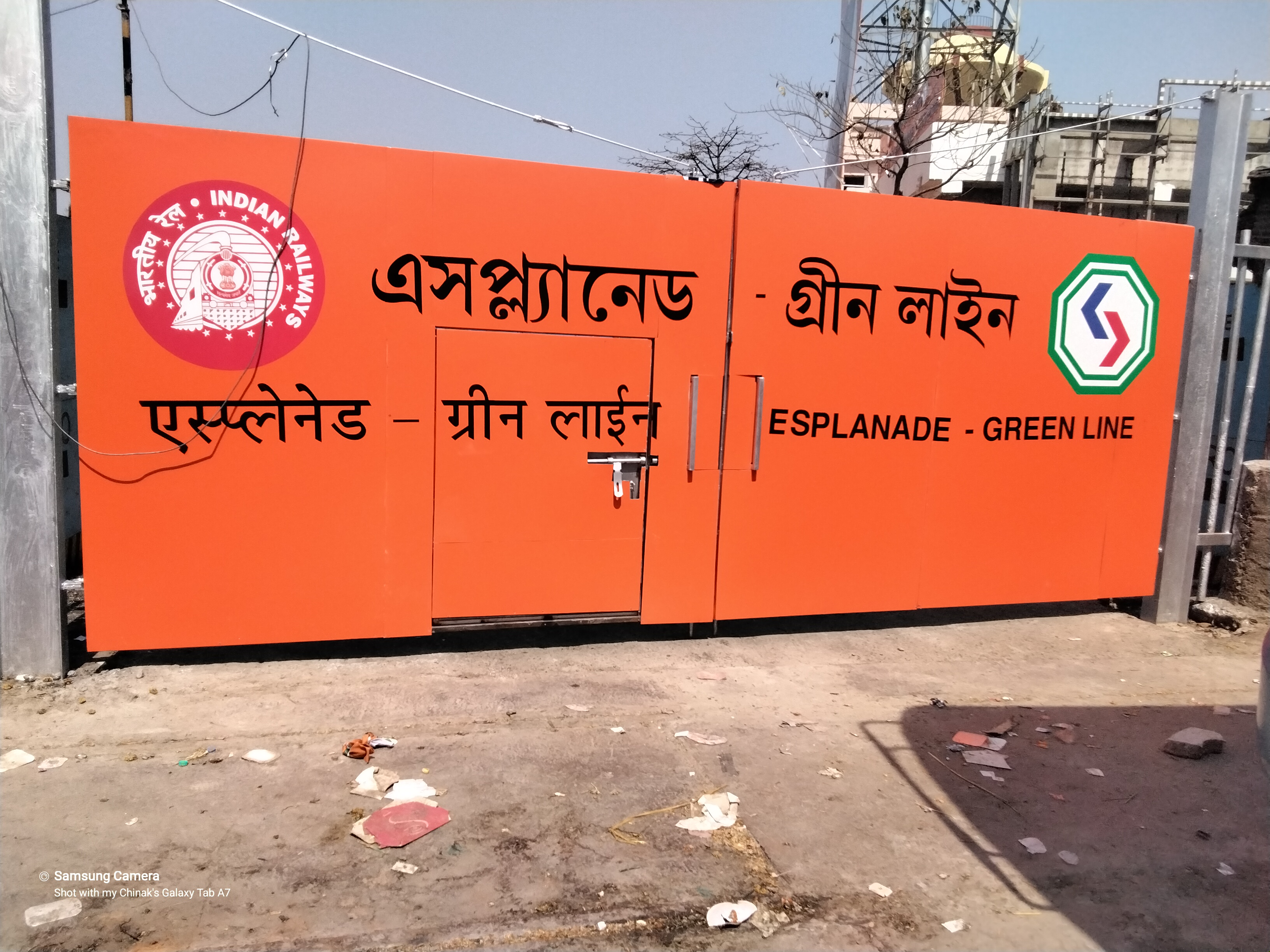
Esplanade metro construction gate

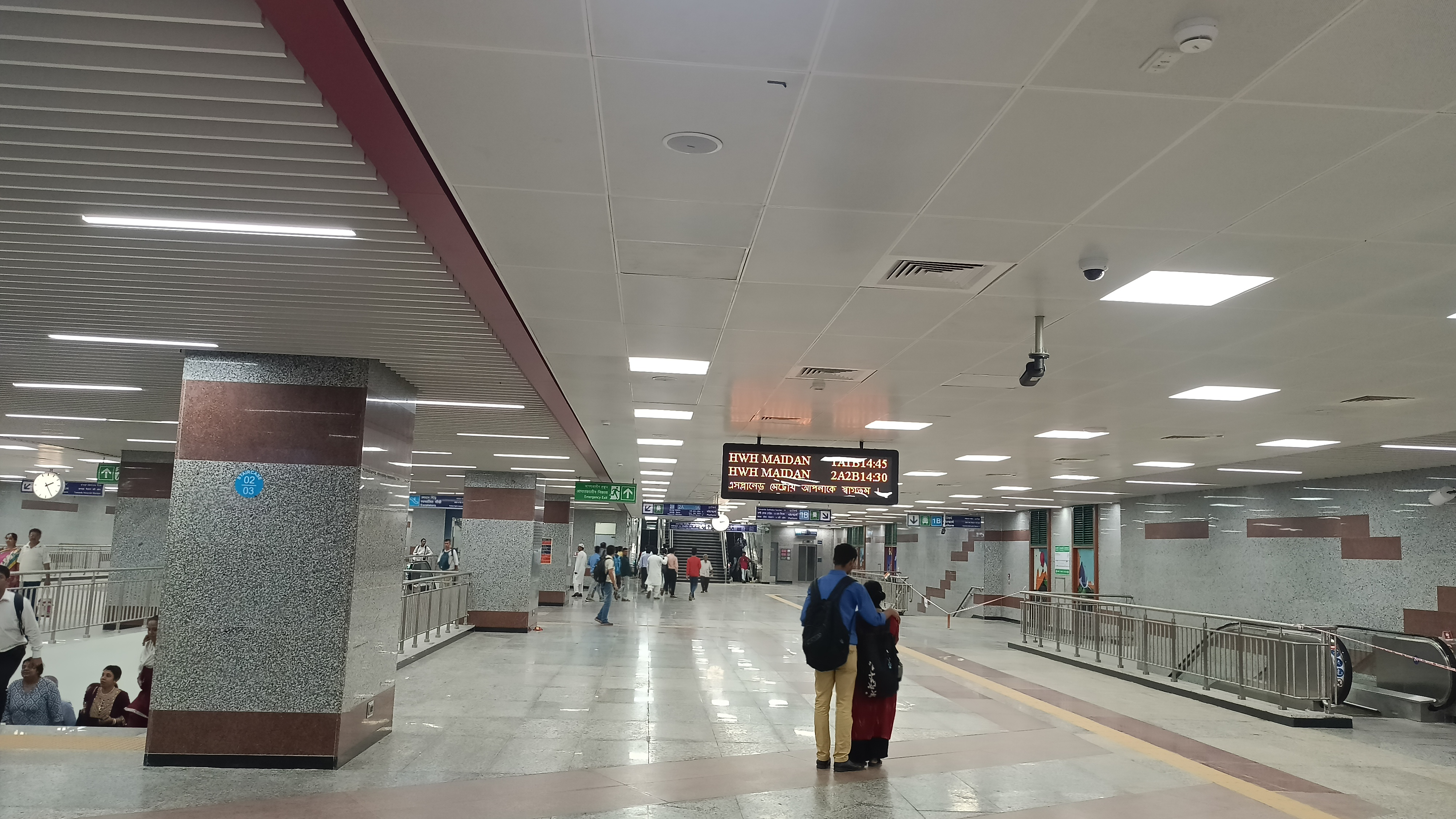
Platform level

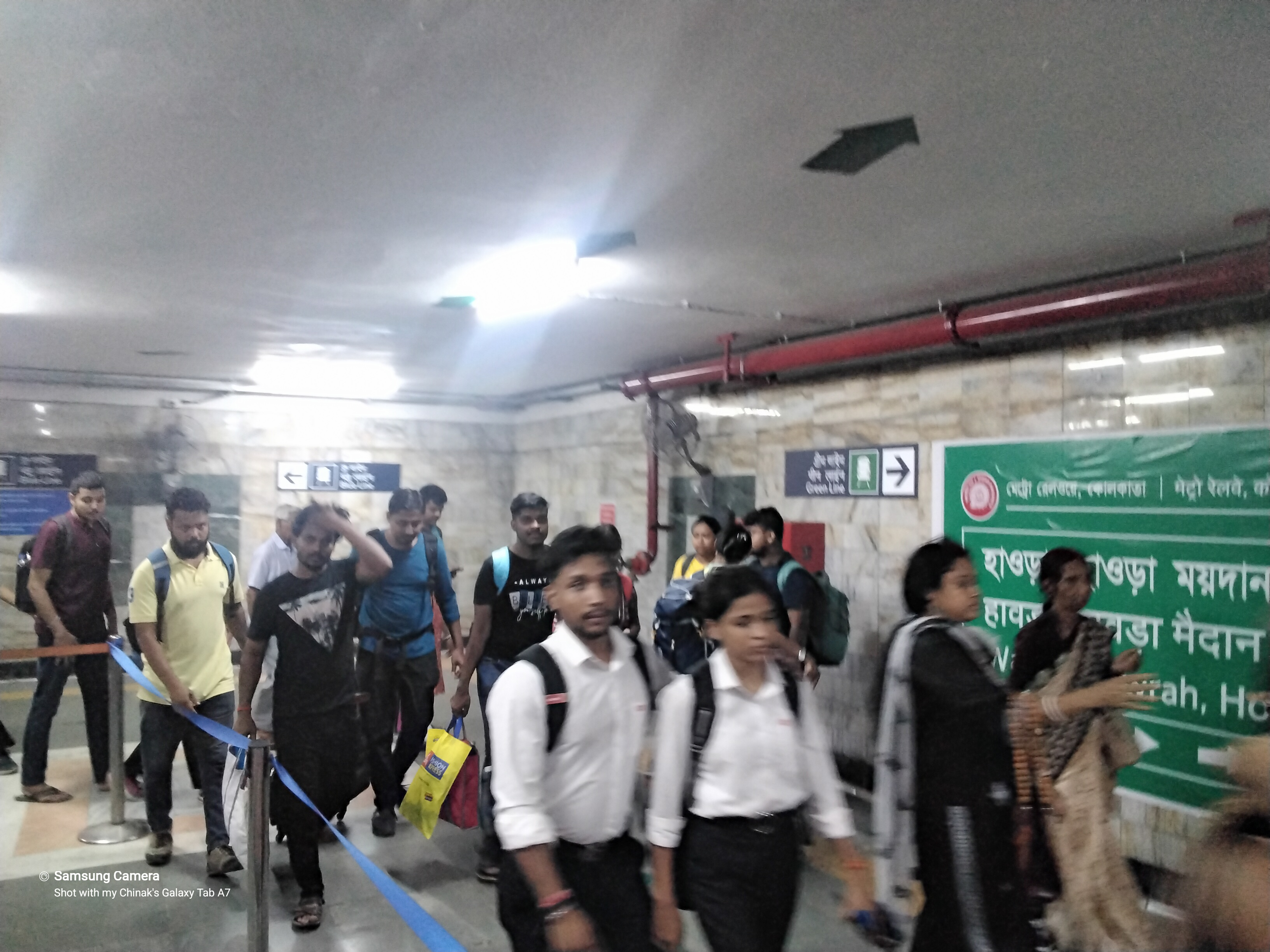
Esplanade metro station blue-green line interchange from Blue line Complex

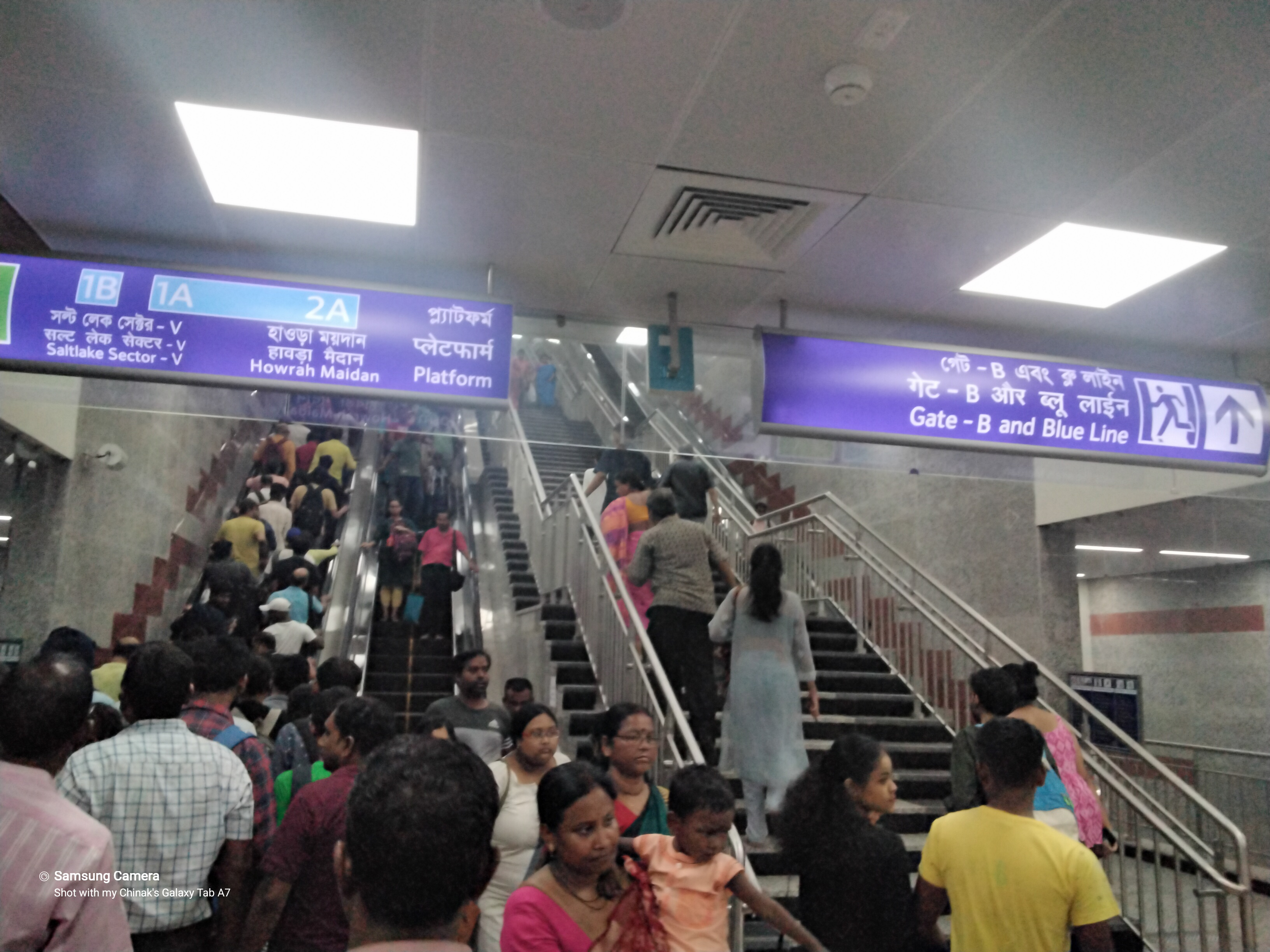
Esplanade metro station blue-green line interchange from Green line Complex

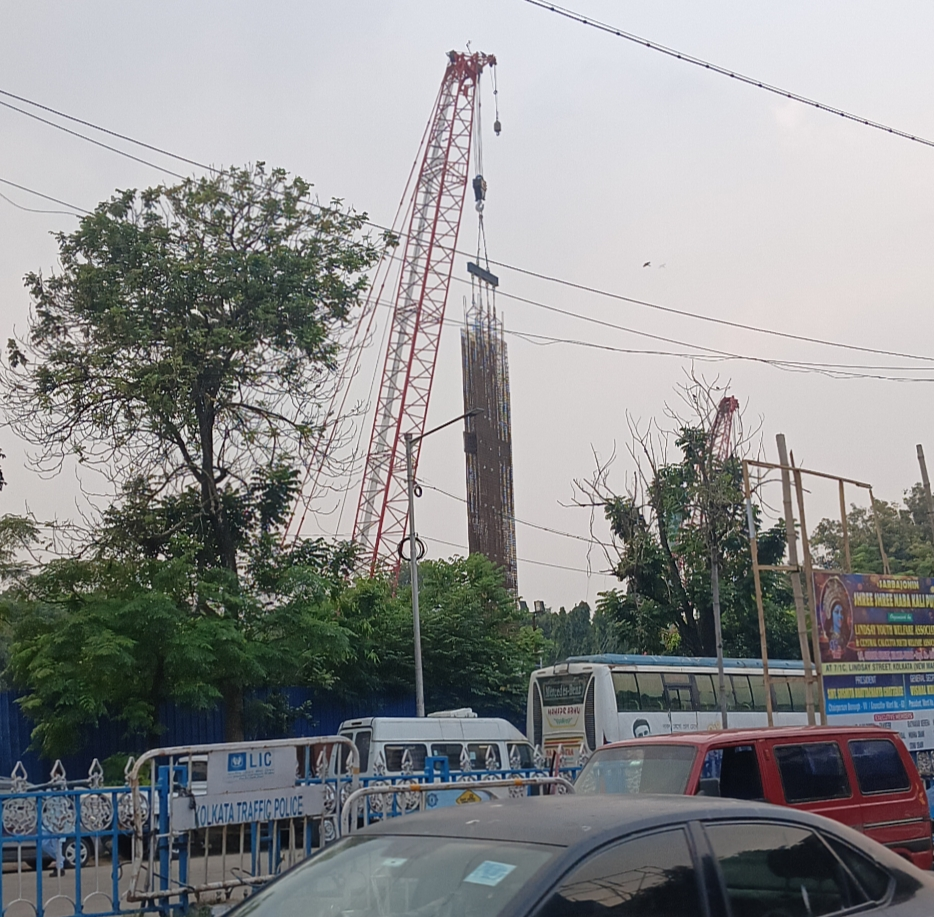
Diaphragm wall installation at purple line Esplanade metro complex

== See also ==
- Transport in Kolkata

== Other Wikimedia projects ==
- Kolkata/Esplanade travel guide from Wikivoyage
- Kolkata/Maidan travel guide from Wikivoyage
