= Purple Line (Kolkata Metro) =

Transit line in India

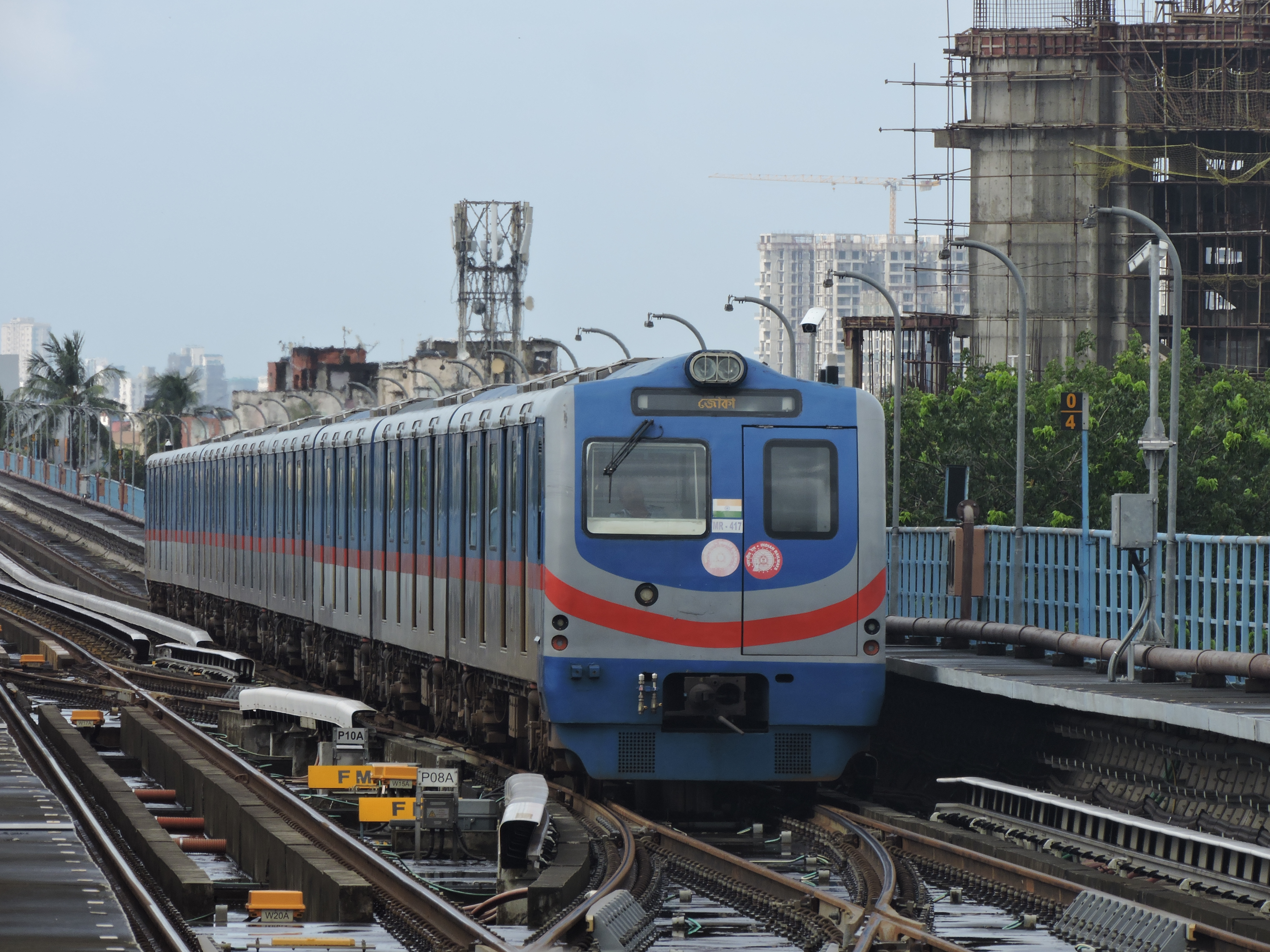

Overview
- Status: Operational
- Owner: Indian Railways
- Line number: 3
- Locale: Kolkata Metropolitan Region
- Termini: Majerhat (North); Joka (South)
- Connecting lines: Future: Blue Line; Green Line
- Stations: Operational: 7; Under construction: 5; Approved: 3
- Website: Indian Railways

Service
- Type: Rapid transit
- System: Kolkata Metro
- Operator: Metro Railway, Kolkata
- Depots: Joka Metro Depot
- Rolling stock: ICF MEDHA
- Daily ridership: ~6,000 (Weekdays); ~4,000 (Weekends)
- Ridership: 15.33 Lakhs (2025-2026)

History
- Opened: 30 December 2022; 3 years ago
- Last extension: 6 March 2024; 2 years ago

Technical
- Line length: 27.55 km (17.12 mi): Operational: 7.75 km (4.82 mi); Under construction: 8.0 km (5.0 mi); Approved: 1.5 km (0.93 mi); Planned: 8.5 km (5.3 mi)
- Number of tracks: 2
- Character: elevated
- Track gauge: 5 ft 6 in (1,676 mm) broad gauge
- Electrification: 750 V DC using third rail
- Operating speed: 80 km/h (50 mph) (designed) 65–70 km/h (40–43 mph) (commercial)
- Signalling: CBTC ATO signalling system
Route Map
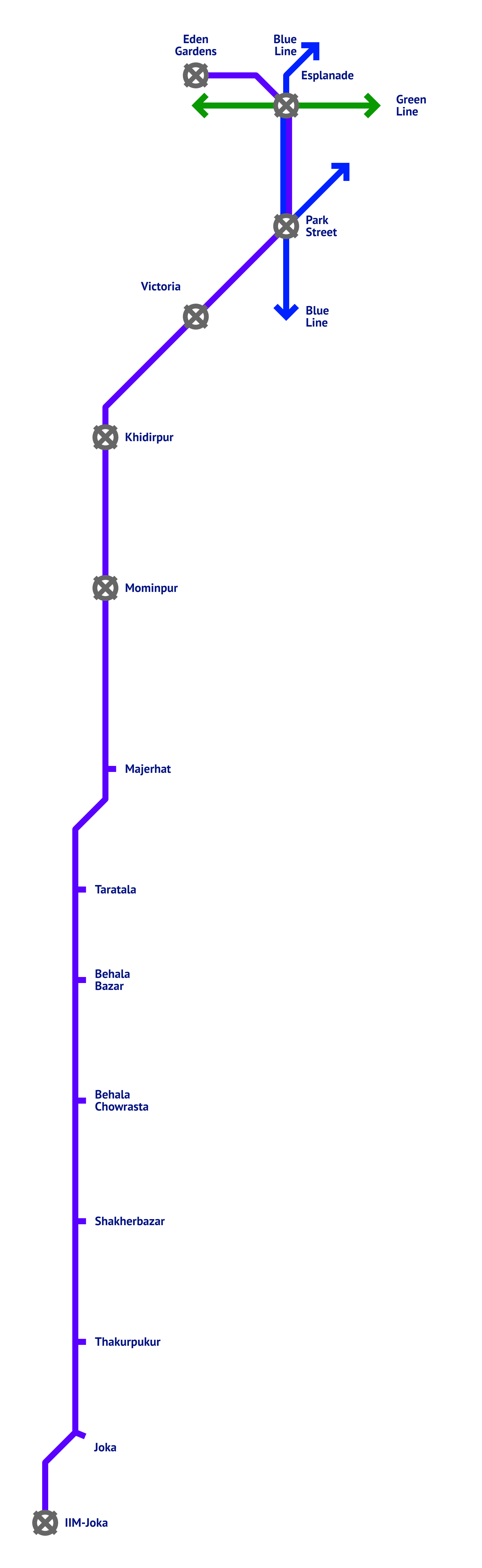

Purple Line is a rapid transit metro line of the Kolkata Metro in Kolkata, West Bengal, India. A 7.75 kilometres (4.82 mi) stretch from Joka to Majerhat of this line is operational as of 2025. This line is planned to span 26.88 kilometres (16.70 mi) from IIM-Joka in the southern region of Greater Kolkata to Eden Gardens in the Central Kolkata. It will have interchanges with Blue Line at Park Street and Esplanade and with Green Line at Esplanade.

== History ==
Previously, the stretch from Thakurpukur to Majerhat was surveyed as a branch line of the circular railway, and a metro line from Majerhat to Dakshineswar via Sealdah (interchange with Green Line) was planned. This plan was scrapped and a new metro line from further south in Joka to BBD Bagh was sanctioned in 2010–2011 with a total length of 17.22 km (10.70 mi) at an anticipated cost of ₹2,619.02 crore (equivalent to ₹64 billion or US$670 million in 2026). Later the route was truncated to Esplanade. The corridor runs along Diamond Harbour Road, Khidirpur Road, and Jawaharlal Nehru Road, major arterial roads of Kolkata, and has passenger interchange facilities with the Blue Line and Green line at Esplanade and Blue line at Park street. The proposed Esplanade station will not be the same as that of the Blue Line and Green Line but a different station that will be built at B.C. Roy market ground. The line now has a new depot in Joka. Due to land acquisition problems and objections from the Ministry of Defence, construction has been delayed several times since the beginning. Defence Ministry objected that the elevated corridor would overlook the Eastern Command headquarters at Fort William, Ordinance Depot at Mominpore. The change in alignment from elevated to underground increased the construction cost of the stretch from ₹139 crore (equivalent to ₹179 crore or US$19 million in 2026) to ₹3,000 crore (equivalent to ₹39 billion or US$400 million in 2026). The work resumed in several phases and new bids were invited by Rail Vikas Nigam Limited (RVNL) in April 2020. It is India's first metro line to run on indigenous head hardened rails, manufactured by Jindal Steel & Power. The extension of this line to IIM and Diamond Park for 2 km (1.2 mi) was sanctioned in the 2012–2013 Budget at a cost of ₹294.49 crore (equivalent to ₹606 crore or US$63 million in 2026). The work is being executed by RVNL.

The Mominpur metro station was planned to be built across a 2500 sq. m area. However, the Ministry of Defence objected to the elevated structure, saying that it would overlook the Ordnance depot. This forced RVNL to stall the entire project, and RVNL almost dropped the station from the plan even though it alone would have a projected 20,000 passengers during peak hours. Underground Mominpur station was also not possible due to the sharp gradient from Taratala metro station. After a series of discussions and consultations with the Ministry of Defence and Government of West Bengal in 2016, it was decided to shift the station around 1 km (0.62 mi) northward, near the Alipore Bodyguard Lines. But, after a year Defence Ministry approved the Mominpur metro station in its original location as the change in alignment would have delayed the project and budget overrun. It will be the last elevated station of the corridor. Now, the proposed underground Khidirpur metro station is planned at the Alipore Bodyguard Lines. There were also hurdles regarding clearance for tunneling under defence lands. In 2020, the Defence Ministry eased out the process as lease rent wasn't required anymore for tunneling as long the overground ownership of the land did not change. On 30 December 2022 the Joka - Taratala section and on 6 March 2024, the Taratala - Majerhat section was inaugurated remotely by Prime Minister Narendra Modi, completing the 7.75 km Phase 1 stretch.

Commercial Operations between Joka and Majerhat began on 6 March 2024

The service starts from Joka starts at 6:40 am and at Majherhat from 7:03 am and ends at Joka at 9:05 pm and at Majherhat at 9:26 pm , with 84 pairs of services from Monday to Friday. The trains run at a frequency of first 2 service from Joka and 1 service from Majerhat are 23 minutes and rest services are 21 minutes.

In a separate development, Kolkata metro has announced that the Purple Line, running between Joka and Majerhat, will be available on Saturdays as well. The services are expected to cater to the large population employed in the IT sector.

The services have begun on 22 November 2025. According to a press release by the Kolkata Metro Rail Corporation, a total of 40 services, 20 UP and 20 Down, will operate every Saturday at an interval of 21 minutes.

On Saturdays, the first train will depart from Joka to Majerhat at 1:25 PM, while the first train from Majerhat will leave at 1:49 PM for Joka. The last service from Joka to Majerhat will run at 8:11 pm. The final train from Majerhat to Joka will depart at 8.32 pm. The frequency of first 2 trains from Joka are 28 minutes and first 1 train from Majerhat is 24 minutes, rest services are of 21 minutes. There are no services on Sundays.

On 12 January 2025, it was reported that Metro authorities decided to extend the line to Eden Gardens instead of Esplanade to facilitate commuters and connect Strand Road, BBD Bag and Calcutta High Court. Subsequently, in March 2025 railways sanctioned ₹1,000 crore (equivalent to ₹21 billion or US$210 million in 2026) for the extension.

On 25 March 2025, The Times of India reported that Metro railway sent a proposal to Ministry of Railways to extend the Diamond Park Branch to Tollygunge, which will be 8.5 km (5.3 mi) long. In this route three underground station at Thakurpukur Cancer Hospital, Ramchandrapur and Panchanantala will come.

== Development ==
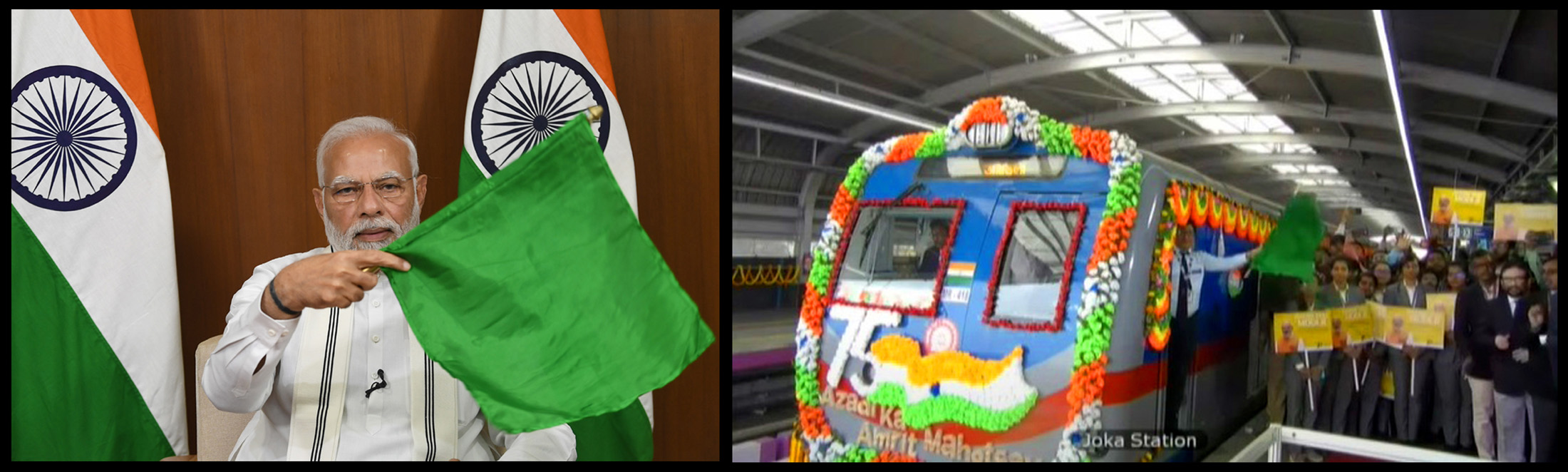
Prime Minister Narendra Modi inaugurates the Joka-Majerhat stretch of Purple Line of Kolkata Metro on December 30, 2022.

Around 8.5 kilometres (5.3 mi) of the project will be elevated and the rest of 6.32 kilometres (3.93 mi) of the metro line will be underground. The project is getting delayed due to nonavailability of land for the construction of train depot at Joka. In 2019, RVNL was given the land required for building the depot and the construction for its boundary wall and land development started in February 2019. Tenders for its construction and plant & machinery were invited in April 2020.

Construction was further delayed in September 2018 due to the Majerhat Bridge collapse, the metro was being built right next to the bridge.

Tender for Majherhat to Esplanade underground section has been floated in 1st week of December 2019.

By 15 September 2022, the stretch from Joka to Taratala has been fully constructed and electrification has been done. Testing trials are underway from Joka to Taratala using the old decommissioned Metro Rakes. Eventually in service there will be new air conditioned metro rakes. The stretch from Majerhat to Esplanade is under construction.

Prime Minister Narendra Modi inaugurated the Joka-Taratala stretch, including Joka metro station of Kolkata Metro's Purple Line on 30 December 2022 in the presence of West Bengal Chief Minister Mamata Banerjee and Indian Railway Minister Ashwini Vaishnaw. Some students from schools especially St Thomas Boys School, whose premises are utilised for planned Khidirpur metro station in this stretch, were granted the rare opportunity to be the first ones to ride in this Joka-Taratala stretch after the inauguration.

The Taratala–Majerhat section of Kolkata Metro Purple Line was inaugurated on 6 March 2024 by Prime Minister Narendra Modi, along with the truncated sections of Esplanade–Howrah Maidan under Green Line and Kavi Subhash–Hemanta Mukhopadhyay under Orange Line.

On 10 July 2025, a significant milestone was achieved in this project as the assembled TBM– S1410 (Durga) started digging up the tunnel near Khidirpur metro station, inside the premises of St Thomas School. This digging work will continue till Park Street metro station via Victoria metro station, after which the remaining section will be done using cut-and-cover method.

== Timeline ==
The following dates given are of Commercial Passenger Service and not of Inauguration Day.

History
Extension date	Terminals		Length
02 January 2023	Joka	Taratala	6.49 kilometers (4.03 mi)
15 March 2024	Taratala	Majerhat	1.25 kilometers (0.78 mi)
Total	Joka	Majerhat	7.74 kilometers (4.81 mi)

=== Trial Runs:- ===
15 September 2022 -> The first ever maiden trial run on Phase - IA, .i.e, from Joka Metro Station to Taratala Metro Station was conducted successfully with a NON-AC Metro Rake [Rake Number - 8N 14/12].

13 January 2024 -> The first maider trial run on Phase - IB, i.e., from Taratala Metro Station to Majerhat Metro Station was conducted successfully with a AC Medha Rake [Rake Number: MR-417].

=== Inaugural Runs:- ===
30 December 2022 -> The stretch from Joka Metro Station to Taratala Metro Station was inaugurated.

06 March 2024 -> The stretch from Taratala Metro Station to Majerhat Metro Station was inaugurated.

== List of stations ==
The work has been sanctioned in 2010-11 for the new Metro line from Joka to B.B.D. Bagh for a length of 16.72 km (10.39 mi) at an anticipated cost of Rs. 2619.02 Crores. But, later the route was shortened and planned to terminate at Esplanade. A separate Depot was built by RVNL in Joka. The tender has gone to Simplex Infrastructures. The extension of this line to IIM and Diamond Park for 3.39 km (2.11 mi) has been sanctioned in the Budget of 2012–13 at a cost of Rs. 294.49 Cr. Another extension from Esplanade to Eden Gardens has been sanctioned in March 2025 by Ministry of Railways at a cost of Rs. 1000 Cr. The execution of this work has been entrusted to RVNL.

There 2 phases of work and 4 extensions are planned in this line –

- Phase 1:
  - Joka to Majherhat (Operational)
- Phase 2:
  - Majherhat to Esplanade (Under Construction)
- Extensions:
  - IIM-Joka to Joka (Approved)
  - IIM-Joka to Diamond Park (Approved)
  - Diamond Park to Mahanayak Uttam Kumar (Proposed)

Purple Line (Main Line)
No.	Station Name		Station Code	Distance (km)	Opening	Connections	Layout	Platform Type
	English	Bengali	Station Code	Distance (km)	Opening	Connections	Layout	Platform Type
1	IIM-Joka	আইআইএম জোকা	-	0	Approved		Elevated	TBD
2	Joka	জোকা	KJKA	1.572	30 December 2022		Elevated	Side
3	Thakurpukur	ঠাকুরপুকুর	KTKP	1.45	30 December 2022		Elevated	Side
4	Sakher Bazar	সখেরবাজার	KSKB	1.22	30 December 2022		Elevated	Side
5	Behala Chowrasta	বেহালা চৌরাস্তা	KBCR	1.45	30 December 2022		Elevated	Side
6	Behala Bazar	বেহালা বাজার	KBBR	1.34	30 December 2022		Elevated	Side
7	Taratala	তারাতলা	KTRT	1.03	30 December 2022		Elevated	Side
8	Majerhat	মাঝেরহাট	KMJH	1.25	6 March 2024	Majerhat	Elevated	Side
9	Mominpur	মোমিনপুর	KMMP	1.015	2030		Elevated	TBD
10	Khidirpur	খিদিরপুর	KDDP	1.115	2030		Underground	TBD
11	Victoria	ভিক্টোরিয়া	KVCT	2.155	2030		Underground	TBD
12	Park Street	পার্ক স্ট্রিট	KPSK	1.265	2030	Blue Line	Underground	TBD
13	Esplanade	এসপ্ল্যানেড	KESP	0.925	2030	Blue Line; Green Line	Underground	TBD
14	Eden Gardens	ইডেন গার্ডেনস	-	–	2030	Eden Gardens	Underground	TBD

Purple Line (Branch Line)
No.	Station Name		Distance (km)	Opening	Connections	Layout	Platform Type
	English	Bengali	Distance (km)	Opening	Connections	Layout	Platform Type
1	IIM-Joka	আইআইএম জোকা		Approved		Elevated	TBD
2	Diamond Park	ডায়মন্ড পার্ক		Approved		Elevated	TBD
3	Thakurpukur Cancer Hospital	ঠাকুরপুকুর ক্যান্সার হাসপাতাল		Proposed		Underground	TBD
4	Ramchandrapur	রামচন্দ্রপুর		Proposed		Underground	TBD
5	Panchanantala	পঞ্চাননতলা		Proposed		Underground	TBD
6	Mahanayak Uttam Kumar	মহানায়ক উত্তম কুমার		Proposed	Blue Line	At-grade	TBD

== Rolling stock ==
=== ICF/MEDHA 400 SERIES CBTC ===
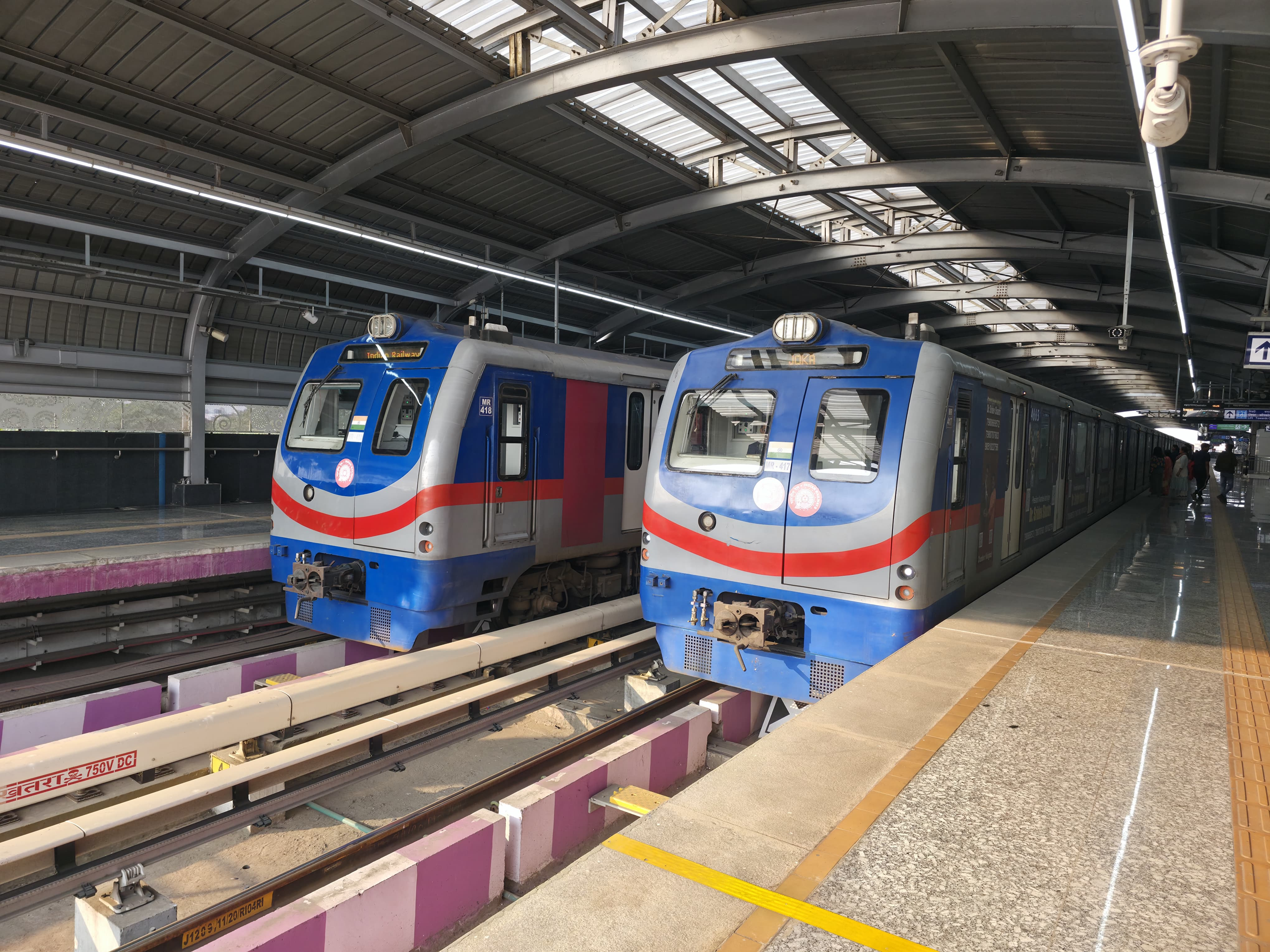

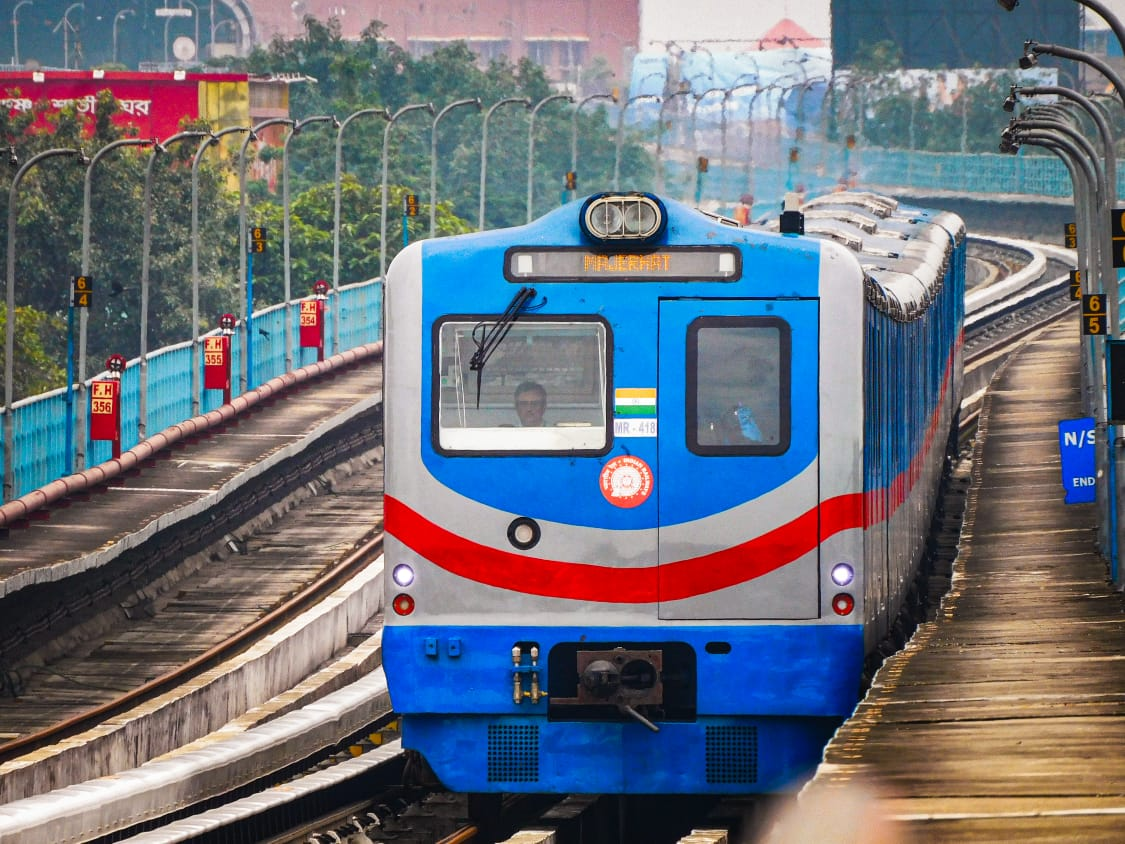

=== ICF/MEDHA 800 SERIES CBTC ===
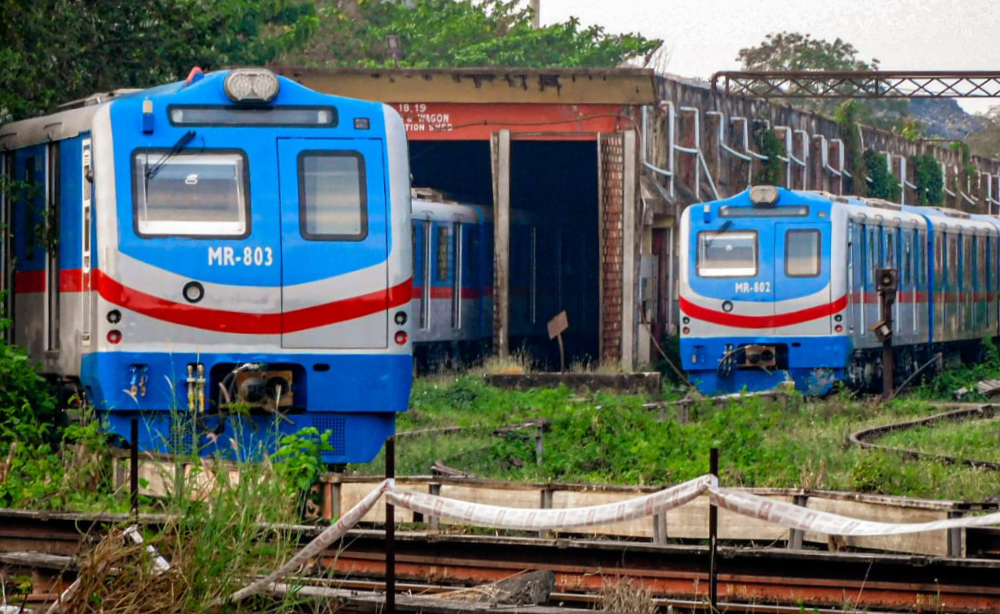

== Gallery ==
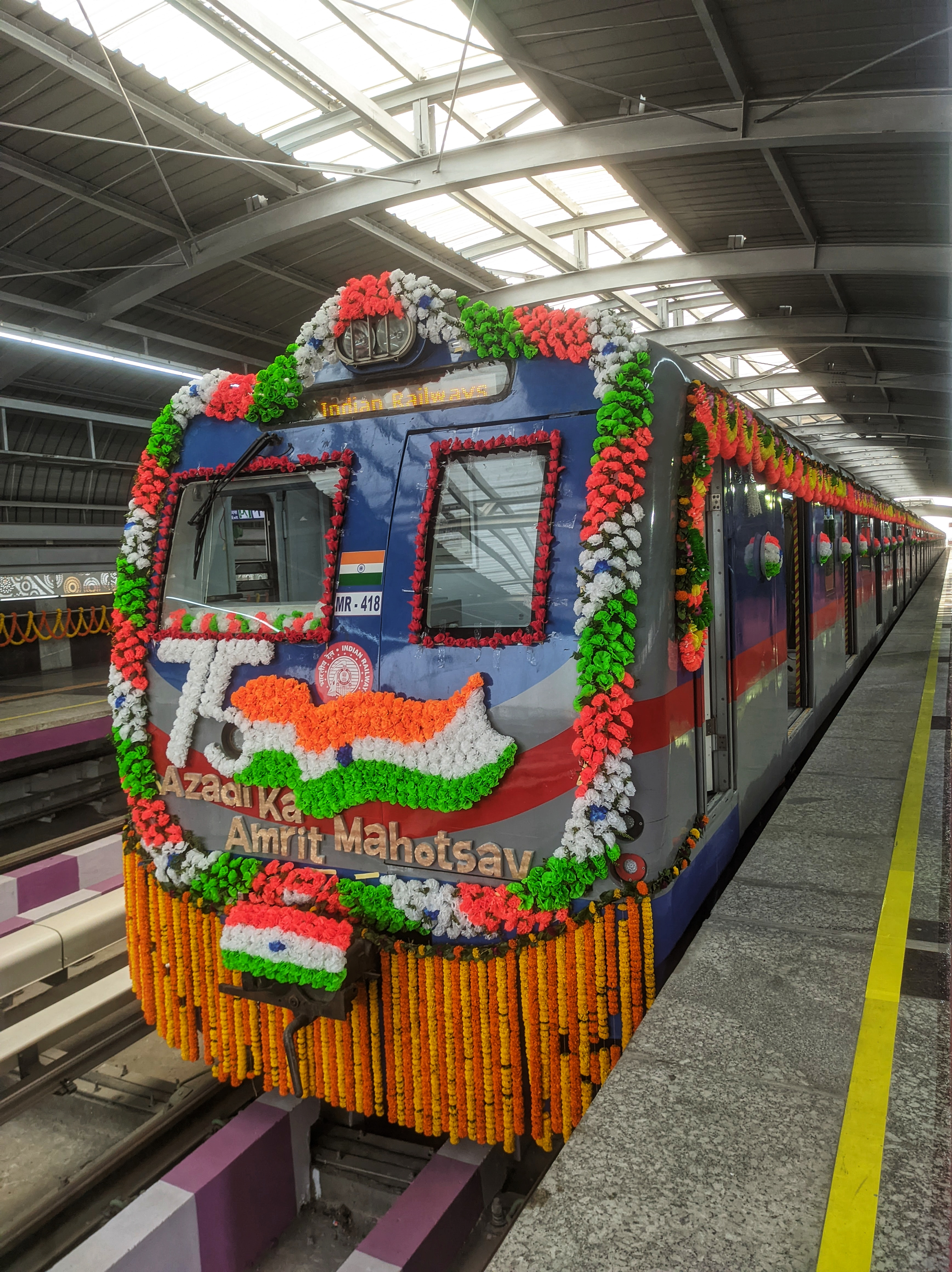
ICF Medha rake MR 418 on the day of inauguration of Purple Line at Joka metro station

The day of inauguration of phase 1

== See also ==
- List of Kolkata metro stations
- Kolkata Metro Rolling Stock
- 2018 Kolkata bridge collapse
- Kolkata Suburban Railway
