= Jeevan Deep =

Jeevan Sudha
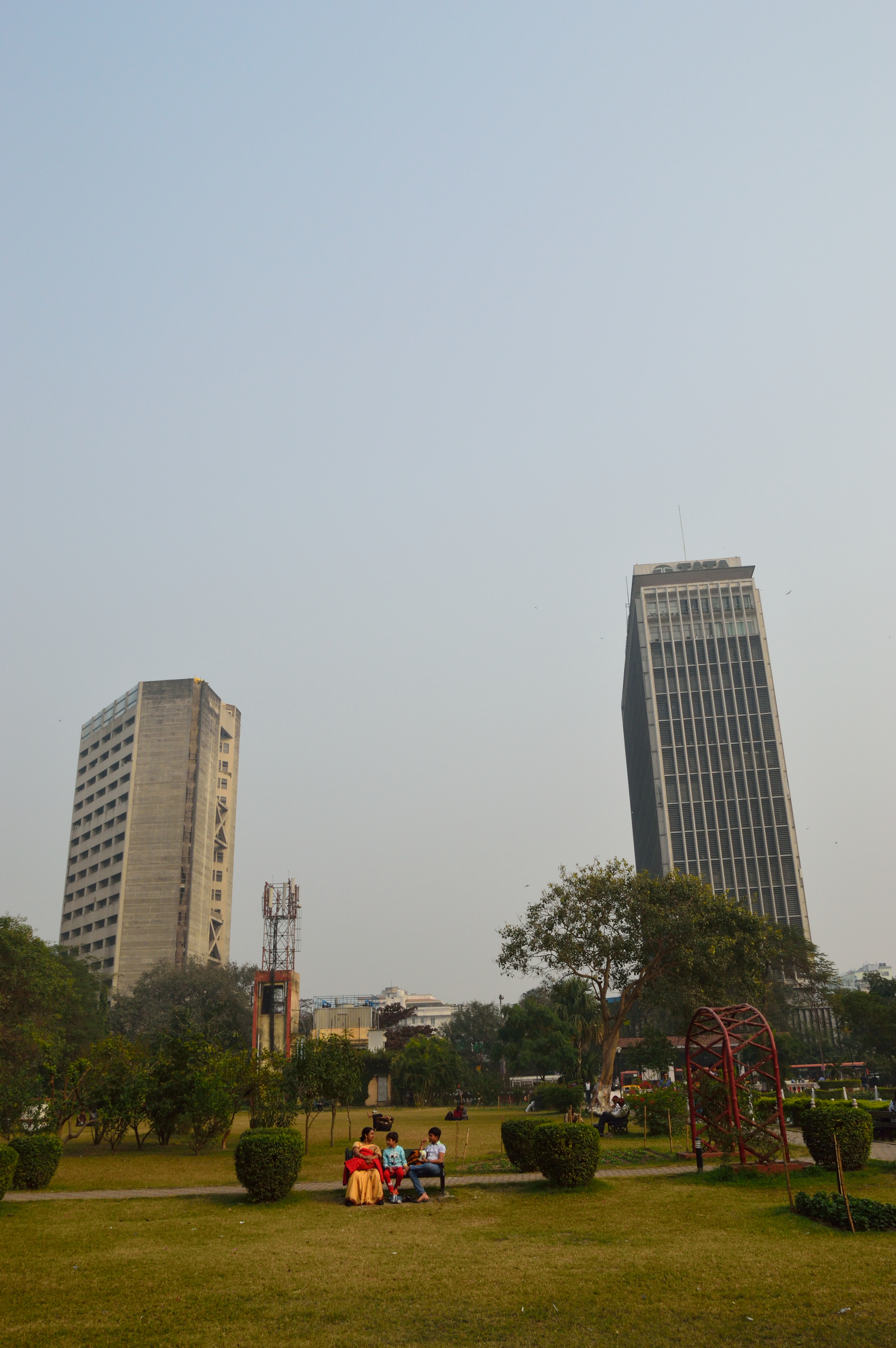
- View of Jeevan Sudha (left) along with Tata Centre from Elliot Park

General information
- Status: Completed
- Location: Kolkata, India

Height
- Height: 72 metres (236 ft)

Technical details
- Floor count: 19

Design and construction
- Developer: LIC

Jeevan Sudha (also known as Jeevan Deep) is a high-rise commercial building located in Kolkata, India. It is located on Chowringhee Road beside Tata Centre.

== Details ==
Jeevan Sudha is one of the landmarks in Chowringhee, the central business district of the city. It is a commercial building and was built in 1986 by Life Insurance Corporation of India. This building has 19 floors with a total height of 72 metres (236 ft). It has many offices of LIC, banks like the State Bank of India NRI Branch and other financial organisations.

== See also ==
- List of tallest buildings in Kolkata
