= Victoria metro station (Kolkata) =

Metro station

Victoria
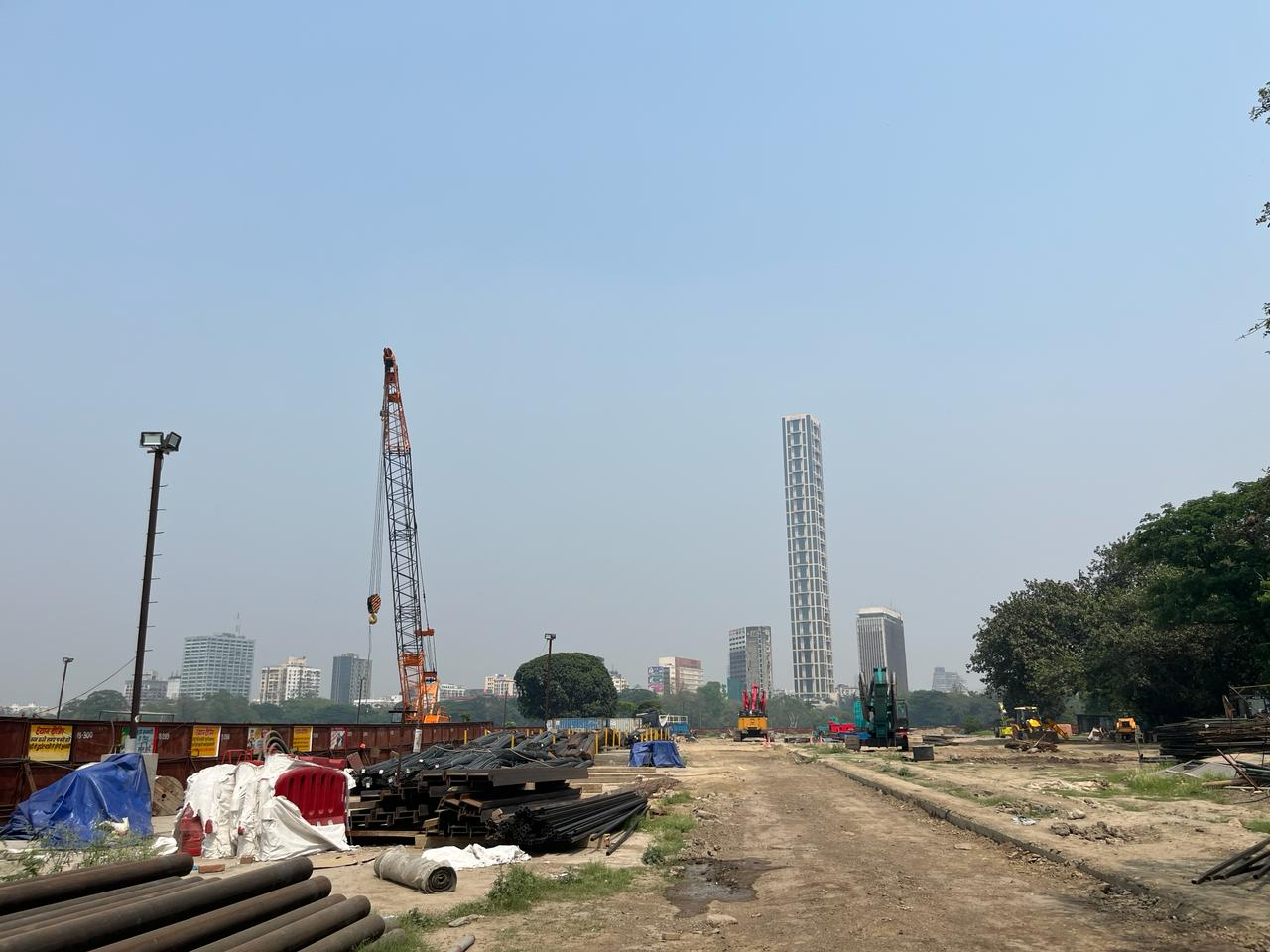
- Construction work of the Victoria metro station

General information
- Location: Hastings, Kolkata, West Bengal 700071; India
- Coordinates: 22.551344°N 88.341615°E
- System: Kolkata Metro station
- Operator: Metro Railway, Kolkata
- Line: Purple Line
- Platforms: Island platform
- Tracks: 2
- Connections: Victoria Memorial

Construction
- Structure type: Underground
- Parking: yes
- Accessible: Yes

Other information
- Status: Under Construction

History
- Opening: 2030 (expected)
- Former names: Hastings

Future services
Preceding station	Kolkata Metro	Following station
Khidirpur towards Diamond Park	Purple Line	Park Street towards Eden Gardens
Route map
Location
- Location within Kolkata Metro Location within Kolkata

Victoria is an under construction underground station of the Kolkata Metro in Kolkata, West Bengal. It is a station of the Purple Line at Hastings. Victoria station is located between Park Street and Kidderpore metro station. This station will be built in the second phase of the construction of the Purple Line. There will be two platforms at this station.

On 10 July 2025, a significant milestone was achieved in this project as the assembled TBM–S1410 (Durga) started digging up the tunnel near Khidirpur metro station, inside the premises of St Thomas School. This digging work will continue till Park Street metro station via Victoria metro station, after which the remaining section will be done using cut-and-cover method.
