= Park Street metro station (Kolkata) =

Metro station in Kolkata, India

Park Street
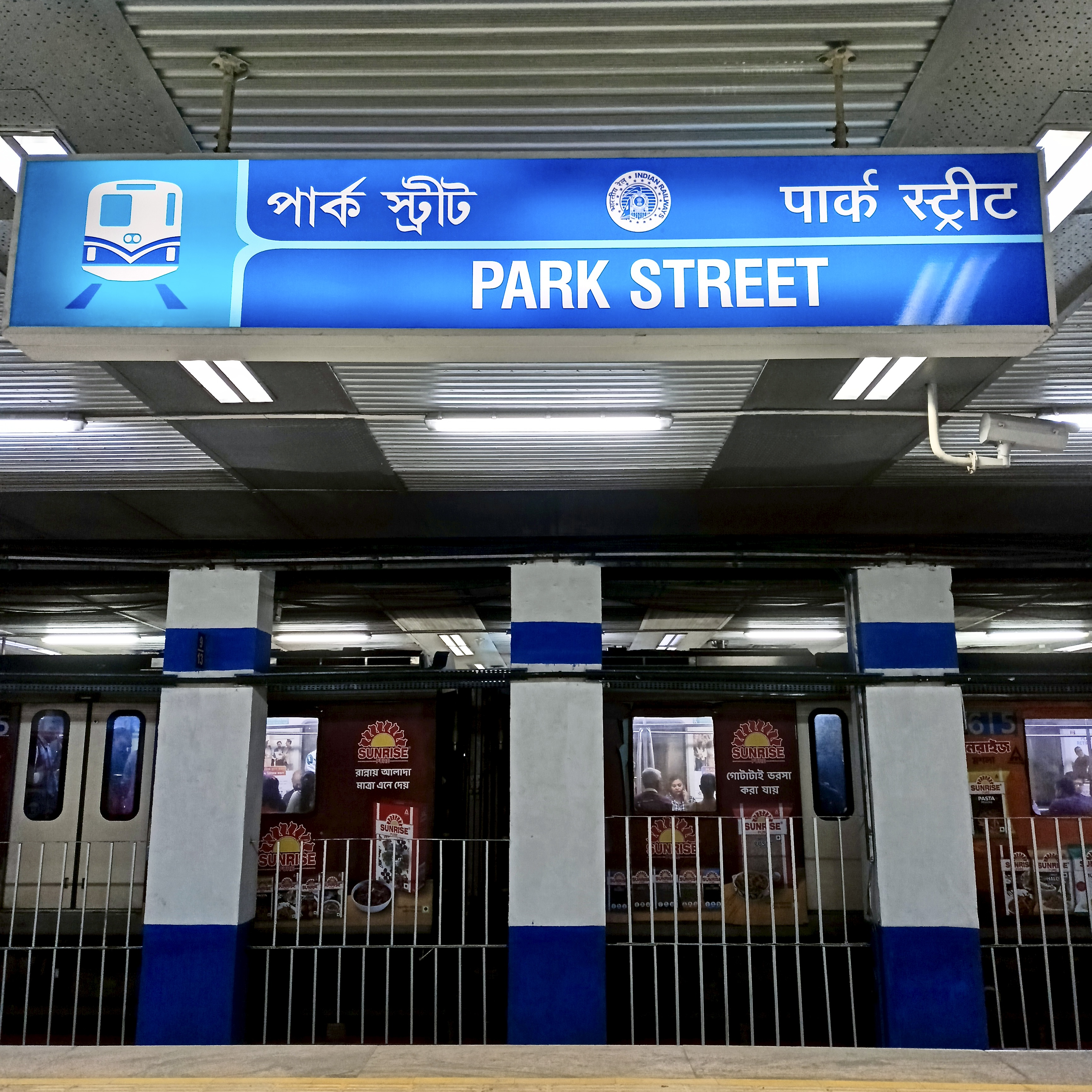
- Platform view of Park Street metro station on the Kolkata Metro Blue Line, Kolkata, India

General information
- Other names: IIHM Park Street
- Location: Park Street area Kolkata, West Bengal 700071; India
- Coordinates: 22.55445°N 88.34985°E
- System: Kolkata Metro
- Operator: Metro Railway, Kolkata
- Lines: Blue Line; Purple Line
- Platforms: 2 (1 island platform)

Construction
- Structure type: Underground
- Accessible: No

Other information
- Station code: KPSK

History
- Opened: 24 October 1984; 41 years ago

Services
Preceding station	Kolkata Metro	Following station
Esplanade towards Dakshineswar	Blue Line	Maidan towards Shahid Khudiram
Esplanade towards Eden Gardens	Purple Line (Future)	Victoria towards IIM-Joka
Route map
Location

Park Street (also known as IIHM Park Street for sponsorship reason) is an underground metro station on the North-South corridor of the Blue Line of Kolkata Metro in Kolkata, West Bengal, India. The station is located on the crossing of Chowringhee Road and Park Street.

== Station layout ==
G	Street level	Exit/Entrance
L1	Concourse	Fare control, station agent, Metro QR ticket vending machines, crossover
L2	Side platform, Doors will open on the left
L2	Platform 2	Towards Shahid Khudiram (Maidan) →
L2	Platform 1	← Towards Dakshineswar (Esplanade)
L2	Side platform, Doors will open on the left

== Gallery ==
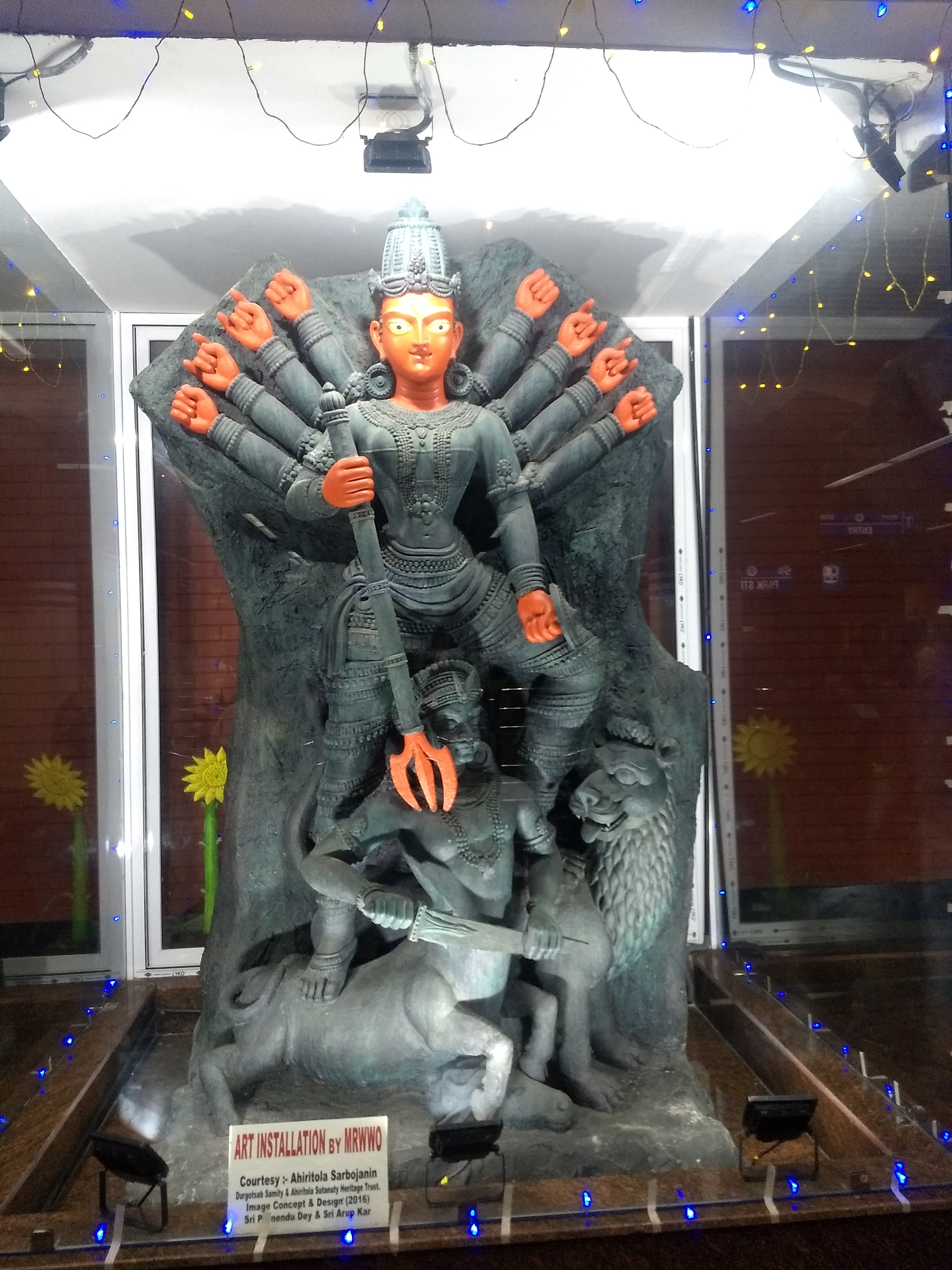
This idol worshipped in Ahiritola Sarbajanin in 2016, now kept in Park Street Metro Station

Outside Park Street Metro Station

== See also ==
- Kolkata
- List of Kolkata Metro stations
- Transport in Kolkata
- Kolkata Metro Rail Corporation
- Kolkata Suburban Railway
- Kolkata Monorail
- Trams in Kolkata
- Bhowanipore
- Chowringhee Road
- List of rapid transit systems
- List of metro systems
