= Şakir =

Şakir (Turkish: Şakir) is a Turkish masculine given name and surname. Şakir or Sakir may refer to:

== Given name ==
- Şakir Bayhan (1938–2019), Turkish lexicographer and forestry engineer
- Şakir Bilgin (born 1951), Turkish-German writer
- Şakir Deniz, stage name Şakiro (1936–1996), Kurdish singer
- Şakir Eczacıbaşı (1929–2010), Turkish businessman, pharmacist and photographer
- Şakir Özkan Torunlar (born 1960), Turkish diplomat
- Šakir Redžepi (born 1987), Macedonian footballer
- Şakir Selim (1942–2008), Crimean Tatar poet and translator
- Şakir Yavuz (born 1968), German executive and philanthropist

== Surname and middle name ==
- Abdul Kayum Sakir (born 1973), Afghan militant and US prisoner
- Ahmed Cevat Şakir Pasha (1851–1900), Ottoman statesman and army commander
- Bahaeddin Şakir (1874–1922), Turkish politician and nationalist
- Cevat Şakir Kabaağaçlı (1890–1973), Turkish writer
- Fahrennisa Şakir, also known as Princess Fahrelnissa Zeid (1901–1991), Turkish artist and noblewoman
- Fatma Şakir Memik (1903–1991), Turkish doctor, politician and parliamentarian
- Mehmed Şakir Pasha (1855–1914), Ottoman diplomat, army commander and historian
- Sakir-Har, Pharaoh of the Fifteenth dynasty of Egypt

== See also ==
- Shakir
- Sakr
- Şakirbey, Biga, village in Turkey
- Şakirpaşa, neighborhood in Adana, Turkey
