= Taratala metro station =

Kolkata Metro's Purple Line metro station

Taratala
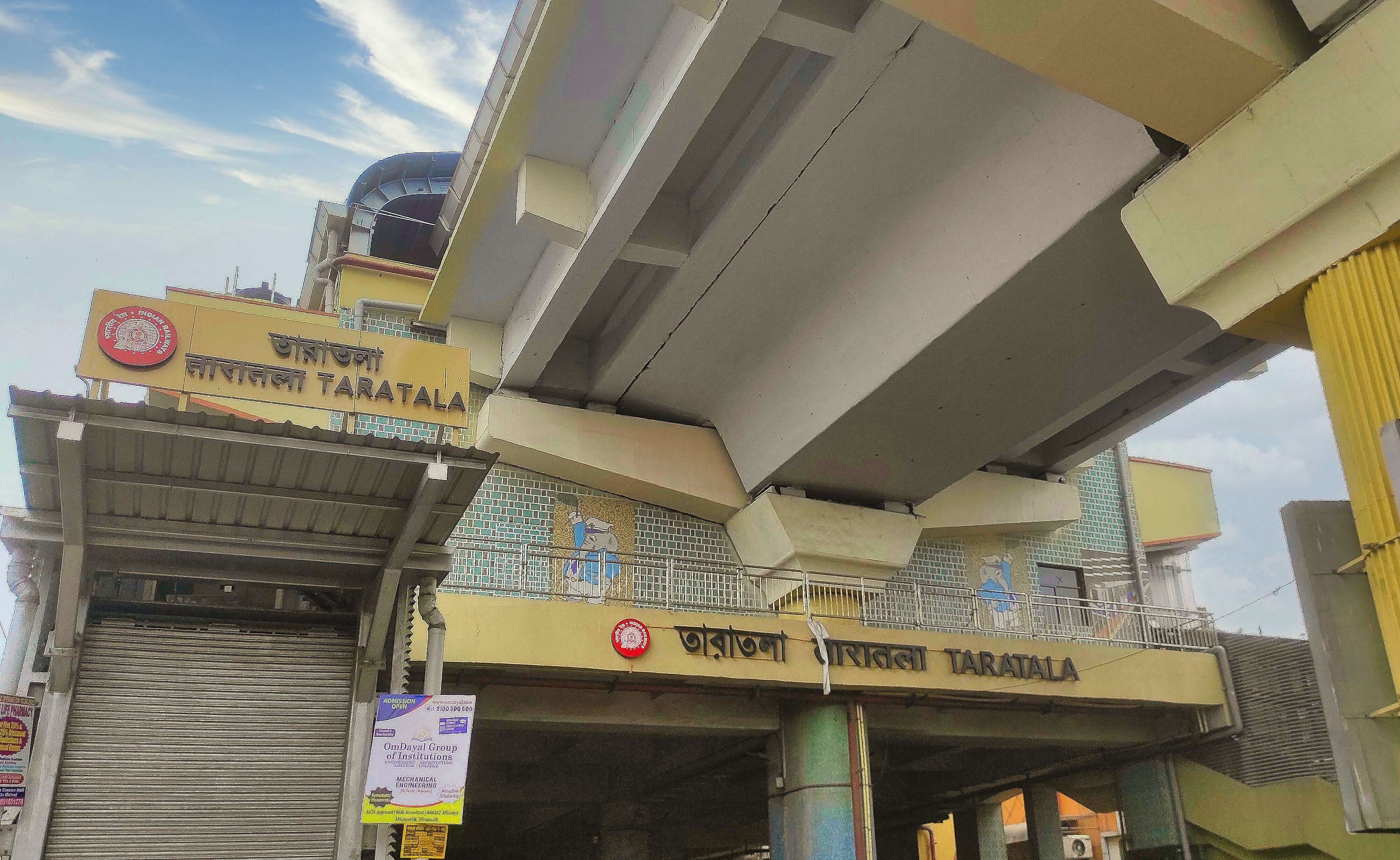

General information
- Location: Diamond Harbour Rd, Naskarpur; Kolkata, West Bengal 700034; India
- Coordinates: 22.50863°N 88.32049°E
- System: Kolkata Metro
- Operator: Metro Railway, Kolkata
- Line: Purple Line
- Platforms: 2 (2 side platforms)
- Tracks: 2

Construction
- Structure type: Elevated
- Parking: No
- Accessible: Yes

Other information
- Status: Operational
- Station code: KTRT

History
- Opened: 30 December 2022; 3 years ago

Services
Preceding station	Kolkata Metro	Following station
Majerhat Terminus	Purple Line	Behala Bazar towards Joka
Route map
Location

Taratala is the elevated northern metro station on the Purple Line of Kolkata Metro which is located in the Taratala area of southern Kolkata, West Bengal, India. This station is named after the locality in which the station is located. The station is elevated above Diamond Harbour Road.

== Location ==
This station is located in Taratala area. The geographical location of the station is 22.4987215°N 88.3146276°E. The previous station of the station is Behala Bazar metro station at a distance of 1.03 km and the next station is Majerhat metro station at a distance of 1.25 km.

== History ==
Purple Line was approved in the railway budget for the financial year 2010-2011 and Rs 2,6519 crore was allocated for the construction work. In October 2011, NVRL won the tender for the construction of the Metro Corridor from Joka to Esplanade along with the Thakurpukur metro station.

Trial runs on the 6.5-km Joka-Taratla stretch of Kolkata Metro's Purple Line began in mid-September 2022, and it received mandatory Commissioner of Railway Safety (CRS) clearance in November.

The Joka–Taratala stretch was inaugurated by Prime Minister Narendra Modi on 30 December 2022 in the presence of West Bengal Chief Minister Mamata Banerjee and Railway Minister Ashwini Vaishnaw. Some students from schools like St Thomas Boys School were granted the rare opportunity to be the first ones to ride in this Joka–Taratala stretch after the inauguration.

After lot of hardships and developmental work, the Taratala-Majerhat section of Purple Line was inaugurated on 7 March 2024.

== Station layout ==
Metro arriving at Taratala Metro Station during the 1st run on the opening day Taratala Metro Station, which belongs to Purple Line of Kolkata Metro, is structurally an elevated metro station. The station has total 3 levels. Station entrances and exits begin or end at the first level or ground level. Second level or L1 or intermediate level houses station fare control, station agents, metro card vending machines, crossovers etc. The third level or L2 or the final level houses the platforms and rail tracks. The station is 200 meters long and 25 meters wide.

The station is being built with state-of-the-art technology. The station has 4 entrances and exits for entry and exit. The second level of the station has ticket collection center, ticket validator for ticket examination. The station will have escalators for the convenience of passengers. It is equipped with several modern amenities, such as escalators, lifts, CCTV cameras, and public address systems, to ensure the safety and convenience of passengers. Besides, the station will have drinking water and toilet facilities.

L2	Side platform, Doors will open on the left
L2	Platform 2	Train towards Joka (Behala Bazar) →
L2	Platform 1	← Train towards Majerhat (terminus)
L2	Side platform, Doors will open on the left
L1	Concourse	Fare control, station agent, Metro QR ticket vending machines, crossover
G	Street level	Exit/Entrance

== Electricity and signal systems ==
Like the other stations and lines of the Kolkata Metro, this station uses 750 volts DC power supply by the third railway to operate the trains.

Train movement is conducted at this station and on the railway by communication-based train control signal system. This signal system can operate a 5 second interval train. Currently this automatic signalling system is not activated and only one metro track is operational.

== Finance ==
Indian Railways has spent Rs 2,477.25 crore to construct six stations and metro rail system on the 6.5 km long Joka-Taratla route including Taratala metro station.

== Connections ==
=== Bus ===
Ajanta Cinema Bus Stop is 170 m (560 ft) to 800 m (2,600 ft) away from the metro Station respectively.

=== Rail ===
Majerhat is 1.4 km (0.87 mi) away from the metro station via NH 12.

=== Air ===
Behala Airport is 4.4 km (2.7 mi) via Behala Flying Club Road and Taratala Road.

== Gallery ==
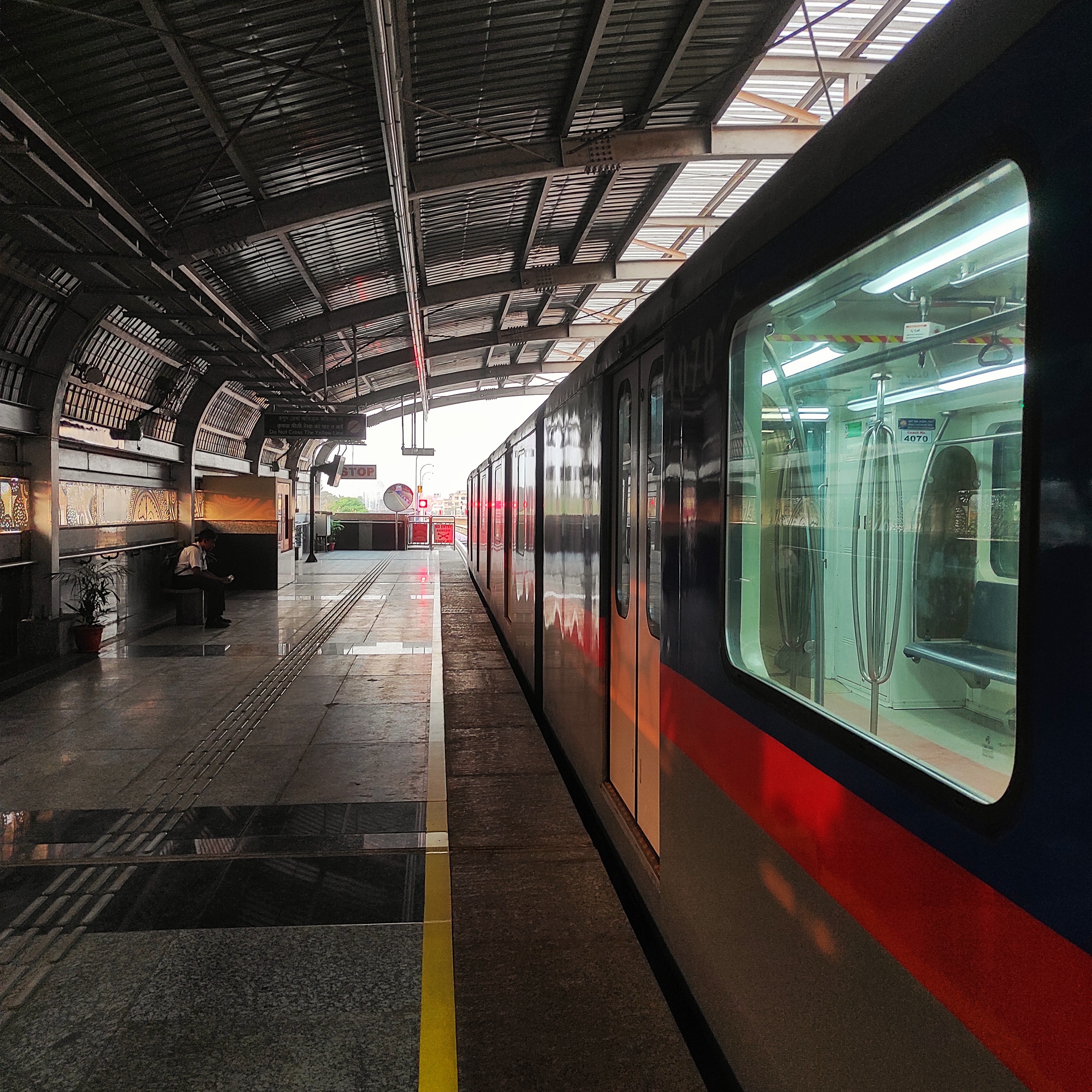
A Joka bound metro is ready to leave

== See also ==
- Media related to Taratala metro station at Wikimedia Commons
- List of Kolkata Metro stations
