= Behala Chowrasta metro station =

Kolkata Metro's Purple Line metro station

Behala Chowrasta
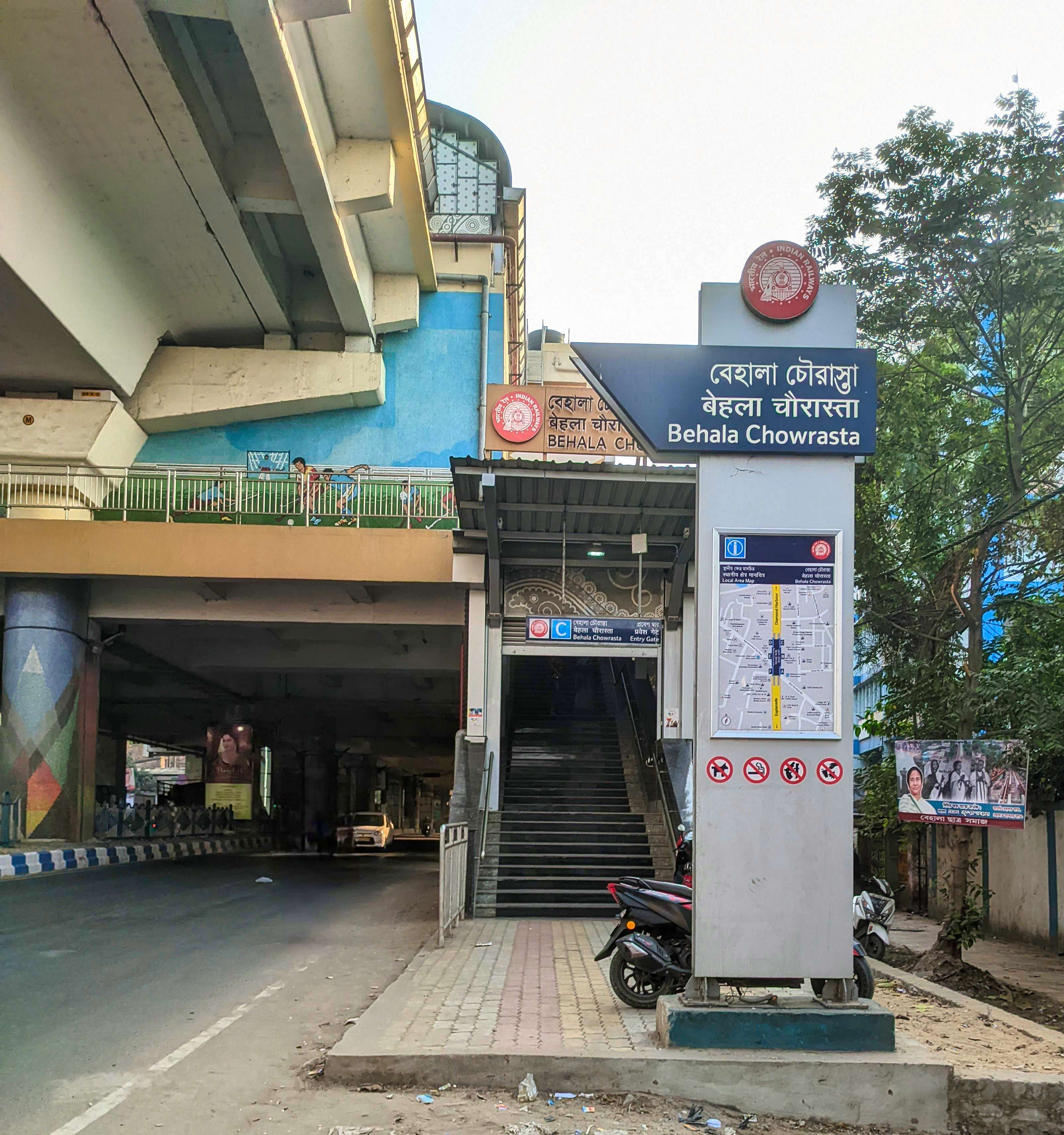
- Behala Chowrasta metro station gate C

General information
- Location: Diamond Harbour Rd, Behala Chowrasta; Kolkata, West Bengal 700008; India
- System: Kolkata Metro
- Operator: Metro Railway, Kolkata
- Line: Purple Line
- Platforms: 2 (2 side platforms)
- Tracks: 2

Construction
- Structure type: Elevated
- Parking: No
- Accessible: Yes

Other information
- Status: Operational
- Station code: KBCR

History
- Opening: 30 December 2022; 3 years ago

Services
Preceding station	Kolkata Metro	Following station
Behala Bazar towards Majerhat	Purple Line	Sakher Bazar towards Joka
Route map
Location

Behala Chowrasta is an elevated metro station on the North-South corridor of the Purple Line of Kolkata Metro in Kolkata, West Bengal, India. It is located exactly above the Behala Chowrasta intersection on Diamond Harbour Road / NH-12. It was opened in the first phase of this line. The station was commissioned on 30 December 2022.

== History ==
Purple Line was approved in the railway budget for the financial year 2010-2011 and Rs 2,6519 crore was allocated for the construction work. In October 2011, NVRL won the tender for the construction of the Metro Corridor from Joka Metro Station to Esplanade Metro Station along with the Thakurpukur metro station.

Trial runs on the 6.5-km Joka-Taratala stretch of Kolkata Metro's Purple Line began in mid-September 2022, and it received mandatory Commissioner of Railway Safety (CRS) clearance in November.

The Joka–Taratala stretch was inaugurated by Prime Minister Narendra Modi on 30 December 2022 in the presence of West Bengal Chief Minister Mamata Banerjee and Railway Minister Ashwini Vaishnaw. Some students from schools like St Thomas Boys School were granted the rare opportunity to be the first ones to ride in this Joka–Taratala stretch after the inauguration.

== Station layout ==
L2	Side platform, Doors will open on the left
L2	Platform 2	Train towards Joka (Sakher Bazar) →
L2	Platform 1	← Train towards Majerhat (Behala Bazar)
L2	Side platform, Doors will open on the left
L1	Concourse	Fare control, station agent, Metro QR ticket vending machines, crossover
G	Street level	Exit/Entrance

=== Electricity and signal systems ===
Like the other stations and lines of the Kolkata Metro, this station will use 750 volts DC power supply by the third railway to operate the trains.

Train movement will be conducted at this station and on the railway by communication-based train control signal system. This signal system can operate a 5 second interval train.

== Gallery ==
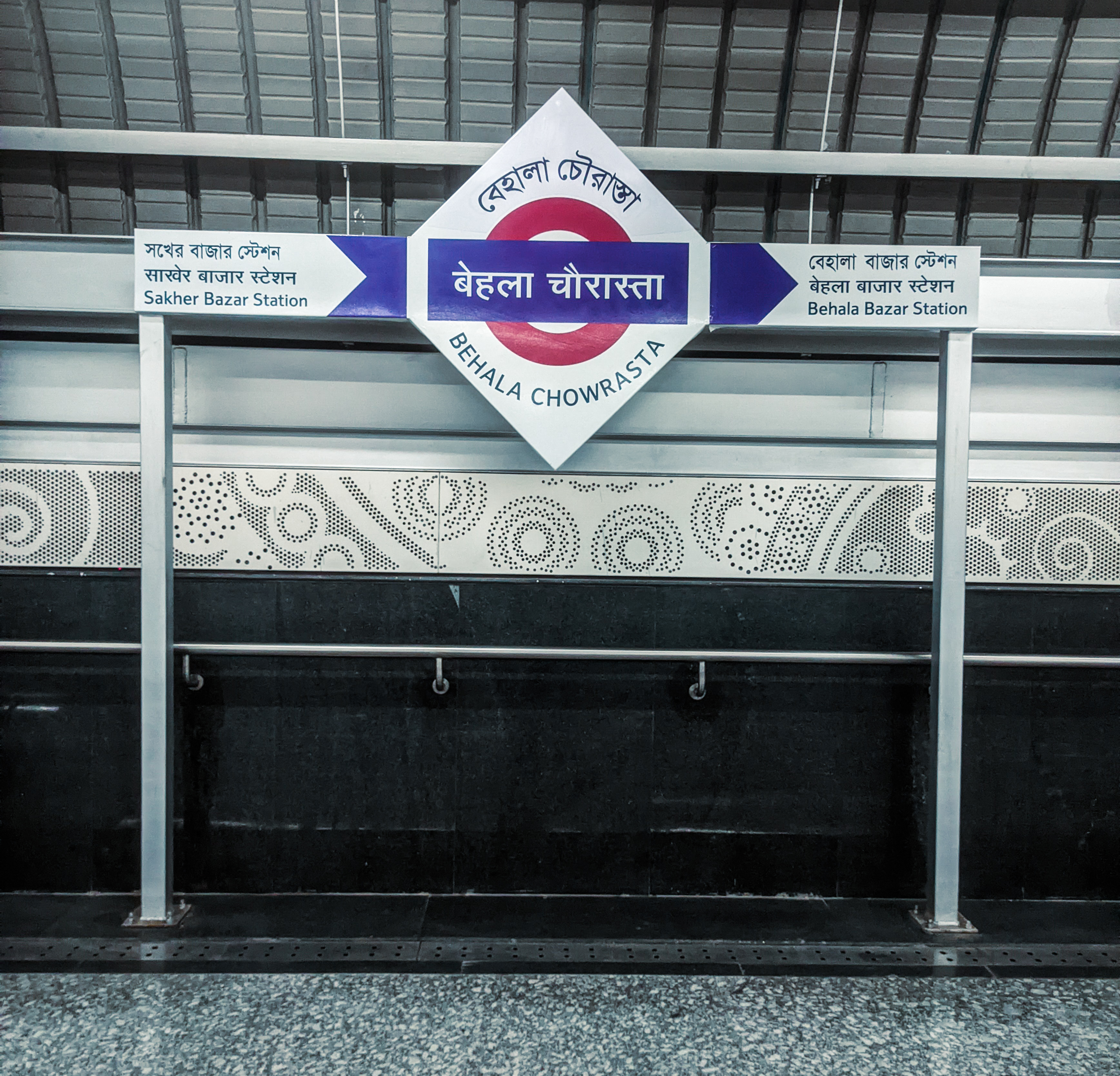
Behala Chowrasta metro station signage

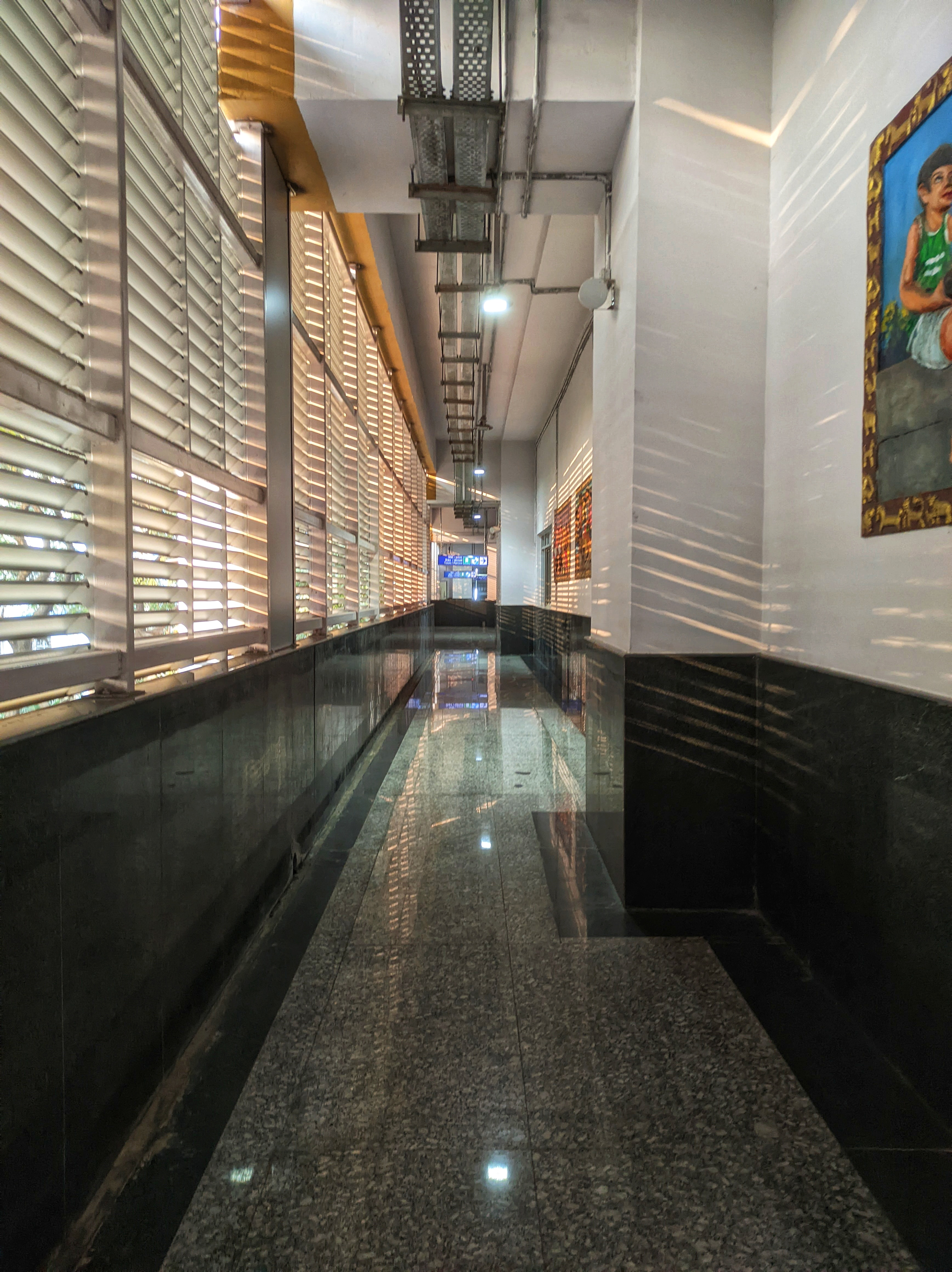
Behala Chowrasta metro station concourse

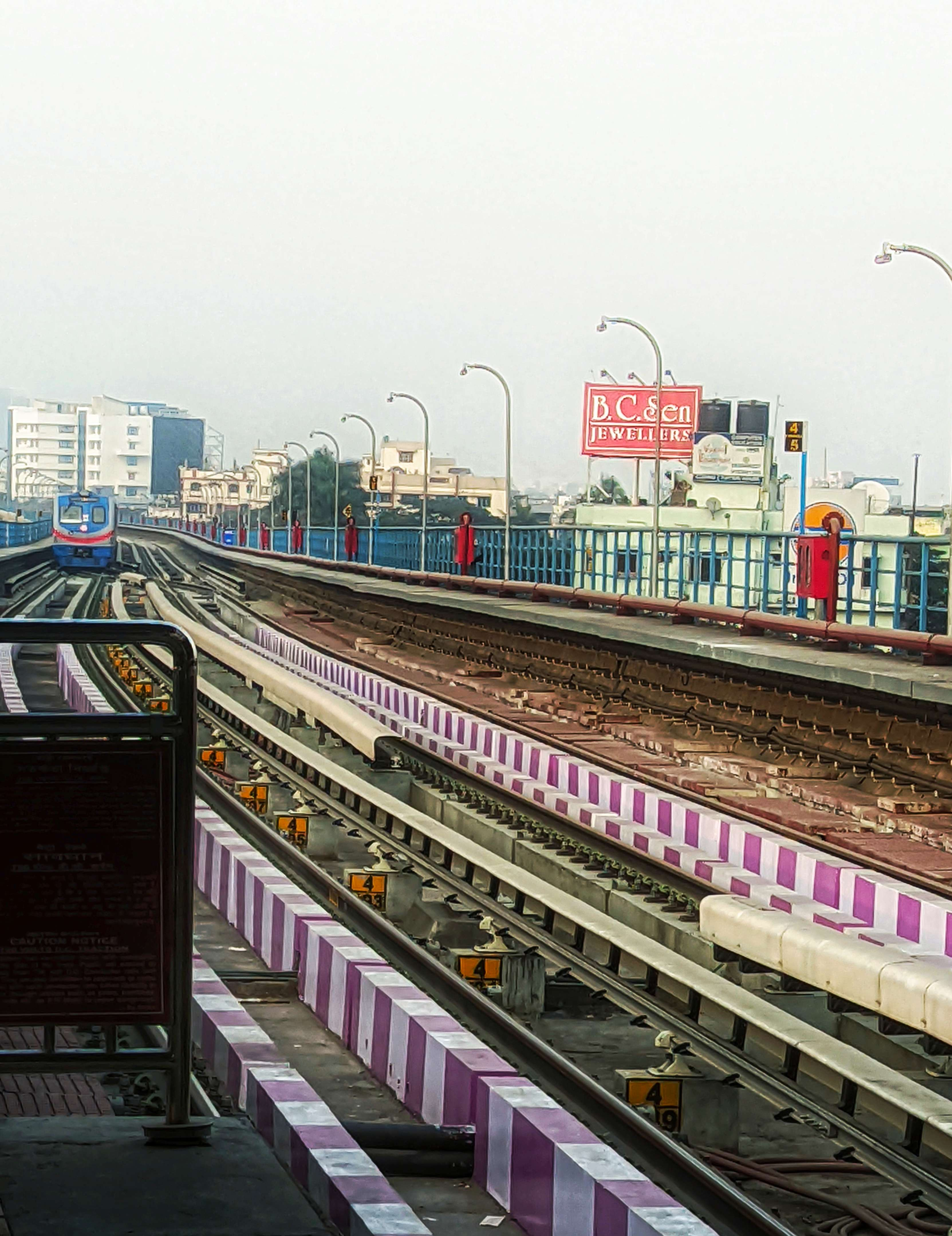
A Joka bound metro approaching to platform 1

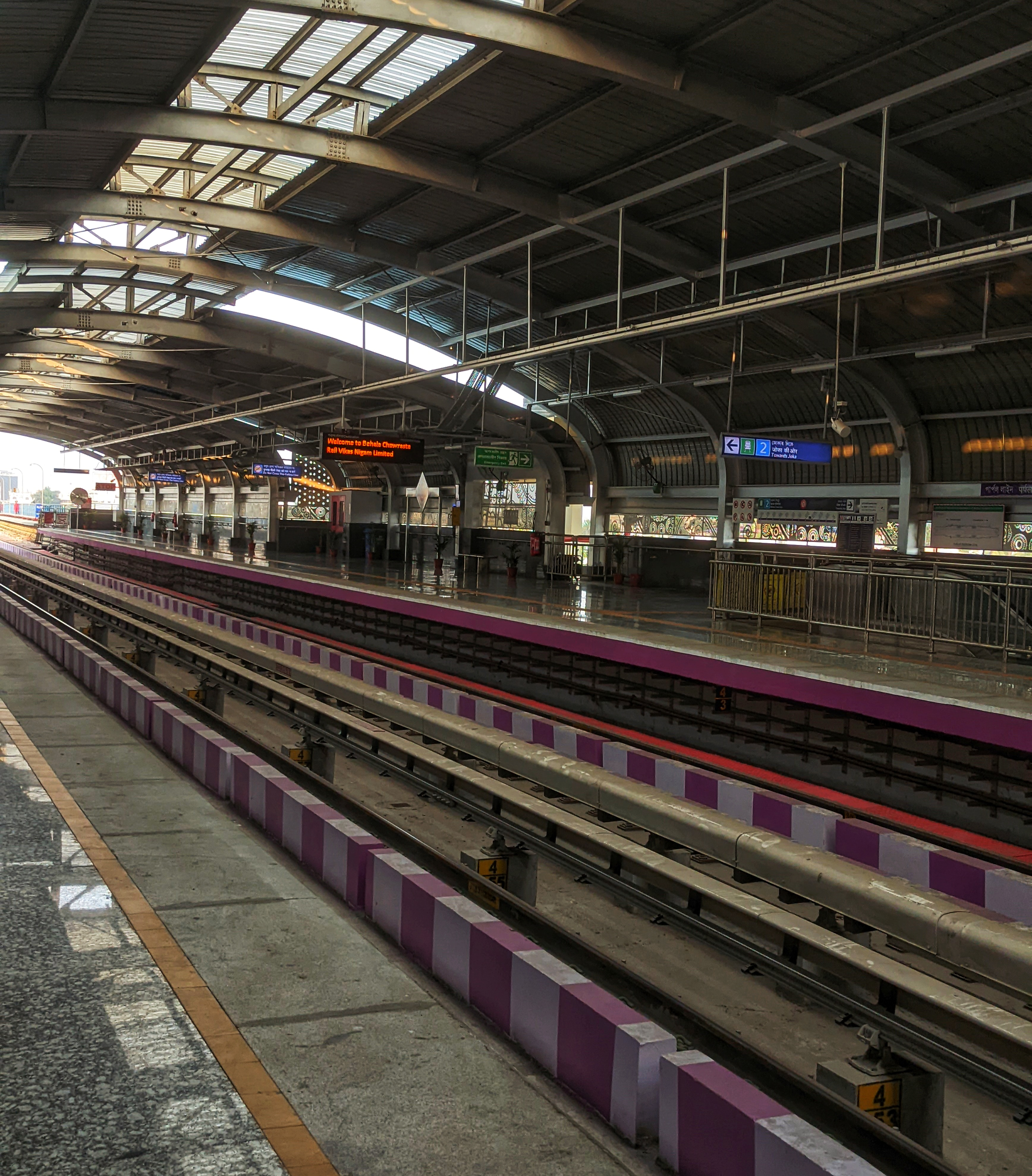
Behala Chowrasta metro station platforms

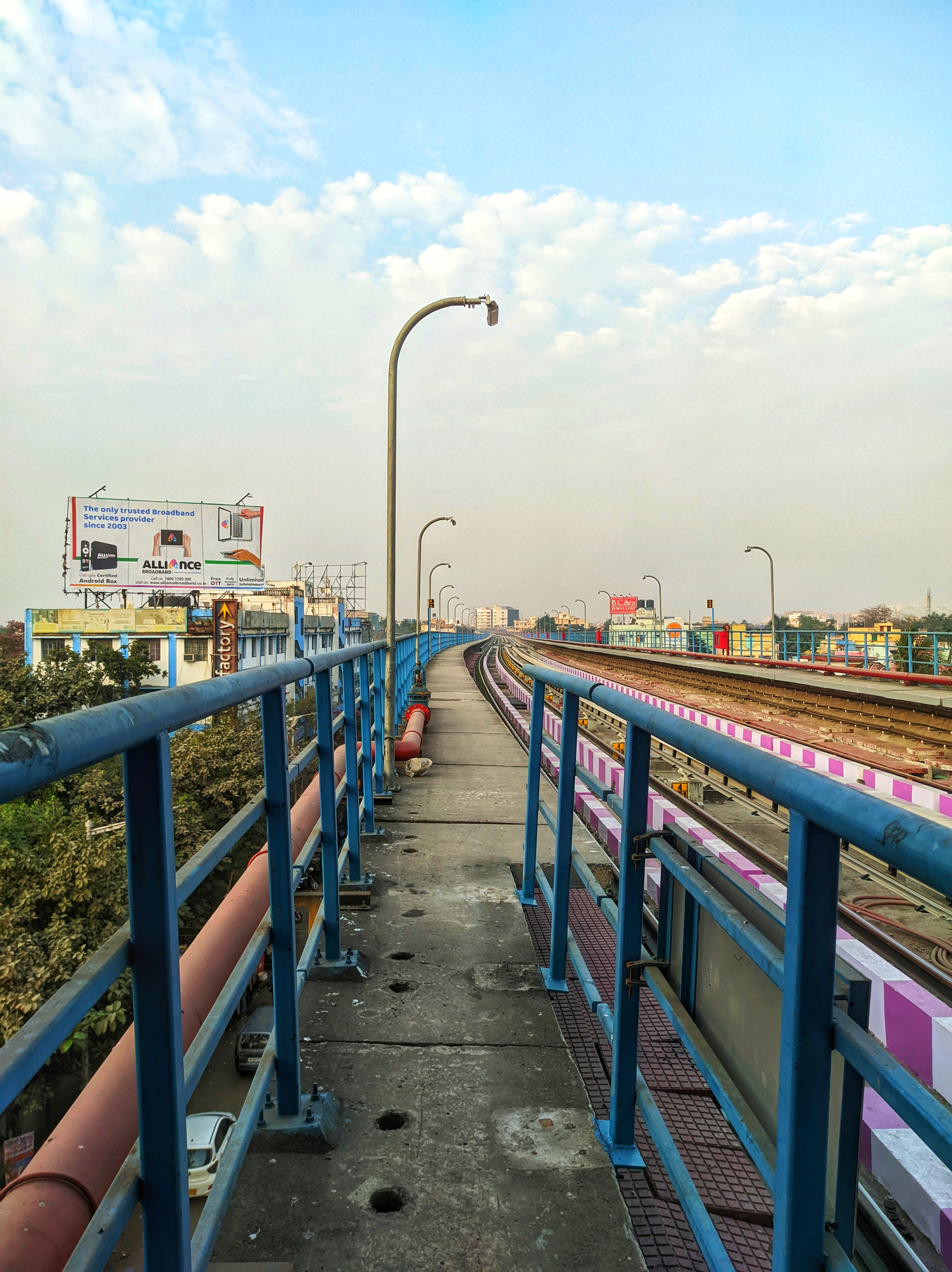
Outer view of the Behala Chowrasta metro station

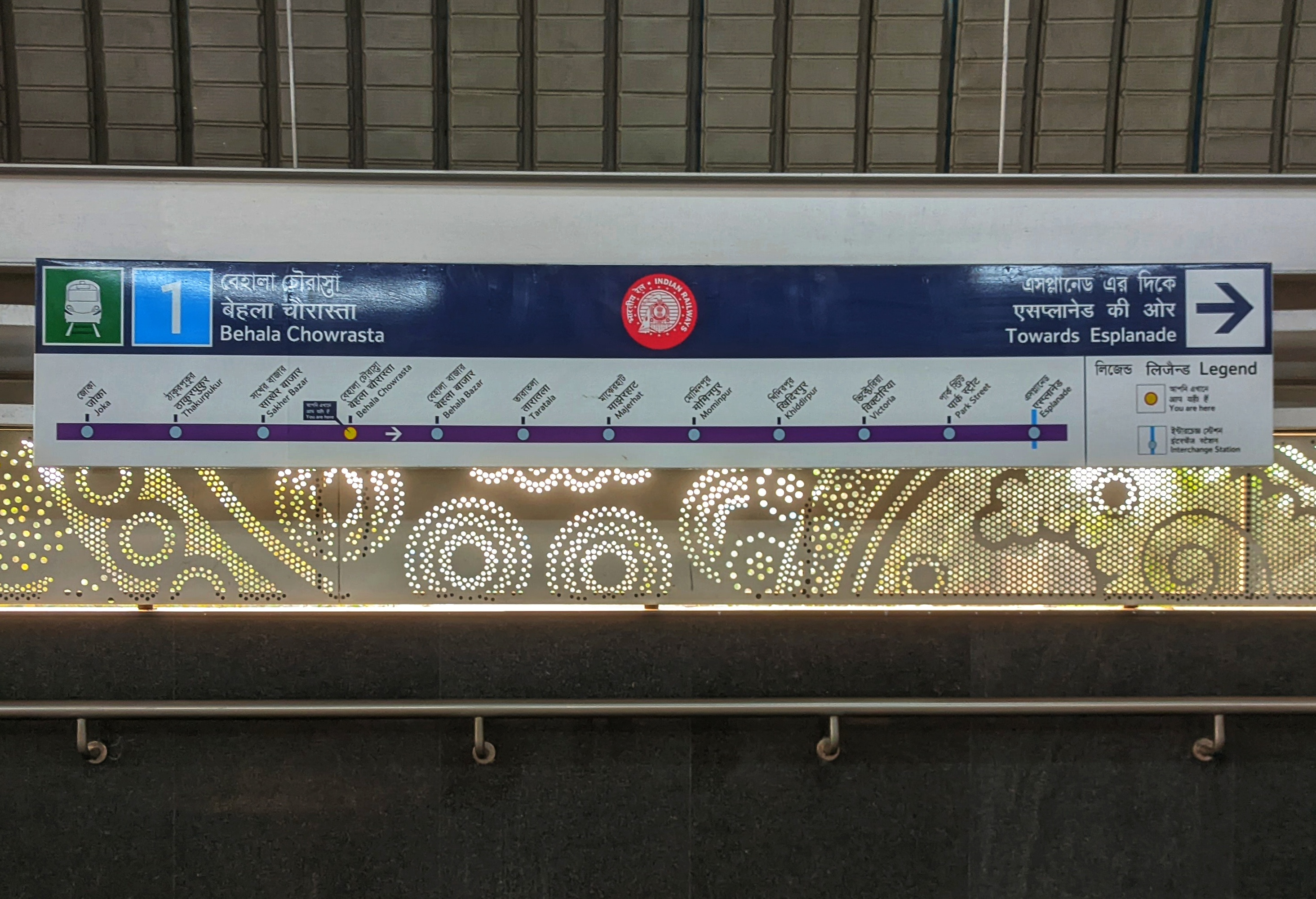
Purple line's route map at the Behala Chowrasta metro station

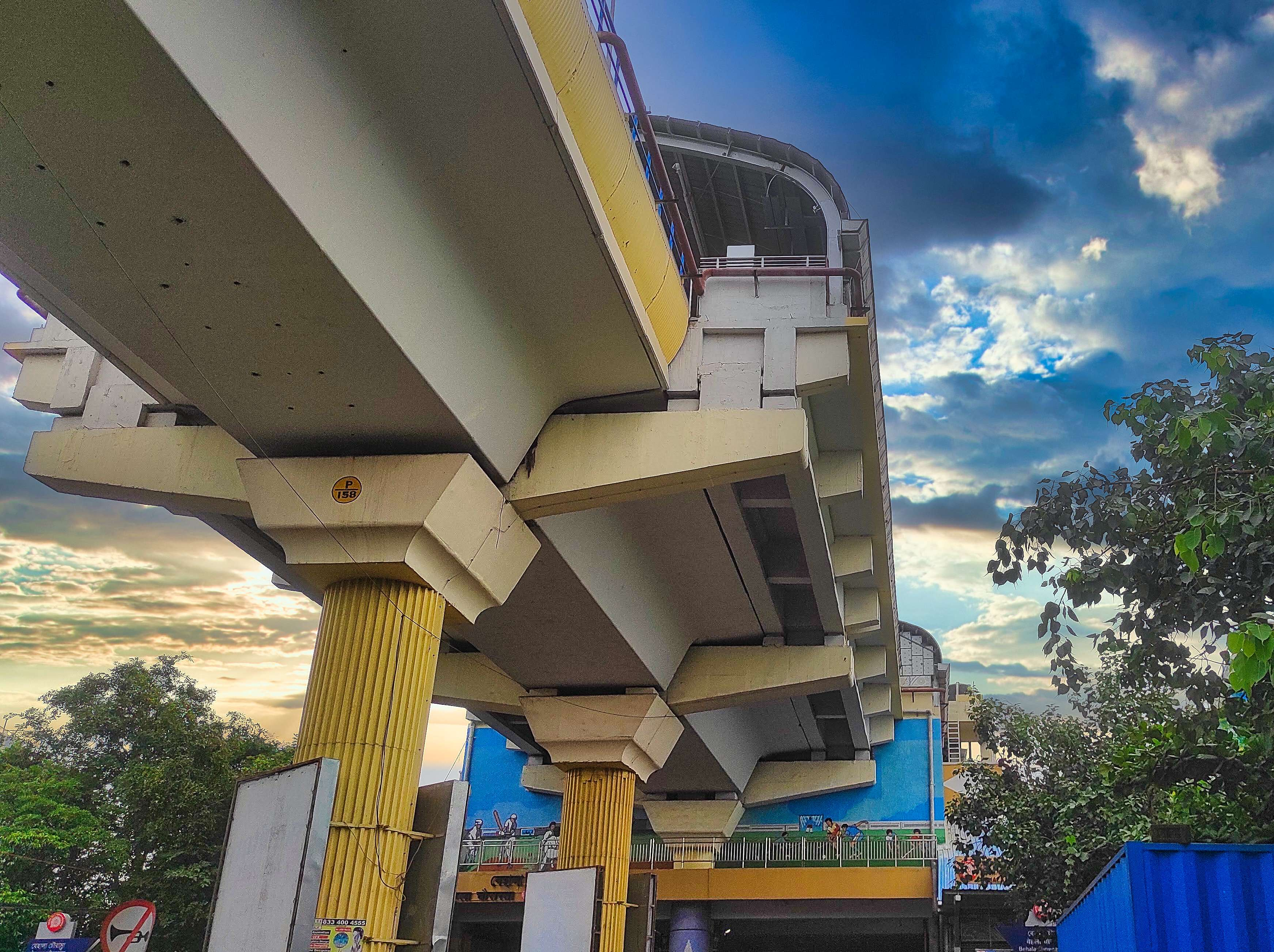
Behala Chowratsa metro station outside view from the street level

Outer view of Behala Chowrasta metro station towards Joka from a metro
