= Behala Bazar metro station =

Kolkata Metro's Purple Line metro station

Behala Bazar
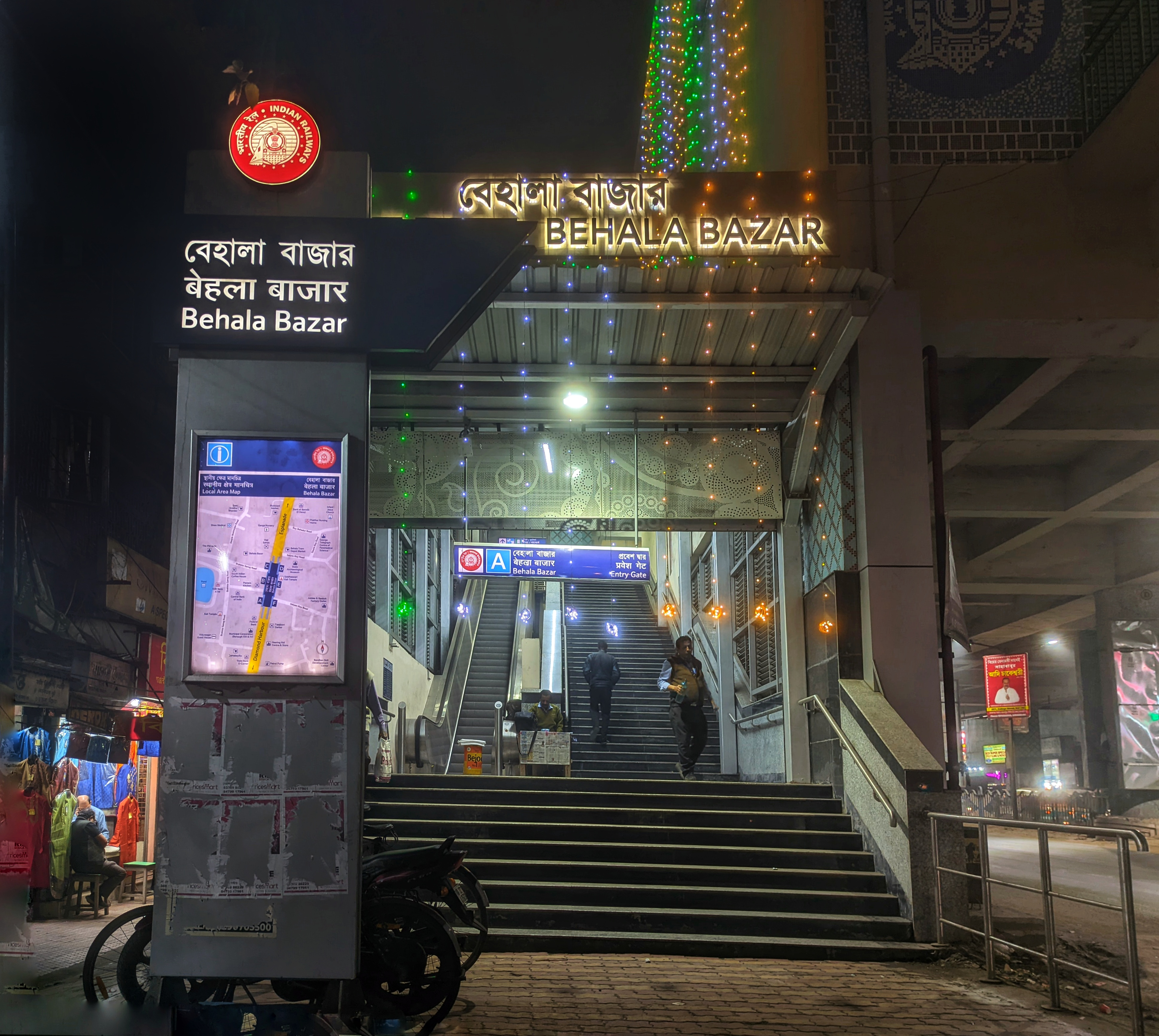
- Entry gate A of metro station

General information
- Location: Diamond Harbour Rd, Behala Bazar; Kolkata, West Bengal 700034; India
- Coordinates: 22.49892°N 88.31735°E
- System: Kolkata Metro
- Operator: Metro Railway, Kolkata
- Line: Purple Line
- Platforms: 2 (2 side platforms)
- Tracks: 2

Construction
- Structure type: Elevated
- Parking: No
- Accessible: Yes

Other information
- Status: Operational
- Station code: KBBR

History
- Opening: 30 December 2022; 3 years ago

Services
Preceding station	Kolkata Metro	Following station
Taratala towards Majerhat	Purple Line	Behala Chowrasta towards Joka
Route map
Location

Behala Bazar is an elevated metro station on the North-South corridor of the Purple Line of Kolkata Metro which is located in Behala Bazar, Kolkata, West Bengal, India. This station was commissioned on 30 December 2022.

== History ==
Purple Line was approved in the railway budget for the financial year 2010-2011 and Rs 2,6519 crore was allocated for the construction work. In October 2011, NVRL won the tender for the construction of the Metro Corridor from Joka Metro Station to Esplanade Metro Station along with the Thakurpukur metro station.

Trial runs on the 6.5-km Joka-Taratla stretch of Kolkata Metro's Purple Line began in mid-September 2022, and it received mandatory Commissioner of Railway Safety (CRS) clearance in November.

The Joka–Taratala stretch was inaugurated by Prime Minister Narendra Modi on 30 December 2022 in the presence of West Bengal Chief Minister Mamata Banerjee and Railway Minister Ashwini Vaishnaw. Some students from schools like St Thomas Boys School were granted the rare opportunity to be the first ones to ride in this Joka–Taratala stretch after the inauguration.

== Station layout ==
L2	Side platform, Doors will open on the left
L2	Platform 2	Train towards Joka (Behala Chowrasta) →
L2	Platform 1	← Train towards Majerhat (Taratala)
L2	Side platform, Doors will open on the left
L1	Concourse	Fare control, station agent, Metro QR ticket vending machines, crossover
G	Street level	Exit/Entrance

== Finance ==
Indian Railways has spent Rs 2,477.25 crore to construct six stations and metro rail system on the 6.5 km long Joka-Taratla route including Behala Bazar.

== Gallery ==
A Joka-bound metro is entering platform no, 1 of Behala Bazar metro station
