= Sakher Bazar metro station =

Kolkata Metro's Purple Line metro station

Sakher Bazar
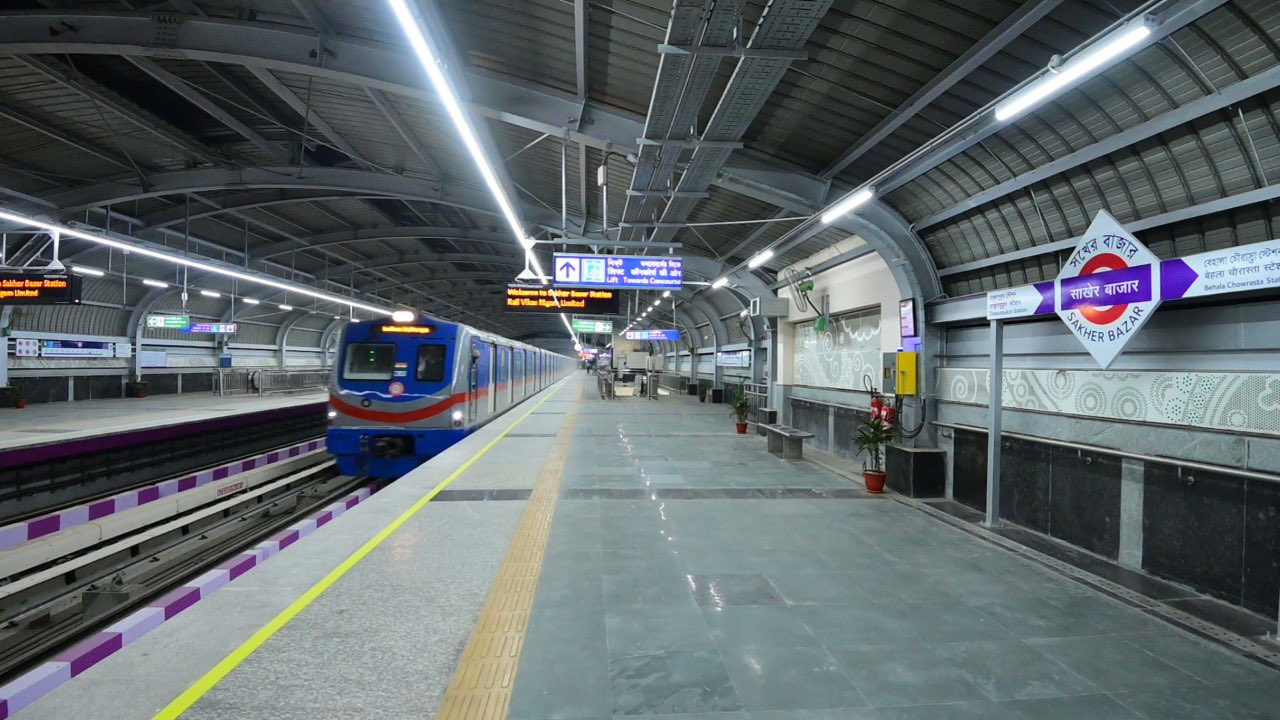
- An ICF Medha rake arriving at the metro station

General information
- Location: Diamond Harbour Rd, Purba Barisha; Kolkata, West Bengal 700008; India
- Coordinates: 22.47461°N 88.30999°E
- System: Kolkata Metro
- Operator: Metro Railway, Kolkata
- Line: Purple Line
- Platforms: 2 (2 side platforms)
- Tracks: 2

Construction
- Structure type: Elevated
- Parking: No
- Accessible: Yes

Other information
- Status: Operational
- Station code: KSKB

History
- Opened: 30 December 2022; 3 years ago

Services
| Preceding station | Kolkata Metro | Following station |
|---|---|---|
| Behala Chowrasta towards Majerhat | Purple Line | Thakurpukur towards Joka |
Route map
Location

Sakher Bazar is an elevated metro station on the North-South corridor of the Purple Line of Kolkata Metro in Kolkata, West Bengal, India. It was opened in the first phase of this line. The station was commissioned on 30 December 2022.

== History ==
Purple Line was approved in the railway budget for the financial year 2010-2011 and Rs 2,6519 crore was allocated for the construction work. In October 2011, RVNL won the tender for the construction of the Metro Corridor from Joka Metro Station to Esplanade Metro Station along with the Thakurpukur metro station.

Trial runs on the 6.5-km Joka-Taratla stretch of Kolkata Metro's Purple Line began in mid-September 2022, and it received mandatory Commissioner of Railway Safety (CRS) clearance in November.

The Joka–Taratala stretch was inaugurated by Prime Minister Narendra Modi on 30 December 2022 in the presence of West Bengal Chief Minister Mamata Banerjee and Railway Minister Ashwini Vaishnaw. Some students from schools like St Thomas Boys School were granted the rare opportunity to be the first ones to ride in this Joka–Taratala stretch after the inauguration.

== Station layout ==
| L2 | Side platform, Doors will open on the left |
| L2 | Platform 2 | Train towards Joka (Thakurpukur) → |
| L2 | Platform 1 | ← Train towards Majerhat (Behala Chowrasta) |
| L2 | Side platform, Doors will open on the left |
| L1 | Concourse | Fare control, station agent, Metro QR ticket vending machines, crossover |
| G | Street level | Exit/Entrance |

== Connections ==
=== Buses ===
Thakurpukur bus stop is conveniently located under the station.

== Gallery ==
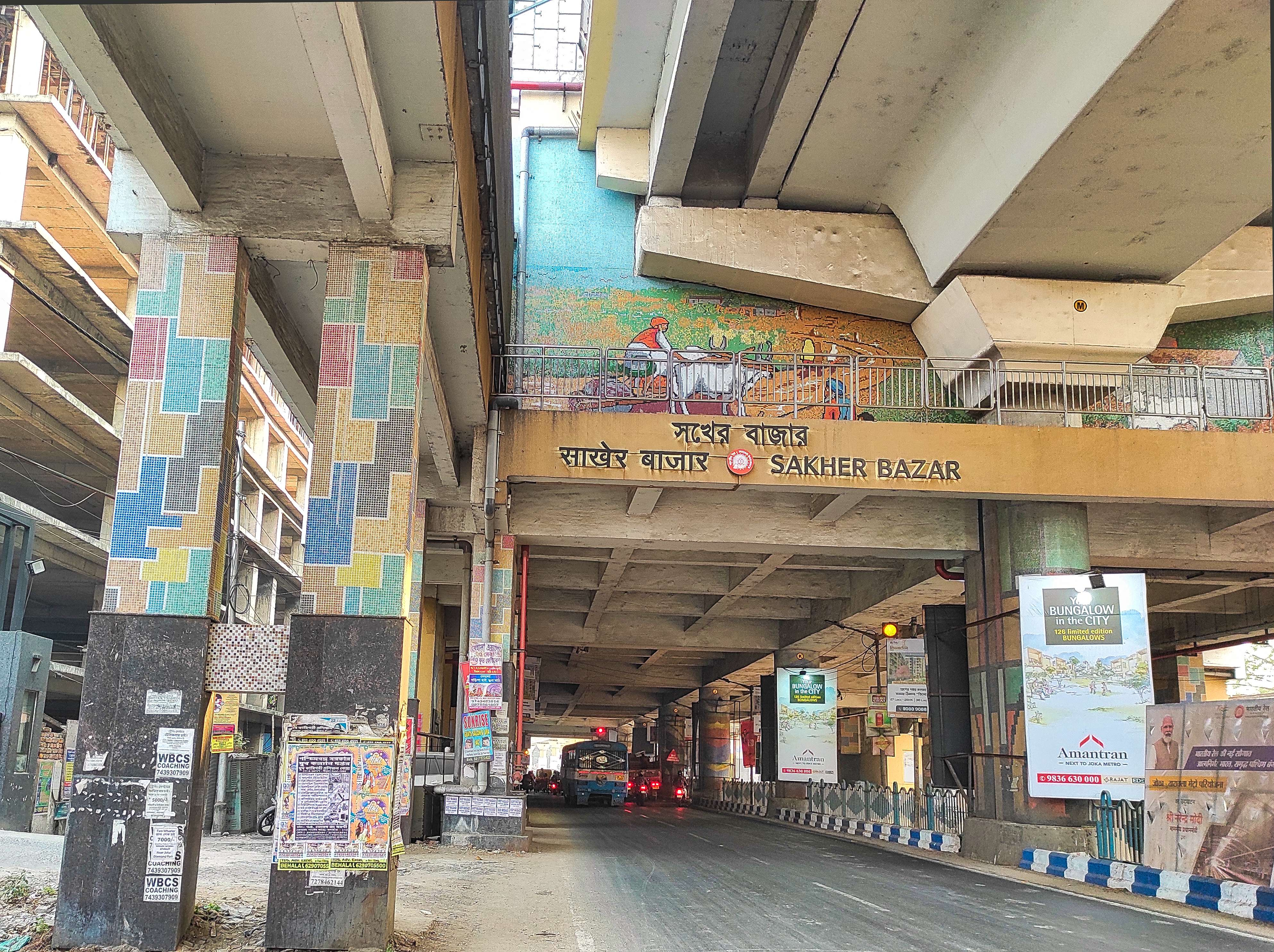
Sakherbazar metro station complex

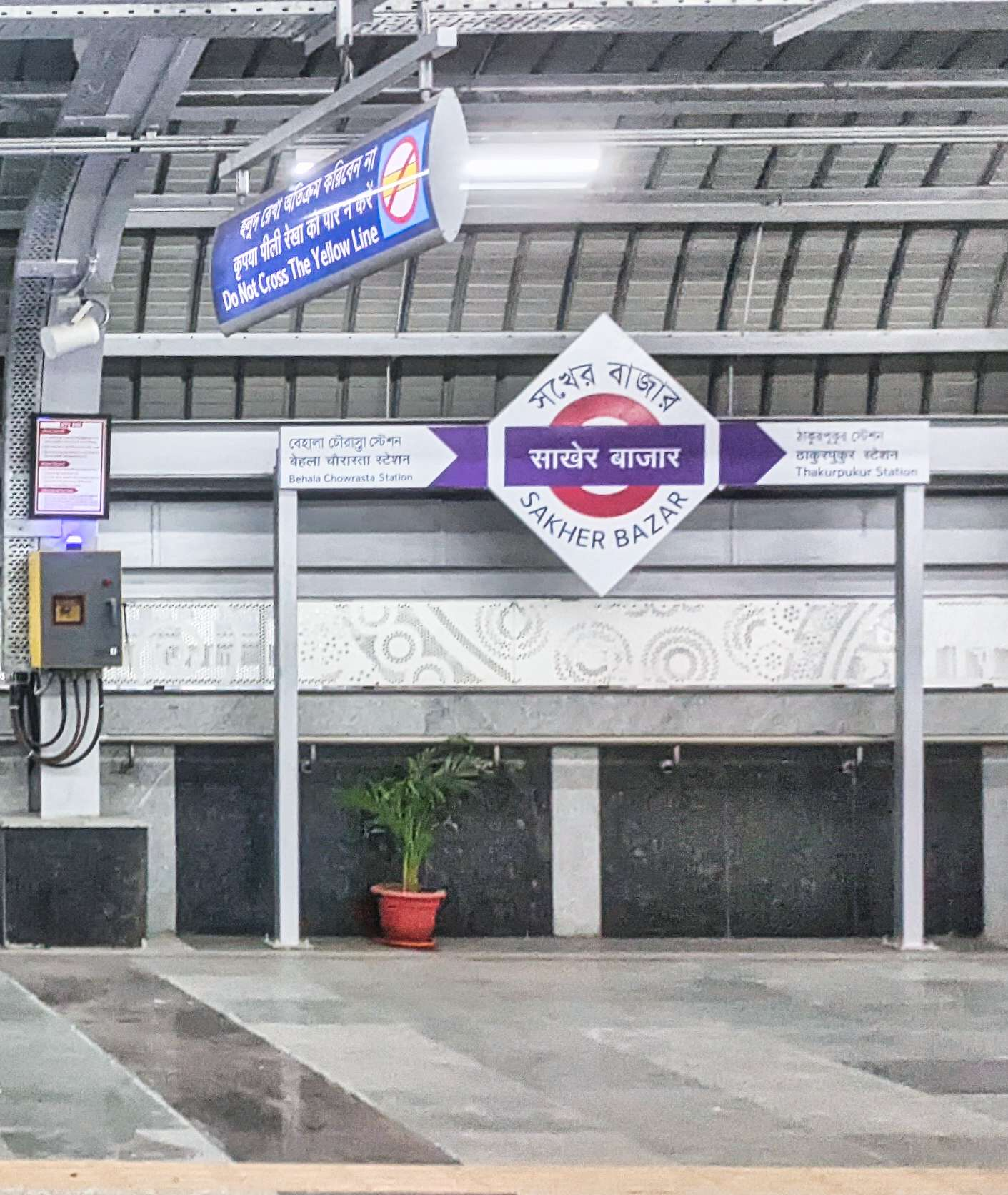
Sakherbazar metro station signage
