= Thakurpukur metro station =

Kolkata Metro's Purple Line metro station

Thakurpukur
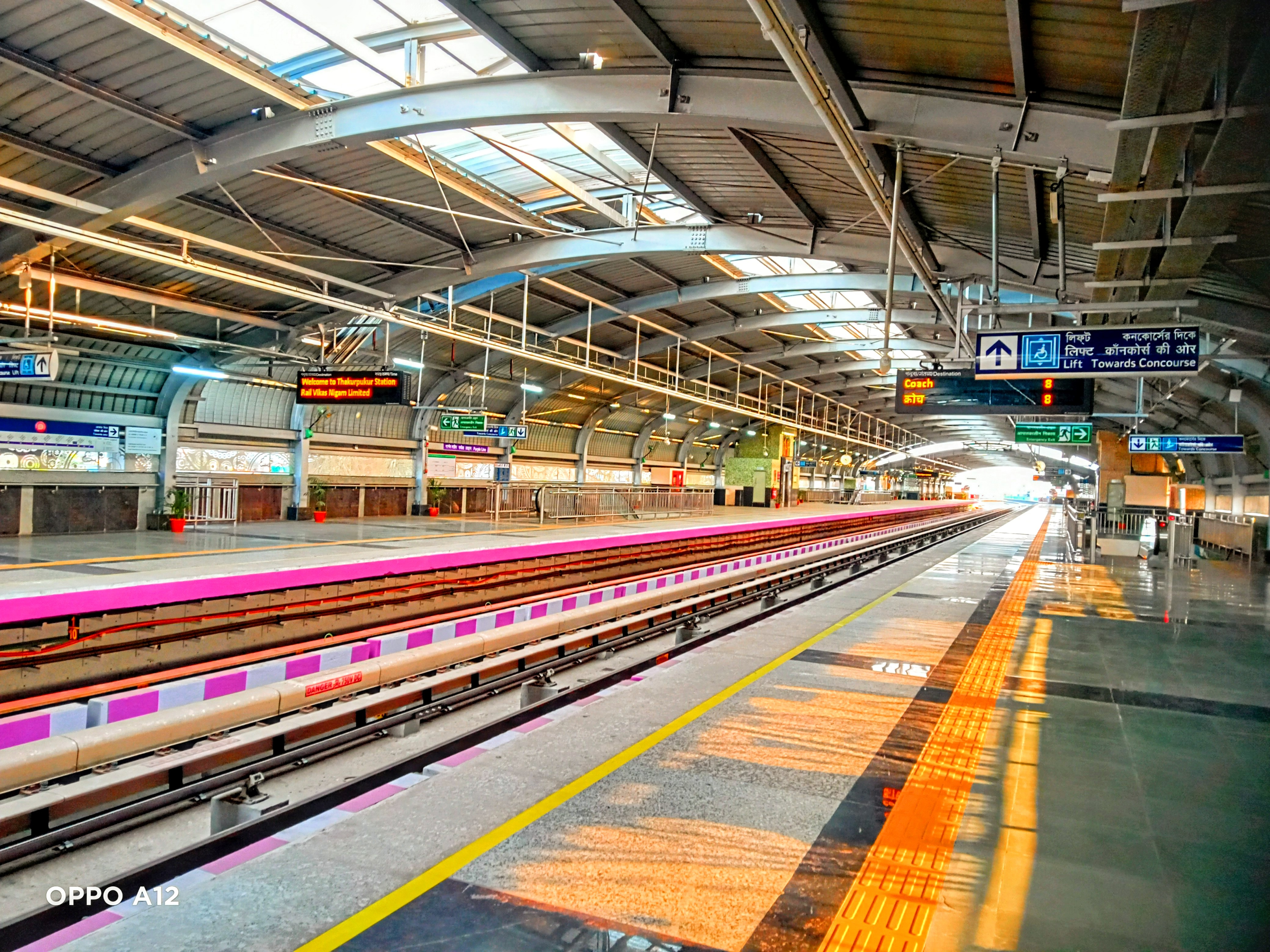
- Platform level of the station

General information
- Location: Diamond Harbour Rd, Thakurpukur; Kolkata, West Bengal 700063; India
- Coordinates: 22.46426°N 88.30755°E
- System: Kolkata Metro
- Operator: Metro Railway, Kolkata
- Line: Purple Line
- Platforms: 2 (2 side platforms)

Construction
- Structure type: Elevated
- Parking: Yes

Other information
- Status: Operational
- Station code: KTKP

History
- Opened: 30 December 2022; 3 years ago

Services
Preceding station	Kolkata Metro	Following station
Sakher Bazar towards Majerhat	Purple Line	Joka Terminus
Route map
Location

Thakurpukur is an elevated metro station on the North-South corridor of the Purple Line of Kolkata Metro in Thakurpukur, Kolkata, West Bengal, India. It is located in Thakurpukur, above the Diamond Harbour road. The station was commissioned on 30 December 2022.

== History ==
Purple Line was approved in the railway budget for the financial year 2010–2011 and Rs 2,6519 crore was allocated for the construction work. In October 2011, NVRL won the tender for the construction of the Metro Corridor from Joka Metro Station to Esplanade Metro Station along with the Thakurpukur metro station.

Trial runs on the 6.5-km Joka-Taratla stretch of Kolkata Metro's Purple Line began in mid-September 2022, and it received mandatory Commissioner of Railway Safety (CRS) clearance in November.

The Joka–Taratala stretch was inaugurated by Prime Minister Narendra Modi on 30 December 2022 in the presence of West Bengal Chief Minister Mamata Banerjee and Railway Minister Ashwini Vaishnaw. Some students from schools like St Thomas Boys School were granted the opportunity to be the first ones to ride in this Joka–Taratala stretch after the inauguration.

== Station layout ==
L2	Side platform, Doors will open on the left
L2	Platform 2	Train towards Joka (terminus) →
L2	Platform 1	← Train towards Majerhat (Sakher Bazar)
L2	Side platform, Doors will open on the left
L1	Concourse	Fare control, station agent, Metro QR ticket vending machines, crossover
G	Street level	Exit/Entrance

== Connections ==
=== Bus ===
Bus route number 12C, 12C/1A, 12C/1B, 40B, 75 (Babughat to Raypur), 83, 210, 235, SD4, SD5, SD8, SD9, SD14, SD16, SD18, SD19, SD22/1, SD26, SD27, SD76, 11A (Mini), S119 (Mini), S131 (Mini), C8, C37, C38, M16A, S3A, S3W, S12D, S16, AC4B, AC12D, AC52, VS6 etc. serve the station.
