= KJKA =

KJKA may refer to:

- KJKA, the ICAO airport code for Jack Edwards Airport, Baldwin Country, Alabama, United States
- KJKA, the Kolkata Metro station code for Joka metro station, West Bengal, India
