= Sakhr =

Sakhr or Sakher (Arabic: ﺻﺨﺮ 'rock' or 'boulder') may refer to:

== People ==
=== Tribes ===
- Bani Sakhr, a Bedouin tribe in Jordan

=== People with the name ===
- Abu Sufyan ibn Harb (Sakhr ibn Harb ibn Umayya ibn Abd Shams, c. 565 — c. 653), leader of the Quraysh tribe of Mecca
- Sakher El Materi (born 1981), Tunisian businessman
- Sakher Habash (1939-2009), founding leader of Fatah
- Sakher Hattar (born 1963), Jordanian oud player
- Sakhr Abu l-Barakat (died 1221/1222), shaikh of the ‘Adawiyya Sufi order

== Other uses ==
- MSX Sakhr AX150, a 1980s home computer
- Sakhr Software Company, an Arabic language technology company in Kuwait
- Sakher Bazar metro station, Kolkata, India

== See also ==
- Shakir, a name
- Sakhir, an area of Bahrain
- Şakir, a Turkish name
- Saqr (disambiguation) and Sakr
