= Saqr =

Saqr (Arabic: صقر 'hawk') or Sakr is an Arabic given name and surname. Notable people with the name include:

== Given name ==
=== Saqr ===
- Saqr Geroushi, Libyan military officer
- Saqr Ghobash (born 1952), Emirati politician
- Saqr bin Mohammad Al Qasimi (1920–2010), Emîr, ruler of Ras Al Khaimah
- Saqr bin Muhammed bin Saqr Al-Qasimi (died 2007), member of the royal Al-Qasimi family
- Saqr bin Sultan Al Qasimi (1924–1993), Emir, ruler of Sharjah (1951 to 1965)
- Saqr bin Zayed Al Nahyan (1887–1928), third ruler of Abu Dhabi

=== as bin Saqr ===
- Ahmed bin Saqr al-Qassimi, Chairman of the Ras Al Khaimah Department of Customs and Seaports
- Khalid bin Saqr Al Qasimi (born 1940), former Crown Prince and deputy ruler of Ras al-Khaimah
- Sultan bin Saqr Al Qasimi (1781–1866), Sheikh of the Qawasim

=== as bint Saqr ===
- Asmaa bint Saqr Al Qasimi, Emirati poet

== Surname ==
=== Sakr ===
- Antoine Sakr, Lebanese footballer
- Abd El-Karim Sakr (1918–1994), Egyptian football player
- Habib Abou Sakr, Lebanese Maronite academic
- Joseph Sakr (1939–1997), Lebanese folkloric and pop singer and stage actor
- Karol Sakr (born 1969), Lebanese singer
- Laila Shereen Sakr (born 1971), known by her moniker VJ Um Amel, Egyptian–American digital media theorist and artist
- Naomi Sakr, British professor, author and public speaker
- Okab Sakr (born 1975), Lebanese journalist and politician
- Pascale Sakr (born 1964), Lebanese singer
- Yasser Sakr (born 1977), amateur Egyptian Greco-Roman wrestler

=== Saqr ===
- Abdel Mageed Saqr (born 1955), Egyptian minister of defense
- Ahmed Al Saqr (born 1970), Lebanese football player
- Etienne Saqr (born 1937), far-right, Lebanese nationalist leader
- Ihab Saqr, believed to have coordinated the 1995 bombing of the Egyptian embassy in Islamabad
- Mohamed Saqr (born 1981), Qatari football player
- Muhammad Jamal Saqr (born 1966), Egyptian writer, academic and poet

== See also ==
- Saqr (disambiguation)
- Sakhr (disambiguation)
- Sakir
