= Saqr (disambiguation) =

Saqr (Arabic: صقر 'falcon') or Sakr is an Arabic given name and surname.

Saqr and Sakr may also refer to:

- Banu Saqr, a Bedouin tribe in northern Palestine
- Al-Saqr SC, a Yemeni sport and cultural club based in Taiz, Yemen
- Al Saqr, a minesweeper of South Yemen, formerly HMS Bodenham (M2609)
- Saqr (drone), a Saudi Arabian unmanned aerial vehicle
- Camp Al-Saqr, a former United States military operating base in Iraq
- Al Saqr Field Airport, a private airfield near Ras al-Khaimah, UAE
- Sakr, an Egyptian tug, formerly Empire Warlock

== See also ==
- Shakir, a name
- Sakhir, an area of Bahrain
- Şakir, a Turkish name
- Sakhr (disambiguation)
