= Taratala =

- Neighbourhood in Kolkata (Calcutta)
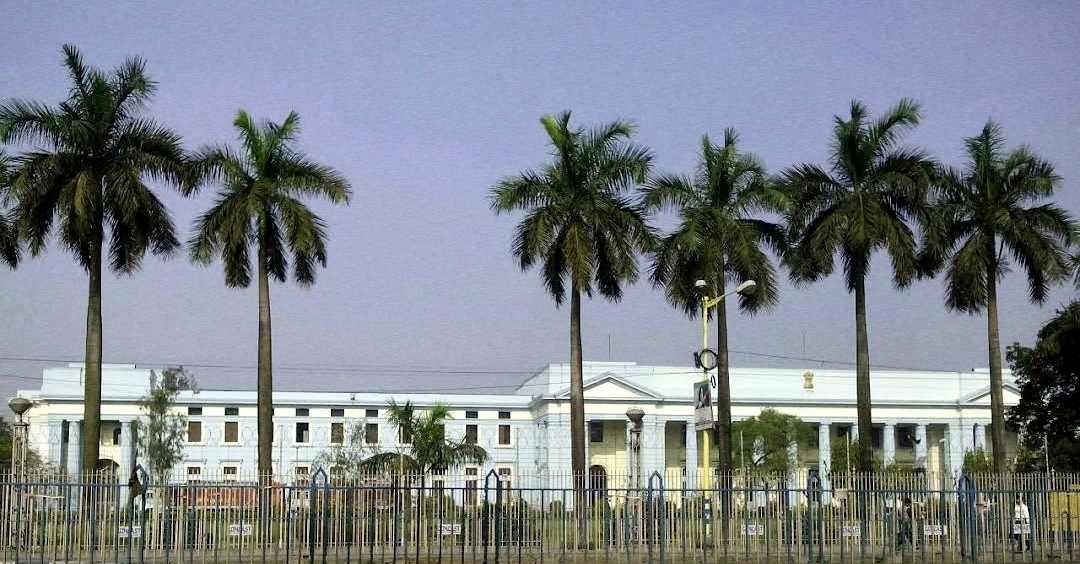
- India Government Mint

- Location in Kolkata
- Coordinates: 22.514132°N 88.315267°E
- Country: India
- State: West Bengal
- City: Kolkata
- District: Kolkata
- Metro Station: Taratala and Majerhat
- Municipal corporation: Kolkata Municipal Corporation
- KMC ward: 80
- Time zone: UTC+5:30 (IST)
- Area code: +91 33
- Lok Sabha constituency: Kolkata Dakshin
- Vidhan Sabha constituency: Kolkata Port

Taratala is a neighbourhood of South Kolkata in Kolkata district in the Indian state of West Bengal. It is one of the important junctions in South Kolkata.

== Geography ==
Taratala is situated at the southern part of Kolkata, surrounded by Garden Reach (west and north-west), Behala (south and south-east), Mominpur and Majherhat (north) and New Alipore (east).

=== Police district ===
Taratala police station is part of the South West division of Kolkata Police. Located at 63, Taratala Road, Kolkata-700088, it has jurisdiction over the police district which is bordered on the north along the southern fencing of old Budge Budge Railway line from Diamond Harbour Road to the western limit of Port Commissioner's land.; on the east by Diamond Harbour Road (road excluded) from Majerhat Bridge up to the extreme Southern limit of CPC land as also limit of Calcutta Municipal boundary. Then following Port Commissioner's Port Land Park to its junction of Raja Santosh Road and crossing the road, then following the southern side of Raja Santosh Road, running straight towards west up to where it meets Diamond Harbour Road, high level approach portion of Majerhat Bridge, then southwards following the eastern side of Diamond Harbour Road and Majerhat Bridge to the northern boundary of the railway line at Majerhat; on the south from Diamond Harbour Road extreme southern boundary pillars of CPC land west-wards along the Calcutta Municipal boundary, where it meets Banamali Naskar Road, thence by the north side of Banamali Naskar Road to its junction with Budge Budge Road thence along southern and western boundary of CPC Land; and on the west along the western extremity of CPC Land from Budge Budge Road up to level crossing of old Budge Budge Railway line.

Behala Women police station, located at the same address as above, covers all police districts under the jurisdiction of the South West division i.e. Sarsuna, Taratala, Behala, Parnasree, Thakurpukur and Haridevpur.

== Education ==
Taratala has many educational institutes for higher studies like Institute of Hotel Management Kolkata. Some popular schools near Taratala are Mint School, Meghmala Roy Education Centre, St. Joseph and Mary's School, Ruby Park Public School, DAV Public School, M.P.Birla Foundation H.S. School, National Gems School, Orient Day School, Vivekananda Mission School, Gurukul School, Sunny Preparatory School, Mother's Mission School, South End Academy, Oxford Mission school. Some of the popular career Counselling and job consultancies near Taratala are ICA, NIIT Behala, Arena Multimedia, Aptech Behala, Alankrita Careers, Alankrita Tutorials, Pathfinder. Marine Engineering & Research Institute.
