= Şakir Selim =

- Born: 10 April 1942; Biyuk-Ass Ak-Sheikh district, Crimean ASSR, RSFSRUSSR
- Died: 18 November 2008; Simferopol, Ukraine
- Occupation: Poet and translator
- Citizenship: Soviet Union→Ukraine
- Years active: 1960 - 2008

Şakir Selim (sometimes also Shakir Selim; 10 April 1942 – 18 November 2008) was a Crimean Tatar poet, publicist, translator.

== Life ==
Şakir Selim was born in the village of Biyuk-Ass of the Crimean Autonomous Soviet Socialist Republic. Şakir, the 8th child of the family, was deported together with his family first to the Ural Mountains and then to Turkestan on May 18, 1944. When he was seven, he lost his mother. He finished his high school in 1958 in Samarkand. In 1974, Selim graduated from the Philological Faculty of Samarkand University.

Şakir Selim sent his poem "Mother", written during his military service, to the LLenin Bayrağı newspaper, which was the only press body of the Crimean Tatar language at that time in the Soviet Union. This poem dedicated to his mother was published in 1963. His poetry activity began with that. After his military service, Şakir Selim entered to the Russian Language and Literature Faculty at Samargand State University.

The latest poetry book of Şakir Salim was the "Kırımname", presented to readers in 2006. He died on 18 November 2008, in Simferopol.
