= Şakir Bayhan =

Turkish lexicographer and forestry engineer (1938–2019)

- Born: October 4, 1938; Bijelo Polje, Kingdom of Yugoslavia
- Died: February 15, 2019 (aged 80); Ankara, Turkey
- Education: Istanbul University, Forestry Engineering
- Known for: dictionarist, lexicographer
- Notable work: Western Balkan languages (Bosnian, Serbian, Croatian)

Şakir Bayhan (4 October 1938 – 15 February 2019) was a Turkish lexicographer, and forestry engineer. One of the unique lexicographers worked on Balkan Languages, whose main profession is not linguistics.

== Background ==
He was born in Bijelo Polje, Montenegro on 1938. He attended elementary school in this small town, under the pressure of German invasion during World War II.

After completing his high school education, in Novi Pazar, Serbia, he emigrated from former Yugoslavia, where the suffering after-effects of the war were experienced during those days, to Turkey in 1959 with his family.

He graduated from Istanbul University, Faculty of Forestry in 1969 as a Forest Engineer M.Sc. Having graduated, he started to work as Head Forestry Engineer in the Turkish Ministry of Forestry and worked until his retirement in 2002.

== Lexicography Works ==
During his university years, he began to work on former Yugoslavian languages (Bosnian, Serbian, Croatian), which would become the basis of his future works and publications.

He continued his researches on West Balkan languages, during his military service between 1969 and 1970. In the following years, he prepared a hand-written Serbian-Croatian / Turkish dictionary consisting of 15,000 words as the result of 9 years of work. He began to work in cooperation with Turkish Language Association in the early 2000s. This cooperation and hard work resulted in 2015 by the creation of a Bosnian / Turkish dictionary, having more than 30.000 words and 65.000 items and examples.

He also made many contributions to the study of Balkan Languages, in terms of discovering new-old words, idioms, synonyms with the cooperation of the lexicographers and language scientists, living either in Balkan countries or the ones who emigrated to third countries years ago.

His publications are being used as citing sources for academic writing either by many linguists, lexicographers and academics or in articles regarding Balkan culture, politics and the other issues. Besides his linguistic studies, he also worked for improving cultural relations between Montenegro and Turkey.

He died on February 15, 2019, in Ankara.

== Publications ==
- Turkish - Serbian / Serbian - Turkish Dictionary, 2004, ISBN 978-9-75-270322-3
- Turkish - Bosnian / Bosnian - Turkish Dictionary, 2006, ISBN 978-9-94-458060-1
- Turkish - Serbian / Serbian - Turkish Dictionary, Revised Second edition, 2010, ISBN 978-6-05-551518-8
- Turkish - Bosnian / Bosnian - Turkish Dictionary, Second Edition, 2011, ISBN 978-9-94-458060-1
- Turkish - Serbian / Serbian - Turkish Dictionary, Third Edition, 2012, ISBN 978-6-05-551518-8
- Bosnian - Turkish Dictionary, 2015, Turkish Language Association , ISBN 978-9-75-163124-4
- Bosnian - Turkish Dictionary, 2018, Revised Second Publication Turkish Language Association , ISBN 978-9-75-163124-4
- Bosnian / Turkish Dictionary of Idioms, 2018, ISBN 978 975 1635440
