= Şakir Yavuz =

Turkish-German business executive

Sakir Yavuz
- Şakir Yavuz
- Born: September 20, 1968 (age 56); Erzurum, Anatolia, Turkey
- Occupation: Business executive
- Known for: President of Perfect Timing Holding

Şakir Yavuz (born 20 September 1968 in Erzurum, Turkey) is a Turkish German business executive and philanthropist. He is the president of Perfect Timing Holding (PTH) consortium and founder and president of ATAFOM University International headquartered in Bangui, Central African Republic (CAR).

== Early life and education ==
Şakir Yavuz was born in Anatolia, Erzurum city in 1968 to Mehmet and Behice Yavuz as the first son and third child of the family. He had his early education in Erzurum before he moved to Germany with his family at the age of twelve in 1980. In Germany, he attended sports academy where he trained in Kung Fu, Kickboxing, Thai boxing and other martial arts and later became an assistant trainer before establishing his own sports school in Lübeck, Germany at the age of 17 in 1985. After leaving sports academy, Yavuz was educated at Business School of Economics. In 1992, he was appointed President of the International All Style Kick-Boxing Federation.

== Business career ==
Yavuz is the president of Perfect Timing Holding (PTH) consortium with headquarters in Turkey and offices in Africa, Asia and Europe. PTH operates 55 business units in 22 countries with focus on financial technology, information and communication technology, transportation, education, healthcare, sports management, tourism and arts collection.

Yavuz is the founder and president of ATAFOM University International headquartered in Bangui, Central African Republic (CAR). Established in 2019, the university has offices in many locations in America, Europe, Africa and Asia. Its headquarters is situated on 707 hectares of land in the capital city of the CAR.
