= Şakir Bilgin =

German-Turkish writer

Şakir Bilgin (born 1951 in Bolu) is a German-Turkish writer. He studied in Istanbul and he worked as a physical education teacher in Turkey and Cologne.

He was arrested in 1982 during his vacation in Turkey because he was related to Devrimci Sol.

== Works ==
- Güneş Her Gün Doğar, 1988
- Devrimden Konuşuyorduk, 1990, Istanbul
- Lasst die Berge unsere Geschichte erzählen. Dipa Verlag, Frankfurt 1991
- Bırak Öykümüzü Dağlar Anlatsın,1992
- Sürgündeki Yabancı, 1998, Istanbul
- Bir Daha Susma Yüreğim, 2001, Köln
- Güzellikler Yeter Bana, 2003, Köln
- Ich heiße Meryem, nicht Miriam. Internationales Kulturwerk-Hildesheim, 2005
