= Shaqir Rexhepi =

Macedonian footballer

Personal information
- Date of birth: 21 October 1987 (age 39)
- Place of birth: Tetovo, SFR Yugoslavia
- Height: 1.90 m (6 ft 3 in)
- Position: Centre-back

Youth career
- Shkëndija Tetovo

Senior career*
Years	Team	Apps	(Gls)
2006–2007	Shkëndija Tetovo	20	(0)
2007–2008	Renova	28	(0)
2009	Sloboda Tuzla	8	(0)
2009–2010	Vëllaznimi		
2010	Zonguldakspor	1	(0)
2011	Al-Taawoun	16	(1)
2012	Košice	13	(0)
2012–2013	Poli Timișoara	11	(0)
2013	Shkëndija Tetovo	13	(0)
2014	Honka	4	(0)
2015	PK-35 Vantaa	17	(0)

International career
	Macedonia U19	15	(1)
	Macedonia U21	12	(2)
- * Club domestic league appearances and goals

Shaqir Rexhepi (born 21 October 1987) is a Macedonian former professional footballer who played as a centre-back.

== Career ==
Redžepi played for Shkëndija Tetovo, Renova, Sloboda Tuzla, KF Vëllaznimi, Zonguldakspor, Al Taawon, MFK Košice, ACS Poli Timișoara, Honka and PK-35 Vantaa.
