= Taratala Road =

- Road in Kolkata (Calcutta)
- Location in Kolkata
- Coordinates: 22.5134297°N 88.3075289°E
- Country: India
- State: West Bengal
- District: Kolkata
- City: Kolkata
- KMC Ward: 80

Government
  - Body: Kolkata Municipal Corporation
- PIN: 700088
- Planning agency: KMDA

Taratala Road is an important road that runs through South Kolkata connecting Garden Reach near Ramnagar and Taratala near Taratala Crossing.
