= Majerhat metro station =

Metro station in Kolkata, India

Majerhat
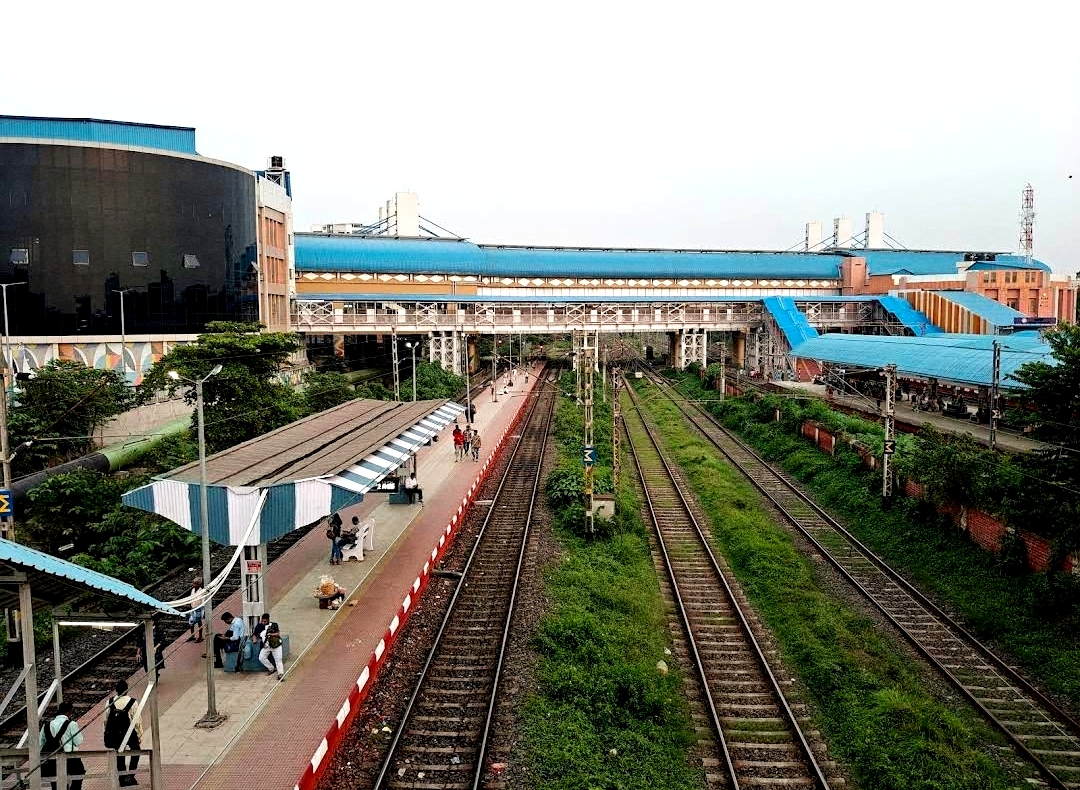
- Majerhat metro station composite structure (station on viaduct and two concourse buildings on either sides) as seen from Majerhat railway station's foot over bridge

General information
- Location: Alipore Mint Colony, Majerhat; Kolkata, West Bengal 700053; India
- Coordinates: 22.5191°N 88.3234°E
- System: Kolkata Metro
- Operator: Metro Railway, Kolkata
- Line: Purple Line
- Platforms: 2 (2 side platforms)
- Tracks: 2
- Connections: Majerhat: Sealdah South; Circular

Construction
- Structure type: Elevated
- Accessible: Yes

Other information
- Status: Operational
- Station code: KMJH

History
- Opened: 6 March 2024; 2 years ago

Services
| Preceding station | Kolkata Metro | Following station |
|---|---|---|
| Terminus | Purple Line | Taratala towards Joka |
| Mominpur towards Esplanade | Purple Line (Future service) | Taratala towards Joka |
Route map
Location

Majerhat metro station is an operational metro station on Purple Line of Kolkata Metro. It is the terminal station of the first phase 1 of this line and the first and only station built over an existing railway network, from Joka to Majerhat. The line was sanctioned in India's railway budget of 2010–11, but due to various hurdles, construction was delayed and missed multiple deadlines. The most notable reason for delays was the Majerhat Bridge collapse in 2018.

== Location ==
Majerhat metro station is located in Alipore Mint Colony, Majerhat, Kolkata, India. It is situated over the Majerhat railway station and parallel to the Majerhat flyover. Taratala is the preceding station towards Joka and Mominpore is the following station towards Esplanade.

== History ==
Since the 14.215 kilometres (8.833 mi) line was sanctioned by then Railway Minister Mamata Banerjee in the Railway budget of 2010–11, it faced several problems which delayed the project. Originally the contracts of the elevated stretch of the line was awarded to Simplex Infrastructures in 2011, although construction couldn't proceed due to land acquisition problems. The contract for construction of the station was re-awarded to Gammon India, in April 2012 by RVNL. In 2018, the adjacent rail over bridge (known as Majerhat Bridge) along the upcoming metro station collapsed, completely stalling the construction of the station as it ran into design, technical and legal challenges. Gammon pulled out of the project after the bridge collapsed. In August 2020, GPT Infraprojects won the bid for construction. Work started in December 2020, with clearance from India Government Mint, Ministry of Finance; which initially didn't allow any elevated structure within a kilometre radius of the mint.

After lot of hardships and developmental work, the Taratala–Majerhat section of Purple Line was inaugurated on 6 March 2024.

== Station layout ==
It is an elevated metro station with two side platforms. It is being implemented by Rail Vikas Nigam Limited (RVNL). The station is 180 m (590 ft)180 m long with twelve spans. The platform and concourse area are 3,050 m^{2} (32,800 sq ft) and 3,100 m^{2} (33,000 sq ft) respectively. It is catered by five escalators, two elevators and five staircases and the whole station is held in between two massive concourse buildings on either side. It is the final station of the proposed phase 1 (Joka to Majerhat) of the Purple Line.

| L2 | Side platform, Doors will open on the left |
| L2 | Platform 2 | Train towards Joka (Taratala) → |
| L2 | Platform 1 | ← Alighting only |
| L2 | Side platform, Doors will open on the left |
| L1 | Concourse | Fare control, station agent, Metro QR ticket vending machines, crossover |
| G | Street level | Exit/Entrance |

=== Entry/exits ===
- C – Garden Reach Flyover, Keventer, Brooklyn Junction, Kantapukur
- D – Diamond Harbour Road, RP Goenka International School, Burdwan Road, Mominpur, Judges Court Road

== Connections ==
=== Bus ===
Mominpur and Majerhat Bus Stop is 242 m (794 ft) and 173 m (568 ft) away from the metro Station respectively.

=== Rail ===
Majerhat metro station is directly above Majerhat of Kolkata Suburban Railway and is connected to main railway platform via a footover bridge, thus facilitating transfers with Budge Budge Branch line and Circular line.

=== Air ===
Behala Airport is 5.11 km (3.18 mi) via Behala Flying Club Road and Taratala Road.

== Gallery ==
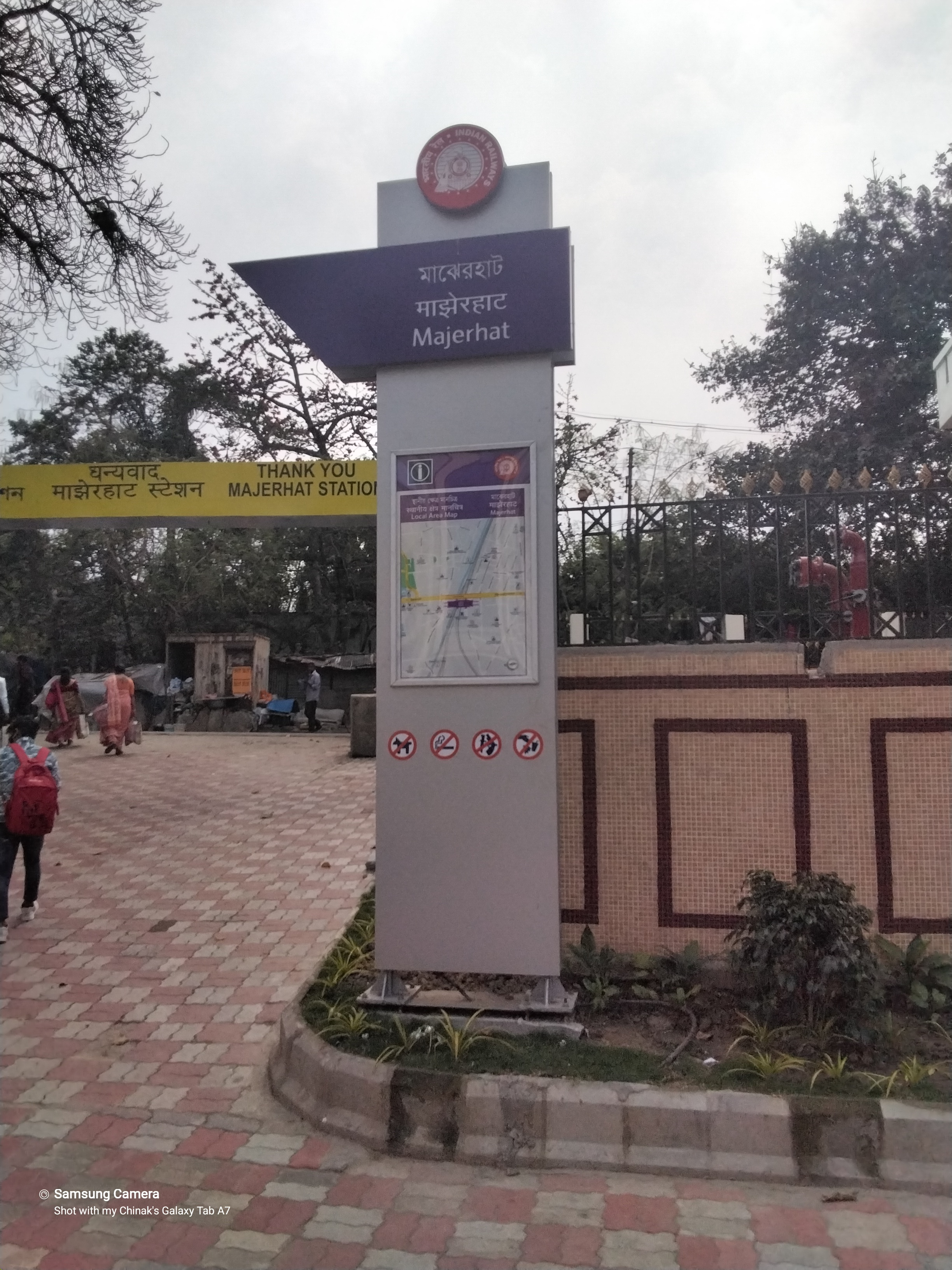
Majerhat metro station signboard

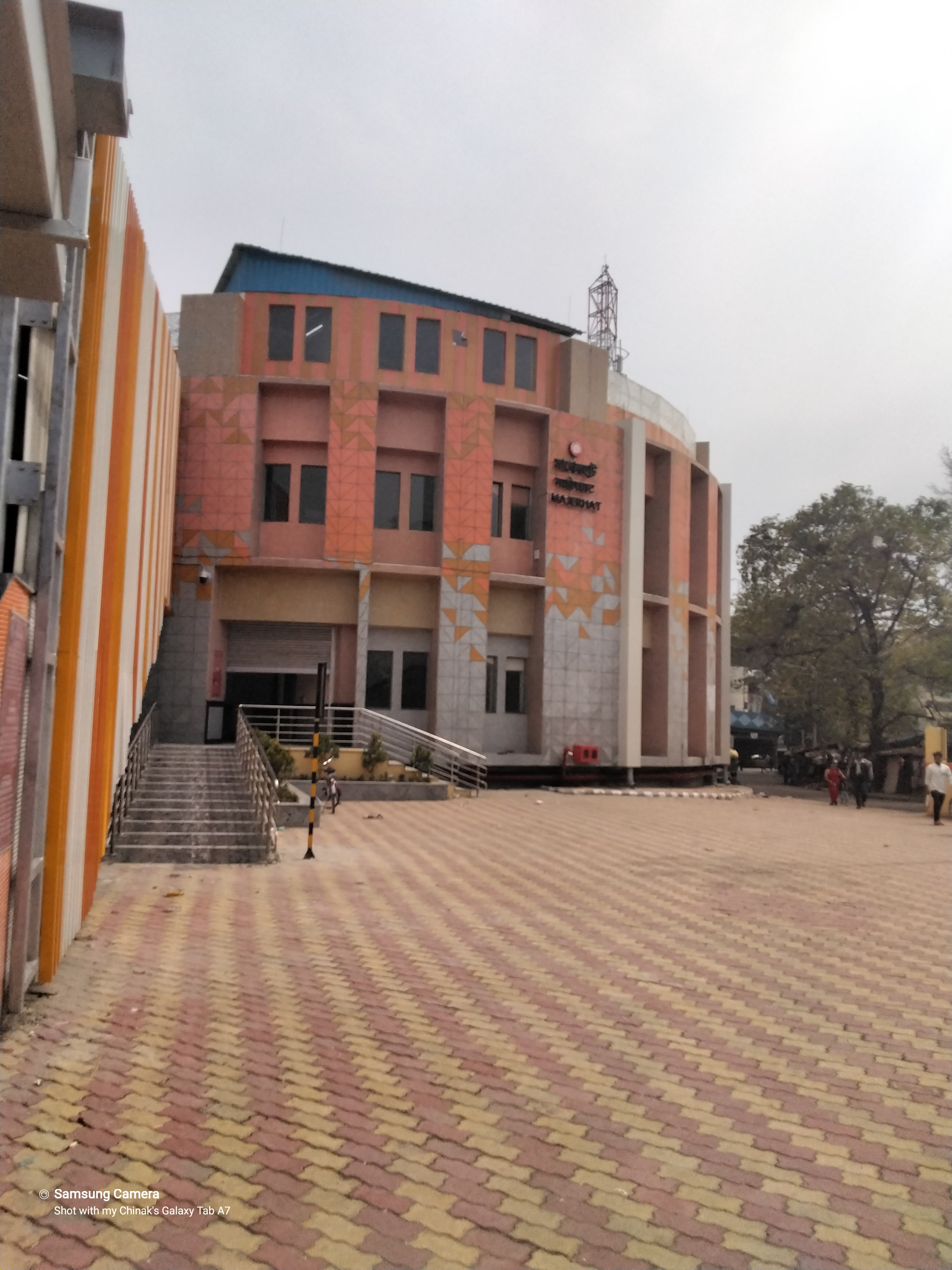
Majerhat metro station second concourse building

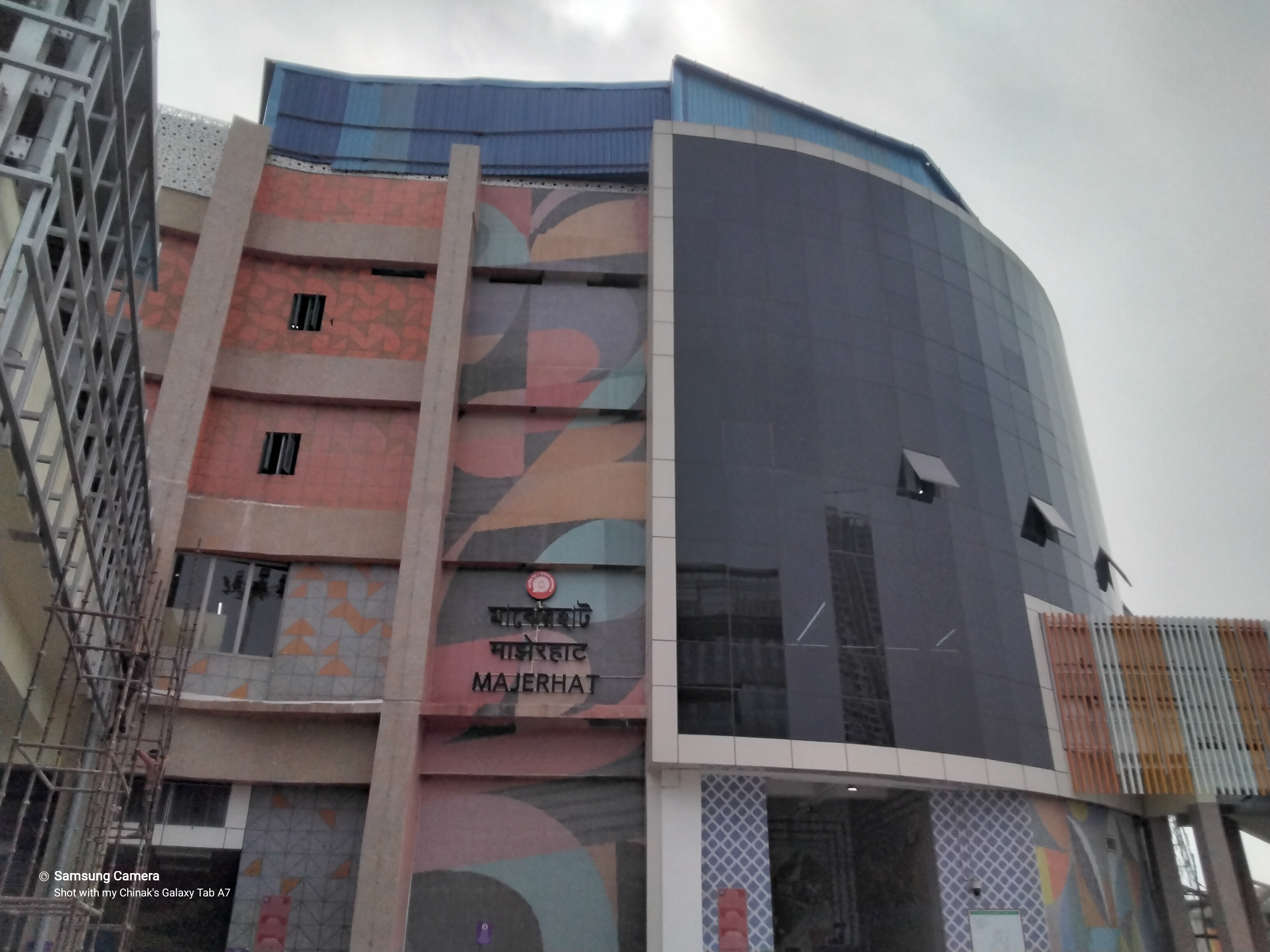
Majerhat metro station first concourse building

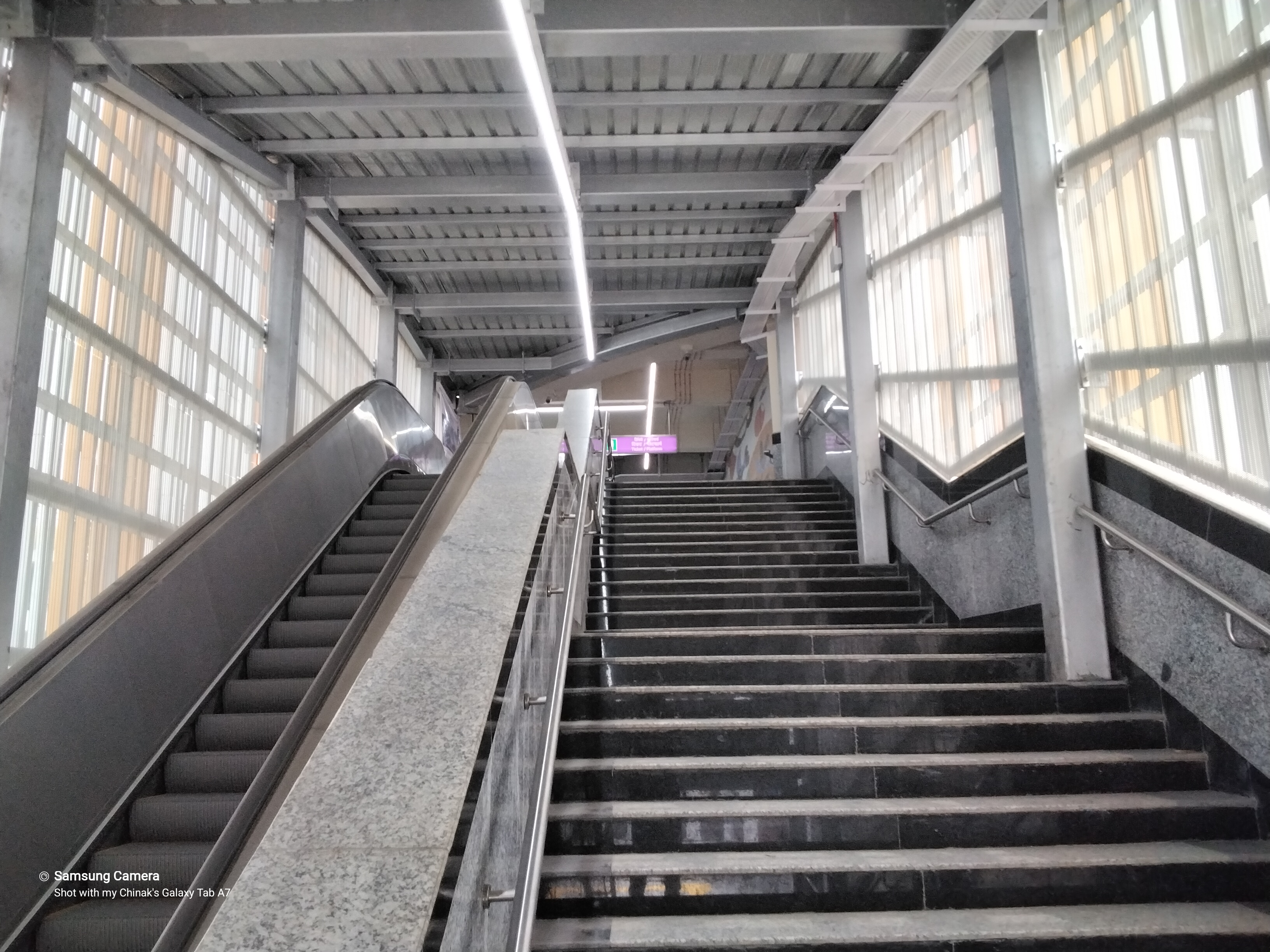
Majerhat metro station staircases

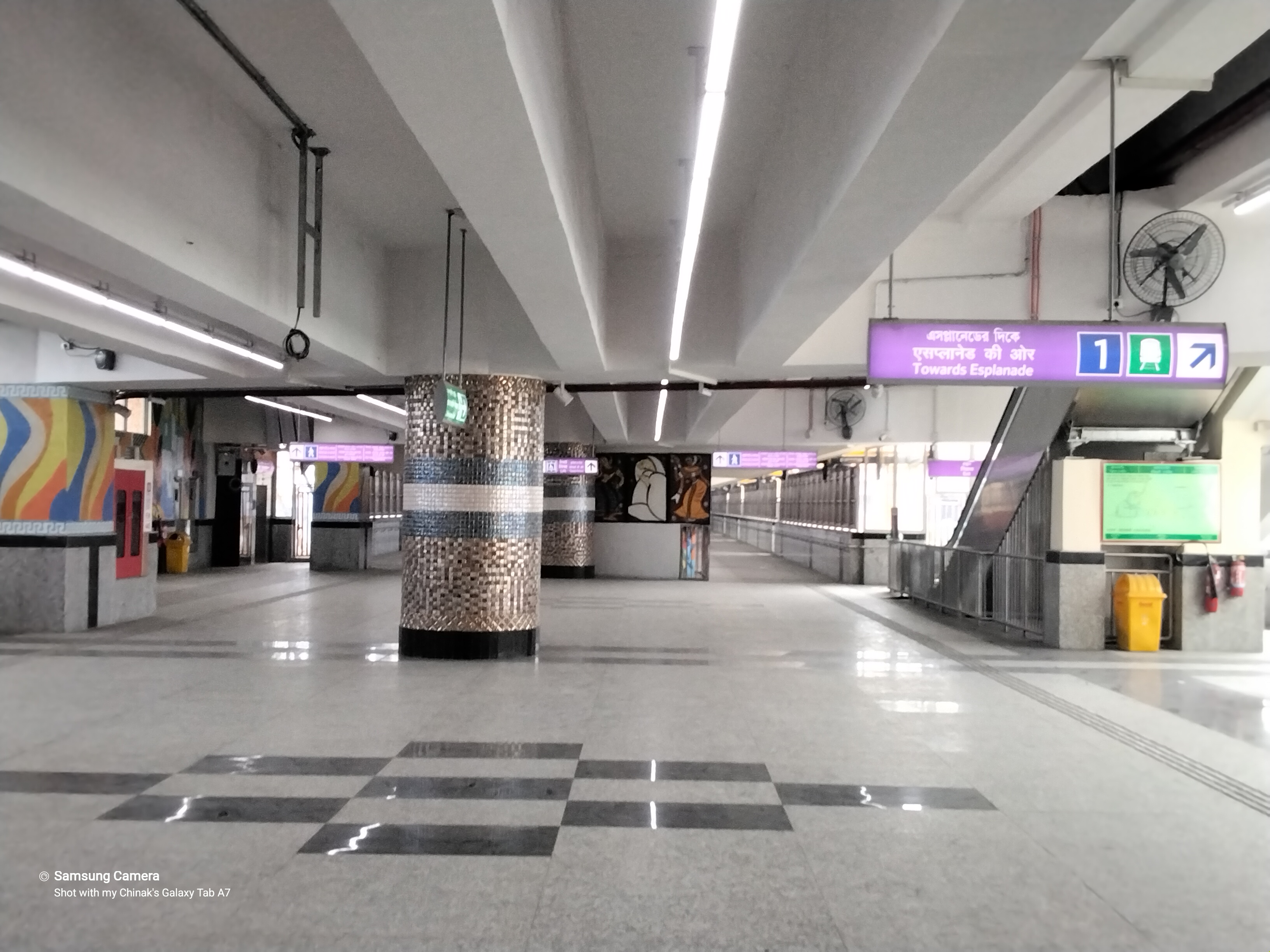
Majerhat metro concourse and walkover

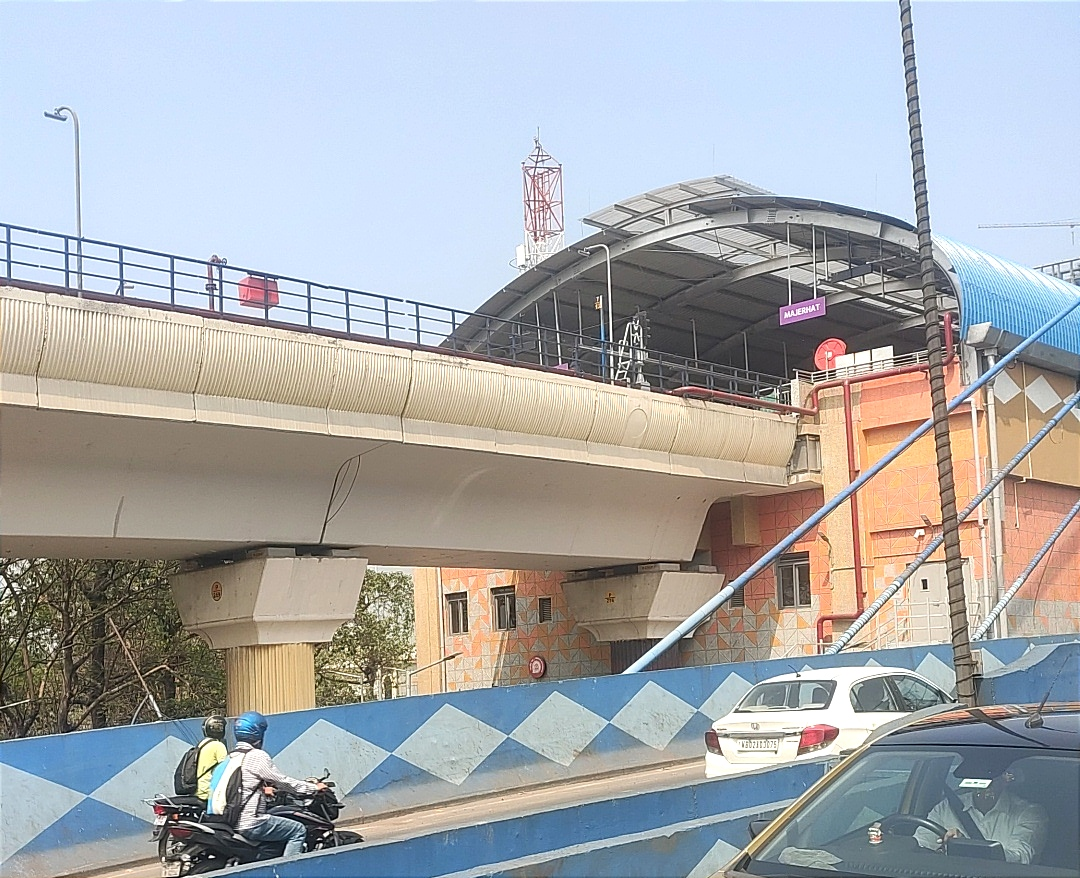
Majerhat metro station as seen from Jai Hind Setu

Majerhat metro station composite structure

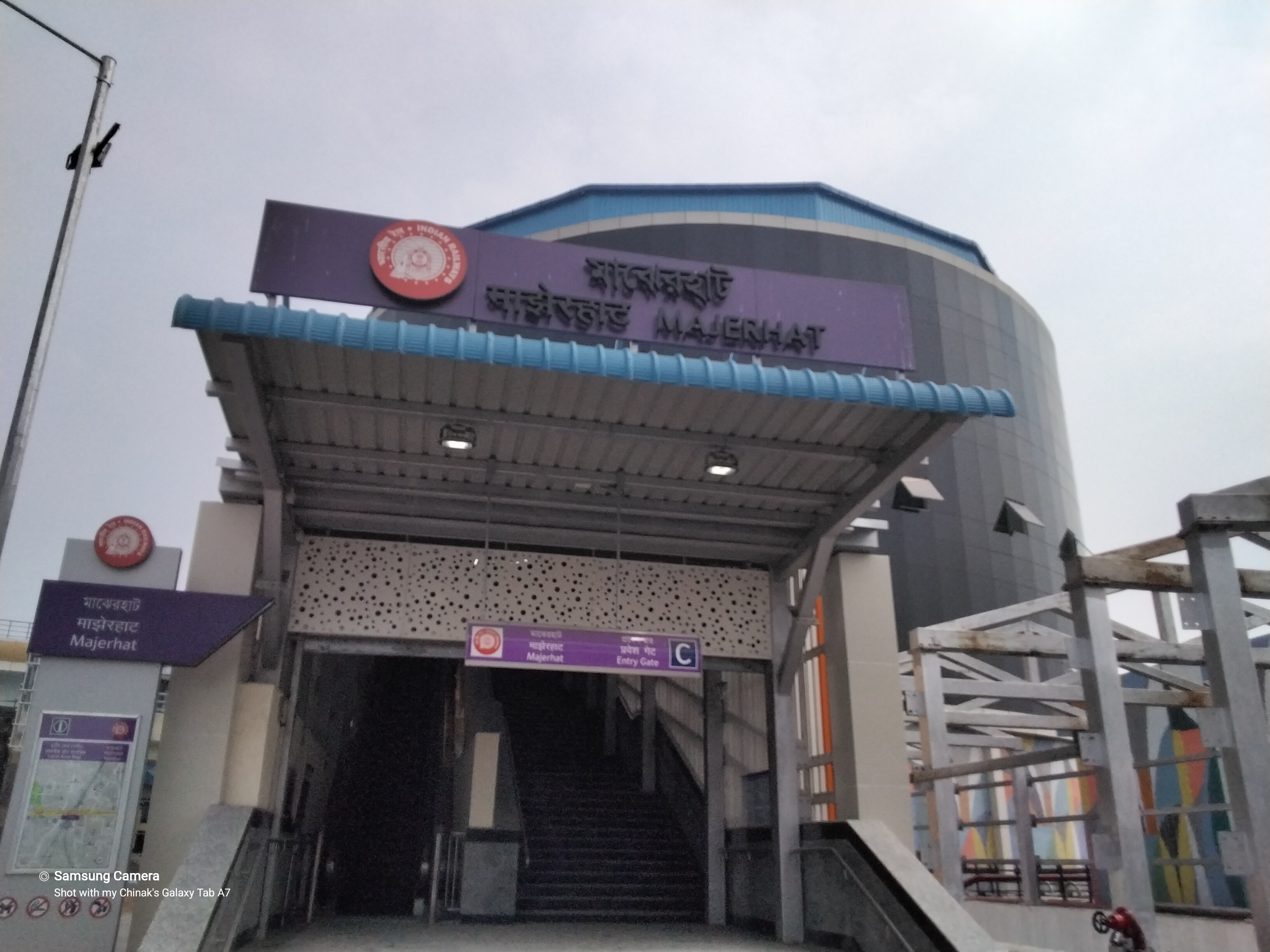
Majerhat metro station entrance

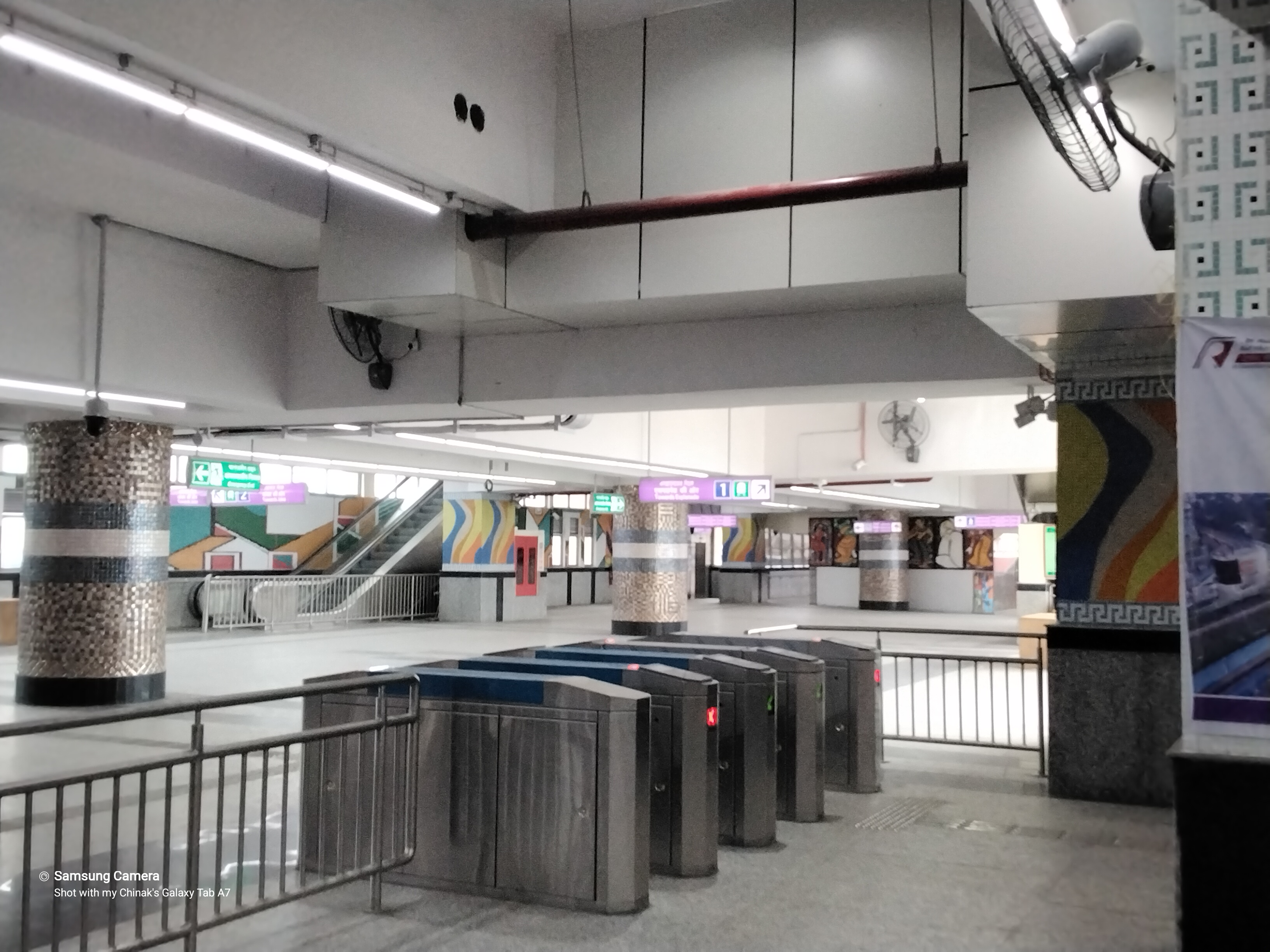
Majerhat metro station AFC-PC gates

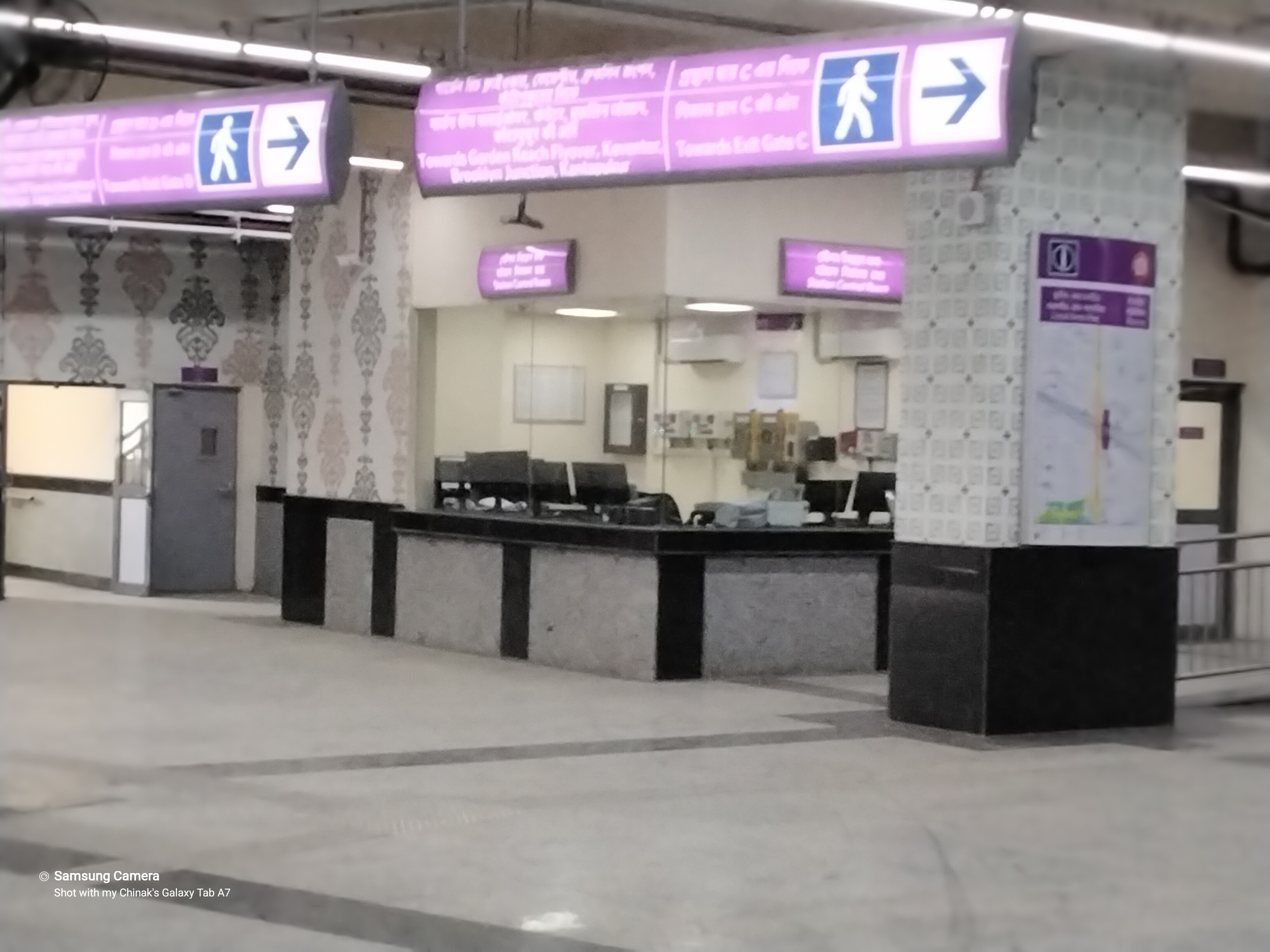
Majerhat metro station control room

== See also ==
- Dum Dum metro station
