= Joka metro station =

Kolkata Metro's Purple Line terminal metro station

Joka
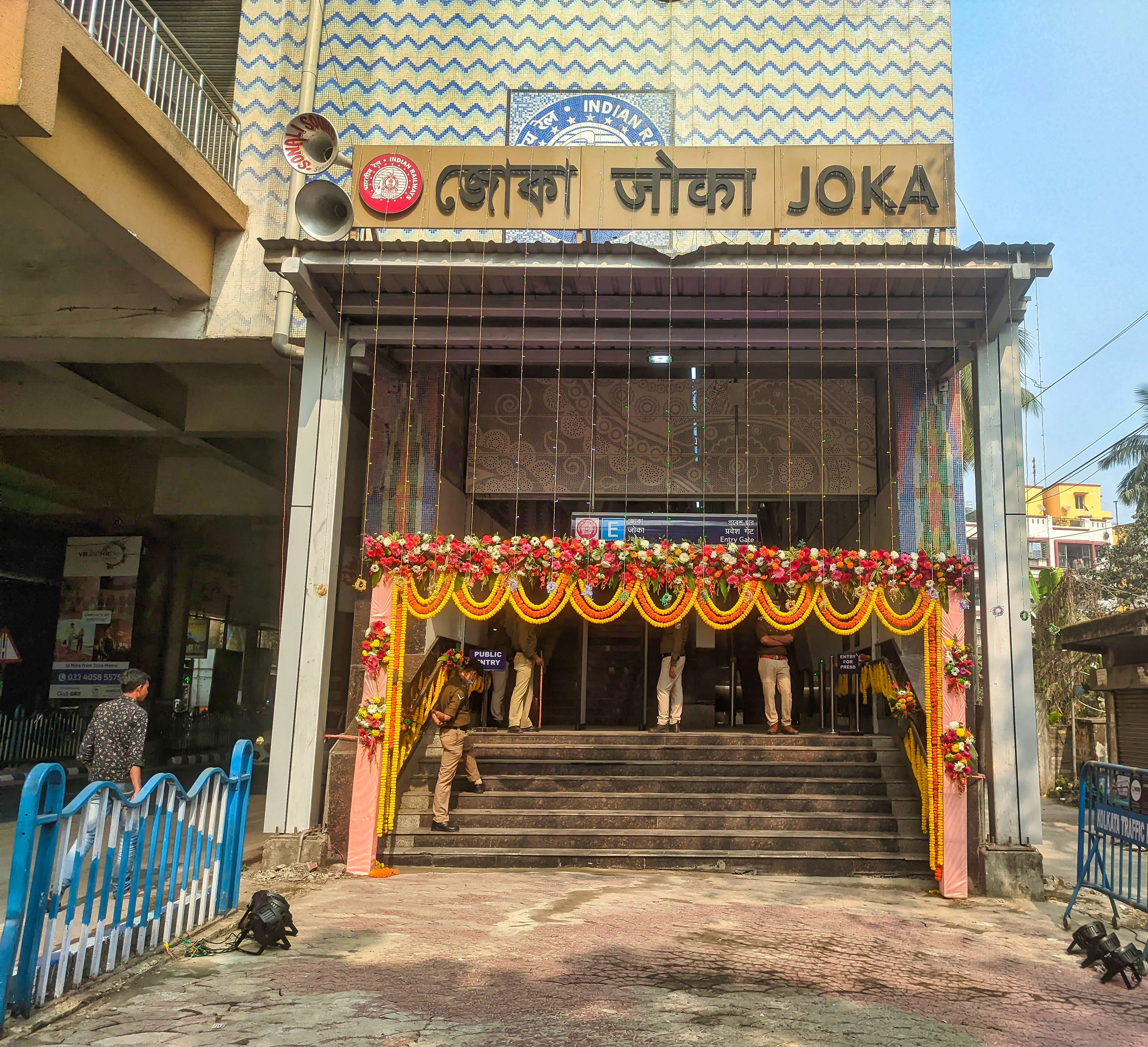
- Entrance E on the day of inauguration, 30 December 2022

General information
- Location: Bratachari Gram, Joka, Kolkata, West Bengal 700104; India
- Coordinates: 22.45224°N 88.30175°E
- System: Kolkata Metro
- Operator: Metro Railway, Kolkata
- Line: Purple Line
- Platforms: 2 (2 Side platform)

Construction
- Structure type: Elevated
- Accessible: Yes

Other information
- Status: Operational
- Station code: KJKA

History
- Opened: 30 December 2022; 3 years ago

Services
Preceding station	Kolkata Metro	Following station
Thakurpukur towards Majerhat	Purple Line	Terminus
Route map
Location

Joka is the elevated southern terminal metro station on the North-South corridor of the Purple Line of Kolkata Metro in Kolkata, West Bengal, India. The station is located in Joka. It will be the terminal station of the Purple Line till the phase 2 of the project. In future, the line will be extended 1.7 km more, till IIM-Joka. The station was commissioned on 30 December 2022.

== History ==
Purple Line was approved in the railway budget for the financial year 2010-2011 and Rs 2,6519 crore was allocated for the construction work. In October 2011, RVNL won the tender for the construction of the Metro Corridor from Joka metro station to Esplanade metro station along with the Joka metro station.

Trial runs on the 6.5-km Joka-Taratla stretch of Kolkata Metro's Purple Line began in mid-September 2022, and it received mandatory Commissioner of Railway Safety (CRS) clearance in November.

The Joka–Taratala stretch was inaugurated by Prime Minister Narendra Modi on 30 December 2022 in the presence of West Bengal Chief Minister Mamata Banerjee and Railway Minister Ashwini Vaishnaw. Some students from schools like St Thomas Boys School were granted the rare opportunity to be the first ones to ride in this Joka–Taratala stretch after the inauguration.

== Station layout ==
L2	Side platform, Doors will open on the left
L2	Platform 2	Alighting only →
L2	Platform 1	← Train towards Majerhat (Thakurpukur)
L2	Side platform, Doors will open on the left
L1	Concourse	Fare control, station agent, Metro QR ticket vending machines, crossover
G	Street level	Exit/Entrance

== Gallery ==
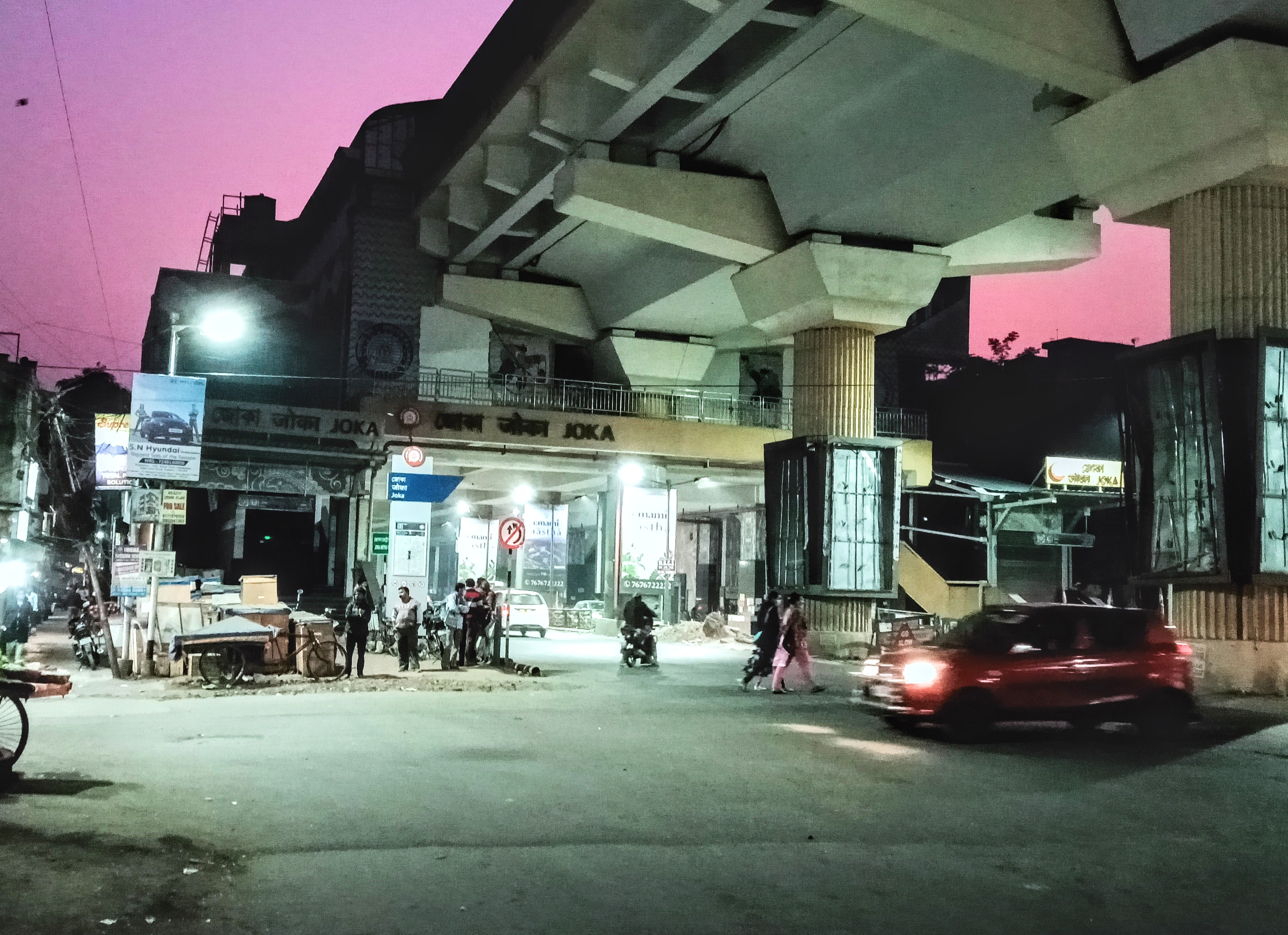
Joka metro station during December, 2021

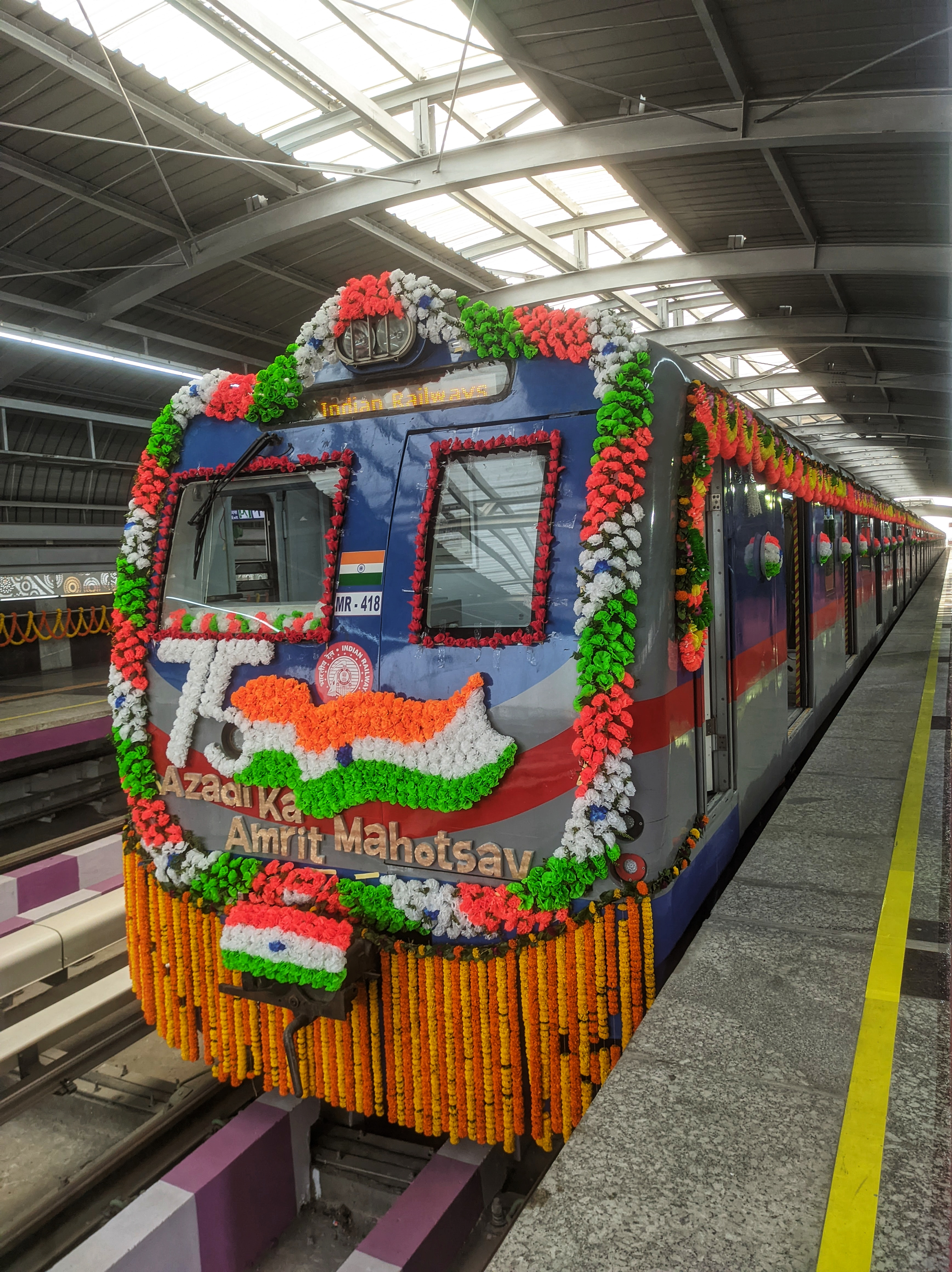
ICF MEDHA rake MR 418 on the inauguration day of Phase 1 of Purple Line at Joka metro station
