= St. Thomas' School, Kolkata =

Primary, secondary and higher secondary school in Kolkata, West Bengal, India

St Thomas' School

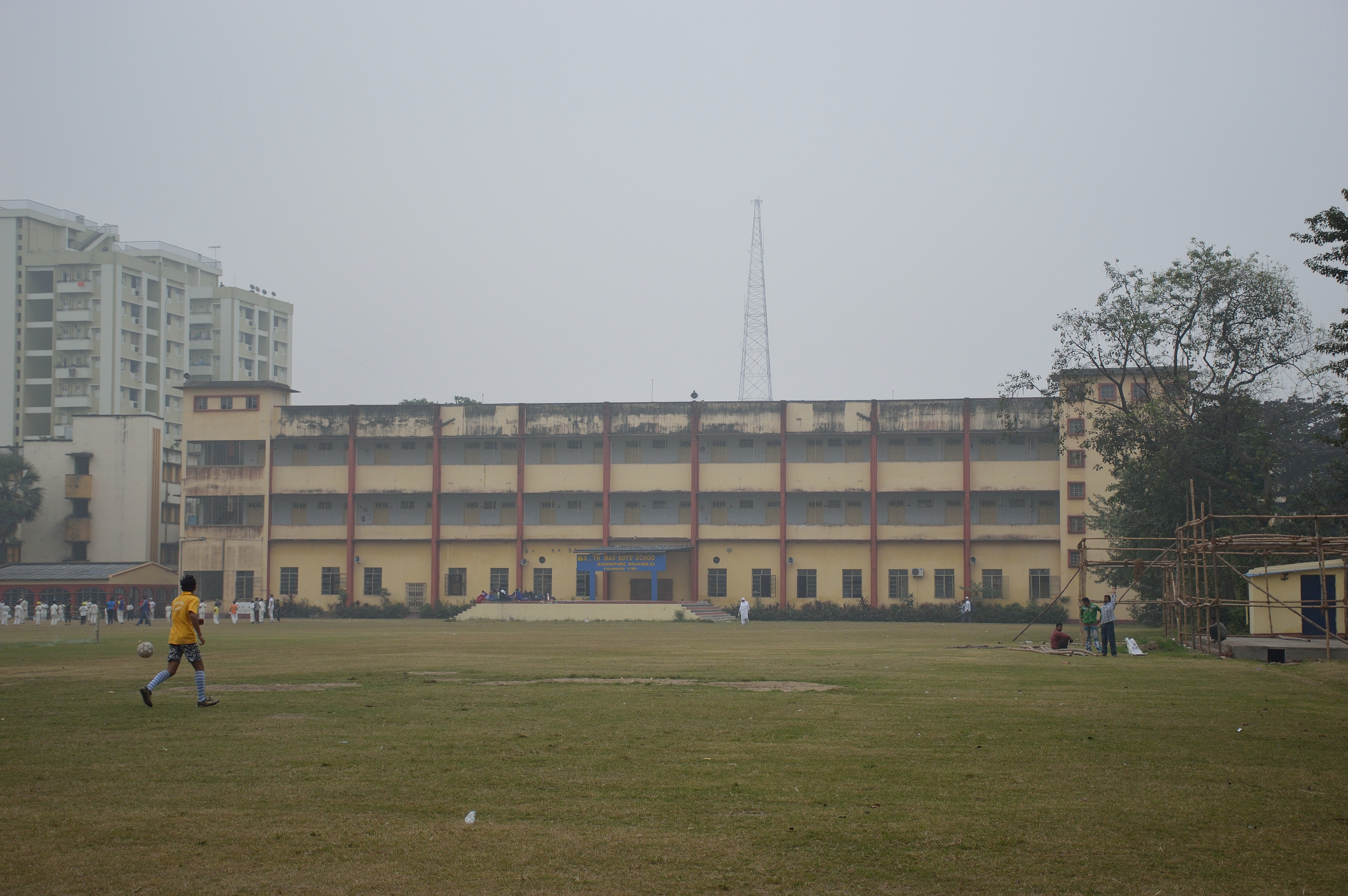
- St Thomas Boys School

Location
- 4 Diamond Harbour Road, Kidderpore; Kolkata, West Bengal, 700 023; India; 22.5388038°N 88.3268685°E

Information
- Type: Primary, secondary and higher secondary
- Motto: Latin: Nisi Dominus Frustra (Except the Lord, effort in Vain)
- Established: 1789; 237 years ago
- School board: Council for the Indian School Certificate Examinations
- Principal: Boys-Mr. Suman Biswas Girls-Mrs. R.S.Elias
- Gender: Co-educational
- Language: English
- Website: www.stsboys.com stsgirls.com

St Thomas' School is a co-educational kindergarten to higher secondary school in Kidderpore, Kolkata, West Bengal, India. It was established on 21 December 1789, making it one of the oldest schools in India and has the largest campus in Kolkata. The school is affiliated to the Council for the Indian School Certificate Examinations (ISC), which conducts the ICSE (Grade 10) and ISC (Grade 12) examinations over the country.

== Campus ==
It has three football size fields, two basketball courts and children's playgrounds. The campus also houses the St. Thomas' College of Engineering and Technology and has a church known as St. Stephen's Church. There are two schools and an engineering college and a non-formal technical training centre. St. Thomas' boys' and girls' schools are the two schools here.

== Alumni ==
- Ravish Malhotra, the Indian Air Force pilot, who was a backup cosmonaut to Rakesh Sharma
