= The 42 (Kolkata) =

Residential skyscraper in West Bengal, India

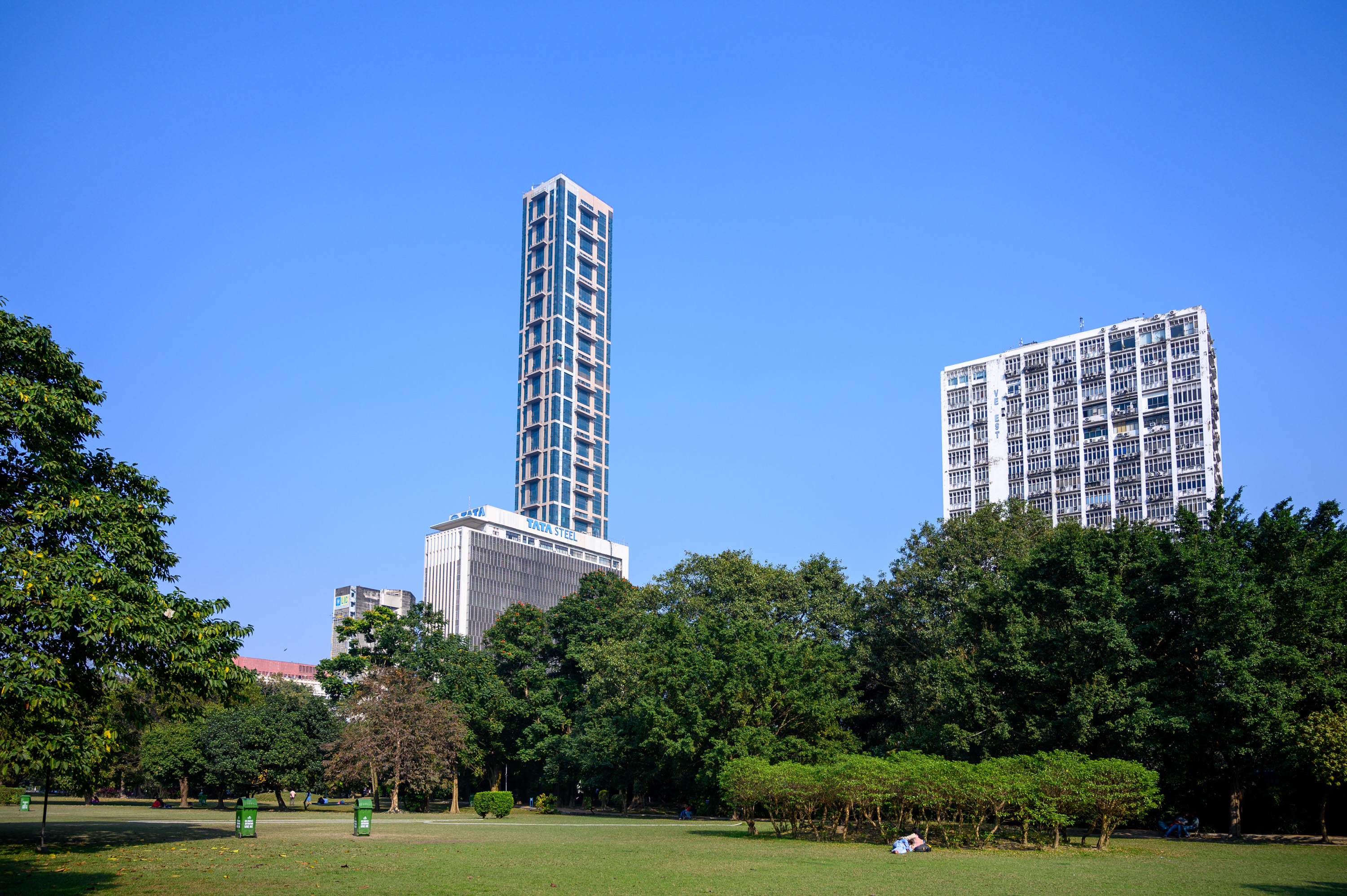
- The 42 as seen in 2020

General information
- Status: Completed
- Type: Residential Skyscraper
- Location: 42B, Jawaharlal Nehru Road, Kolkata, West Bengal, India
- Coordinates: 22.548276°N 88.349613°E
- Groundbreaking: 2008
- Construction started: 2012
- Topped-out: 2019
- Completed: 2019

Height
- Architectural: 249 m (817 ft)
- Tip: 260 m (820 ft)
- Antenna spire: 260 m (820 ft)
- Top floor: 249 metres (817 ft)

Technical details
- Material: Glass / Reinforced Concrete
- Floor count: 65

Design and construction
- Architecture firm: Hafeez Contractor
- Developer: Mani Group, Salarpuria Sattva Group, Diamond Group & Alcove Realty
- Main contractor: ACC India Pvt Ltd (Indian Subsidiary of Arabian Construction Co, Middle East)
- Known for: Tallest building in Kolkata, tallest completed building in India outside Mumbai

The 42 is a residential skyscraper in Kolkata, in the state of West Bengal, India. It is located on Chowringhee Road, the central business district of the city, between the commercial building of Tata Centre and the residential building of Jeevan Sudha. It was first proposed in 2008 but construction was delayed for nearly two years. The construction was completed in 2019, making it the tallest building in the country at that time.

It is the tallest completed building in India outside of Mumbai, and the 14th tallest building in the country overall.

== History ==
The premises originally belonged to the Maharaja of Darbhanga.

== Details ==
Planned by developers Mani Group, Salarpuria Sattva Group, Alcove Realty & Diamond Group, to be Kolkata's tallest residential building. Located on Chowringhee Road, in the middle of the city, the skyscraper has 65 floors.

== Protest ==
The developers of The 42 have faced a civil suit in the Calcutta High Court filed by ITC Limited, the owners of the adjoining 'Fountain Court' property. The suit filed by ITC claims that ITC's right to receive light and air will be violated by the 65-storeyed residential building being constructed to the west of its 'Fountain Court' property. On 19 August 2013, the Calcutta High Court passed an order that any steps taken by the developers would be subject to the outcome of the case filed by ITC. On 8 May 2014, the Court ordered that the developers of The 42 should not proceed with the construction at a pace to defeat the interests of ITC. (Calcutta High Court, GA Case No 2698 / 2013) The matter is pending before the Calcutta High Court.

== Future ==
An neighbouring additional tower called The 42@Middleton will be built.

This is the 2nd tower in "The 42" project located at Chowringhee. It is located at the north-eastern portion of Premises 42B, Chowringhee Road. Since the entry point of this tower is in Middleton Street, the name is given as such.

== Gallery ==
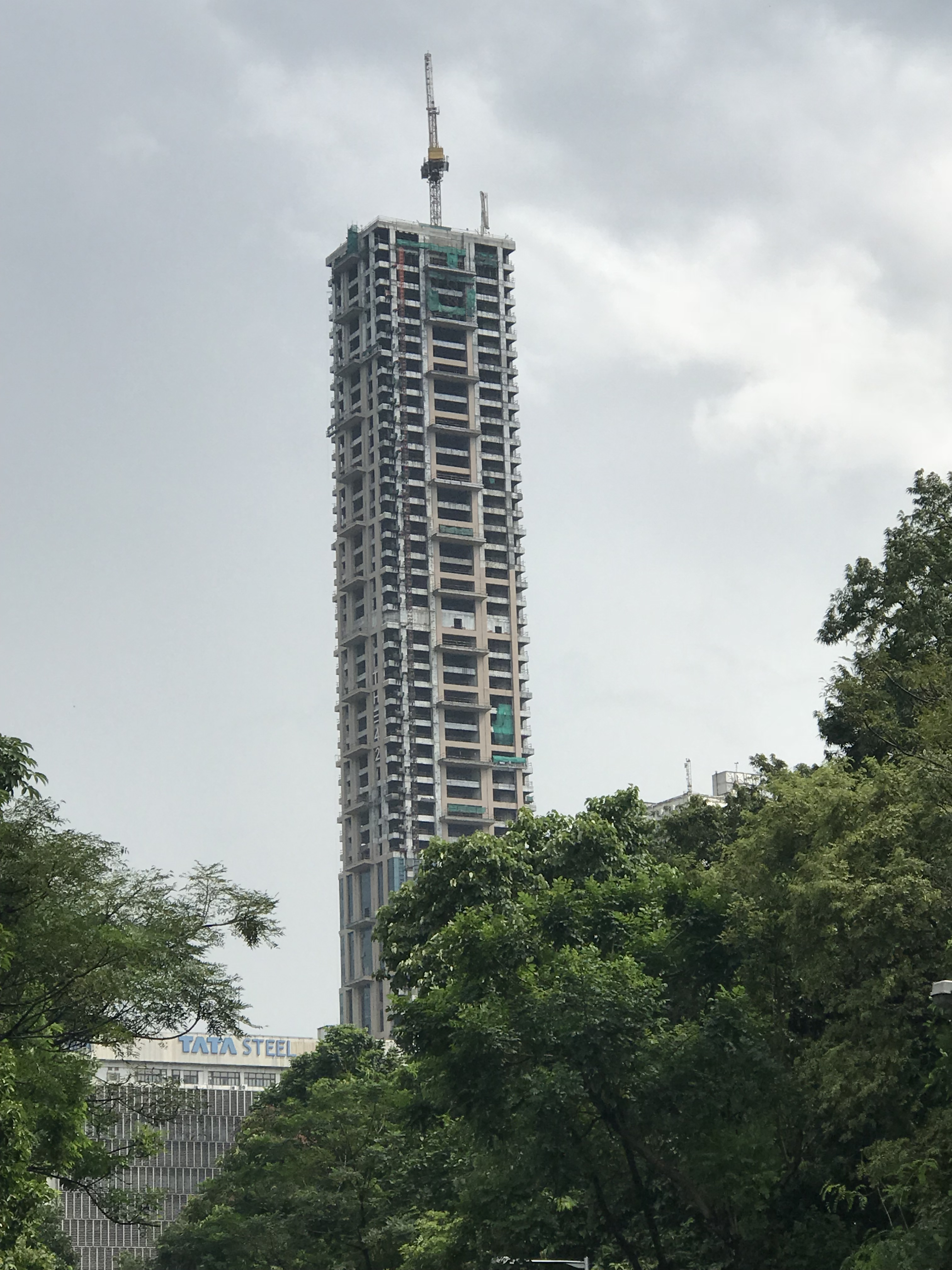
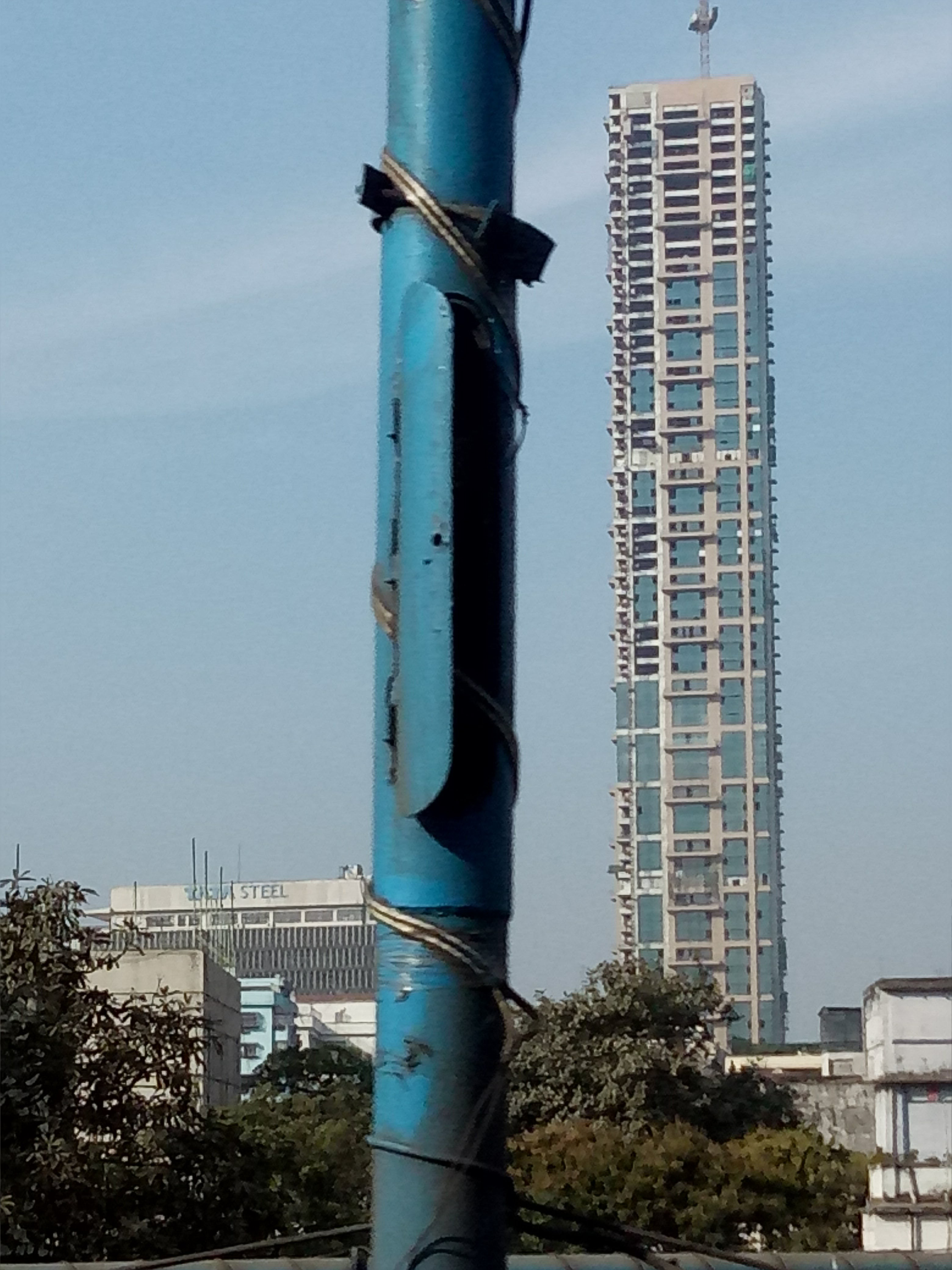
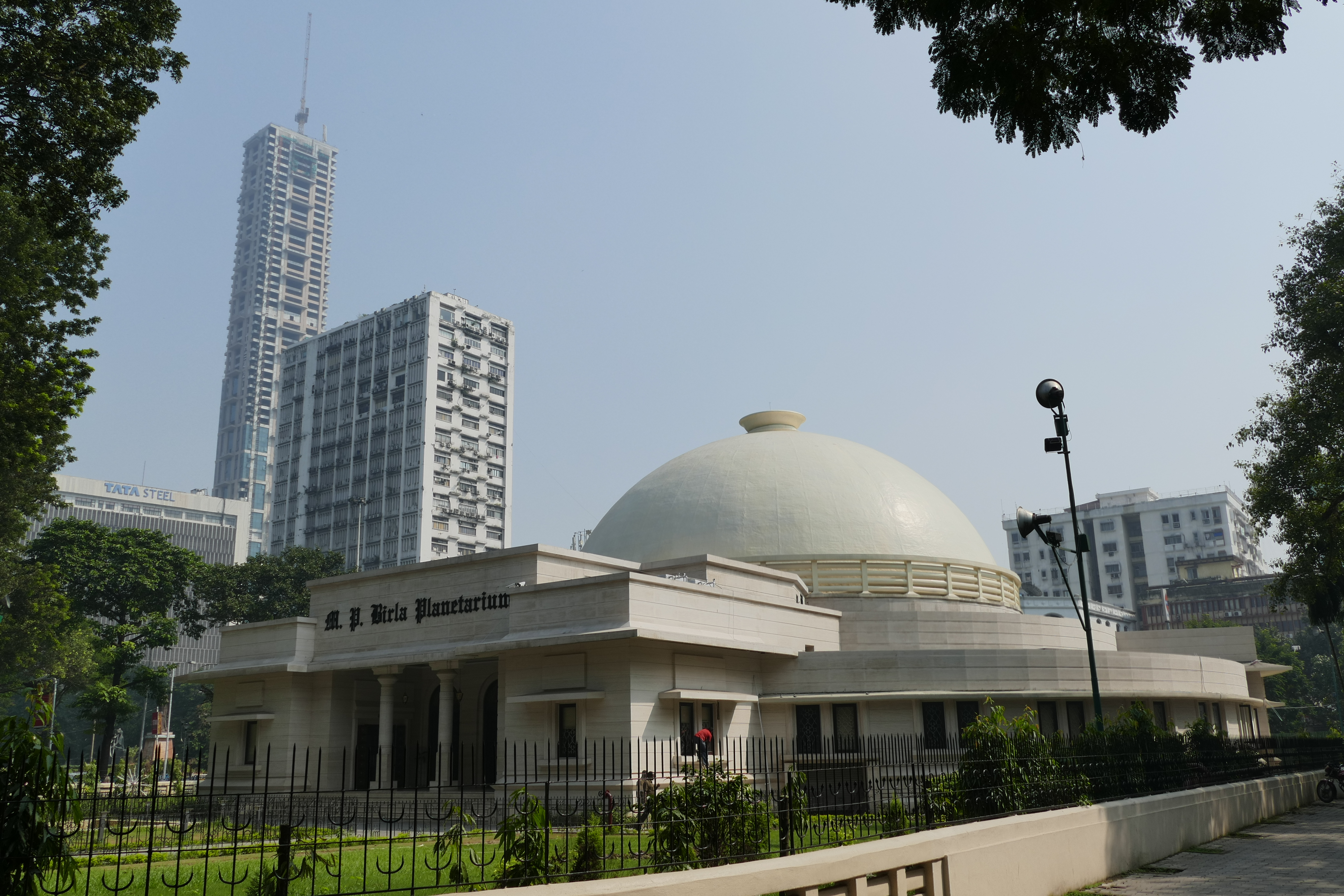
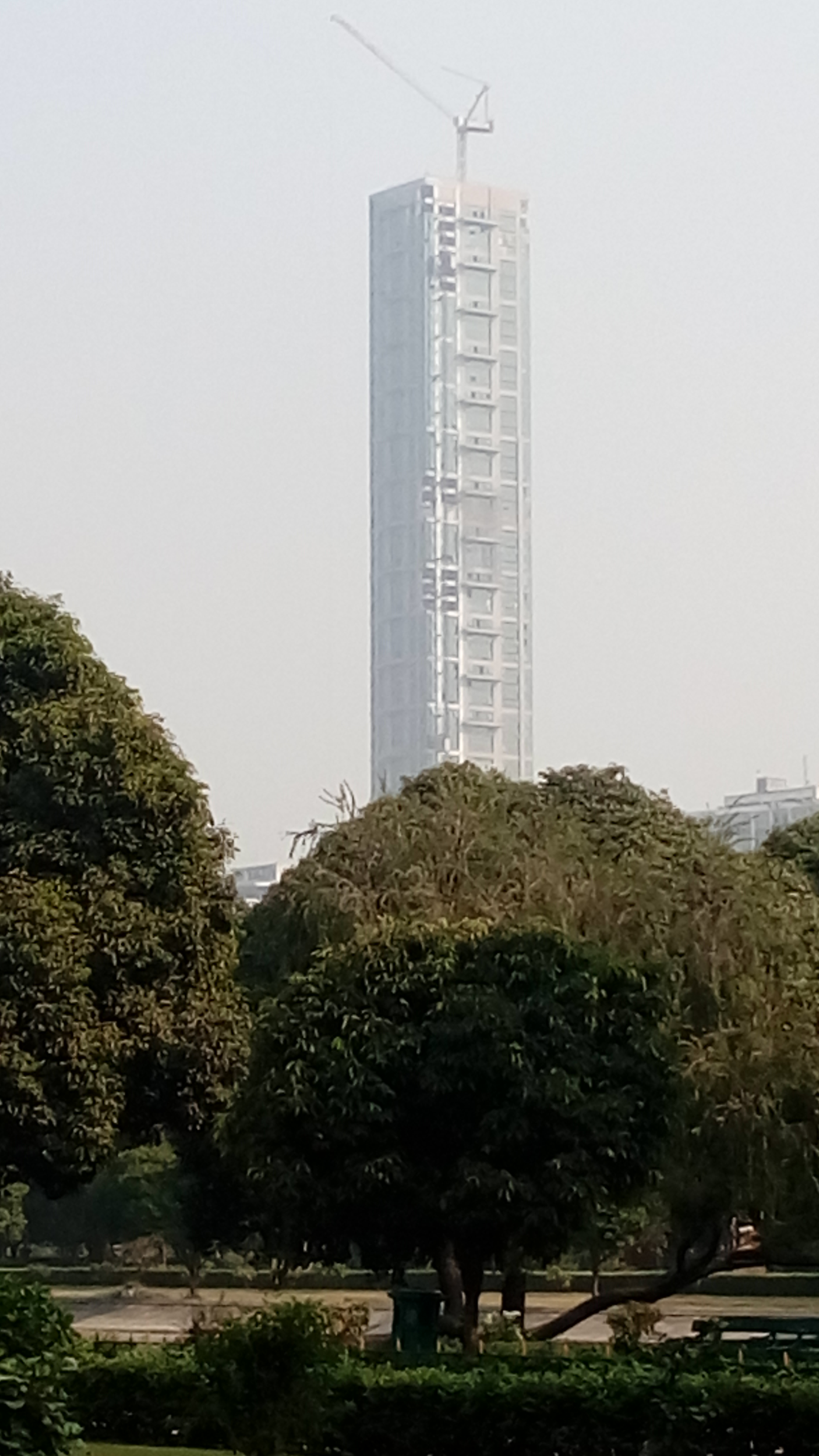
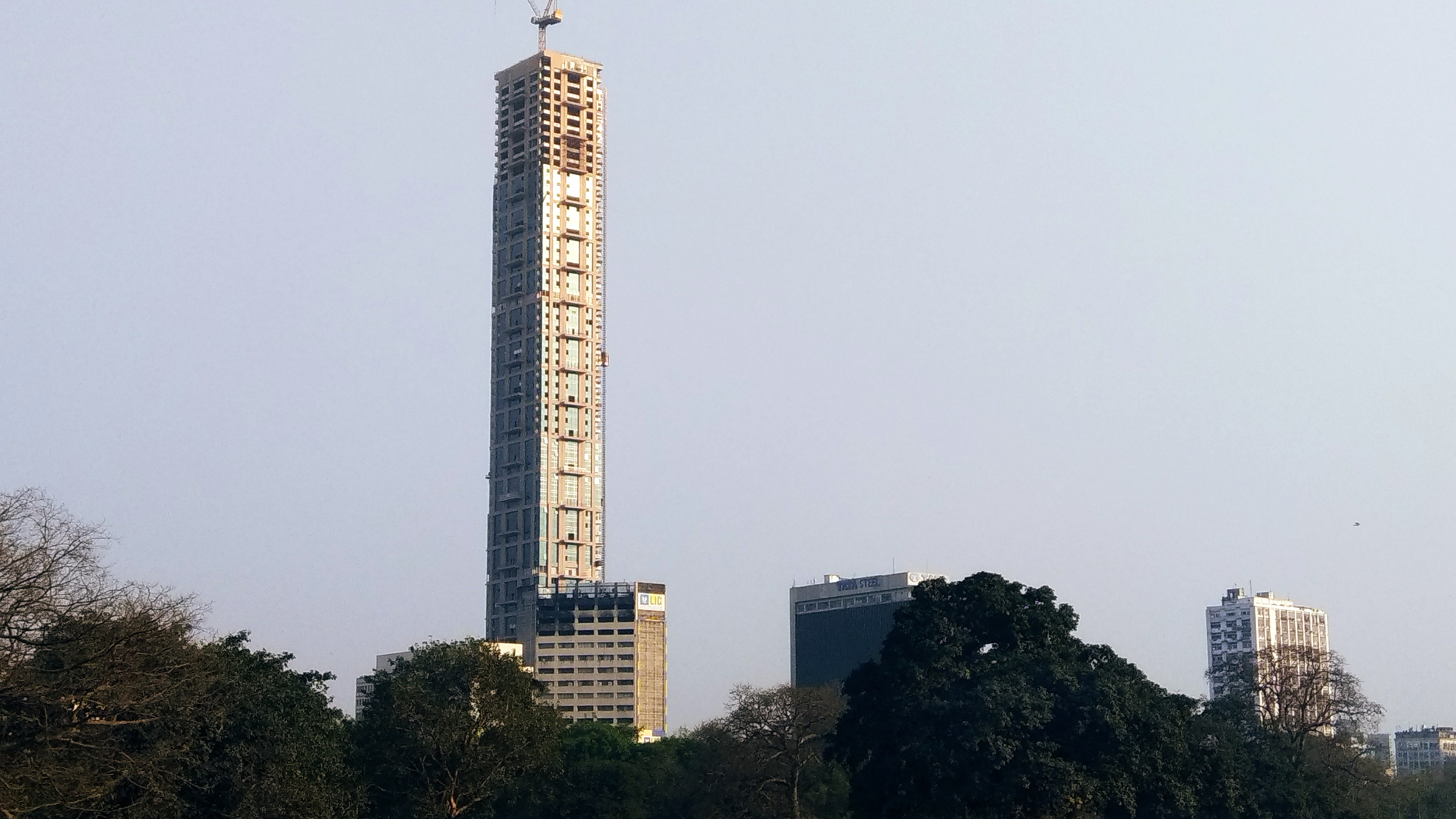
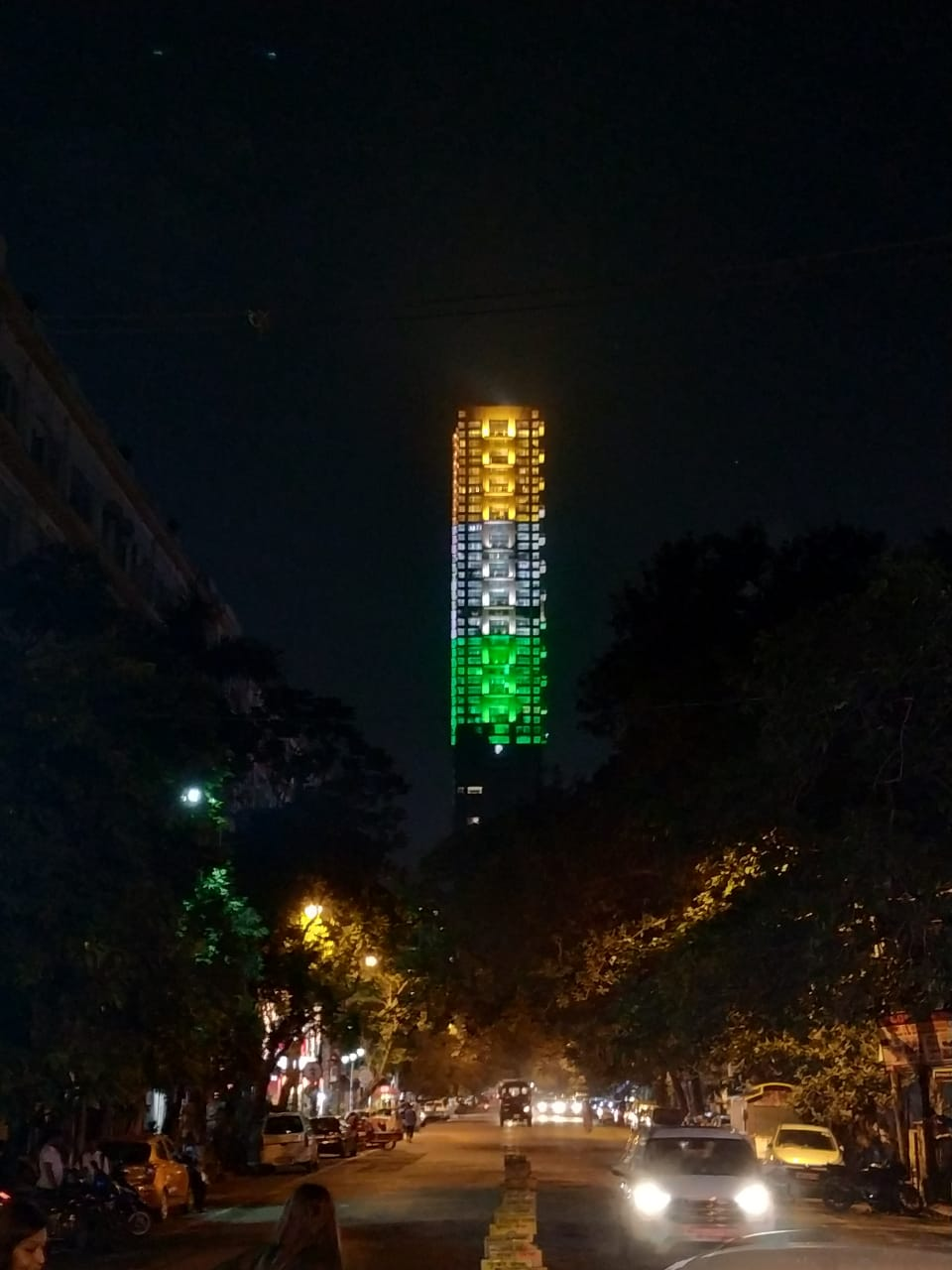
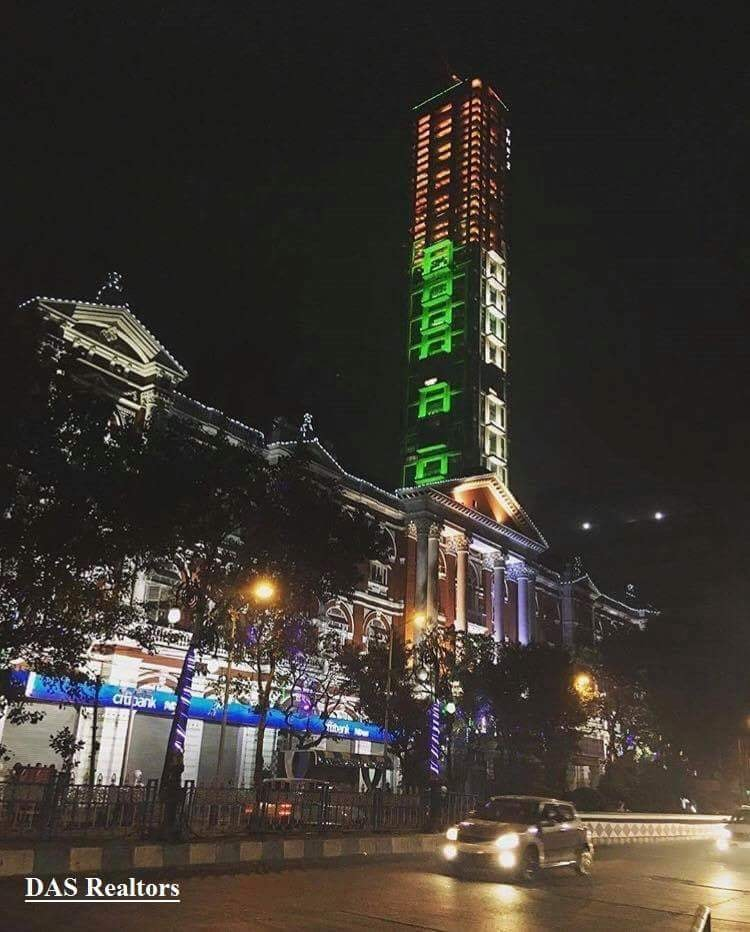
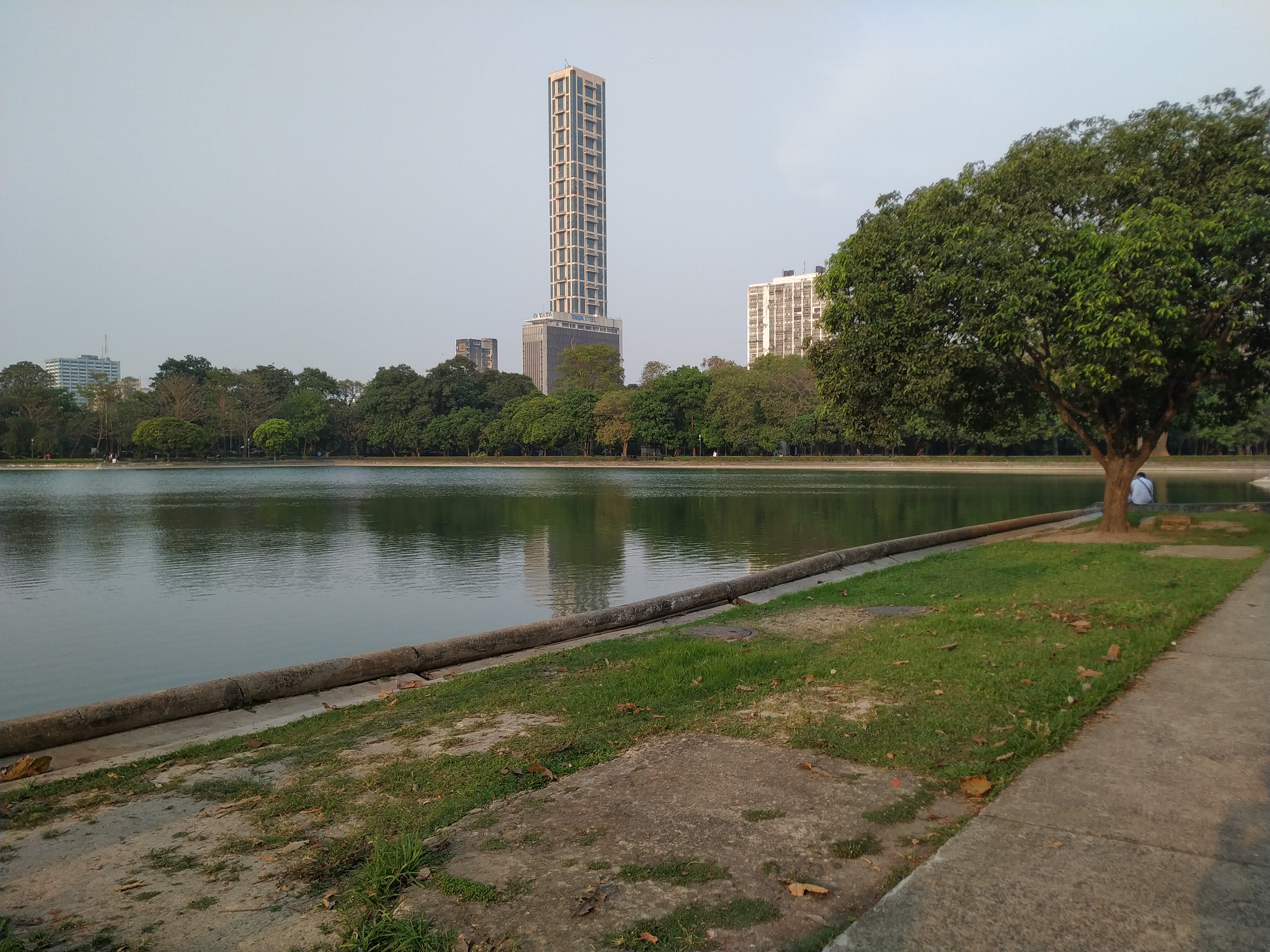
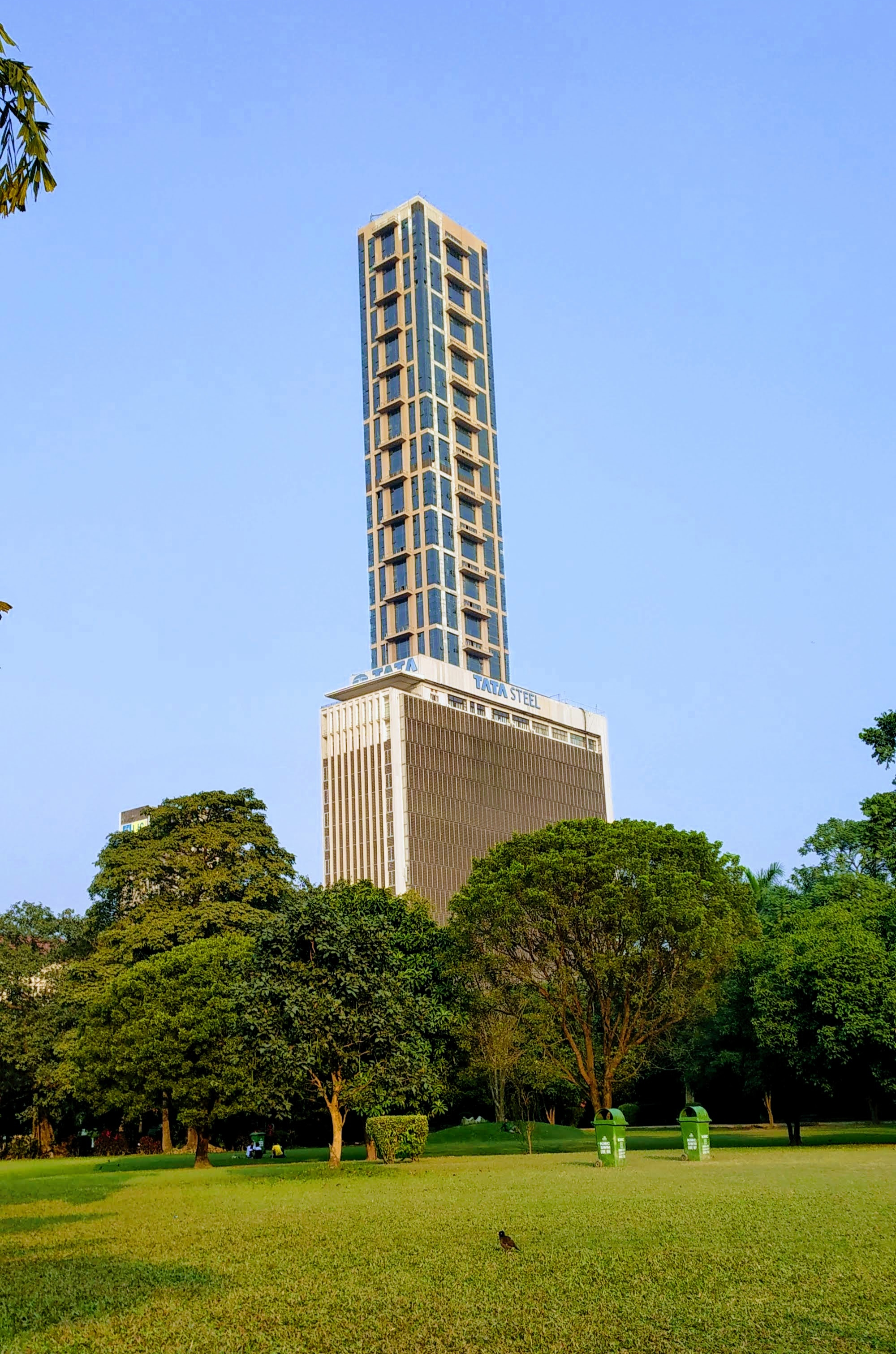
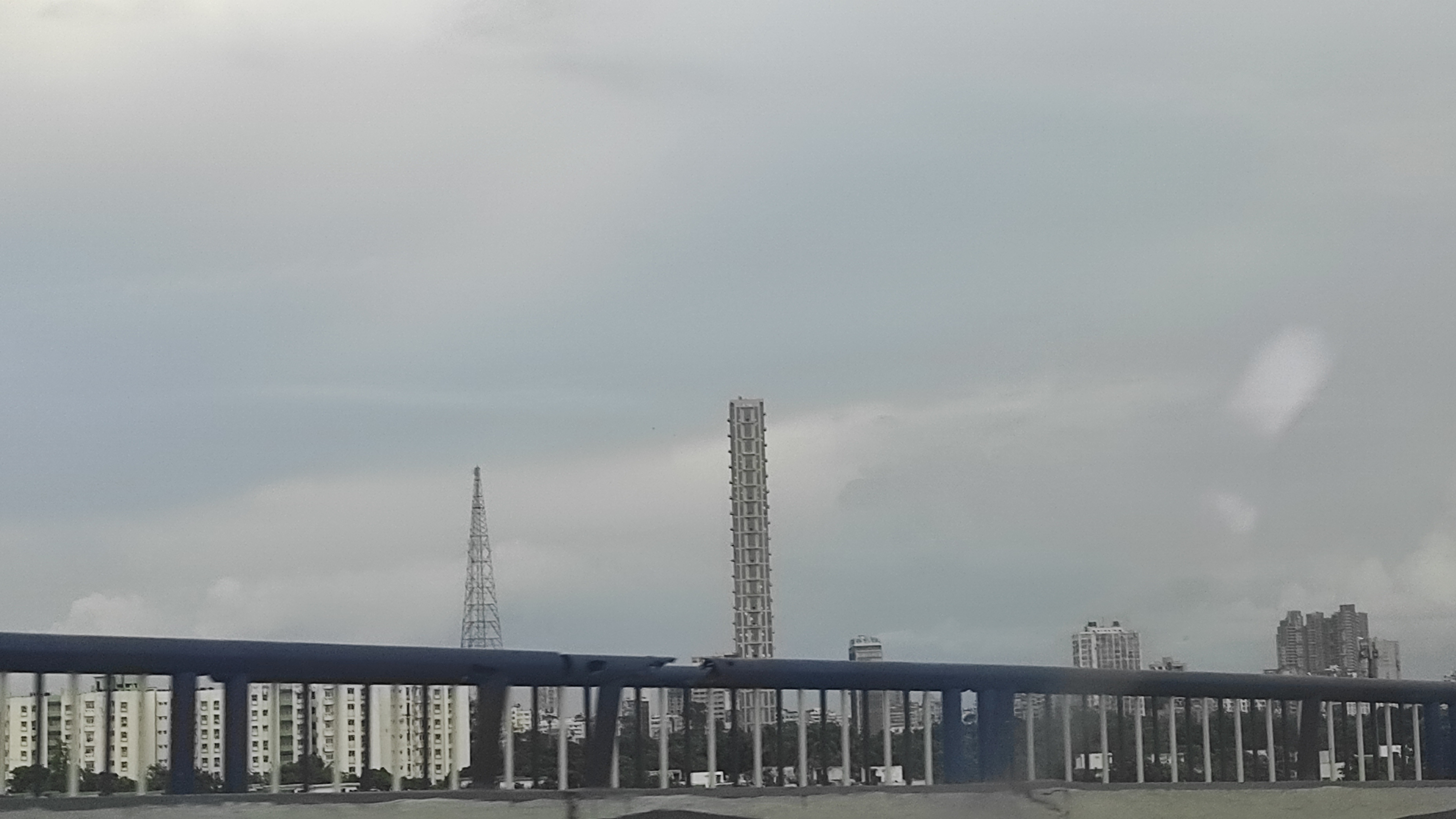
The 42, is coming up in between Jeevan Sudha and Tata Centre buildings - August 2016
The 42, under construction, seen from a distance - August 2016
The 42, Kolkata, under construction, 2017
The 42, close view - August 2017
The 42, Kolkata, under construction, 2018
The 42, illuminated in the colours of the Indian Tricolour in commemoration of Independence Day, 2019
The 42, on Independence Day 2019
The 42, as seen from Victoria Memorial's Garden - April 2022
The 42, on a bright sunny day
The 42, as seen from Howrah

== See also ==
- List of tallest buildings in India
- List of tallest buildings in Kolkata
- List of tallest buildings and structures in the Indian subcontinent
- List of tallest structures in India
- List of tallest structures in the world
- List of tallest buildings in different cities in India
- List of tallest buildings in Asia
- List of tallest residential buildings
