= Everest House =

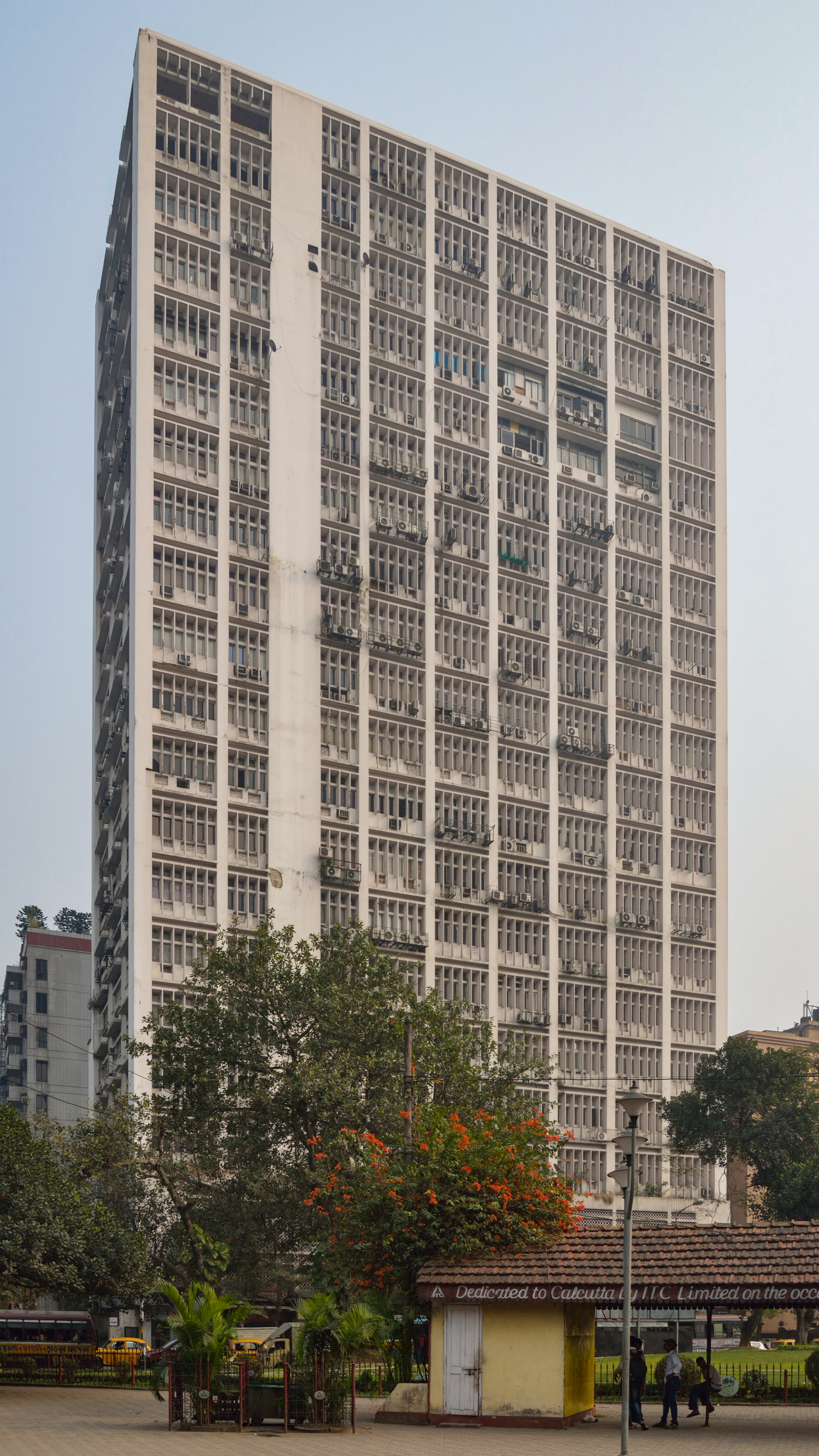

General information
- Status: Completed
- Location: Kolkata, India
- Coordinates: 22°32′47.68″N 88°20′45.84″E
- Height: 84 metres (276 ft)

Technical details
- Floor count: 21

Everest House is a high-rise commercial building located on Chowringhee Road in Kolkata, India. It was completed in 1978, it reaches a height of 84 m (276 ft), making it the second‑tallest building in the city’s central business district after Chatterjee International Center after its inauguration.

== History ==
The Everest House was commissioned in the mid‑1970s by an independent developer to meet rising demand for premium office space in Kolkata’s Central Business District. Construction was completed in 1978, and Everest House immediately became one of the city’s tallest landmarks, overtaken only by Tata Centre (completed 1967) and Chatterjee International Center (1976). For over four decades, it dominated the skyline until April 2019, when the 268 m "The 42" complex surpassed it as India’s tallest building and dwarfed Everest House along with other longstanding high‑rises.

== Architecture ==
Everest House is the second tallest building in the central business district of the city after Chatterjee International Center. Built in 1978, the building has a total height of 84 metres (276 ft) and 21 floors. The building houses numerous offices, while the ground floor consists of showrooms. Everest House features a reinforced‑concrete frame with a curtain‑wall facade of tinted glass and metal panels. The building’s engineering reflects late‑modernist trends of the 1970s, emphasizing function and efficient use of space over ornamentation.

The tower accommodates a mix of corporate offices (104 offices), law firms, and showrooms. Typical tenants include financial services companies, consulting firms, and technology providers. The ground floor is leased to retail and hospitality outlets. Average area of Office floor plate is 1,600 m² (≈ 17,200 sq ft).

== See also ==
- List of tallest buildings in Kolkata
