= Government of India Building =

GOI Building

General information
- Status: Completed
- Location: Kolkata, India
- Height: 74 metres (243 ft)

Technical details
- Floor count: 20

Design and construction
- Developer: Government of India

GOI Building (Also known as Government of India Building) is a high-rise located in Kolkata, India. It is located on Acharya Jagadish Chandra Bose Road. It is one of the tallest buildings in Kolkata.

== Details ==
The GOI Building is one of the most important buildings in Kolkata. Built in 1978 inside the Nizam Complex by the Government of India, it is a commercial building and has a total of 20 floors. It houses numerous Government of India offices like CBI, FCI and so on.

== See also ==
- List of tallest buildings in Kolkata
