= Industry House, Kolkata =

Industry House

General information
- Status: Completed
- Location: Kolkata, India
- Height: 77 metres (253 ft)

Technical details
- Floor count: 20

Design and construction
- Developer: Birla Group

Industry House is a high-rise located in Kolkata, India. It is located in the central part of the city beside Camac Street.

== Details ==
Industry House is one of the earliest high-rises in the city. It is a commercial building and was built in 1980 by the Birlas. This modern building has a total height of 77 metres (253 ft). The building houses numerous offices, most of them of Birla Group companies.

== See also ==
- List of tallest buildings in Kolkata
