= Uniworld City =

Housing complex in Kolkata, India

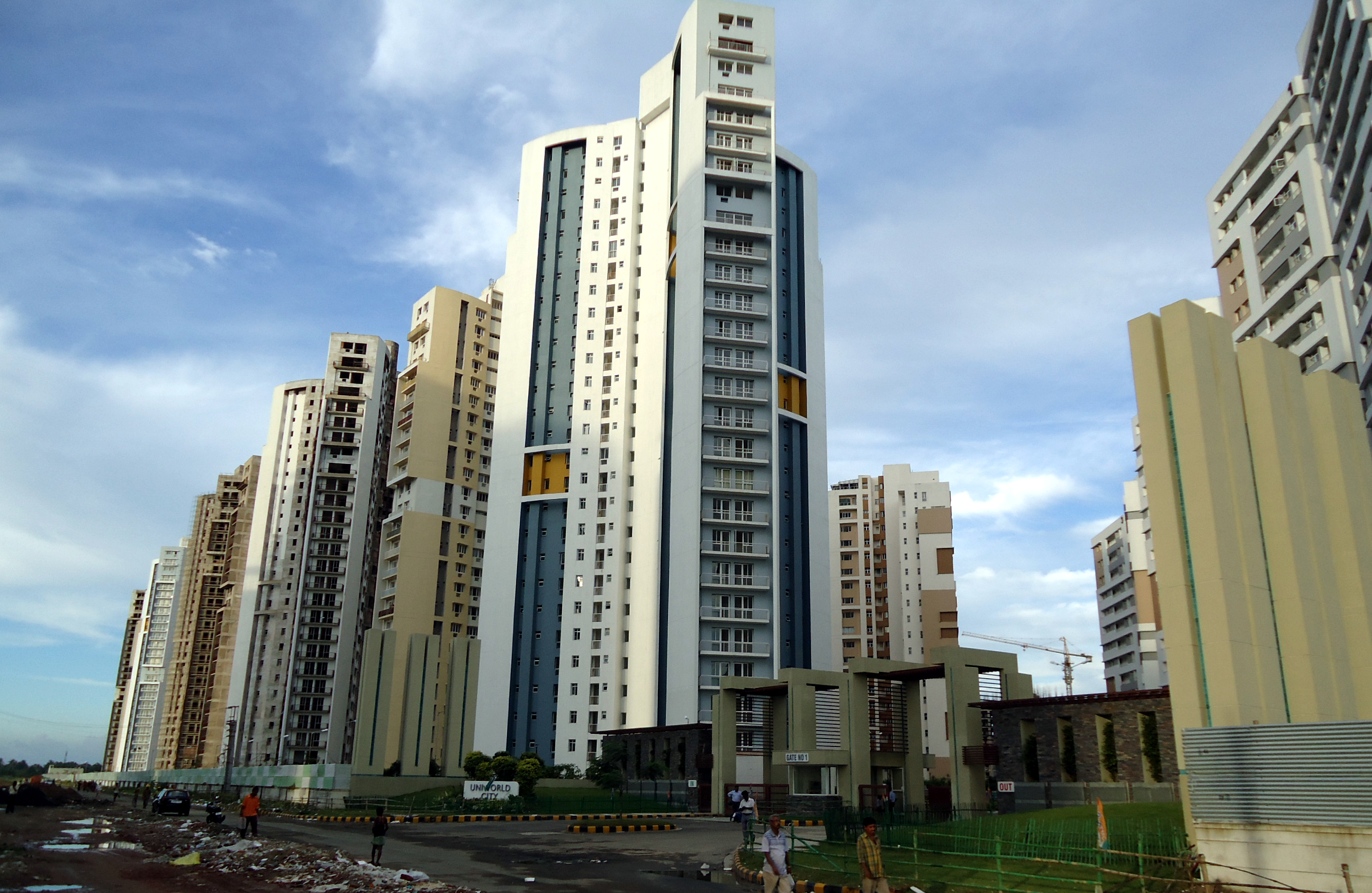
- Uniworld City skyline

General information
- Location: New Town, Kolkata
- Area: 100 acres (40 ha)

Uniworld City is a residential housing complex in New Town, Kolkata in the Indian state of West Bengal. The project is developed by Unitech Group, a real estate company in India.

== The city ==
=== Locality ===
The housing complex is located in the New Town Action Area III. As of 2017, there were more than 800 families residing in it. Uniworld City has well-planned urban atmosphere like wide-open roads, beautiful sizeable apartments, parks and playgrounds and shopping malls. Downtown Mall is such a hypermarket which also includes a PVR multiplex. A modern clubhouse with gym & pool, outdoor and indoor sporting facilities, kids play areas & shopping areas are all operational within the township. The housing complex has easy access to Tata Medical Center and Ohio Hospital. Local nearby schools include DPS NewTown, DPS Megacity and New Town School. There are several 5-star and 4-star hotels like the Pride hotel, Novotel and the Westin. New Town IT hub is located nearby which is the second largest IT hub of West Bengal.

=== Residential apartments ===
The project had nine residential phases in this township namely, Air, Harmony, Horizon, Gardens, Heights, Cascades, Downtown, Vistas and Fresco. Along with 2000 homes, the complex has residential mini complexes like Unitech Air (40 storey), Unitech Universal Downtown (4 towers ranging from 14 to 24 storey) and Unitech Heights (10 towers ranging from 14 storey to 23 storey).

=== Transport ===
The city is nearby access to Netaji Subhas Chandra Bose International Airport and Dum Dum railway station. Also Newtown metro station is nearby metro station which is under construction.

== See also ==
- List of tallest buildings in Kolkata
