= Tata Centre =

High-rise building in Kolkata, India

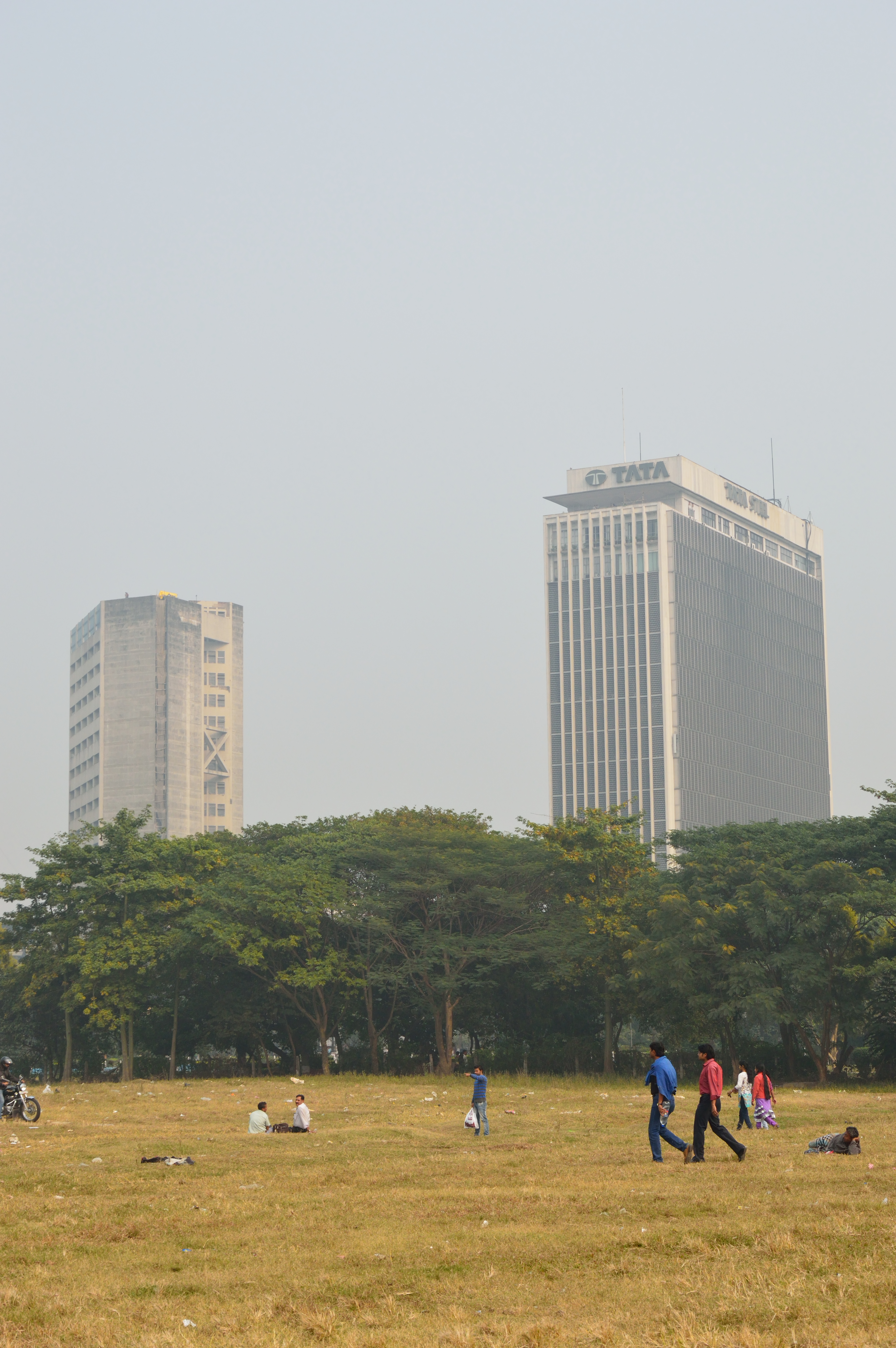
- Tata Centre (right) as viewed from the Brigade Parade Ground

Record height
- Tallest in East and Northeast India from 1963 to 1976^{[I]}
- Surpassed by: Chatterjee International Center

General information
- Type: Commercial offices
- Architectural style: Modernism (RCC-framed construction)
- Location: Chowringhee Road, Kolkata, India, 43 J. L. Nehru Road, Kolkata, West Bengal, India
- Coordinates: 22.5478128°N 88.3488373°E
- Completed: 1963; 63 years ago
- Inaugurated: 1963; 63 years ago
- Owner: Tata Group

Height
- Roof: 79 metres (259 ft)

Technical details
- Floor count: 18

Design and construction
- Architect: Utopian Associates
- Developer: Tata Group

Tata Centre is a high-rise commercial building located on Chowringhee Road in the central business district (CBD) of Kolkata, West Bengal, India. Completed in 1963, the building serves as the regional headquarters for several companies of the Tata Group.

== History ==
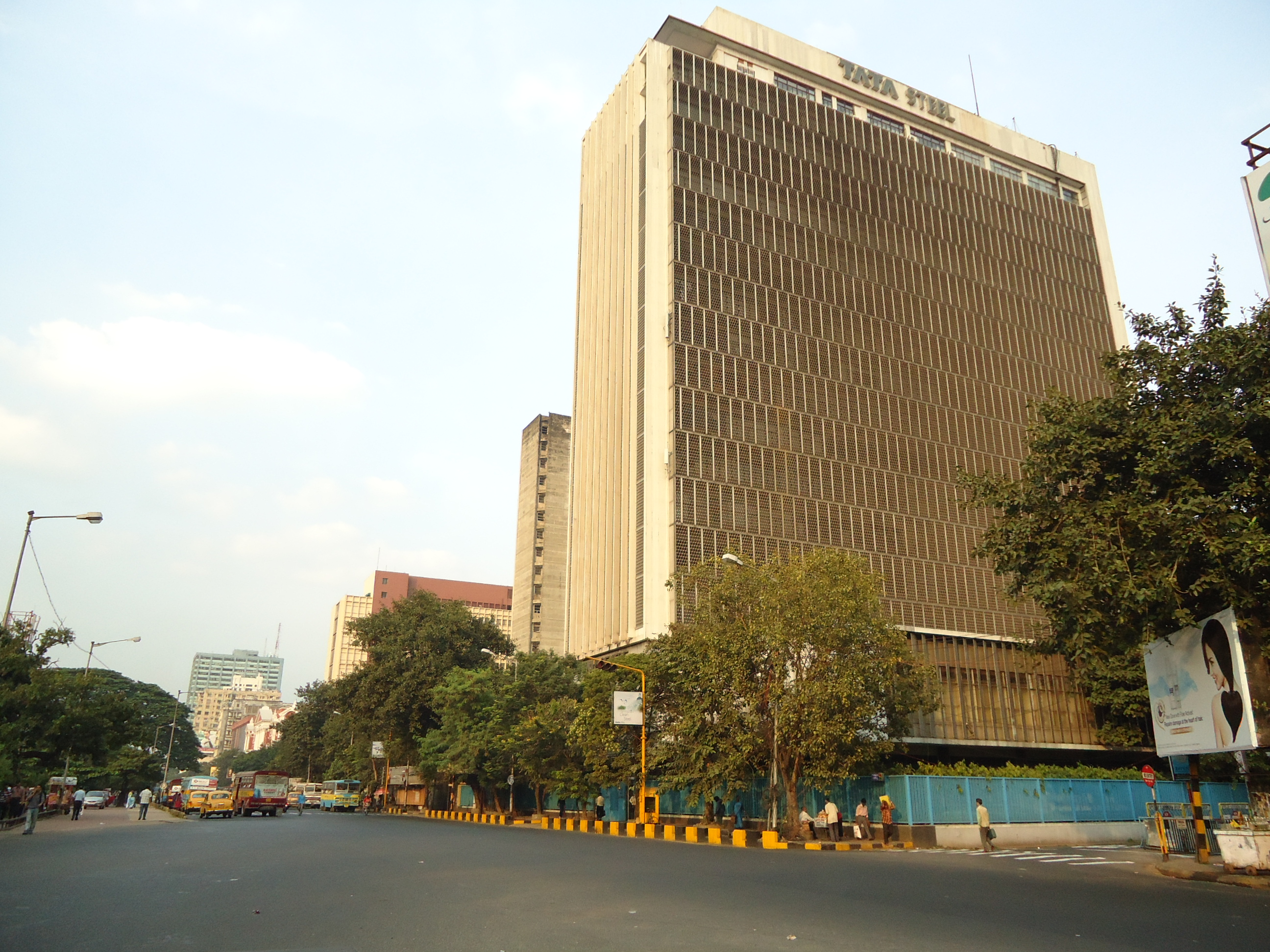
View of Tata Centre along Chowringhee Road

Tata Centre building as seen from the Chowringhee Road junction, 2015

Tata Centre was constructed in the early 1960s and inaugurated in 1963 as the flagship office of the Tata Group in eastern India. At the time of its completion, it was the tallest building in Kolkata, surpassing earlier colonial-era structures and marking a shift toward vertical development in the city.

The building held this distinction until 1976, when it was overtaken by the 24-storey Chatterjee International Center.

== Architecture and design ==
The structure was designed by Utopian Associates and reflects early modernist architectural trends. It features a reinforced concrete (RCC) frame, curtain wall glazing, and integrated steel elements. Tata Centre consists of 18 storeys and includes central air-conditioning, seven passenger elevators, an underground parking facility, and a BSNL telephone exchange.

== Location and urban context ==
Tata Centre is situated on Chowringhee Road in central Kolkata, within the city’s designated CBD. This area is home to numerous financial institutions, corporate headquarters, and government offices.

Surrounding high-rise buildings include Everest House (1978), Jeevan Sudha (1986), and Chatterjee International Center, forming a cluster of commercial towers along the Chowringhee corridor.

== Tenants and occupancy ==
The building functions as the eastern regional headquarters of various Tata Group companies. These include Tata Steel (Marketing), Tata Metaliks, Tata Pigments, Tata Sponge, Tata International, TELCON, and Tata Mutual Fund.

According to the West Bengal Labour Commissionerate, Tata Steel Ltd. at Tata Centre employs 656 permanent employees and over 250 contractual staff.

== Structural details ==
Structural and Technical Specifications
Feature	Detail
Height	79 m (259 ft)
Floors	18 (above ground)
Elevators	7 passenger lifts
HVAC	Central air conditioning system
Parking	Underground car park
Frame	RCC with curtain glass wall
Communications	Integrated BSNL telephone exchange

These technical facilities made Tata Centre one of the most technologically advanced commercial towers of its era.

== Transport and accessibility ==
The building is accessible via several modes of public transportation. It is located within walking distance of the Maidan, Esplanade, and Park Street metro stations.

Multiple bus routes, taxis, and auto-rickshaws operate along Chowringhee Road. Sealdah railway station, a major suburban and regional rail hub, is approximately 15 minutes away by road.

== Cultural and urban impact ==
Tata Centre has been cited in academic studies and media as a symbol of Kolkata’s post-independence urban evolution. The building’s completion marked a transition from colonial-era architecture to modern commercial development in the city.

== See also ==
- List of tallest buildings in Kolkata
- Chatterjee International Center
- Everest House (Kolkata)
- Jeevan Sudha
- Tata Group
