= South City (disambiguation) =

South City is a micro-township in Kolkata, India.

South City may also refer to:

- South City Mall, the largest shopping mall in East India, located in Kolkata
- South San Francisco, California
