= Calcutta Riverside =

Township in West Bengal, India

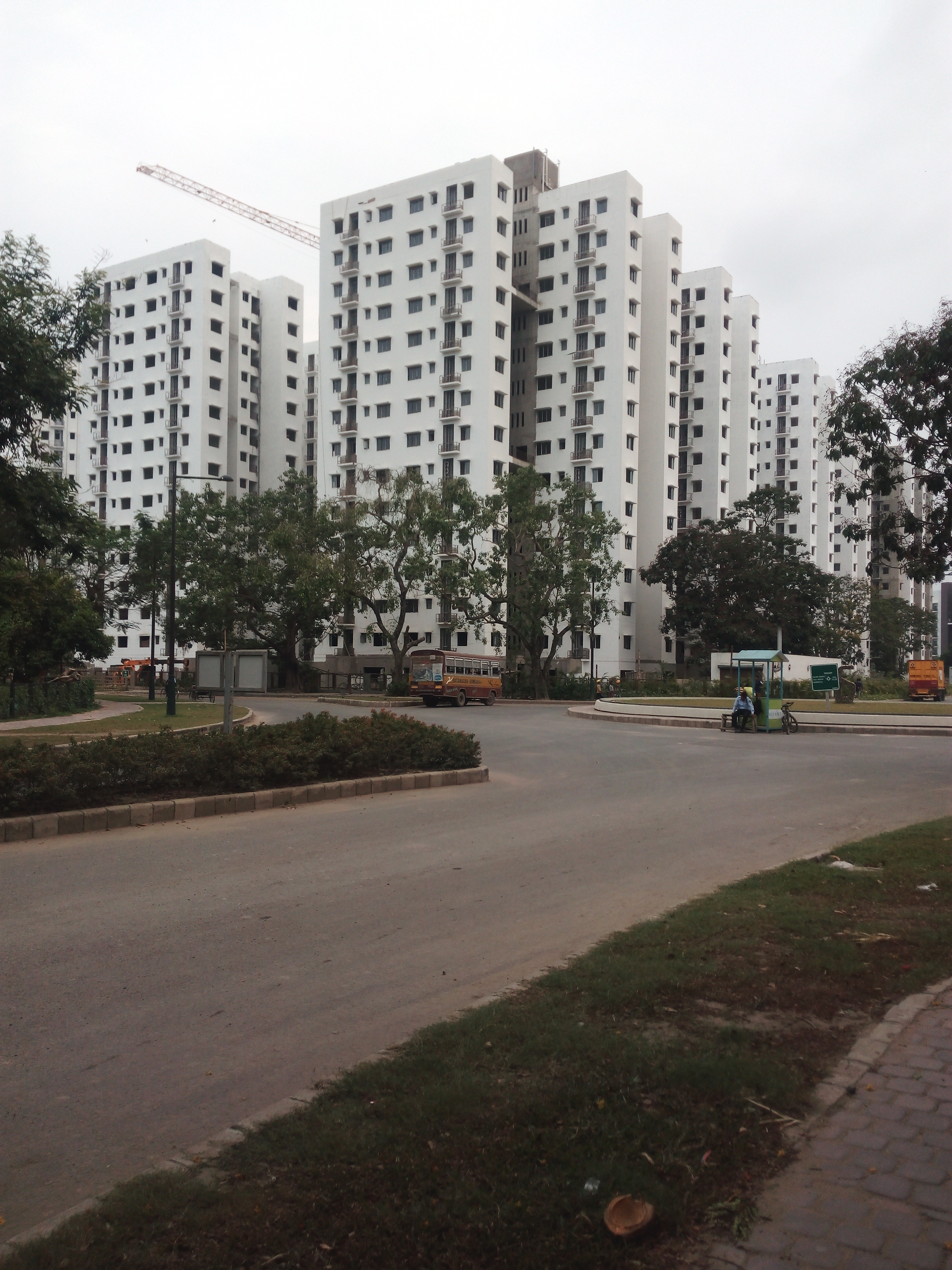
- Calcutta Riverside of Calcutta Riverside

Project
- Construction cost: ₹1,200 crore (estimated)
- Status: In progress
- Developer: Riverbank Developers Pvt. Ltd. Bata India Limited
- Website: www.calcuttariverside.com

Location
- Township development
- Interactive map of Calcutta Riverside
- Coordinates: 22.5103°N 88.2238°E
- Country: India
- State: West Bengal
- Municipality: Batanagar
- District: South 24 Parganas district

Area
  - Total: 262 ha (650 acres)

Calcutta Riverside is a satellite township development across 106 hectares (262 acres) being developed by Riverbank Developers Pvt. Ltd. in joint venture with Bata India Limited planned on the banks of the Hooghly River in Greater Kolkata. The planned township falls in Batanagar in South 24 Parganas district, India. Riverbank Holdings, the operating company, has finalised a funding of Rs 117.60 crore for the IT SEZ portion of this project on the outskirts of Kolkata.

Yatra Capital Ltd will invest the funds in the IT SEZ component of the Calcutta Riverside project in lieu of 50 per cent equity stake in the SEZ. Spread over 10 hectares (25 acres), the IT SEZ will have a built-up area of 21.92 lakh sq.ft. This is a joint venture of Riverbank Holdings Private Ltd. and Bata India Ltd and KMDA. .

Calcutta Riverside is a mixed-use development with high-end residential communities around river, golf course and lakes. It has amenities including an IT park within 10-hectare (25-acre) SEZ, a ‘Crowne Plaza’ 200-room hotel with 50 service apartments overlooking the river, a retail mall with Big Bazaar and Hometown anchors by Future Group, a multi-specialty hospital with diagnostic center, a school, a 9-hole golf course, a large sports and recreation club, an exclusive golf club; and a 700-metre-long riverfront promenade with fun retail and a marina.

The township has been designed with environmentally friendly design and onsite initiatives like the 10-hectare (25-acre) IT Park registered as a Green Building, retention of existing water bodies and recreation of more lined up with geo-textile blankets, retention of as much green cover as possible, offsite nursery development, zero sewage discharge, recycled water usage for irrigation and HVAC, use of sustainable building materials like bricks, concrete blocks etc. for the façade treatment, use of screens and shading devices, building envelopes around green courts, etc.

== The Project ==
Maradona pictured at Calcutta Riverside

=== Golf Greens-Golf Condominium ===
The project won the Global Awards In Association with CNBC Asia Pacific Properties Awards for Best Golf Development 2008

=== The Princep- Riverfront Housing ===
The project won the Global Awards In Association with CNBC Asia Pacific Properties Awards for Best Development 2008.

== Budget ==
With an estimated cost of ₹1,200 crore, Calcutta Riverside is a major development project in the region, comparable in scale to the 2,000-hectare (5,000-acre) Kolkata West International project developed by the Salim Group.

== Status ==
The existing Bata girls, boys and primary school will be upgraded and a separate school on 2.69-hectare (6.65-acre) and a 300-bed hospital will be built. Some of the trees abounding the estate have been cut down, says Dabriwal, but none that are old and deserve to be preserved, and the buildings, especially the central spine, has been designed around it.

The IT/industrial park and mall will generate employment. The 1.2 kilometre riverfront will be developed with recreation facilities for residents and visitors. Post completion, Calcutta Riverside will give employment to 30,570 people.
