= Chowringhee Road =

Road in Kolkata, India

Jawaharlal Nehru Road
- Former name: Chowringhee Road
- Maintained by: Kolkata Municipal Corporation
- Location: Kolkata, India
- Postal code: 700013, 700016, 700071, 700087
- Nearest Kolkata Metro station: Esplanade; Park Street; Maidan; Rabindra Sadan
- north end: Esplanade
- south end: Rabindra Sadan (Exide More)

Chowringhee Road (also spelt Chourangi Road), located in the Chowringhee neighbourhood of Kolkata, is the arterial road running from the eastern fringes of Esplanade southwards up to the crossing with Lower Circular Road (AJC Bose Road), in the city of Kolkata, West Bengal, India. It is the single most important road of the metropolis of Kolkata. It was officially renamed as Jawaharlal Nehru Road after Jawaharlal Nehru, India's first Prime Minister, but the original name Chowringhee Road is used commonly.

== History ==
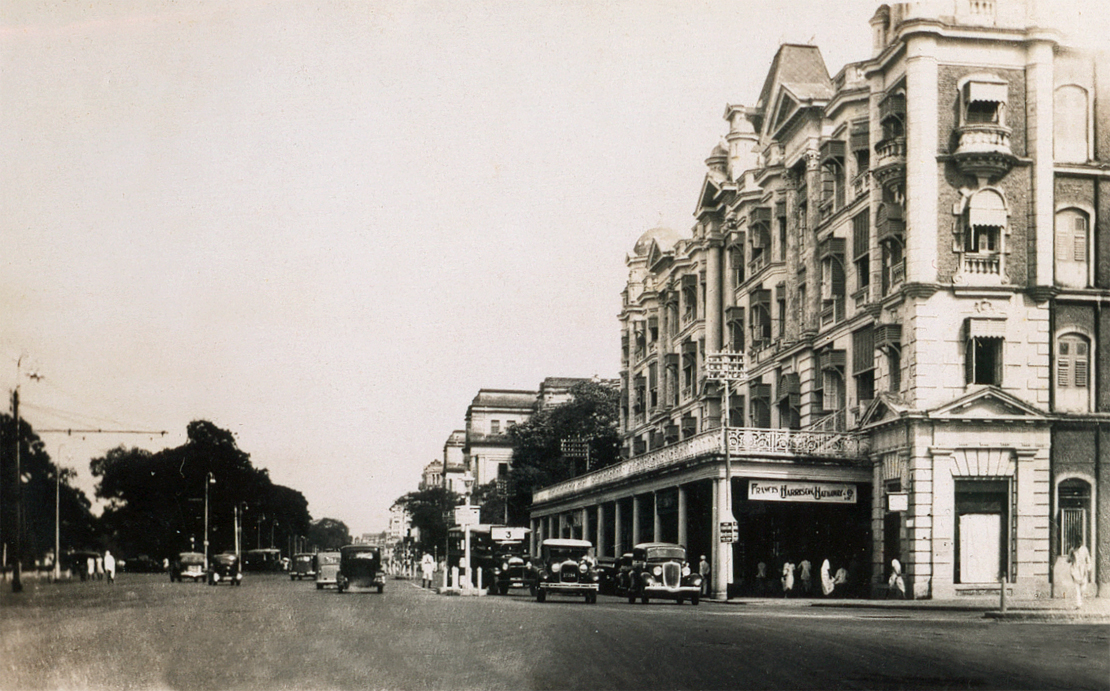
Chowringhee Road in the 1930s

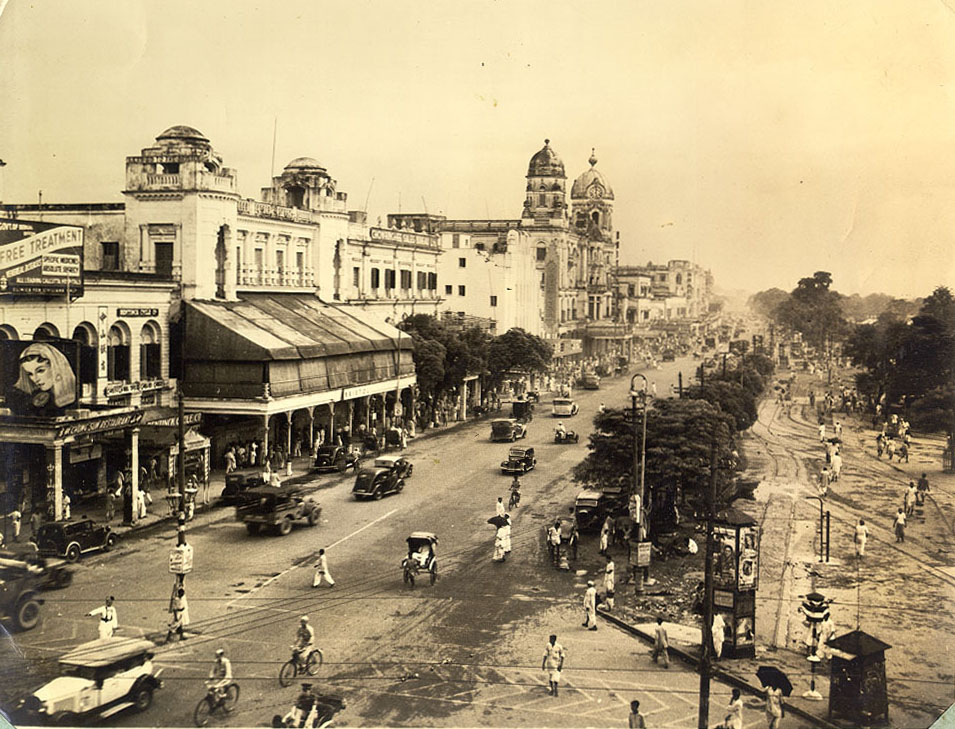
The road in 1945

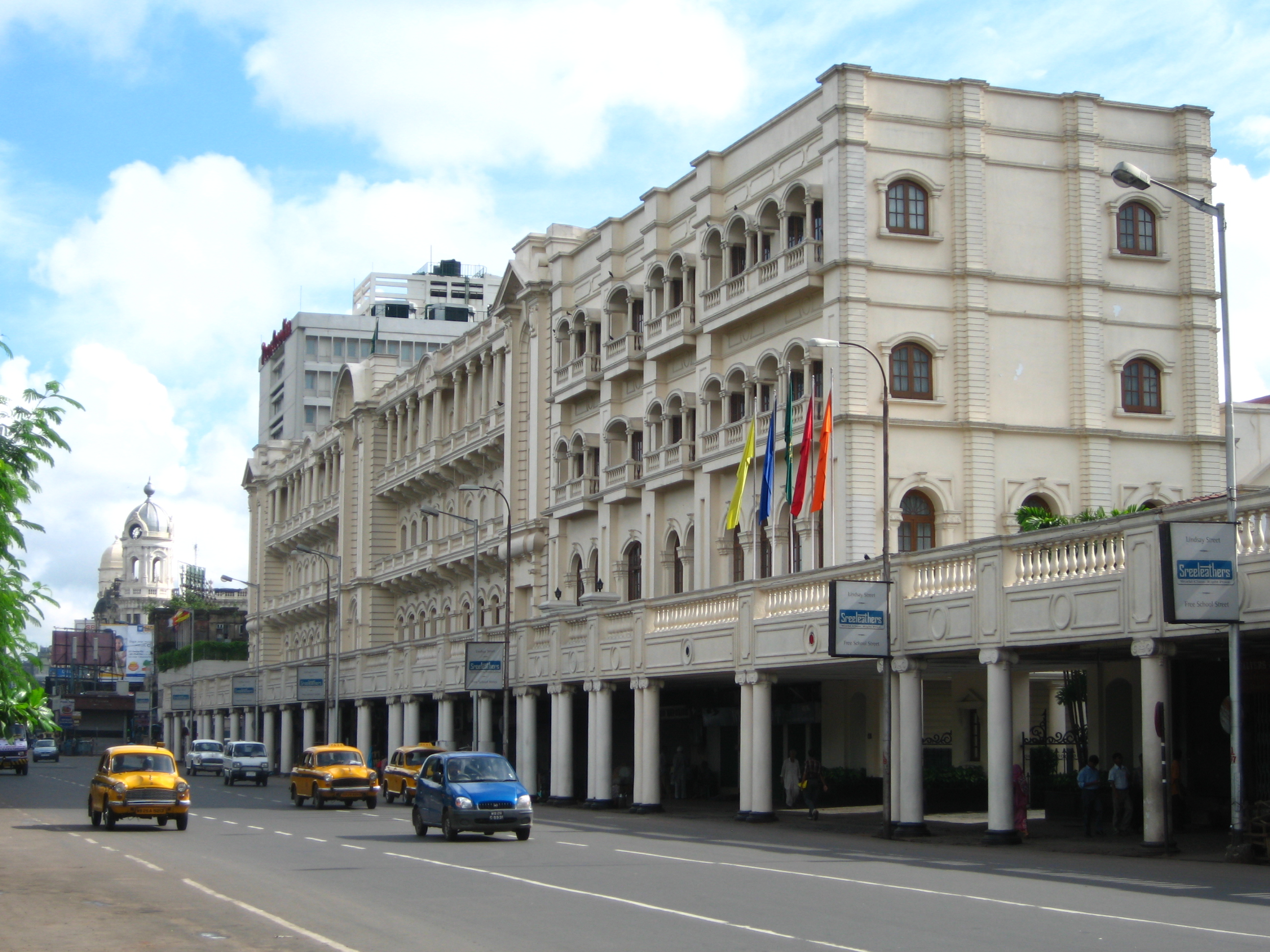
Oberoi Grand Hotel

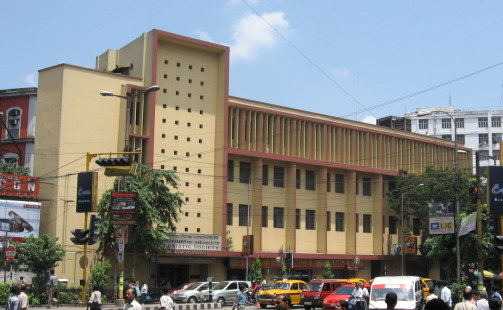
The Asiatic Society building

Kolkata Chowringhee Road

Arguably one of the first roads in the city, prior to the coming of the British, the road used to link the villages of Kalighat and Chowringhee. The village of Chowringhee was named after the hoary saint Chowranginath of the Nath sect of mystical Hinduism who had his 'dera' or camp over there, and the name stuck on in spite of the British rule and was changed after the independence of India during the rule of the Congress regime.

After the British started expanding their settlement outside the Fort area in the mid-18th century, the area around Chowringhee was one of the first expansions. And the same area remained their pride and commercial centre until their departure in 1947. During the early British developments around the Chowringhee area, they built huge bungalows and houses all along the eastern end of the road, thus earning Kolkata the sobriquet – 'City of Palaces'. It was a prosperous era of Kolkata, which came to be the second city of the British empire. Rows of huge palatial houses flanked by gardens and the area along the western edge of the road was a huge open area called the Maidan. The Maidan was intentionally kept open and development-free due to security purposes of Fort William.

Later there were tanks made on the western stretch of the road at each important crossing right from the Lower Circular Road junction (now the Exide crossing) to the Esplanade near Curzon Park. Of these only a couple exist now - the Manohar Das Tarag and the one at the junction of Park Street and Chowringhee. Of the reclaimed tanks, one was where the Calcutta Information Centre and the Maidan Police Station now stand, another one where the Maidan metro station now stands and still a third on where the Esplanade bus-terminus now stand. The beauty of the road no longer exists and can only be seen in drawings and sketches of the bygone era.

With the advent of trams, tram-tracks were laid along the western edge of Chowringhee to connect the southern areas of Tollygunge and Ballygunge to Esplanade. These tracks, also, no longer exist due to trams' slow speed and the advent of metro rail.

Of the grand palaces and mansions of the era, only a few still remain - "the Oberoi Grand Hotel", the "Janbazar" Building (which was owned by Rani Rashmoni) at the junction of Corporation Street (now S.N. Banerjee Road), "The Chowringhee Mansions" (now housing several offices) at Kyd Street intersection, the "Asiatic Society" at the Park Street crossing and the majestic "Indian Museum" are the well known ones. Some buildings from a later period include the "Kanak Building" (now housing offices of Citibank and Standered Chartered Bank) at the junction of Middleton Street, "Virginia House" (housing the headquarters of ITC) and the New Market Watch Tower building. The building at the Lindsay Street intersection, which used to house the famous Italian joint Firpo's, was razed in a blaze in 2002.

Chowringhee still remains very much the heart of Kolkata and the place of choice for many large business houses. This saying of old must have been followed by each architect who designed the newer buildings on Chowringhee, showcasing their extravagant self. Examples include the Tata Centre at the intersection of Harrington Street (now Ho Chi Minh Sarani), Jeevan Sudha (at the Middleton Street intersection), Everest House (next to Tata Center), J K Centre, SAIL Building, The Reliance House, the Metro Railway Building, among others. Chatterjee International Center is the tallest building situated on this road. It rises up to a height 91 metres (299 ft) from the ground and comprises 24 floors.

== Places of interest ==
Chowringhee Road is not only the commercial heart of the city, but also the cultural heart. The Indian Museum and the Government Art College are located here, along with the afore-mentioned The Asiatic Society. The Bishop's House, housing the residence of the Bishop of Kolkata and the St. Paul's Cathedral, is located here.

The M. P. Birla Planetarium is on the junction of Chowringhee Road and Cathedral road and the Victoria Memorial (on Queens Way) is a stone's throw away from here. The neo-cultural centres of Rabindra Sadan, Nandan and the Academy of Fine Arts are next to Chowringhee on Lower Circular Road and the Cathedral Road.

The Tipu Sultan Mosque is at the intersection of Chowringhee Road, Chittaranjan Avenue and Lenin Sarani (formerly Dharmotollah Street).

The huge expanse of the Maidan is busy throughout the year with fairs and political meetings.

== Gallery ==
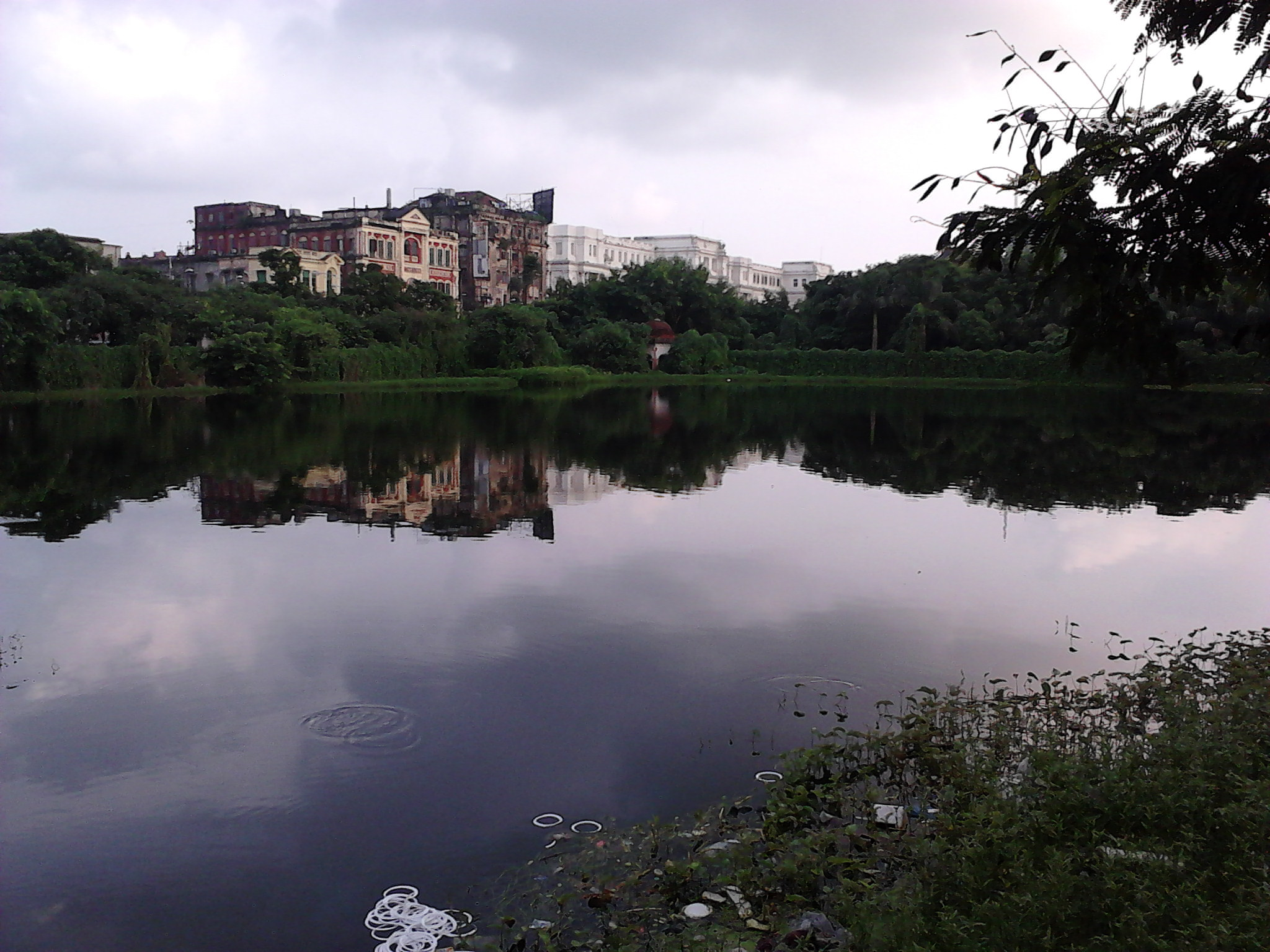
Manohar Das Tarag in 2011

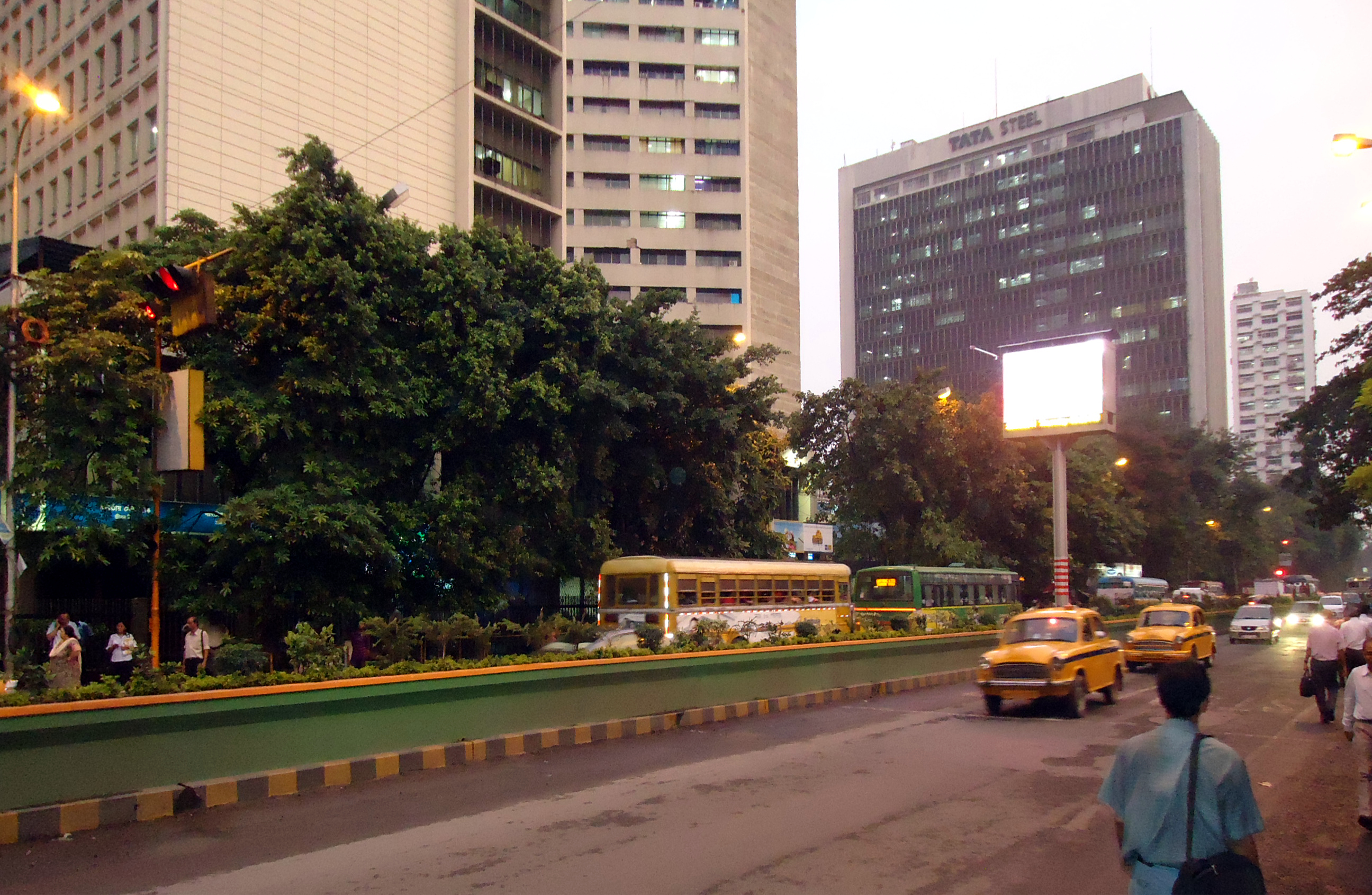
High rises

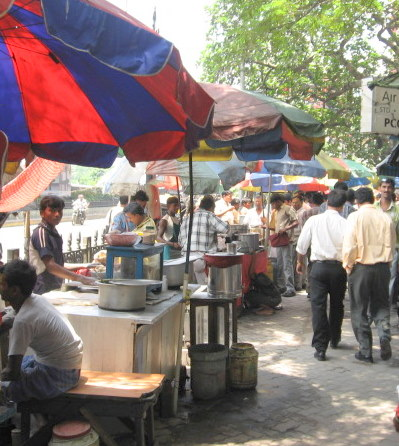
Eateries on a footpath in the area

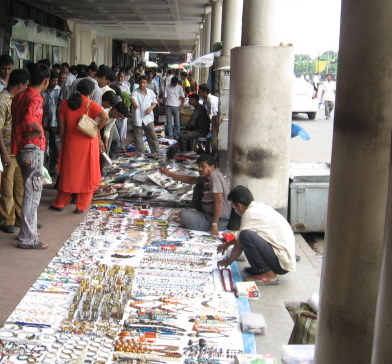
Hawkers do brisk business on pavement

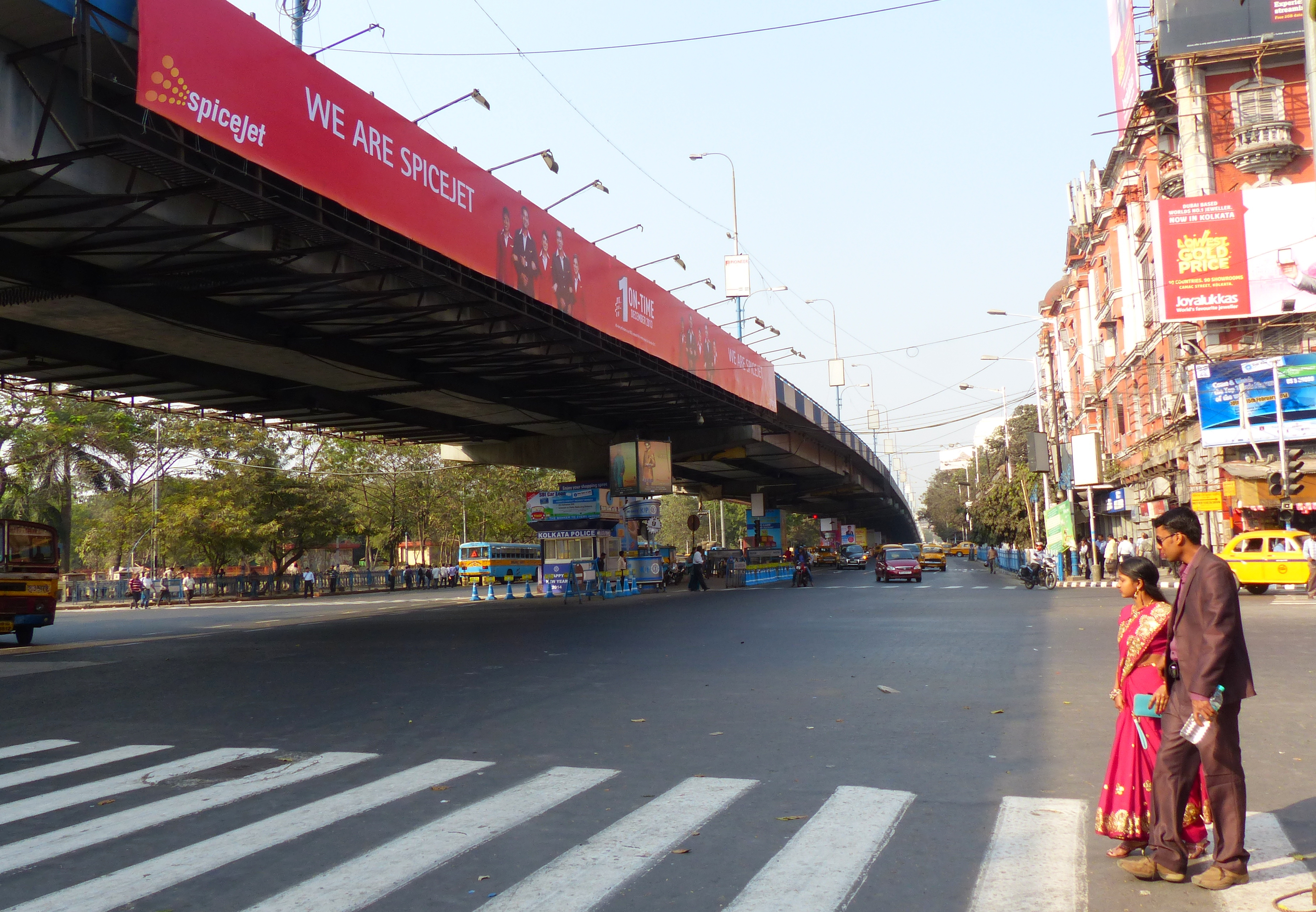
Park Street Flyover
