= List of tallest buildings in Kolkata =

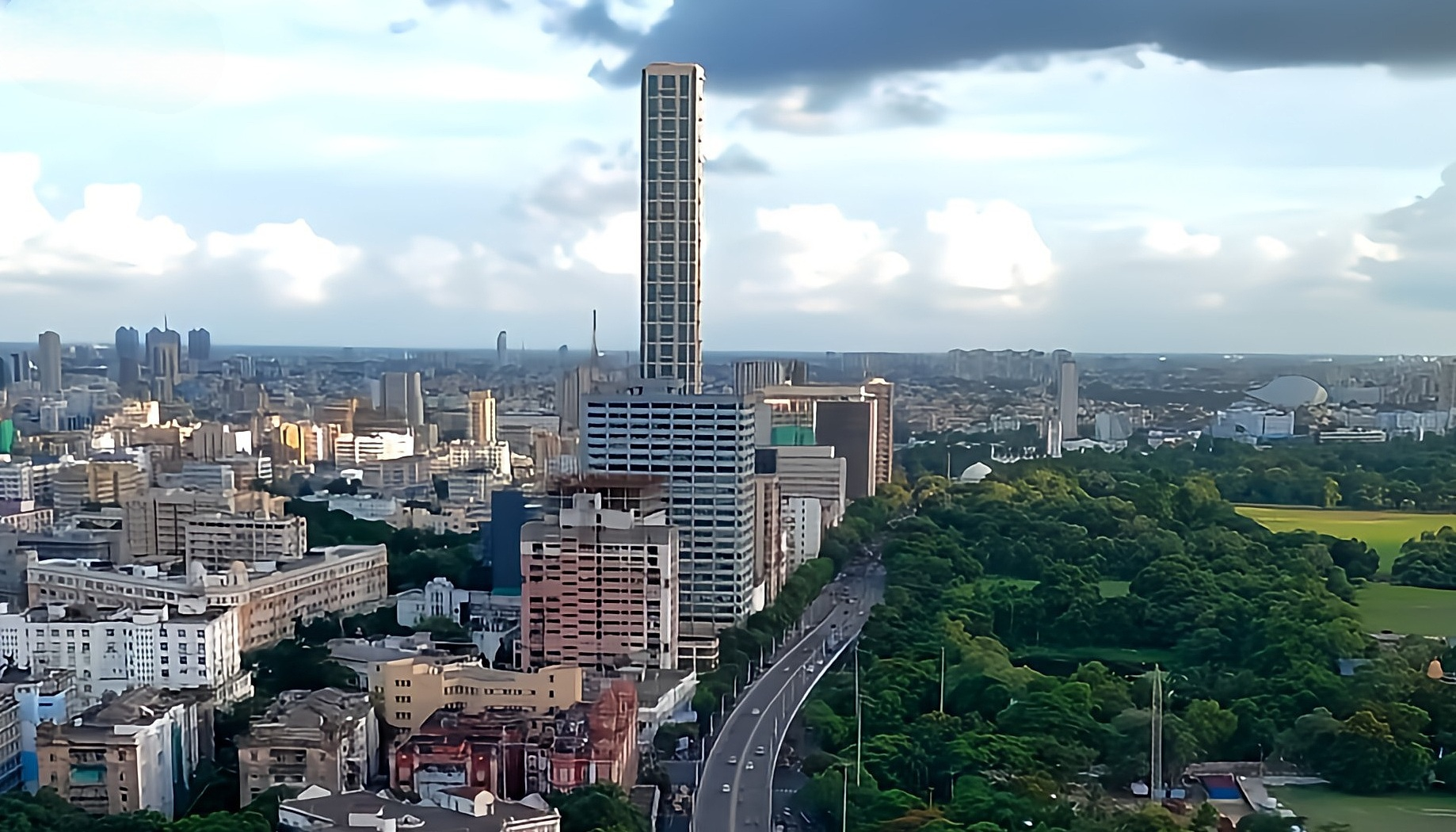
An Aerial view of Kolkata's Skyline.

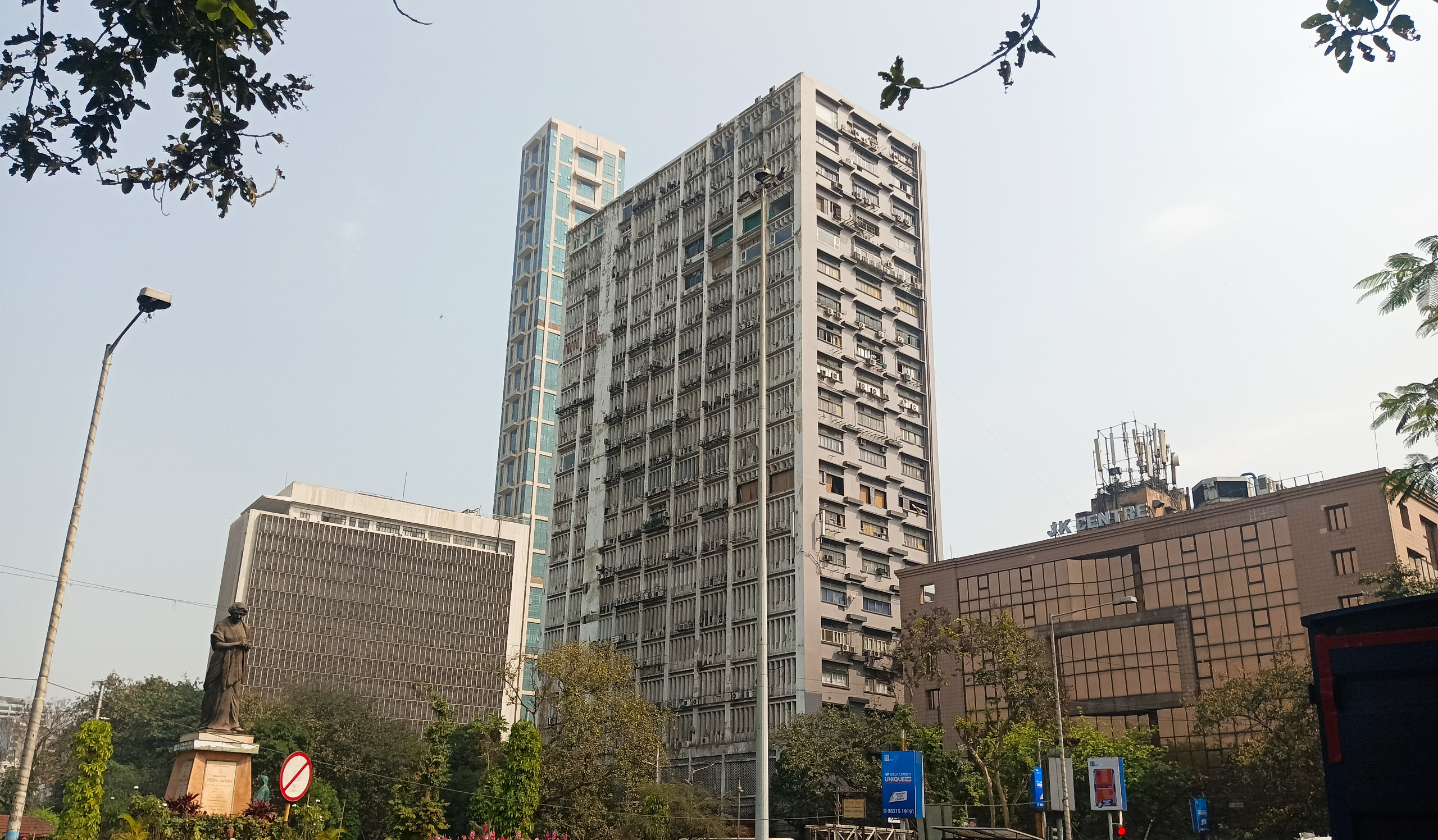
The Skyline of Kolkata's Central Business District in 2024 with The 42, Tata Centre and Everest House.

This list of tallest buildings in Kolkata enumerates high-rise buildings and skyscrapers in Kolkata and its metropolitan area. Kolkata is currently home to around 15 skyscrapers and more than 1,500 completed high-rise buildings, and many more high-rise buildings are under construction. The 42, which was completed in 2019, is currently the tallest building in Kolkata and the tallest completed building in India outside of Mumbai, with a height of 260 metres (853 ft) consisting of 65 floors.

== Overview ==
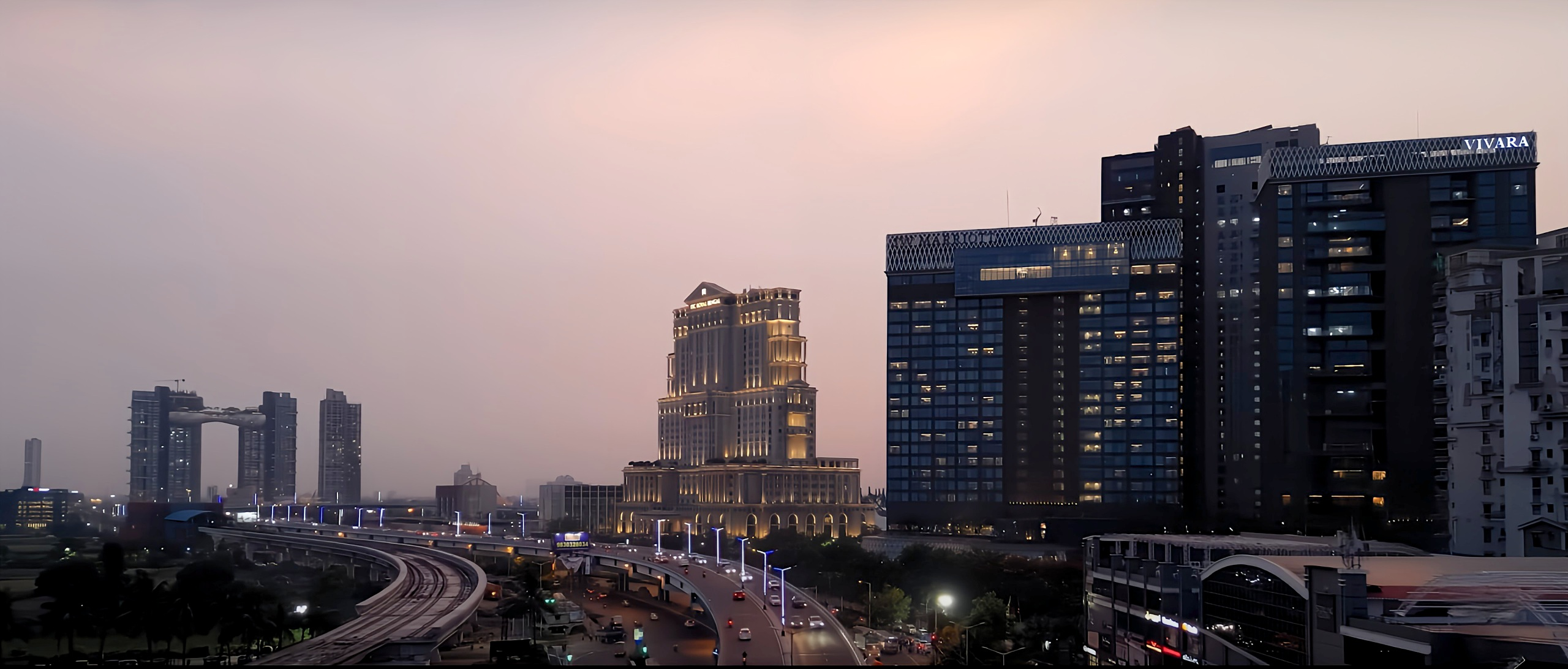
Skyline along E.M.Bypass, Kolkata.

Kolkata's high-rises are primarily concentrated in and around Chowringhee, which is the central business district of the city, EM Bypass area and Newtown-Rajarhat area. Tata Centre, the 18-storied building which was completed in 1963 was the city's first skyscraper at 79.2 metres (260 ft). When Chatterjee International Center (24 floors) was built in 1976, it became the tallest office building in the city and also the tallest of its type in all of Eastern India with a height of 91 metres (299 ft). Everest House (21 floors) (84 metres (276 ft)), built in 1978, is also located in Chowringhee. Apart from the central business district, the region of B.B.D. Bagh and Babughat also have several high-rises. The Salt Lake City and Rajarhat New Town regions (which already have several high-rises) have undergone a massive construction boom, with hundreds of high-rises completed and under construction. The city got its first residential high-rise in 2004 when the 'Peak' block was opened in Hiland Park. It has 28 floors with a height of 86 metres (282 ft). This created a new idea of constructing residential high-rises in addition to office or commercial buildings. In 2008, South City Towers (36 floors), at a height of 117 metres (384 ft), were completed near Jodhpur Park in South Kolkata which became the first 100 metres (328 ft)-plus buildings of the city. Again in October 2013, Towers 2 and 6 of Urbana topped out at a height of 167.6 metres (550 ft) and 152.4 metres (500 ft), respectively and were the tallest buildings in the city until The 42 topped out in 2019 at a height of 260 metres (853 ft), becoming the tallest building in the city as well as in Eastern India. All these developments have changed the skyline of the city.

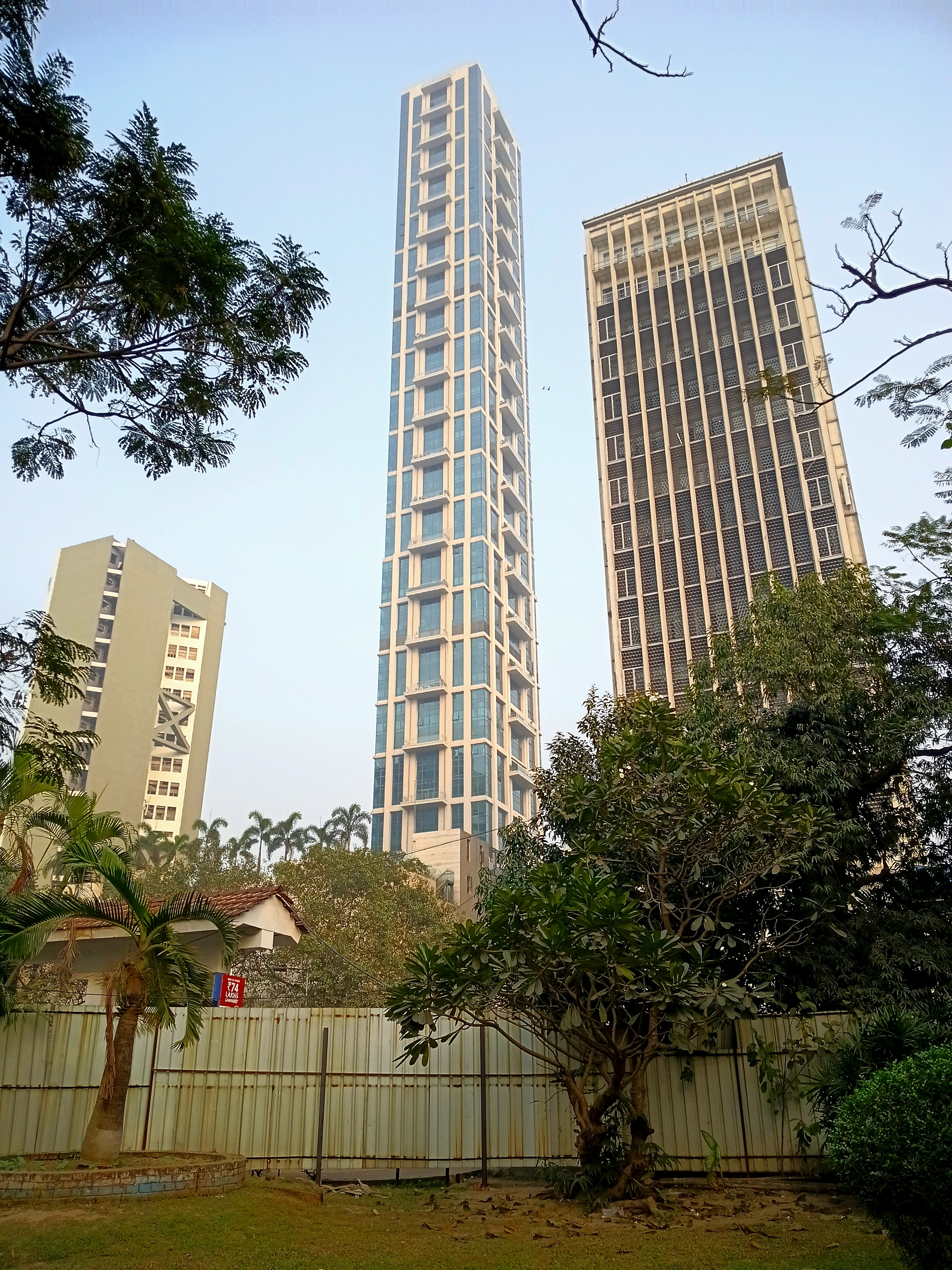
The 42 View from Elliott Park, Maidan

Currently Kolkata has around 69 completed high-rise buildings whose height is over 100 metres (328 ft) and many more high-rise buildings are under construction.

== Tallest buildings ==
This lists ranks buildings in Kolkata that stand at least 90 metres (295 ft), based on standard height measurement. This includes spires and architectural details but does not include antenna masts. Only completed buildings and under-construction buildings that have been topped out are included

Rank	Name	Image	Height	Floors	Year	Building type
1	The 42		260 metres (853 ft)	65	2019	Residential
2	Urbana 2		167.7 metres (550 ft)	46	2014	Residential
3	Urbana 3		167.7 metres (550 ft)	46	2015	Residential
4	Peerless Avidipta II HIG 'Platinum'		159.2 metres (522 ft)	47	2022	Residential
5	Peerless Avidipta II HIG 'Diamond'		159.2 metres (522 ft)	47	2022	Residential
6	Urbana 1		152.40 metres (500 ft)	41	2015	Residential
7	Urbana 4		152.40 metres (500 ft)	41	2015	Residential
8	Urbana 5		152.4 metres (500 ft)	41	2014	Residential
9	Urbana 6		152.4 metres (500 ft)	41	2013	Residential
10	Urbana 7		152.4 metres (500 ft)	41	2013	Residential
11	Forum Atmosphere 1		152 metres (499 ft)	39	2017	Residential
12	Forum Atmosphere 2		152 metres (499 ft)	39	2017	Residential
13	The Westin		150 metres (492 ft)	35	2013	Hotel
14	The V		150 metres (492 ft)	35	2013	Mixed Use
15	Tata 88 East		150 metres (492 ft)	43	2024	Residential
16	Urbana 8		147 metres (482 ft)	43	2025	Residential
17	Urbana 9		147 metres (482 ft)	43	2025	Residential
18	Urbana 10		147 metres (482 ft)	43	2025	Residential
19	Uniworld Air		145.10 metres (476 ft)	41	2014	Residential
20	Trump Tower Kolkata		144.60 metres (474 ft)	39	Residential	
21	PS Anassa		141 metres (463 ft)	37	2023	Residential
22	Siddha Sky 1		140.3 metres (460 ft)	35	2024	Residential
23	Siddha Sky 2		140.3 metres (460 ft)	35	2024	Residential
24	Siddha Sky 3		140.3 metres (460 ft)	35	2024	Residential
25	Meghmani		136 metres (446 ft)	39	2021	Residential
26	PS The Reserve		132 metres (433 ft)	35	2022	Residential
27	ITC Royal Bengal		128 metres (420 ft)	28	2016	Hotel
28	PS Aurus 1		127.5 metres (418 ft)	35	2021	Residential
29	Prasad Rare Earth 1		126 metres (413 ft)	36	2021	Residential
30	Prasad Rare Earth 2		126 metres (413 ft)	36	2021	Residential
31	Prasad Rare Earth 3		126 metres (413 ft)	36	2021	Residential
32	Prasad Rare Earth 4		126 metres (413 ft)	36	2021	Residential
33	Prasad Rare Earth 5		126 metres (413 ft)	36	2021	Residential
34	RSH Signature		125 metres (410 ft)	32	2020	Residential
35	PS Aurus 2		122.3 metres (401 ft)	34	2021	Residential
36	Mani Vista		122 metres (400 ft)	32	2024	Residential
37	Swarnamani Xana		119.4 metres (392 ft)	35	2022	Residential
38	Eden Z Residences		130 metres (427 ft)	34	2024	Residential
39	Swarnamani Zarina		118 metres (387 ft)	33	2022	Residential
40	South City Oak		117 metres (384 ft)	35	2008	Residential
41	South City Pine		117 metres (384 ft)	35	2008	Residential
42	South City Maple		117 metres (384 ft)	35	2008	Residential
43	South City Cedar		117 metres (384 ft)	35	2008	Residential
44	Mani Vivara		116 metres (381 ft)	30	2015	Mixed Use
45	DLF Newtown Heights Tower 'E'		112.1 metres (368 ft)	32	2012	Residential
46	Peerless Avidipta II LIG 'Silver'		110.3 metres (362 ft)	35	2022	Residential
47	JW Marriott		110 metres (361 ft)	25	2015	Hotel
48	Anantmani 1		108.6 metres (356 ft)	28	2017	Residential
49	Elita Garden Vista Tower 4		108.5 metres (356 ft)	30	2018	Residential
50	Elita Garden Vista Tower 5		108.5 metres (356 ft)	30	2018	Residential
51	Elita Garden Vista Tower 12		108.5 metres (356 ft)	30	2012	Residential
52	Elita Garden Vista Tower 13		108.5 metres (356 ft)	30	2012	Residential
53	Merlin Acropolis		106.75 metres (350 ft)	21	2018	Commercial
54	Alcove New Kolkata Prayag 2		106.4 metres (349 ft)	29	2020	Residential
55	Alcove New Kolkata Prayag 3		106.4 metres (349 ft)	29	2020	Residential
56	Alcove New Kolkata Prayag 4		106.4 metres (349 ft)	29	2020	Residential
57	PS Srijan Corporate Park Tower 1		106 metres (348 ft)	25	2015	Commercial
58	Primarc The Ramdulari		105.45 metres (346 ft)	27	2025	Residential
59	Imagine Tech Park		104.45 metres (343 ft)	25	2024	Commercial
60	Bel Air		104 metres (341 ft)	27	2013	Residential
61	Sri Avani		104 metres (341 ft)	28	2016	Residential
62	Alcove New Kolkata Prayag 6		103.4 metres (339 ft)	28	2020	Residential
63	Akankha Krishnachura 2		101.3 metres (332 ft)	28	2009	Residential
64	DLF Newtown Heights Tower 'D'		101.3 metres (332 ft)	28	2012	Residential
65	DLF Newtown Heights Tower 'F'		101.3 metres (332 ft)	28	2012	Residential
66	Tata Avenida Tower 'D'		100.9 metres (331 ft)	30	2019	Residential
67	Tata Avenida Tower 'E'		100.9 metres (331 ft)	30	2019	Residential
68	Altius 1		100.7 metres (330 ft)	28	2019	Residential
69	Altius 2		100.7 metres (330 ft)	28	2019	Residential
70	Tata Avenida Tower 'F'		99.8 metres (327 ft)	30	2019	Residential
71	Flora Fountain A		99 metres (325 ft)	27	2020	Residential
72	Flora Fountain B		99 metres (325 ft)	27	2020	Residential
73	Uniworld City Heights 2		98 metres (322 ft)	25	2010	Residential
74	Uniworld City Heights 4		98 metres (322 ft)	27	2010	Residential
75	Uniworld City Heights 6		98 metres (322 ft)	25	2010	Residential
76	Uniworld City Heights 7		98 metres (322 ft)	27	2010	Residential
77	Uniworld City Heights 8		98 metres (322 ft)	27	2010	Residential
78	Uniworld City Heights 10		98 metres (322 ft)	27	2010	Residential
79	Sunrise Heights		98 metres (322 ft)	27	2018	Residential
80	Tata Avenida Tower 'A'		98 metres (322 ft)	30	2019	Residential
81	Tata Avenida Tower 'B'		98 metres (322 ft)	30	2019	Residential
82	Tata Avenida Tower 'C'		98 metres (322 ft)	30	2019	Residential
83	South City Galaxy		96 metres (315 ft)	21	2016	Residential
84	Inia		95.7 metres (314 ft)	24	2018	Residential
85	Ideal Royale		95.65 metres (314 ft)	24	2022	Residential
86	Panache 6		94 metres (308 ft)	26	2019	Residential
87	Panache 1		94 metres (308 ft)	26	2019	Residential
88	Alcove New Kolkata Prayag 5		94.2 metres (309 ft)	26	2020	Residential
89	Ideal Lake View 3		94 metres (308 ft)	26	2017	Residential
90	Rosedale 1		94 metres (308 ft)	26	2010	Residential
91	Rosedale 2		94 metres (308 ft)	26	2010	Residential
92	Rosedale 3		94 metres (308 ft)	26	2010	Residential
93	Rosedale 4		94 metres (308 ft)	26	2010	Residential
94	Rosedale 5		94 metres (308 ft)	26	2010	Residential
95	Rosedale 6		94 metres (308 ft)	26	2010	Residential
96	Tata Avenida Tower 'G'		93.55 metres (307 ft)	27	2019	Residential
97	Swarnamani Cristana		93.3 metres (306 ft)	26	2015	Residential
98	Swarnamani Oriana		93.3 metres (306 ft)	26	2015	Residential
99	Merlin Cambridge		92 metres (302 ft)	26	2013	Residential
100	Chatterjee International Center		91 metres (299 ft)	24	1976	Commercial
101	Ideal Exotica Tower A		90.2 metres (296 ft)	22	2020	Residential
102	Panache 2		90 metres (295 ft)	26	2019	Residential
103	Tirumani		90 metres (295 ft)	21	2013	Residential
104	Uniworld City Heights 1		90 metres (295 ft)	27	2010	Residential
105	Uniworld City Heights 5		90 metres (295 ft)	25	2010	Residential
106	Uniworld City Heights 8		90 metres (295 ft)	27	2010	Residential
107	Uniworld City Heights 9		90 metres (295 ft)	25	2010	Residential
108	Ideal Heights 'Cumulus'		90 metres (295 ft)	25	2011	Residential
109	Ideal Heights 'Stratus'		90 metres (295 ft)	25	2011	Residential
110	Ideal Heights 'Nimbus'		90 metres (295 ft)	25	2011	Residential
111	Mani Kala		90 metres (295 ft)	23	2013	Residential
112	Alcove Gloria 1		90 metres (295 ft)	21	2014	Mixed Use
113	Alcove Gloria 2		90 metres (295 ft)	21	2014	Mixed Use
114	Alcove Regency 1		90 metres (295 ft)	21	2016	Residential
115	Alcove Regency 2		90 metres (295 ft)	21	2016	Residential
116	Alcove Tower 5, Diamond City South		90 metres (295 ft)	22	2016	Residential
117	Tata Eden Court 1		90 metres (295 ft)	23	2012	Residential
118	Tata Eden Court 2		90 metres (295 ft)	23	2012	Residential
119	Ambuja Utalika 1		90 metres (295 ft)	25	2019	Residential
120	Ambuja Utalika 2		90 metres (295 ft)	25	2019	Residential
121	Ambuja Utalika 3		90 metres (295 ft)	25	2019	Residential
122	Ambuja Utalika 4		90 metres (295 ft)	25	2020	Residential
123	Fort Oasis 1		90 metres (295 ft)	25	2011	Residential
124	Fort Oasis 2		90 metres (295 ft)	25	2011	Residential
125	Unitech Fresco 4		90 metres (295 ft)	25	2017	Residential
126	Unitech Fresco 5		90 metres (295 ft)	25	2019	Residential
127	Elita Garden Vista 1		90 metres (295 ft)	25	2011	Residential
128	Elita Garden Vista 2		90 metres (295 ft)	25	2011	Residential
129	Elita Garden Vista 3		90 metres (295 ft)	25	2011	Residential
130	Elita Garden Vista 9		90 metres (295 ft)	25	2018	Residential
131	Elita Garden Vista 10		90 metres (295 ft)	25	2018	Residential
132	Elita Garden Vista 11		90 metres (295 ft)	25	2018	Residential
133	Elita Garden Vista 14		90 metres (295 ft)	25	2011	Residential
134	Elita Garden Vista 15		90 metres (295 ft)	25	2011	Residential
135	Elita Garden Vista 16		90 metres (295 ft)	25	2011	Residential
136	Ideal Aqua View Block A		90 metres (295 ft)	26	2022	Residential
137	Ideal Aqua View Block B		90 metres (295 ft)	26	2022	Residential
138	Ideal Aqua View Block C		90 metres (295 ft)	26	2022	Residential
139	Ideal Aqua View Block D		90 metres (295 ft)	26	2022	Residential
140	Ideal Aqua View Block G		90 metres (295 ft)	26	2022	Residential

== Tallest under construction ==
This lists buildings that are under construction in the city and are planned to rise at least 90 metres (295 ft). Buildings that are only approved, on-hold or proposed are not included in this table. Important note: due to the airport authority, some projects have been delayed and somewhere the heights have been reduced.

Name	Height	Floors	Expected year of completion	Building type
The Curve	194.95 metres (640 ft)	42	2028	Commercial
Ideal Unique Centre	167 metres (548 ft)	32	2021	Commercial
The 42 @ Middleton	164.28 metres (539 ft)	45	2027	Residential
Keventer One	155 metres (509 ft)	40	2031	Commercial
PS - Vinayak Numa T1	152.90 metres (502 ft)	43	2027	Residential
PS - Vinayak Numa T2	152.90 metres (502 ft)	43	2027	Residential
Srijan Palladina	115.40 metres (379 ft) (proposed 152.40 m)	31 (proposed 44)	2028	Residential
Orbit Emora	149.7 metres (491 ft)	36	2028	Residential
Arrjavv Nadia	148.55 metres (487 ft)	35	2027	Residential
PS Sansara 2	135.85 metres (446 ft)	45	2028	Residential
PS Sansara 3	135.85 metres (446 ft)	45	2029	Residential
PS Sansara 4	135.85 metres (446 ft)	45	2029	Residential
Ambuja Uddyatt	135 metres (443 ft)	32	2029	Residential
PS Sansara 1	129.25 metres (424 ft)	45	2029	Residential
PS Sansara 5	129.25 metres (424 ft)	45	2029	Residential
Siddha Sky Blu	122.10 metres (401 ft)	36		
Primarc Aadvika Tower A	122 metres (400 ft)	26	2030	Residential
Primarc Aadvika Tower B	122 metres (400 ft)	26	2030	Residential
Primarc Aadvika Tower C	122 metres (400 ft)	25	2030	Residential
PS Vaanya 1	121.21 metres (398 ft)	36	2027	Residential
PS Vaanya 2	121.21 metres (398 ft)	36	2027	Residential
PS Vaanya 3	121.21 metres (398 ft)	36	2027	Residential
PS Vaanya 4	121.21 metres (398 ft)	36	2027	Residential
Siddha Serena 1	120.83 metres (396 ft)	33		
Siddha Serena 2	120.83 metres (396 ft)	33		
Ambuja Utalika Panchami	120 metres (394 ft)	33		
Eden Devprayag T1	120 metres (394 ft)	35		
Eden Devprayag T2	120 metres (394 ft)	35		
Eden Devprayag T3	120 metres (394 ft)	35		
Eden Devprayag T4	120 metres (394 ft)	35		
Eden Devprayag T5	120 metres (394 ft)	35		
Sugam Niavara	119.95 metres (394 ft)	33		
Anantmani 2	116.1 metres (381 ft)	32		
Anantmani 3	116.1 metres (381 ft)	32		
Royal Ganges Tides T1	112.15 metres (368 ft)	36		
Royal Ganges Tides T2	112.15 metres (368 ft)	36		
Royal Ganges Tides T3	112.15 metres (368 ft)	36		
Royal Ganges Tides T4	112.15 metres (368 ft)	36		
Royal Ganges Tides T5	112.15 metres (368 ft)	36		
Royal Ganges Tides T6	112.15 metres (368 ft)	36		
Alcove Sangam 1	109.45 metres (359 ft)	30		
Alcove Sangam 2	109.45 metres (359 ft)	30		
Alcove Sangam 3	109.45 metres (359 ft)	30		
Alcove Sangam 5	109.45 metres (359 ft)	30		
Alcove Sangam 6	109.45 metres (359 ft)	30		
Alcove Sangam 7	109.45 metres (359 ft)	30		
Alcove Sangam 9	109.45 metres (359 ft)	30		
Belani Sanctuary T1	109.398 metres (359 ft)	30		
Belani Sanctuary T2	109.398 metres (359 ft)	30		
Belani Sanctuary T3	109.398 metres (359 ft)	30		
Belani Sanctuary T4	109.398 metres (359 ft)	30		
Merlin The Fourth 1	108.2 metres (355 ft)	28		
Merlin The Fourth 2	108.2 metres (355 ft)	28		
Merlin Niyasa	107.75 metres (354 ft)	29		
Orbit Sky Royale	107.7 metres (353 ft)	28		
Alcove Sangam 10	106.4 metres (349 ft)	29		
Alcove Sangam 11	106.4 metres (349 ft)	29		
Alcove Sangam 13	106.4 metres (349 ft)	29		
Alcove Sangam 14	106.4 metres (349 ft)	29		
Alcove Sangam 15	106.4 metres (349 ft)	29		
The Summit	106.1 metres (348 ft)	28		
Royal Ganges Tides T7	105.72 metres (347 ft)	30		
Royal Ganges Tides T8	105.72 metres (347 ft)	30		
Royal Ganges Tides T9	105.72 metres (347 ft)	30		
Royal Ganges Tides T10	105.72 metres (347 ft)	30		
Royal Ganges Tides T11	105.72 metres (347 ft)	30		
Royal Ganges Tides T12	105.72 metres (347 ft)	30		
Royal Ganges Tides T13	105.72 metres (347 ft)	30		
Royal Ganges Tides T14	105.72 metres (347 ft)	30		
Royal Ganges Tides T15	105.72 metres (347 ft)	30		
Royal Ganges Tides T16	105.72 metres (347 ft)	30		
Royal Ganges Tides T17	105.72 metres (347 ft)	30		
Royal Ganges Tides T18	105.72 metres (347 ft)	30		
Royal Ganges Tides T19	105.72 metres (347 ft)	30		
Royal Ganges Tides T20	105.72 metres (347 ft)	30		
Royal Ganges Tides T21	105.72 metres (347 ft)	30		
Royal Ganges Tides T22	105.72 metres (347 ft)	30		
Vinayak Vista	105.65 metres (347 ft)	24		
Shriji Cellesta 1	104.4 metres (343 ft)	32		
Shriji Cellesta 2	104.4 metres (343 ft)	32		
Usshar The Condoville T1	103.95 metres (341 ft)	32		
Usshar The Condoville T2	103.95 metres (341 ft)	32		
Usshar The Condoville T12	103.95 metres (341 ft)	32		
Alcove Sangam 16	103.35 metres (339 ft)	28		
Merlin Skygaze 1	102.8 metres (337 ft)	26		
Hiland Riverfront 2	94.2 metres (309 ft)	29		
Hiland Riverfront 1	94.075 metres (309 ft)	29		
Merlin Serenia T2	94 metres (308 ft)	28		
Merlin Serenia T3	94 metres (308 ft)	28		
Emami Business Bay	94 metres (308 ft)	22		
Park Unizen	93.8 metres (308 ft)	26		
The Varanda	93.7 metres (307 ft)	26		
Ideal Paradiso	92 metres (302 ft)	25		
Arya Altamount	90 metres (295 ft)	26		

== Approved, proposed and on-hold ==
This list ranks buildings that are proposed, on-hold and approved in the city. All the buildings listed below are slated to rise at least 90 metres (295 ft).

Name	Height	Floors	Status
KPC Global	190.8 metres (626 ft)	58	Proposed
Untitled Primarc - Hoogly Mills Project T6	98.48 metres (323 ft)	30	Proposed
Untitled Primarc - Hoogly Mills Project T3	98.48 metres (323 ft)	29	Proposed
Untitled Primarc - Hoogly Mills Project T4	98.48 metres (323 ft)	29	Proposed
Untitled Primarc - Hoogly Mills Project T5	98.48 metres (323 ft)	29	Proposed
Untitled Primarc - Hoogly Mills Project T1	98.48 metres (323 ft)	28	Proposed
Untitled Primarc - Hoogly Mills Project T2	98.48 metres (323 ft)	28	Proposed
Sankalpa 1	90 metres (295 ft)	25	On Hold
Sankalpa 2	90 metres (295 ft)	25	On Hold

== Timeline of tallest buildings in Kolkata ==
The buildings listed here stand at least 55 metres (180 ft) from the ground.

Name	Image	Height	Floors	Years served as tallest building
Tata Centre		79 metres (259 ft)	18	1963–1976
Chatterjee International Center		91 metres (299 ft)	24	1976–2008
South City Towers		117 metres (384 ft)	36	2008–2013
Urbana Tower 1		152.4 metres (500 ft)	41	2013–2014
Urbana Tower 2		167.7 metres (550 ft)	46	2014–2019
The 42		260 metres (853 ft)	65	2019–present

== See also ==
- List of tallest buildings in India
- List of tallest structures in India
- List of tallest buildings in Mumbai
- List of tallest buildings in different cities in India
- List of tallest buildings and structures in the Indian subcontinent
