= Chatterjee International Center =

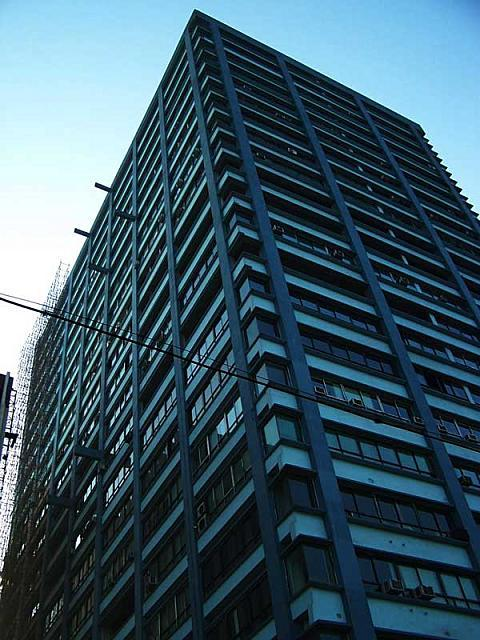

- Location within Kolkata

General information
- Status: Completed
- Location: Kolkata, India
- Coordinates: 22°33′11.71″N 88°20′52.82″E
- Completed: 1976

Height
- Height: 91 metres (299 ft)

Technical details
- Floor count: 24

Chatterjee International Center (CIC) is a high-rise commercial building in Kolkata, India. It is located on Chowringhee Road in the Central Business District of the city. As of July 2012, it is the fifth-tallest building in Kolkata.

== History ==
The Chatterjee International Center is an office building and one of the oldest high-rises in Kolkata. It was completed in 1976. It is also the first twenty-floor-plus building in eastern India. Upon its completion, it was one of the tallest buildings in the country. It rises up to a height of 91 metres (299 ft) from the ground and has 24 floors. Recently, a makeover of the building has been completed.

== See also ==
- List of tallest buildings in Kolkata
