= Metro Cinema (Kolkata) =

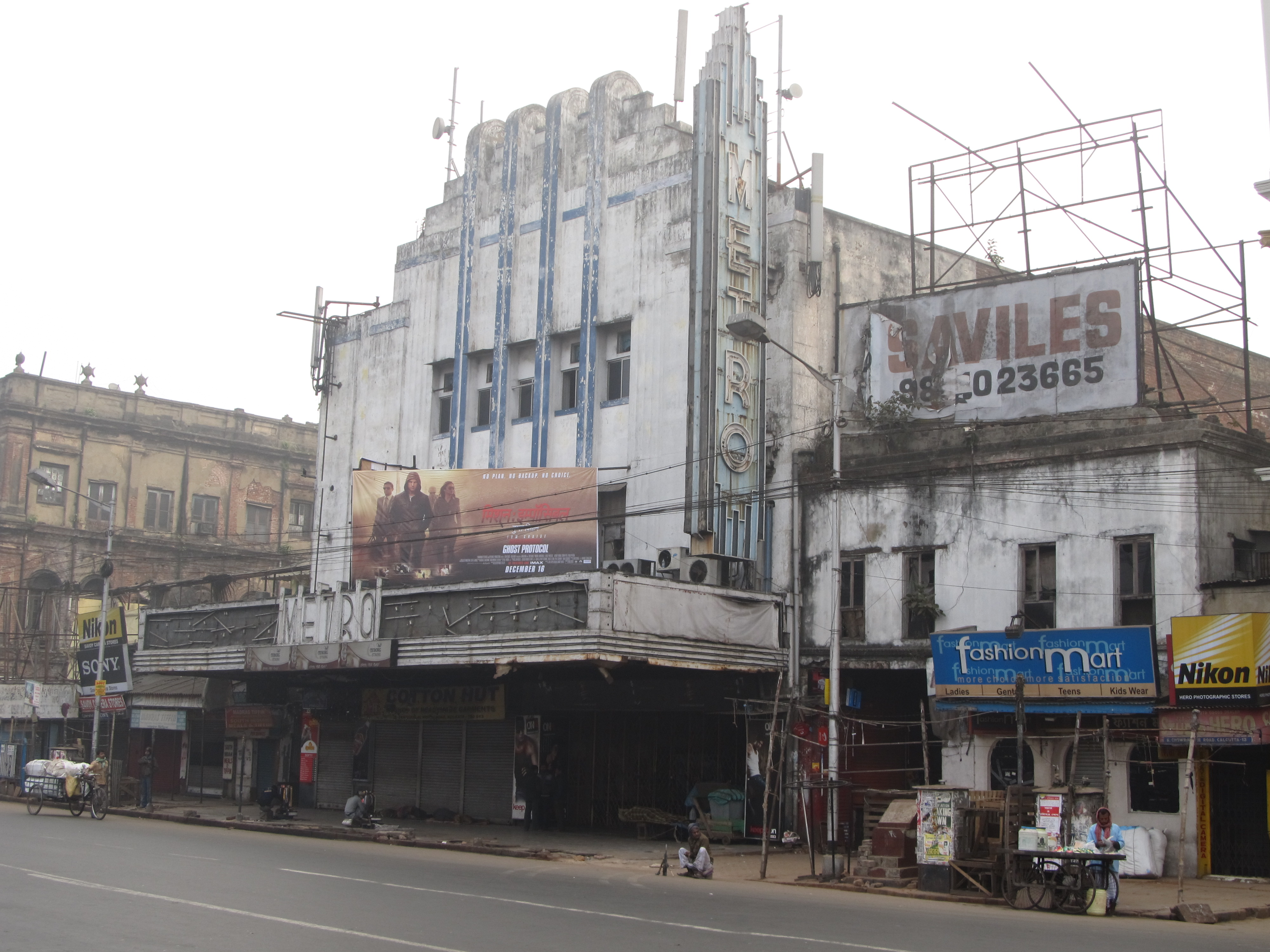
- Metro Cinema Kolkata

- Location within Kolkata

General information
- Status: Reopened as Metro Central and Metro Inox 3D
- Type: Cinema hall, Heritage building
- Architectural style: Art Deco
- Location: in Dharmatala, Esplanade, Central Kolkata, 5, Chowringhee Road, Kolkata, India
- Coordinates: 22.5641°N 88.3494°E
- Current tenants: Metro Reality
- Inaugurated: 1935
- Client: Metro-Goldwyn-Mayer

Technical details
- Floor area: 80,000 sq ft

Design and construction
- Architect: Thomas W. Lamb

Metro Cinema or Metro Cinemas is a uniplex cinema hall and a heritage building located in Jawahar Lal Nehru Road (Esplanade), Kolkata, West Bengal, India. This theatre was opened by Metro-Goldwyn-Mayer in 1935. It is currently owned by a Mumbai-based firm and is undergoing a renovation to be converted into a multiplex theatre. The building is located in the posh Esplanade area of Kolkata, right at the heart of the city. It is a heritage structure and a very famous landmark of the city of Kolkata. And one of the many famous cinema halls in the Esplanade area of Central Kolkata.

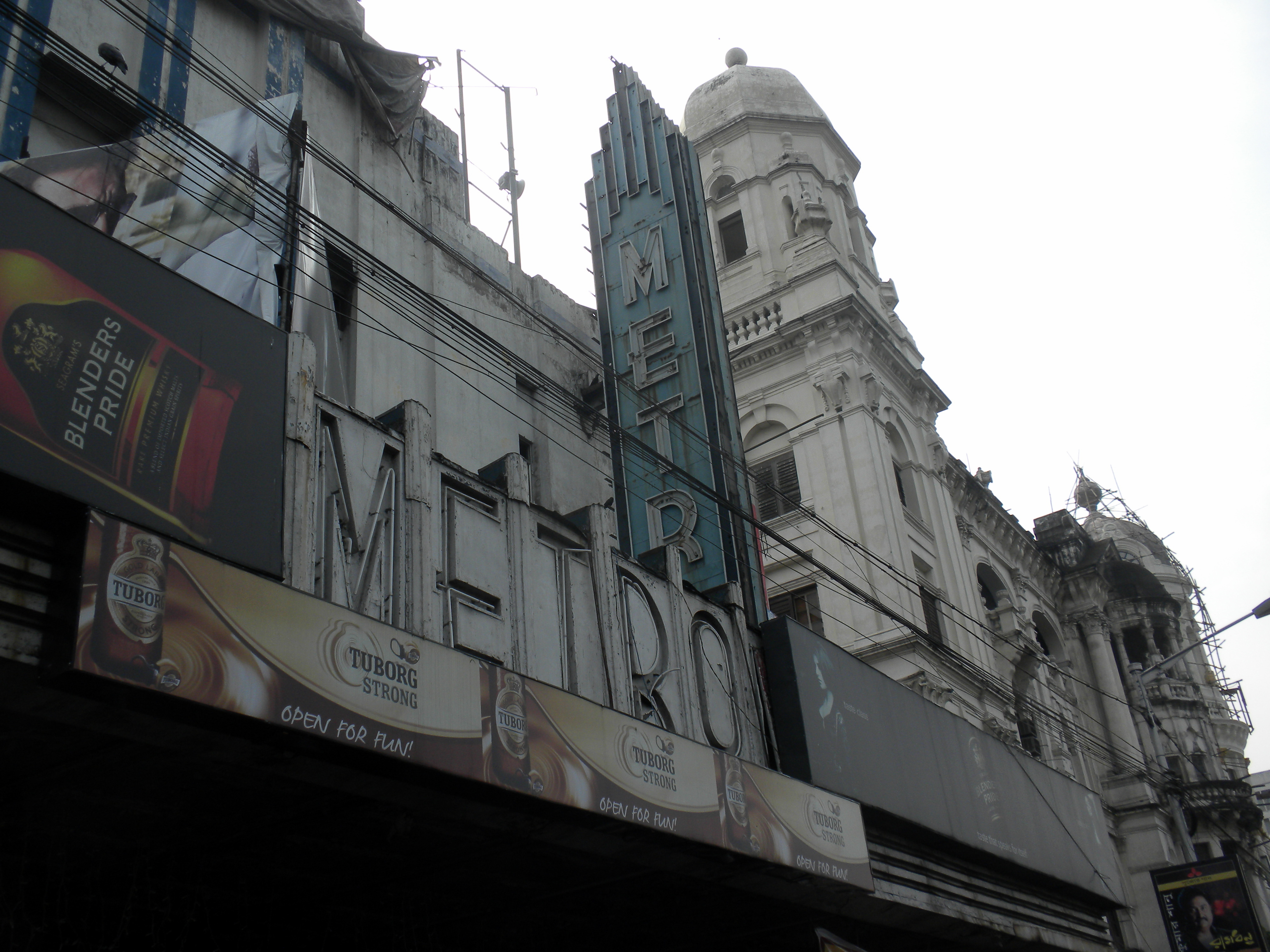
Metro Cinema in Dharmatala, 2010, before renovation

== History ==
This cinema hall was built by Metro-Goldwyn-Mayer, an American Production Company, based in Beverly Hills, United States in 1934 to promote their films in Kolkata (then Calcutta), which was among the most important cities throughout the British Empire and had a large English-speaking population of Britishers,. Famous as an elite British city, Calcutta had a large market for Hollywood films. The theatre was designed by Thomas W. Lamb, a New York-based (Scottish born) theatre architect(who also designed the Metro Cinema, Mumbai for MGM later in 1938 and many other famous theatres around the world). It was inaugurated in 1935. The first film shown in this cinema was Way Out West. The Metro was the most modern of the cinemas in Calcutta till the Lighthouse Cinema came up in the early 1940s. Right since its opening, the Metro cinema had become a favourite among the cinema goers in Calcutta, especially the European elite, consisting of Britishers, Jews and Armenians, who lived in Calcutta in sizeable numbers during the British Raj. Western movies were very popular during the early 20th century among urban elite of the city. Soon the theater became a popular landmark of the city, with shows going housefull. This theater became a significant part of the popular culture of the city of Calcutta (then often dubbed as The City of Joy) during the 1940s, 1950s, 1960s up to the 1970s. The Metro cinema was a favourite among filmgoers during the Golden Ages of the 1940s to 1970s. It was the time when Calcutta was considered the most elite city in the entire Subcontinent. The popularity of Western movies among the Europeans, presence of large number of Europeans and Americans in Calcutta, popularity of Tollywood films during that time and its presence in the posh Esplanade area, all contributed to its popularity. Post independence, the popularity of Hollywood movies decreased gradually as European population left for their homeland, and popularity of Tollywood and Bollywood movies increased since the 1960s so Bollywood and Tollywood films were screened and were very popular. The entire Esplanade area used to be the 'Entertainment Capital' of the city with a number of movie theaters and being a thriving commercial district right at the heart of the city. Business prospered until the 1990s and the early 2000s however much efforts were not put on modernisation and the early charm of the building was lost due to lack of proper maintenance. Although the building had survived phenomenally, the post-independence 'Socialist era' the fatal blow to business came since the late 2000s due to the rise of Multiplexes and their immense popularity completely hit the ticket sales of uniplex theaters across Kolkata. The theater was finally closed in 2011. It was auctioned in 2012 by the heritage commission of the Kolkata Municipal Corporation who wished to preserve the heritage building. It was bought by a Mumbai-based firm who is the current owner of the property. It has been planned to renovate the theater into a 6-storey multiplex along with retail and food courts keeping the heritage facade and the front section of the building, and the Grand Stairways as it is. The renovation started in 2015 and is scheduled to be over by 2017.

== Turning into multiplex ==
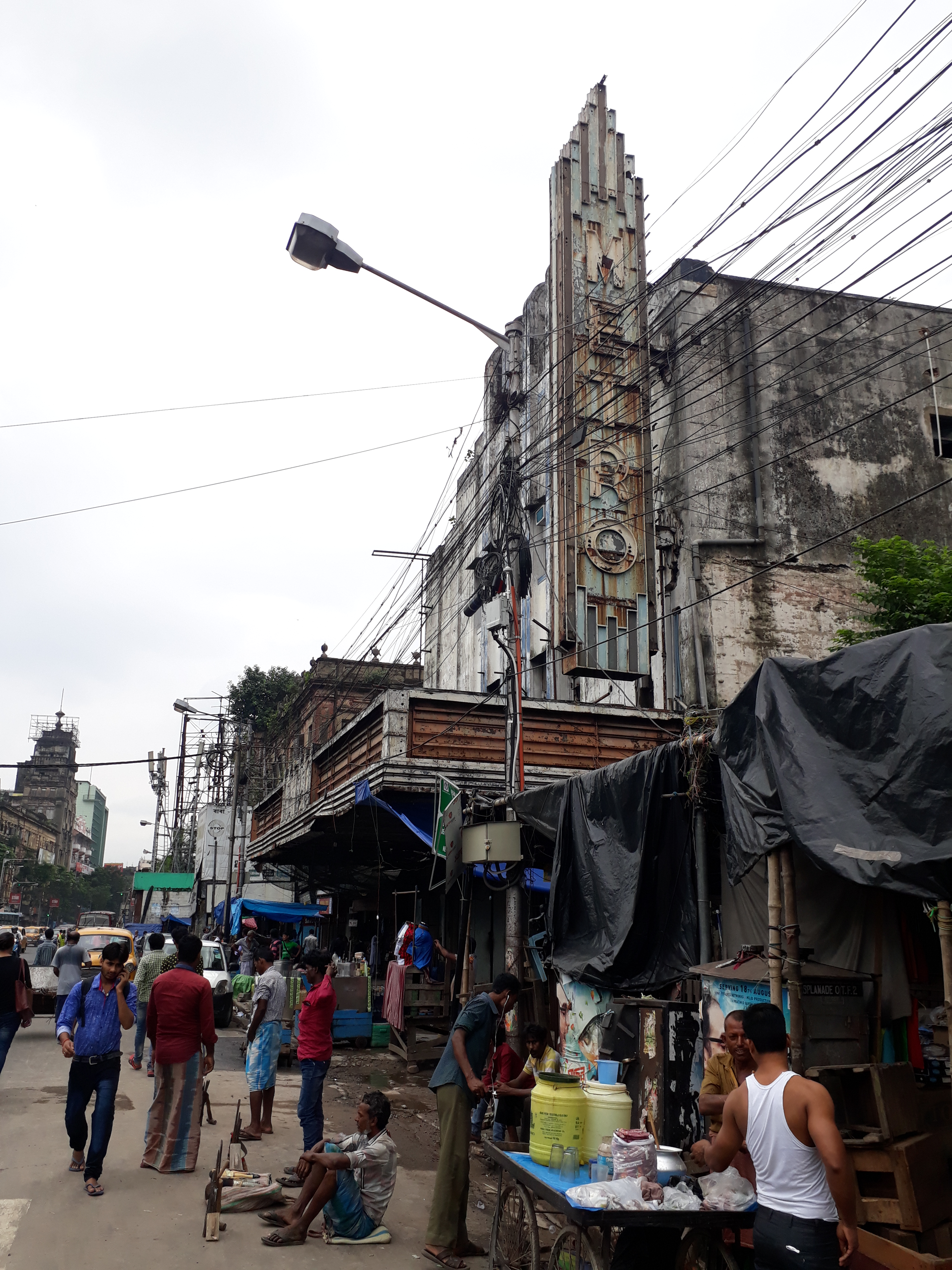
Metro cinema, renovation is going on

As of June 2012 Heritage commission of Calcutta Municipal Corporation initiated a project to turn this standalone theatre into a multiplex. On 27 June 2012, The Telegraph (Calcutta) wrote about this– "This, for many, is yet another instance of the city’s total indifference to its cultural heritage about which it never fails to boast ". A Central mall of the Future Group and a multiplex are likely to be operational at the iconic Metro cinema by the end of 2019. The ongoing redevelopment plan that had been designed by architect firm Dulal Mukherjee & Associates — Art Deco facade with waterfall-style columns and grand staircase — is being retained. The other sections have been demolished to make way for a six-storey, 80,000 sqft facility that will have a mix of retail and entertainment options — three floors retail, one floor cinema and one floor F&B.

== Appearances and Popular Culture ==
Apart from being a famous landmark building of the city, the theatre has often appeared in many Tollywood and Bollywood movies, based in Kolkata. Most notably in the 2014 Bollywood action thriller Gunday, the Metro cinema was the plot for the climax of the movie where Nandita(Priyanka Chopra) invites both Vikram(Ranvir Singh) and Bãla(Arjun Kapoor) "to watch a movie in Metro Cinema ". The theatre becomes the turning point in the story when Bala becomes furious over a man who was trying to molest her, and shoots him in the housefull theatre.

== See also ==
- Priya Cinema
- New Empire Cinema
- Lighthouse Cinema
- Globe Cinema (Kolkata)
