= Lighthouse Cinema (Kolkata) =

- Location within Kolkata

General information
- Status: Inactive
- Type: Past Cinema hall, Heritage building
- Architectural style: Modernism
- Location: Humayun Place in New Market, 2, Humayun Place, Kolkata, India
- Coordinates: 22.5597°N 88.3495°E

Design and construction
- Architect: Willem Marinus Dudok

Lighthouse Cinema was a single screen cinema hall and heritage building located in Humayun Place in New Market, next to New Empire, Kolkata, West Bengal, India .

== History ==
Lighthouse Cinema was established in 1934 for screening Hollywood films. The theatre was designed by W.M. Dudok. For 70 years this was one of the most popular cinemas in Kolkata. This was one of the largest cinema halls in India with 1396 sitting capacity. Later it was reduced from 1396 to 600.

== Closing of Lighthouse ==
After 2000 the hall started to suffer a heavy financial loss. In February 2002 the theatre managements decided to close the theatre because of the heavy loss they suffered in last few years and it was permanently closed on 22 February 2002. Two years after closing the hall, in 2004, the theatre's license was also taken away and it turned into a bleak house after some legal actions against "unauthorised changes" made to the premises. After that the entire cinema was converted to Citimart, a shopping complex.

== See also ==
- Metro Cinema
- Globe Cinema
