= Metropolitan Building (Kolkata) =

Building in Kolkata, India

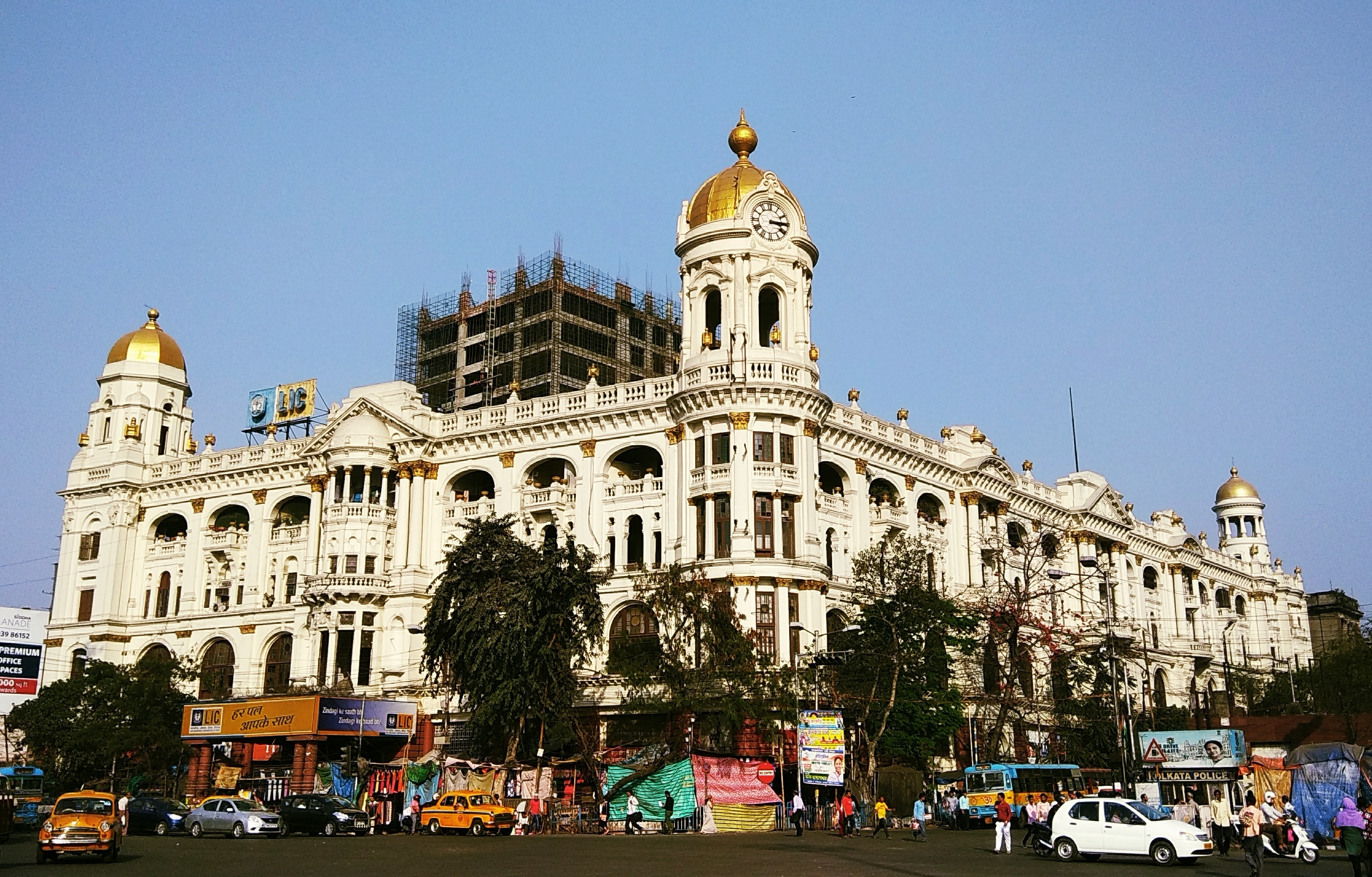
- Metropolitan Building in Esplanade, Kolkata, from the Chowringhee Crossing
- Interactive map of the Metropolitan Building area
- Former names: Whiteway & Laidlaw department store

General information
- Status: Used as a residential and commercial building
- Location: 7, Chowringhee Road, Kolkata, India
- Coordinates: 22.5637°N 88.3516°E
- Elevation: 9.509 m (31.20 ft)
- Current tenants: Life Insurance Corporation of India; also houses many offices and stores such as Big Bazaar and the Central Cottage Industry Showroom
- Construction started: 1905
- Owner: Life Insurance Corporation of India

Website
- Website

The Metropolitan Building is a commercial building on Chowringhee Road in Kolkata near Esplanade. It is located near the Shaheed Minar and the Grand Hotel and is just opposite of the new Esplanade Metro Station. Formerly known as the Whiteaway Laidlaw department store, it was a famous department store in Calcutta during the British Rule in India. It is one of the first departmental store in India. This neo-baroque emporium—with domes, a clock tower and arched recessed windows—exemplifies fashionable shopping during the British Raj in British India.

The building was built in 1905. After Independence, Metropolitan Life Insurance Co. assumed ownership against a borrower default and named the building, so people know it more commonly as the Metropolitan Building.

In 1956, Metropolitan Insurance was nationalised under the Life Insurance Act of parliament and the LIC took over the company and its assets from its owning family, the Bhattacharyas. The family continued adverse occupation of a large part of the building for years after the acquisition, and appealed to the courts over the next three generations until all claimants had died. The LIC eventually obtained full possession and is the current owner.

== History ==
The building was built in 1905.

After Independence, the Metropolitan Life Insurance Co. assumed ownership, so people know it more commonly as Metropolitan Building as the building also housed the Metropolitan Bank, another family-owned financial enterprise.

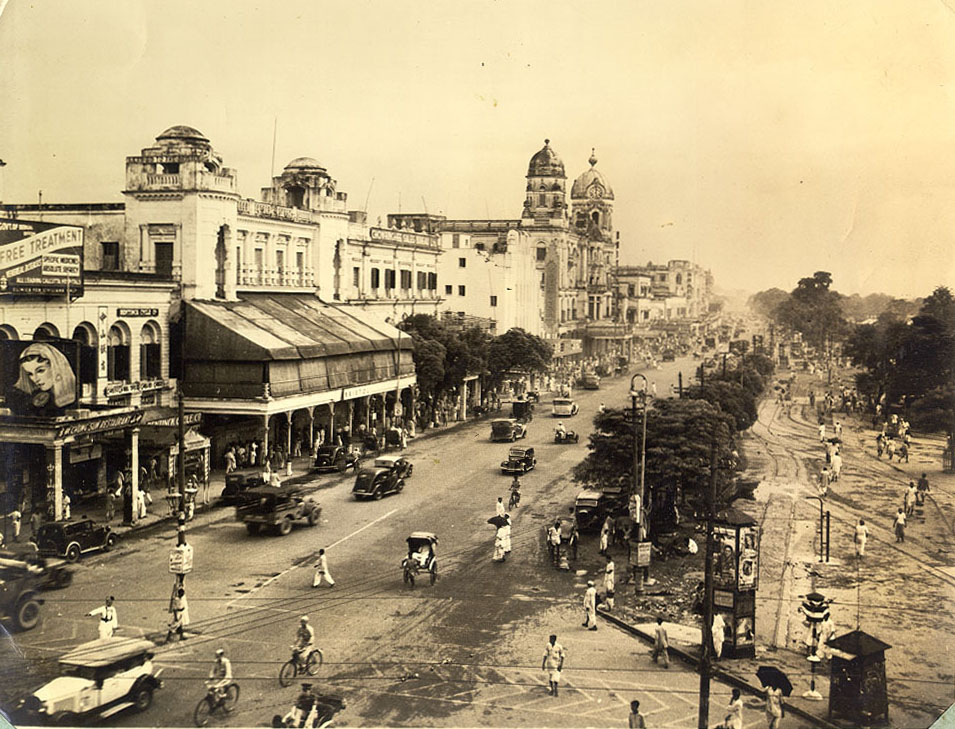
The building's clock tower seen at the end of the photo taken in Esplanade, Calcutta in 1945

=== Renovation ===
The building was restored by the Life Insurance Corporation of India (LIC). It still houses a commercial complex. The building was freshly repainted with white and golden paint. Its exterior structure was also renovated, and extensive changes were made within.

== Features ==
It is a large beautiful building recognisable by its corner tower with the dome raised high on a pavilion. There is rustication in the ground floor and a semicircular arched arcade in the first floor. The facade is punctuated by a series of projected and pedimented bays with plain columns and Corinthian capitals.

== Gallery ==
Metropolitan Building gallery

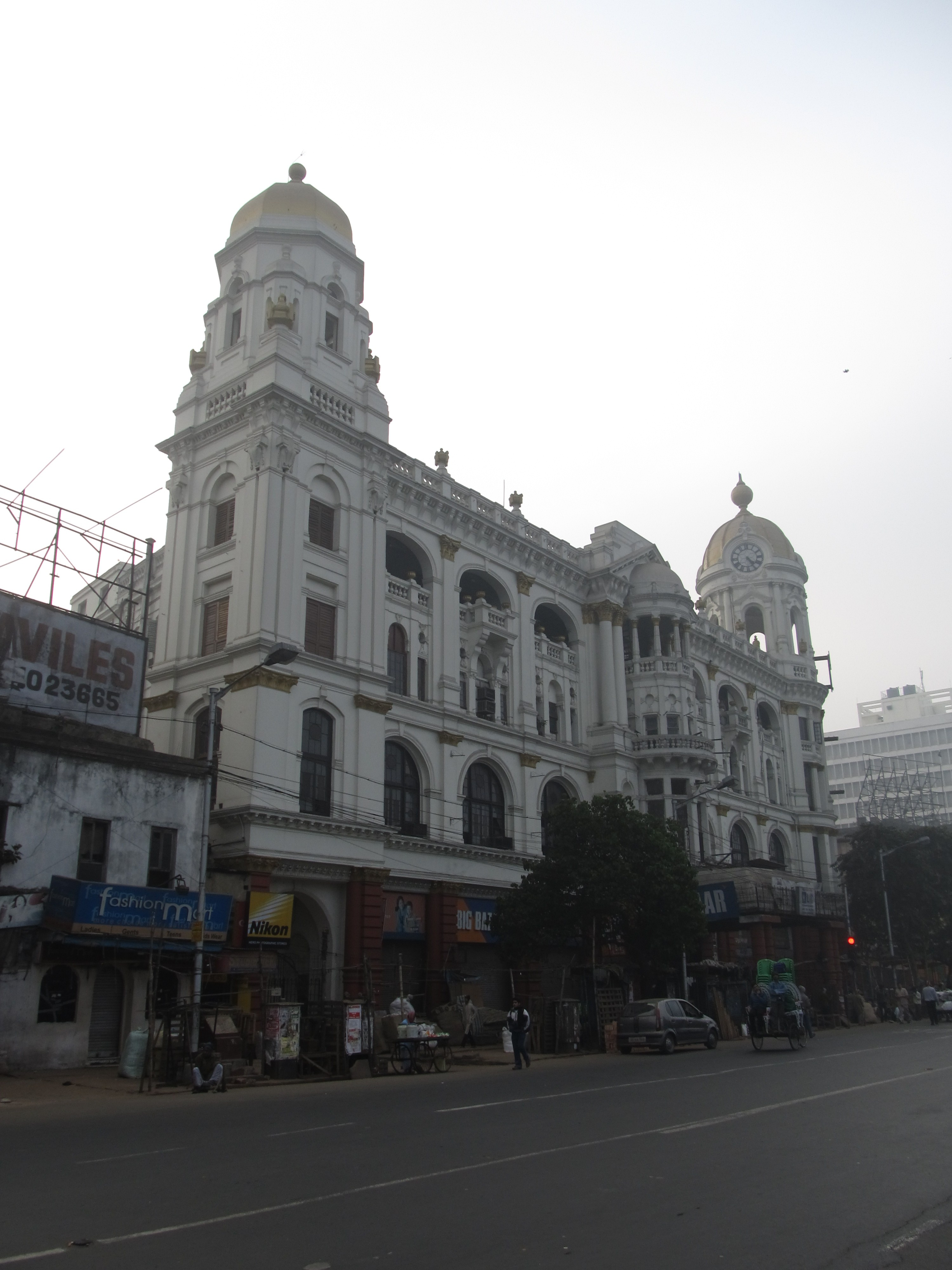
Metropolitan Building in Esplanade, Kolkata after a recent renovation

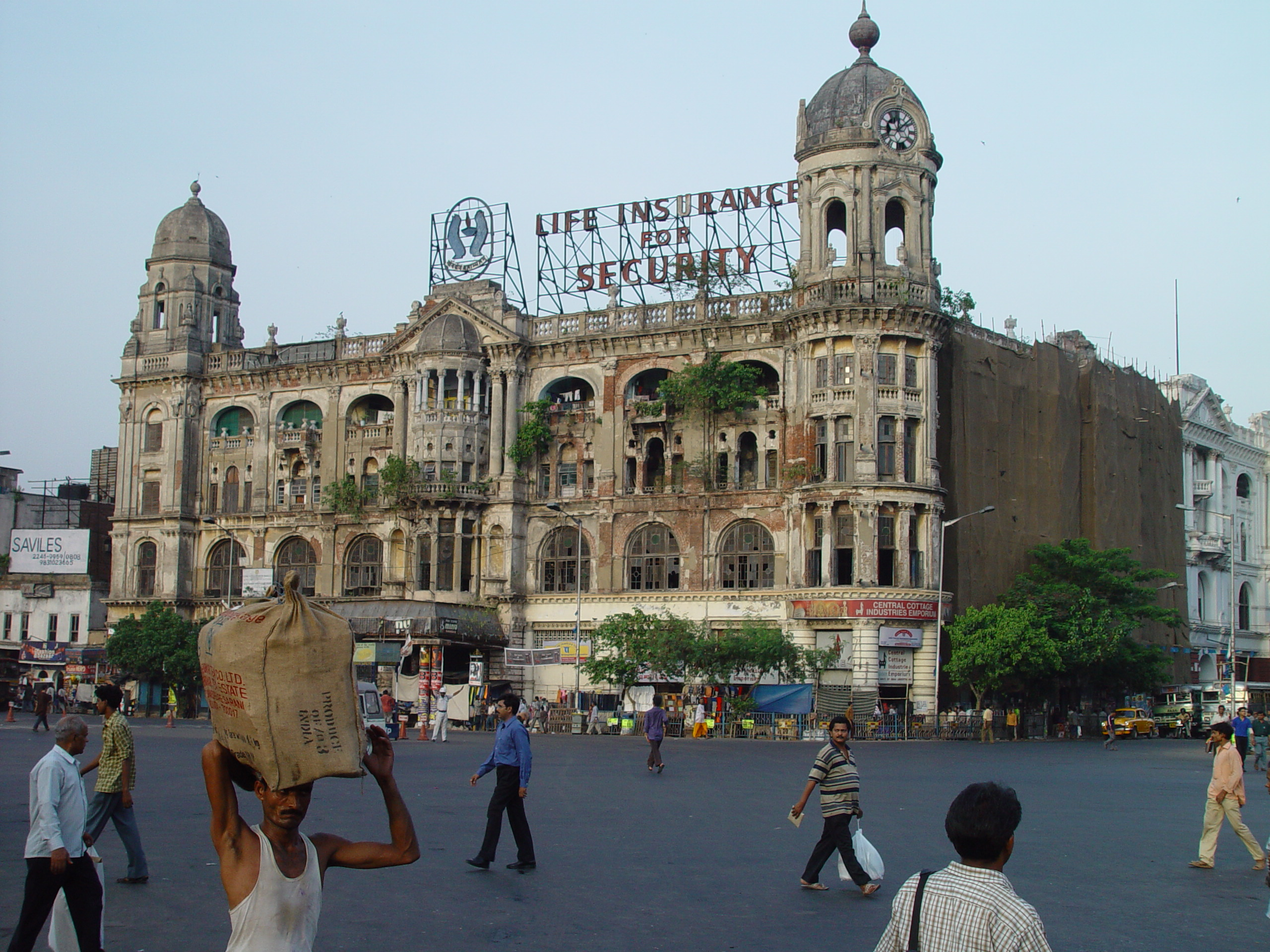
The building under renovation

== See also ==
- Esplanade, Kolkata
- Jawaharlal Nehru Road
- Chowringhee
