= Globe Cinema (Kolkata) =

Building in India

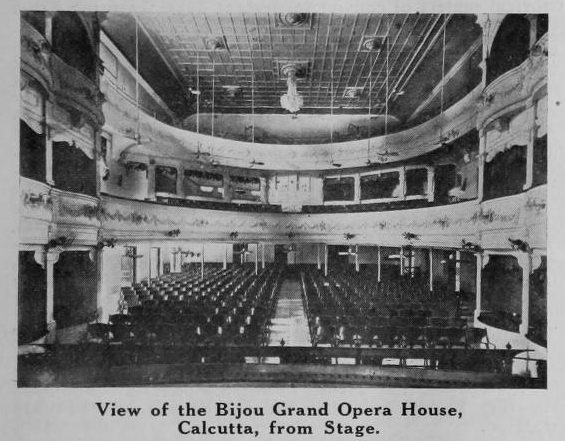
- View from the stage in 1918

- Location within Kolkata

General information
- Status: Re-Opened
- Type: Cinema hall, heritage building
- Location: Lindsay Street, Esplanade, 7E, Lindsay Street, Kolkata, India
- Coordinates: 22.5591°N 88.3501°E

Globe Cinema was a single screen cinema hall and heritage building located in Lindsay Street (opposite New Market entrance), Kolkata, West Bengal, India. The theatre was previously known as Old Opera House. The wooden opera house was established in 1827 and sold to E. M. Cohen in 1906. Cohen converted it into a movie theatre and named it Globe Cinema. The theatre was owned by Sidhwa family and Jal Tata. Dhansri Abasan Pvt Ltd partnered with Goldstar Enclave Pvt Ltd and acquired the Globe Theatre Pvt Ltd from them.

The gigantic single-screen theatre has made way for a mini-mall with a twin-theatre multiplex, over 100 retail stores and a food court. In October 2024, it was restored as dual-plex cinema hall by Satadeep Saha, CEO of SSR Cinemas, who leased the building.

== History ==
The original wooden opera house was established in 1827. In 1906, the house, then known as Bijou Grand Opera House, was sold by E. H. Ducasse to E.M. Cohen. Cohen renamed it Grand Opera House. Later it was converted into a theatre hall and named Globe Cinema. This was one of the first few theatres in Calcutta which regularly screened English movies.

During World War II, the hall provided entertainment for Allied troops stationed in Calcutta.

In 2000, Arijit Dutta, film distributor of Priya Entertainment, leased the hall. Priya Entertainment returned it to the owners in April 2006.

In July, 2011 the cinema hall was acquired by Nitin Kumar Jain, Sri. Megh Raj Daga and Devinder Singh Shant. By 2014, under the stewardship of this team led by Jain and his company, Konsortia Construction Company Pvt. Ltd., the cinema hall was converted into a boutique shopping mall with about 100 shops and a two-screen multiplex, along with food courts.

== Restoration ==
On 6 October 2024, Satadeep Saha, the CEO of SSR Cinemas, leased the building and reopened the cinema hall as a dual-plex on the occasion of Durga Puja. It has been renamed as SSR Globe Cinemas. There are two screens have seating capacities of 239 and 197 respectively. In 2004, Titanic was the last film which was screened at the hall before it was closed for 20 years. To commemorate the reopening ceremony, Dev and Srijit Mukherji sold tickets for their upcoming film Tekka from the hall's ticket counter. It became the first film to be screened in 2024. Along with Stree 2, the cinema hall became operational once again from 8 October 2024.
