= New Empire Cinema (Kolkata) =

- Location within Kolkata

General information
- Status: Active
- Type: Cinema hall, Past theatre auditorium, Heritage building
- Location: Humayun Place in New Market, 1 & 3 A, Humayun Place, New Market, Kolkata, India
- Coordinates: 22.5605°N 88.3493°E

New Empire Cinema is a single screen cinema hall located in Humayun Place in New Market, (opposite Shreeram Arcade), Kolkata, West Bengal, India. This theatre is next to Lighthouse Cinema.

== History ==
Major general Shamsher Jung Bahadur Rana, Home Minister of Nepal acquired 45 properties in Kolkata (then Calcutta). New Empire theatre was one of them. New Empire cinema auditorium was set up in 1932. The chief designer architect of this theatre was A. de Bois Shrosbree. At that time this theatre was used to perform Ballets and plays. Eminent performers like Yehudi Menuhin, Zubin Mehta, Uday Shankar, Amala Shankar, Bohurupee (Sombhu Mitra and Tripti Mitra) performed in this theatre. In 1932 Indian Noble laureate Rabindranath Tagore directed play Natir Pooja here.

In the early 1950s films were introduced here alongside theatre performances. In the late 1950s this was turned into a complete cinema hall. Under the chairmanship of V. Shantaram, the First International New Youth Film was held in New Empire.

== Current status ==
The adjacent building is the Lighthouse Cinema it was closed in 2002, however, the New Empire Cinema is still active. Currently, the cinema's capacity is 1000 seats. The theatre management is running a few food stalls like Domino's, KFC, Barista which is helping them to gain financial stability.
