= Esplanade, Kolkata =

Esplanade
- Neighbourhood in Kolkata
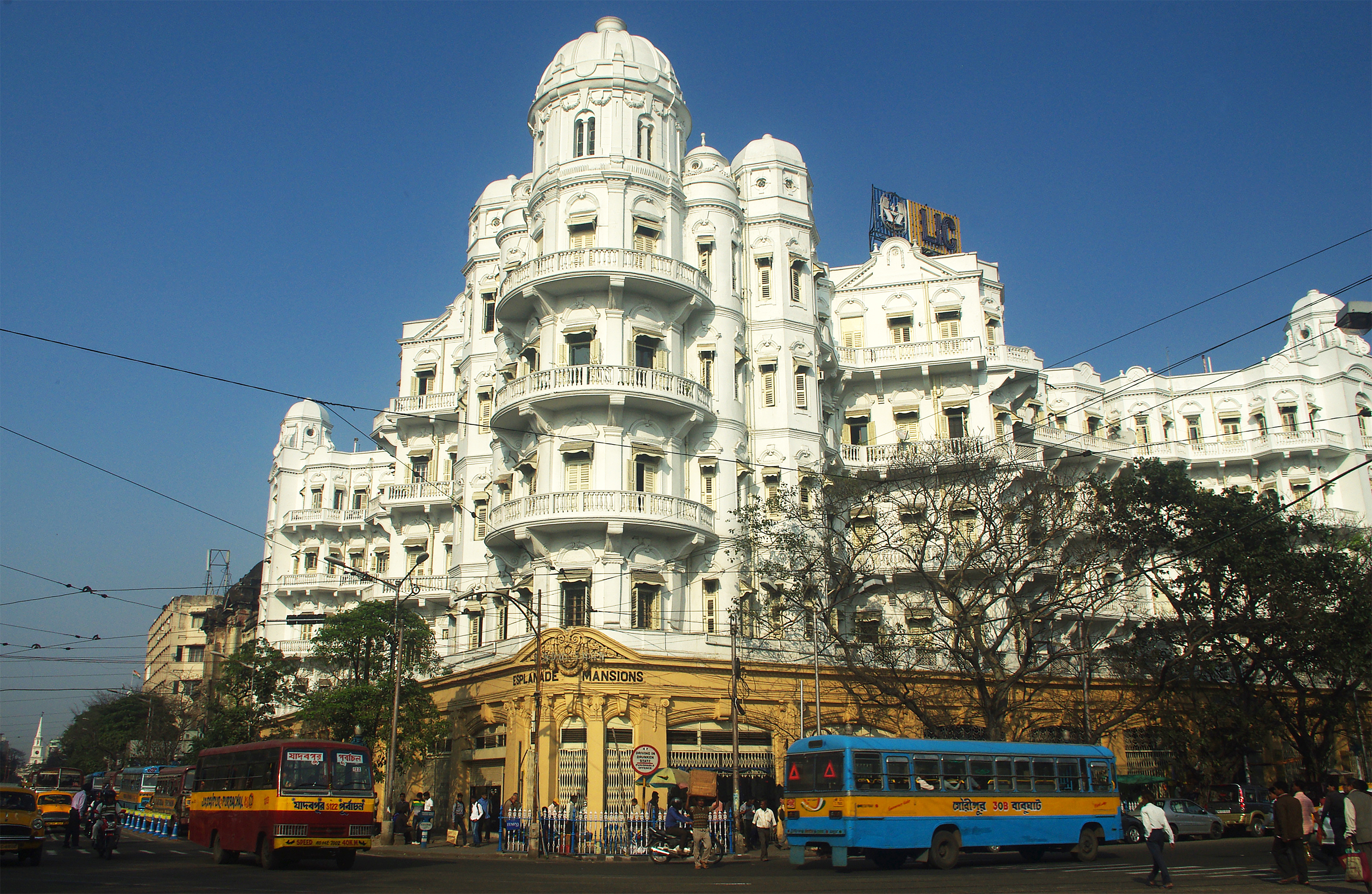
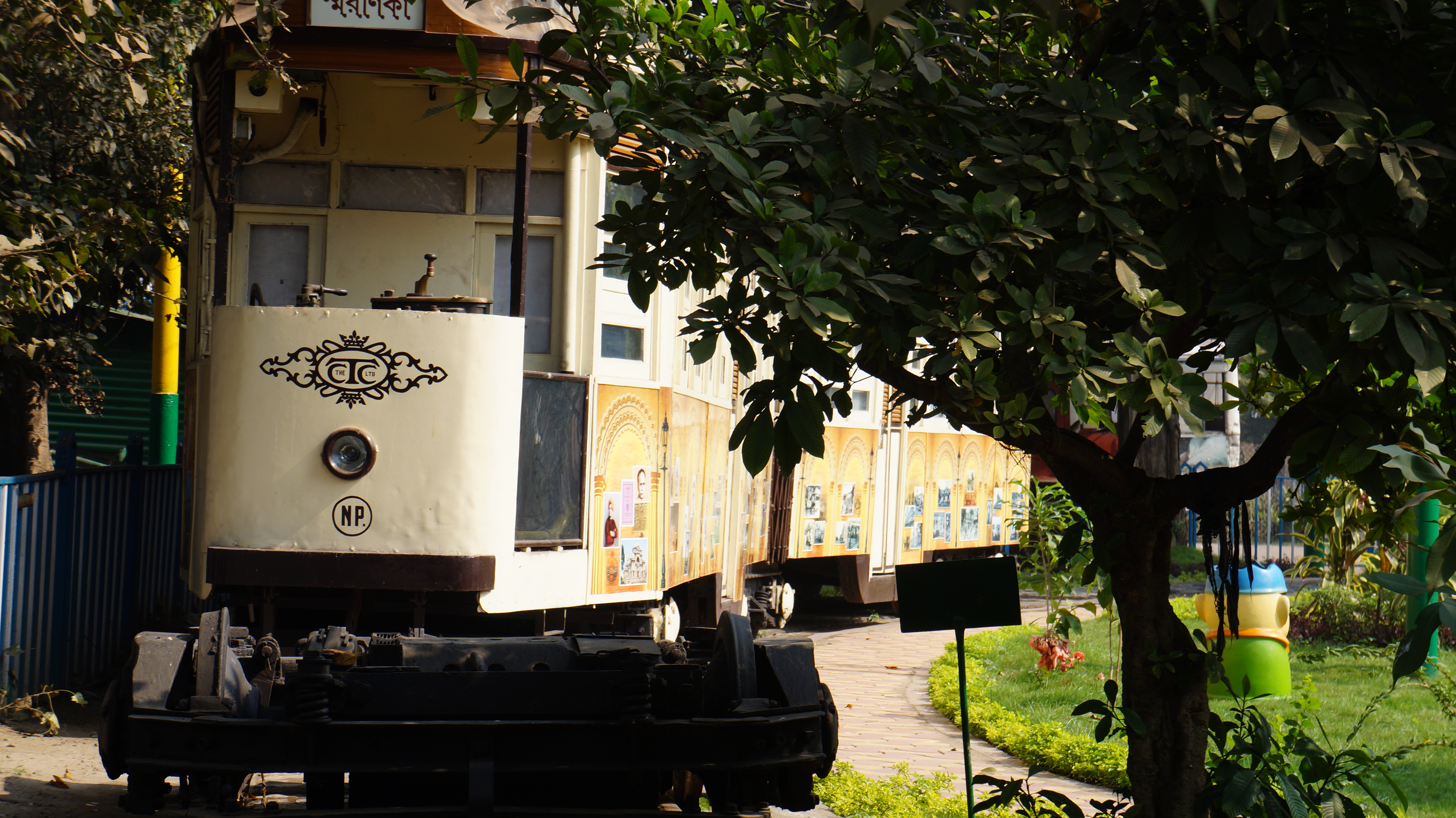
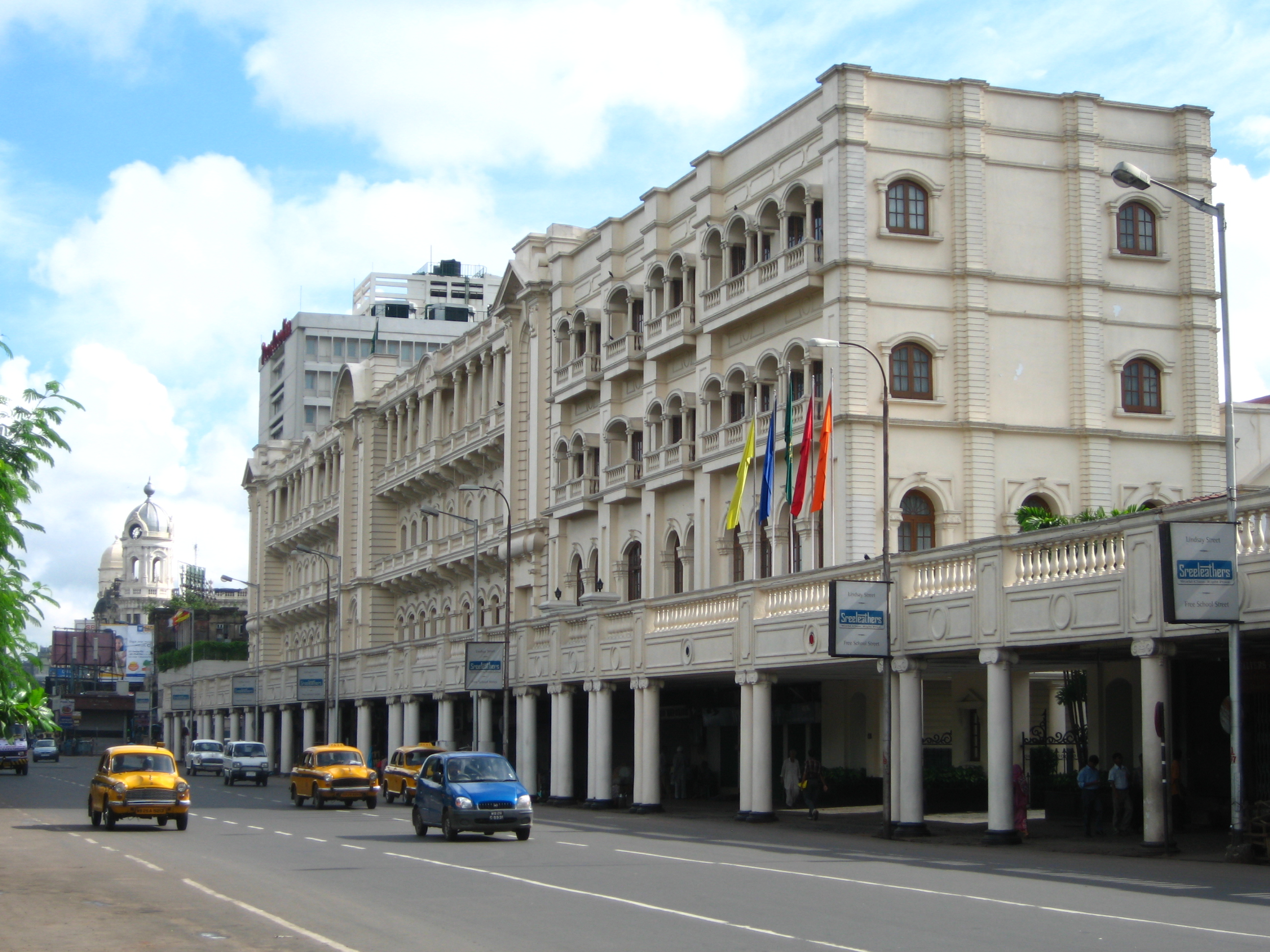
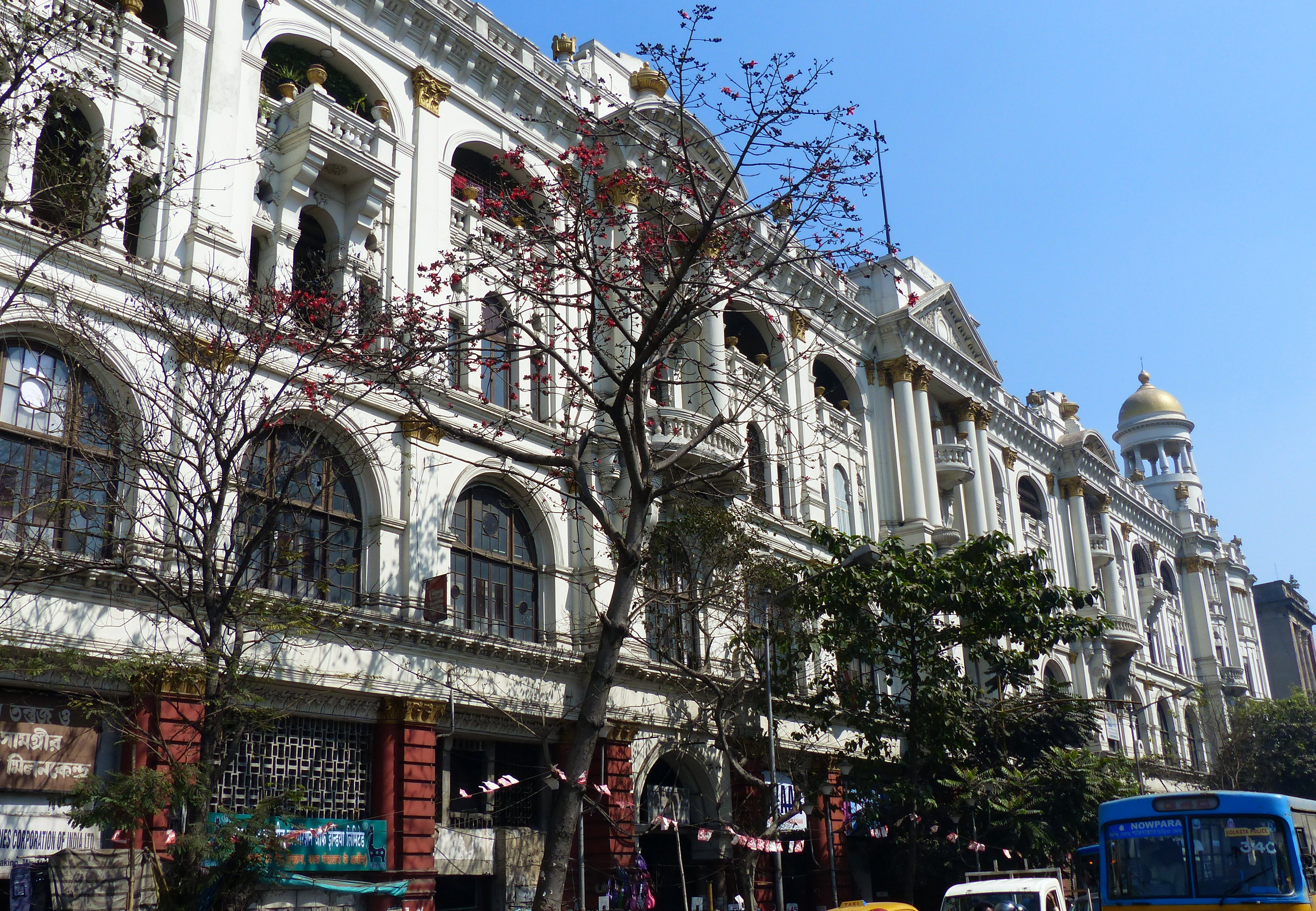
- Esplanade mansion at the terminal of Esplanade row Tram museum at Esplanade terminus Oberoi Grand Hotel Metropolitan building

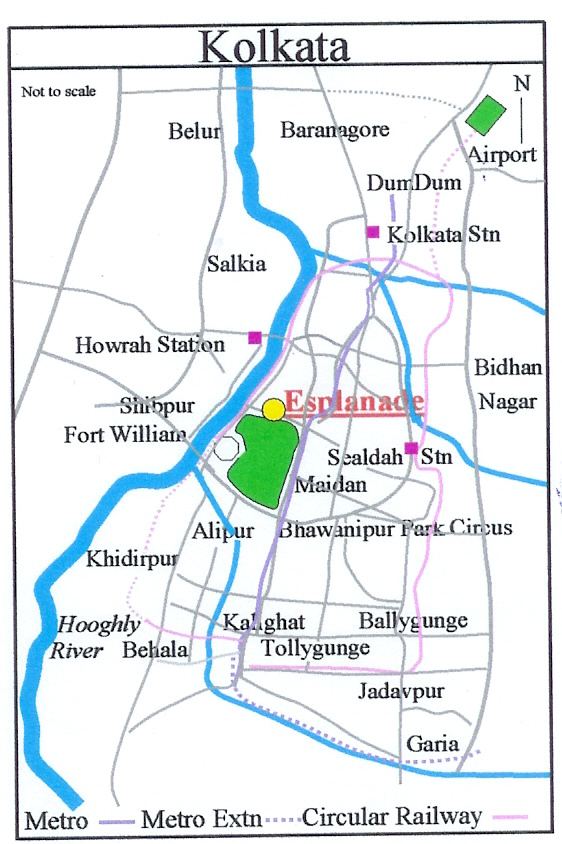
- Coordinates: 22.564955°N 88.346346°E
- Country: India
- State: West Bengal
- City: Kolkata
- District: Kolkata
- Municipal Corporation: Kolkata Municipal Corporation
- KMC wards: 45, 46
- Elevation: 36 ft (11 m)

Population
  - Total: For population see linked KMC ward pages
- Time zone: UTC+5:30 (IST)
- PIN: 700069
- Area code: +91 33
- Lok Sabha constituency: Kolkata Uttar
- Vidhan Sabha constituency: Chowranghee
- Kolkata Metro station: Esplanade
- Tram stop: Esplanade terminus
- Bus stand: Dharmatala bus stand

Esplanade is a neighbourhood of Central Kolkata, located at the heart of city with being the city's Central business district and major transport junction. This is a conventional esplanade because the Hooghly River, the western distributary of Ganges, flows nearby and it is adjacent to the large fields of Maidan extending up to Fort William.

== History ==
The Esplanade was the name given to the northern portion of jungle, which later formed the Maidan. In olden days, it stretched from Dharmatala (now Lenin Sarani) to Chandpal Ghat on the Hooghly river. In the days of Warren Hastings, it formed a favourite promenade for 'elegant walking parties'.

The first pictures of the area is at the end of eighteenth century by Daniell and William Baillie. The old Government House and the Council House were conspicuous objects in each drawing. He also presented an addition view in the shape of two elephants with a crowd of attendants.

The strengthening of British power, subsequent to their victory in the Battle of Plassey was followed by the construction of the new Fort William, in 1758. The European inhabitants of Kalikata gradually forsook the narrow limits of the old palisades and moved to around the Maidan.

The first recorded football match in Kolkata was played on the Esplanade in the second week of April 1858 between the Calcutta Club of Civilians and the 'Gentlemen of Barrakpur'. There had been matches earlier but those were not documented.

== Road Network and Landmarks of the Esplanade ==
A number of roads and streets form part of or have been linked integrally with the Esplanade for many years.

=== Esplanade Row ===
The street named Esplanade Row, finds a mention in the map of 1784, running from Dhurmotollah right on to the banks of the river at Chandpal Ghat, passing on its way Government House and Council House, both facing south. Subsequently, it was divided by the gardens of Government House into two parts, Esplanade Row (East) and Esplanade Row (West). Esplanade Row (West) now runs between Government Place (West) and Strand Road, through the Kolkata High Court. Esplanade Row (East) has been renamed Sidhu Kanu Dahar and occupies the northern end of the Maidan.

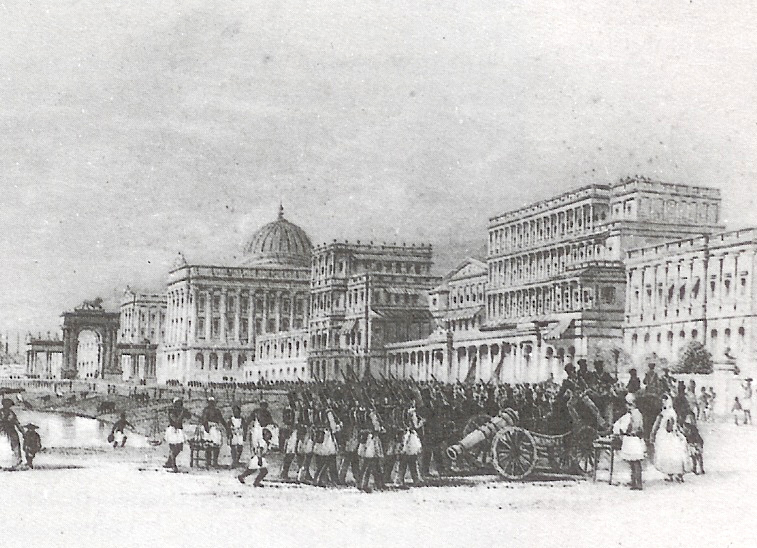
Esplanade Row (East) in the 19th century – a painting by Allom, T.

As a result of the movement of Europeans from the old palisades in the eighteenth century, Esplanade Row took on a new look. The most important public buildings and imposing private houses lined the northern side of the Esplanade, facing the Maidan on the south. "Esplanade Row", wrote Mrs. Fay, "seems to be composed of palaces".

The Tipu Sultan Mosque is at the junction of Esplanade Row (East) and Dhurmotollah Street (Lenin Sarani). A number of statues adorn the area.

=== Old Court House Street ===
Old Court House Street connects Esplanade Row (East) (or presently Sidhu Kanu Dahar) with B.B.D. Bagh, earlier known as Dalhousie Square. It acquired its name from the Old Court house, that was located where St. Andrew's Church now stands. It served originally as the Supreme Court, until it was demolished in 1792. The northern part of the stretch is known as B.B.D. Bagh (East). It was constructed around 1781, when the finishing touches were put to the new Fort William. It is linked with the name of Col. Henry Watson, who brought about many improvements in Calcutta, including the laying out of surrounding Esplanade. The Red Road is an extension of this street. The stretch of Old Court House Street from the crossing with Ganesh Avenue or the south-eastern corner of B.B.D. Bagh to the crossing with Waterloo Street has been renamed Hemanta Basu Sarani. The stretch from the crossing with Waterloo Street to the crossing with Rani Rashmoni Avenue has been renamed Marx Engels Beethi Road.

=== Council House Street ===
Council House Street connects the western part of B.B.D. Bagh with Esplanade Row. It acquires its name from the old council house, which stood on the western portion of Government House. It was pulled down in 1800. The southern part of the street was subsequently called Government Place West. Fort William College was located at the corner of Council House Street.

== Transport and Connectivity ==
Esplanade has always been a major traffic hub. In 1902, the first electric tram car (route no. 36) ran from Esplanade to Kidderpore. In 1984, the first underground metro railway (Kolkata Metro Blue Line) in India, started from Tollygunge to Esplanade and in a similar way East–West metro (Kolkata Metro Green Line 2) was opened on a truncated section from Esplanade to Howrah Maidan. Today, Esplanade is the busiest bus terminus and largest metro interchange of West Bengal. Kolkata trams route no. 5, 25 and 36 also start their journey from Esplanade. Kolkata Metro Purple Line, which is under construction, will also pass through Esplanade.

In 2002, it was estimated that during rush hours some 200,000 to 300,000 vehicles passed through Esplanade.

According to transport department officials, over 2,000 long-distance buses operate from the city. Most of the state and private buses originate from the Esplanade and Babughat, nearby.

Eden Gardens railway station on Kolkata Circular Railway line is the nearest railway station. Sealdah Station, one of the five major railway-terminals of Kolkata Metropolitan Area, is also located nearby.

== Political Protests and Mass Mobilization ==
The growing influence of the left-wing, particularly the Communist Party of India in organising urban protest was strongly felt from around 1957. The old institutions of mass mobilisation were strengthened to suit the agitation-oriented strategy of various political parties. A particularly significant expression of this agitation-oriented form of opposition to government policies was the way in which massive demonstrations of tens of thousands of people were organised in the heart of the city. Esplanade East, and Brigade Parade ground, lying just outside the citadels of power, were the new rallying points of mass protest.

== Gallery ==
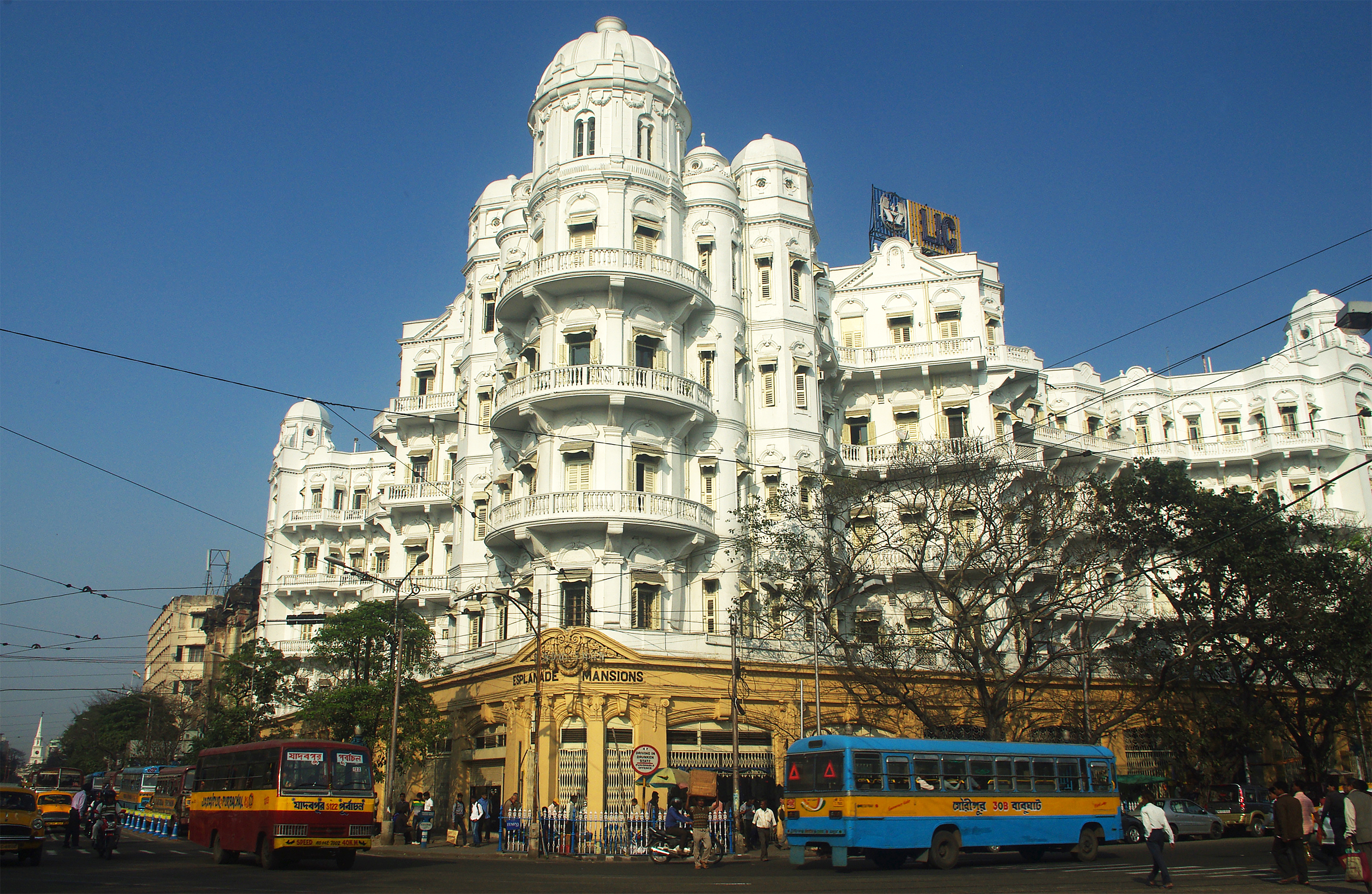
Esplanade Mansions

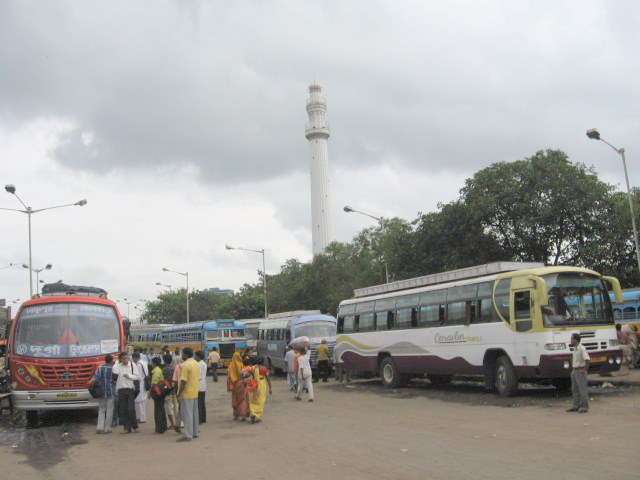
Esplanade Bus Station with Shaheed Minar in the background

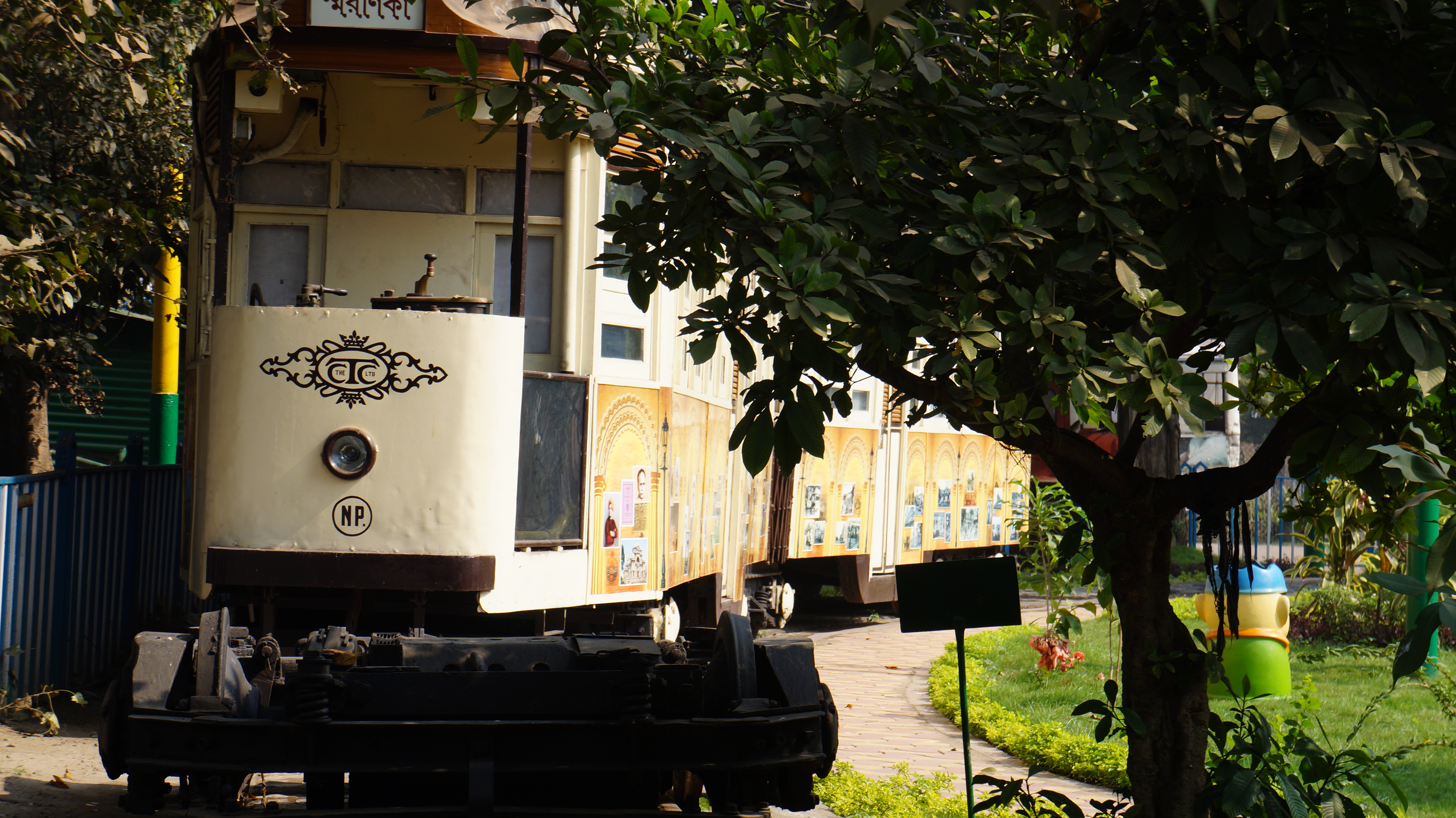
Tram Museum (Smaranika) in Esplanade Tram Terminus

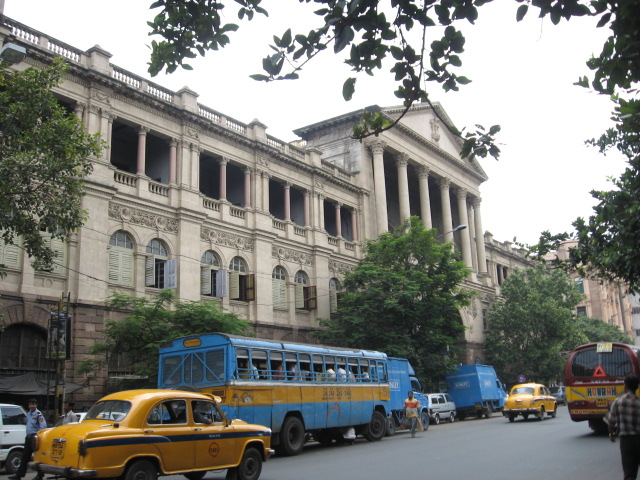
Ordnance Factory Board's Office

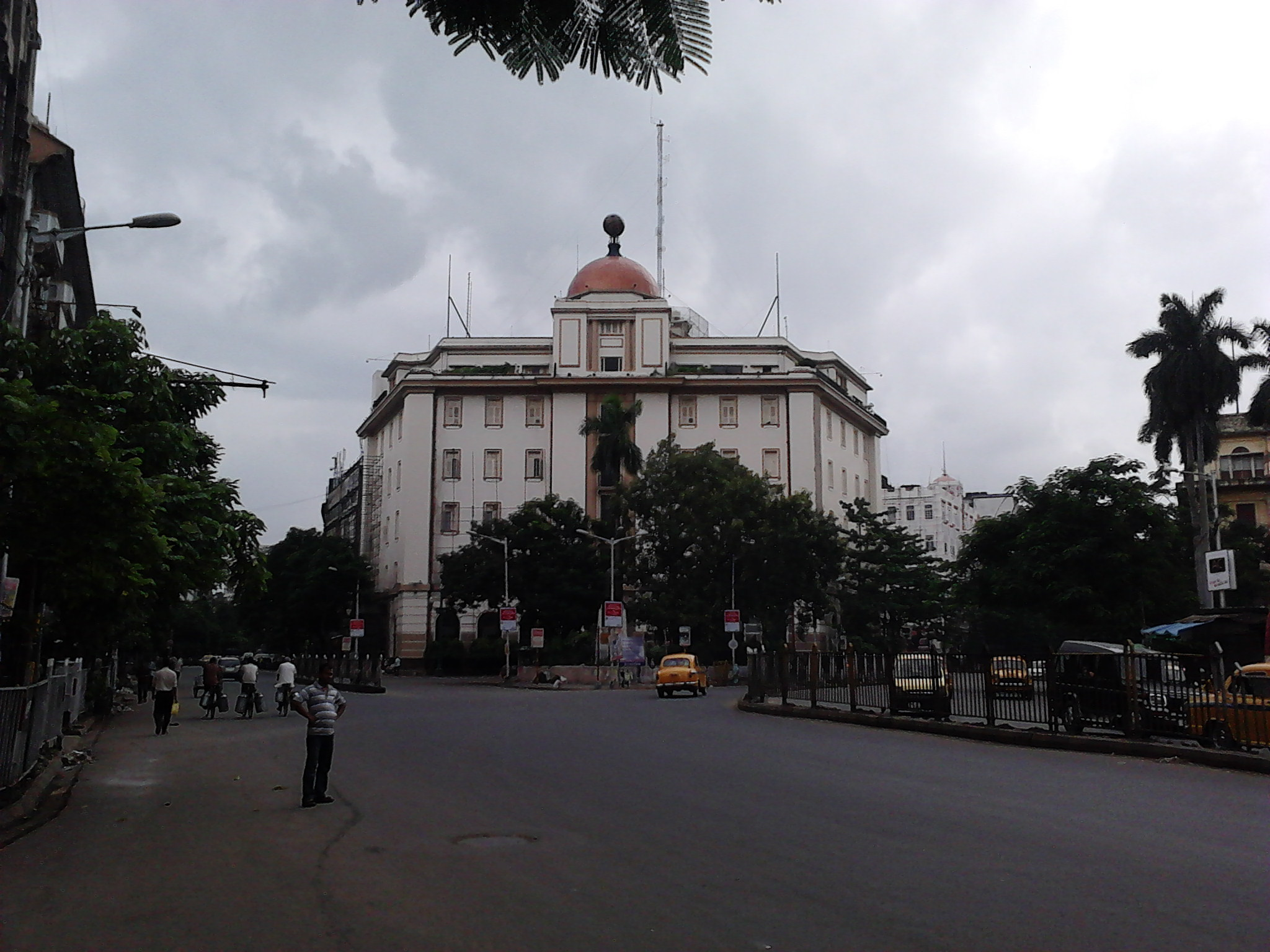
Victoria House

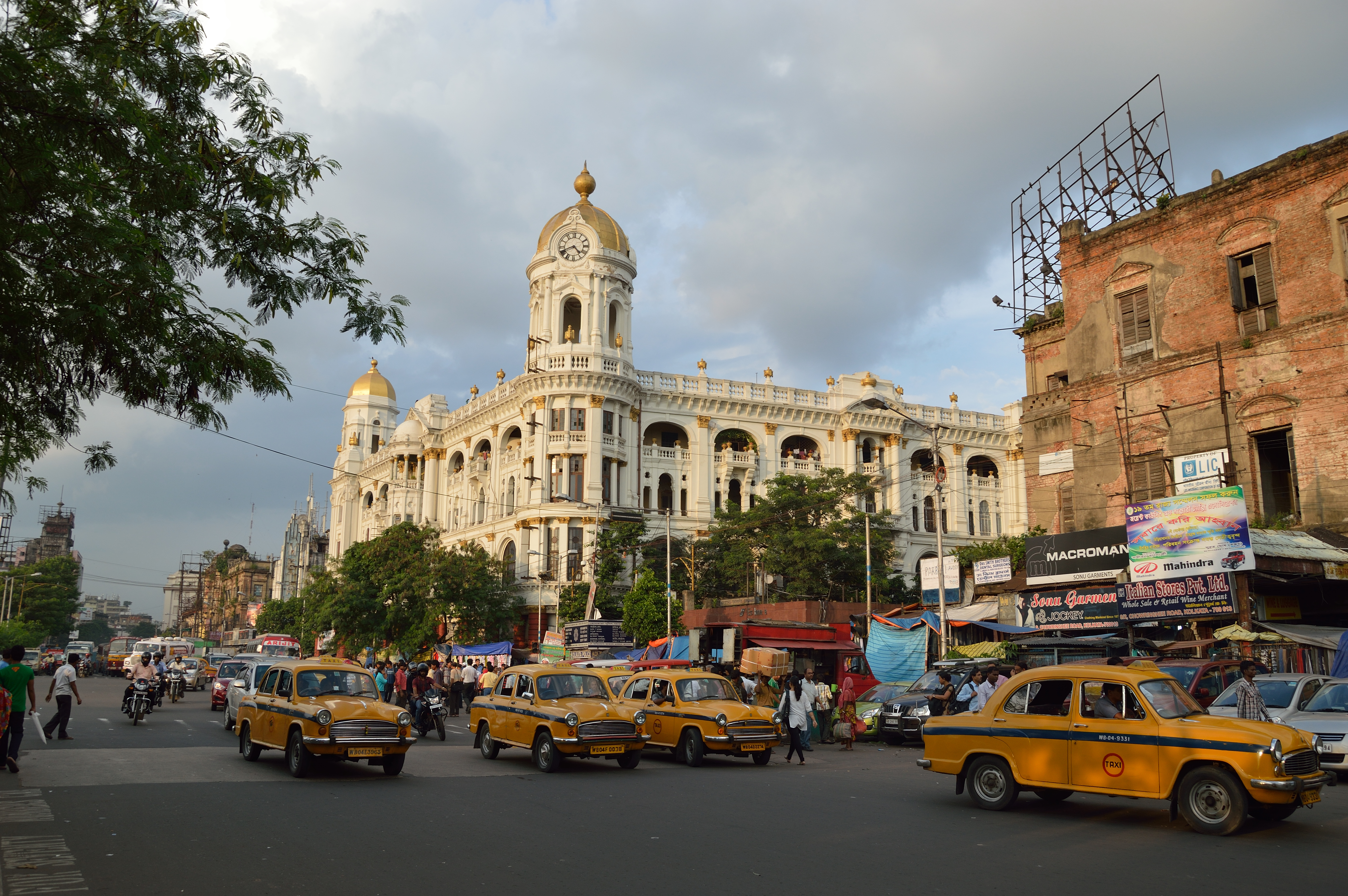
Metropolitan Building

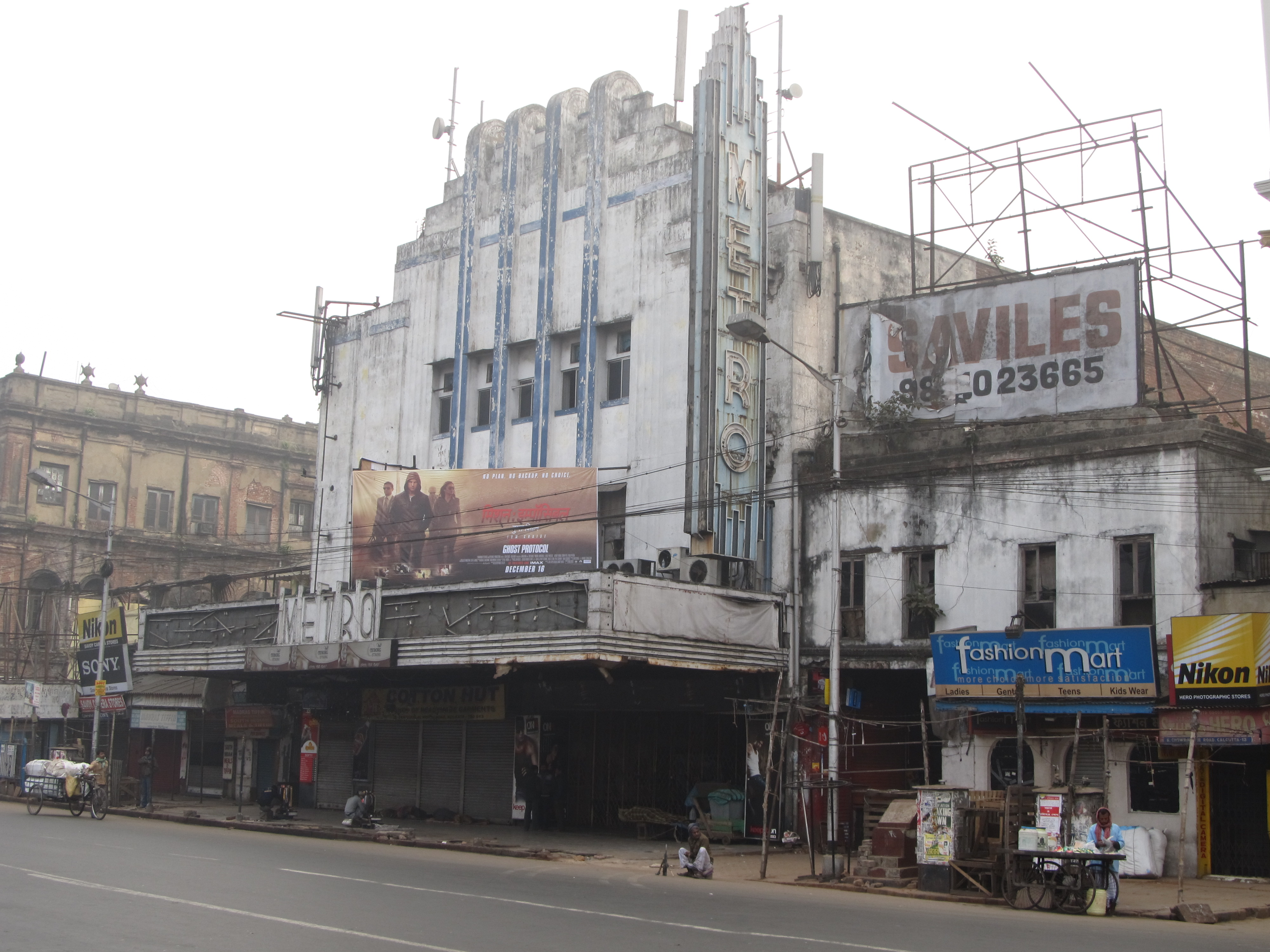
Metro Cinema

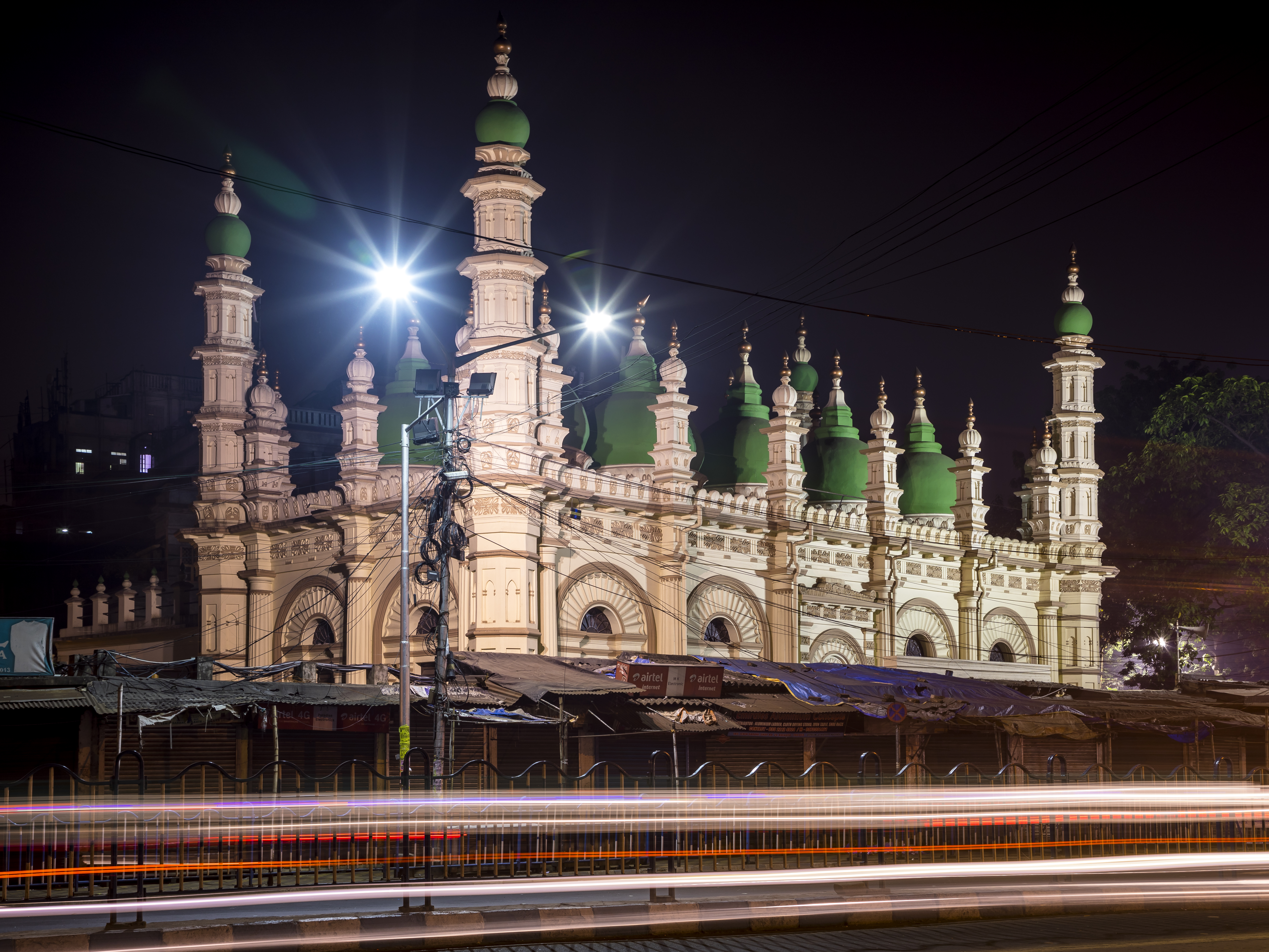
Tipu Sultan Mosque

== See also ==
- Metropolitan Building
