= List of accidents and incidents involving Sri Lanka Air Force aircraft =

List of accidents and incidents involving Sri Lanka Air Force aircraft

== 1960s ==
- 1 February 1960: A BAC Jet Provost crashed into the Negombo lagoon following a flame out, with its pilot, pilot officer Noel H. Lokuge safely ejecting.
- 1960: a BAC Jet Provost crashed into the coconut trees surrounding RCyAF Katunayake, killing Flight Sergeant Shayir Sally.

== 1970s ==
- 12 April 1971: A BAC Jet Provost lost power and crashed on its approach to RCyAF Chinabay, following a bombing run. Its pilot Sergeant pilot Ranjith Wijetunga was killed.

== 1990s ==
- 28,29 April 1995: two Hawker Siddeley HS 748 were shot down near Palay by SA-7 anti-aircraft missiles, the shot downs cost the lives of 43 in the first shootdown and 52 in the second shootdown.
- 22 January 1996: a Mil Mi-17 helicopter crashed into sea near Vettilakerny. 39 crew and passengers were reported missing.
- 7 December 1996: a Bell 212 landed in enemy controlled territory due to technical problems; crew and passengers, including General Anuruddha Ratwatte, Deputy Defence Minister evacuated and aircraft destroyed by the Sri Lanka Army.
- 20 January 1997: a Y-12 crashed, killing four.
- 21 January 1997: a IAI Kfir crashed into the Negombo lagoon. Pilot ejected safely.
- 21 February 1997: a Antonov An-32B crashed at Ratmalana airport following aborted take-off, killing four.
- 15 March 1997: a FMA IA 58 Pucará crashed in the Kaudala area following a premature explosion of ordinance on release. Pilot ejected and was recovered.

== 2000s ==
- 16 September 2000: a Mil Mi-17 helicopter crashed on Bible Rock, killing all 17 passengers and crew, including M. H. M. Ashraff, Minister of Shipping, Ports and Rehabilitation.
- 9 June 2004: A Mikoyan MiG-27 crashed into the Negombo Lagoon. The pilot ejected seconds before impact.
- 30 September 2005: A Mil Mi-24 helicopter was damaged in an accident at Ampara Airport.
- 1 March 2007: a PT-6 trainer aircraft crashed near SLAF Anuradhapura. Both the trainer and the instructor was killed.
- 27 November 2009: A Mil Mi-24 crashed in Buttala in the Monaragala district killing all 4 on board.

== 2010s ==
- 1 March 2011: Two IAI Kfirs crashed in Yakkala following a mid-air collision. Flight Lieutenant Monath Perera was killed, while Squadron Leader Vajira Jayakody ejected safely.
- 13 February 2012: a Mikoyan MiG-27 crashed while on a training mission, the pilot safely ejected.
- 12 December 2014: An Antonov An-32 crashed near Athurugiriya whilst on a routine flight from SLAF Katunayake to SLAF Ratmalana. Four members of the crew, including the pilots Squadron Leader J.M.W.N. Abeywardena and Flight Lieutenant A.A.D.T. Amaratunge were killed, while the fifth crewmen was rescued with critical injuries.
- 28 April 2016: A Bell 206 was damaged due to a hard landing at Hingurakgoda Airport during a training session. The trainee cadet pilot and instructor pilot were not injured.
- 25 May 2016: A Bell 206 crashed at Hingurakgoda Airport. The pilot survived.
- 29 May 2017: A Mil Mi-17 helicopter crashed near Baddegama during rescue and relief operations. All crew members survived, unhurt.

== 2020s ==
- 3 January 2020: A Harbin Y-12 crashed in Haputale during a routine flight. All 4 occupants on board were unfortunately killed.
- 15 December 2020: A Chinese-manufactured PT-6, a primary trainer aircraft, which took off from China Bay Airport crashed near Kantale, Sri Lanka killing the trainee pilot on board.
- 27 April 2022: A Bell 206 was involved in an accident at Hingurakgoda Airport. The pilot was unhurt and the helicopter was heavily damaged.
- 7 August 2023: A Chinese-manufactured PT-6, a primary trainer aircraft, crashed shortly after departing from China Bay Airport, resulting in the fatalities of the two officers who were on board. Following this incident, the Sri Lanka Air Force grounded the entire PT-6 aircraft fleet until a thorough investigation is conducted and completed.
- 12 January 2024: A Mil Mi-17 helicopter, deployed for UN peacekeeping operations in the Central African Republic as part of MINUSCA, crash-landed northeast of Bria due to adverse weather conditions. The pilot and the four crew members emerged unharmed from the incident.
- 21 March 2025: A K-8 trainer aircraft crashed near Minuwangete in the Wariyapola area. Both pilots ejected safely and were uninjured.
- 9 May 2025: A Bell 212 helicopter crashed into the Maduru Oya Reservoir. Twelve individuals were on board, including two pilots. Six personnel were killed in the incident, comprising four from the Sri Lanka Army and two from the Air Force.
- 30 November 2025– A Bell 212 helicopter engaged in disaster relief operations following Cyclone Ditwah crash-landed in an area between Wennappuwa and Lunuwila. All five crew members on board were rescued and taken to hospital for treatment. The pilot of the helicopter subsequently succumbed to his injuries.

== See also ==
- List of aviation accidents and incidents in Sri Lanka
