= List of aviation accidents and incidents in Sri Lanka =

This article lists some of the aviation accidents and incidents in Sri Lanka from the 1910s to the 2020s.

== 1910s ==
- In November 1911, an aircraft that was trying the establish the record for the first flight over Ceylon, hit the Old Royal College Building when it was under construction. The aircraft landed and later reattempted the record.

== 1950s ==
- February 19, 1954, a De Havilland Canada DHC-1 Chipmunk of the Ceylon Air Academy took off from Ratmalana Airport on a solo flight crashed into the sea. Despite an extensive search, no trace of the aircraft or its pilot was ever found.

== 1960s ==
- On February 1, 1960, a Jet Provost of the Royal Ceylon Air Force preparing for the fly past on Independence Day flamed out shortly after take-off. The pilot ejected safely and the plane crashed into the Negombo Lagoon.
- January 17, 1966, A Jet provost crashed into the coconut trees surrounding Katunayake airport, killing its pilot Flt Sgt Shaheer Sally.

== 1970s ==
- April 12, 1971, a Jet Provost of the Royal Ceylon Air Force crashed in Trincomalee killing its pilot.
- December 4, 1974, the Martinair Flight 138, a Douglas DC-8 crashed into a mountain on approach to Colombo International Airport, killing all 191 people aboard.
- November 15, 1978, the Icelandic Airlines Flight 001, a Douglas DC-8 crashed on approach to Colombo International Airport, killing 8 of the 13 Icelandic crew members, 5 reserve crew members and 170 (mostly Indonesian) out of a total of 262 passengers and crew.

== 1980s ==
- On 27 May 1984, a Sri Lanka Air Force Bell 206 helicopter crashed into a lake near Batticaloa. Two pilots killed.
- On 30 November 1984, a Sri Lanka Air Force Bell 206 helicopter crashed into the water near Mandaitivu, Jaffna during a night aerial reconnaissance mission. The pilot didn't survive and three others escaped.
- On 14 September 1985, a Sri Lanka Air Force Bell 212 helicopter crashed in Mutur, Trincomalee after a possible enemy attack while in flight. There were no fatalities.
- On 26 March 1986, a Sri Lanka Air Force SIAI-Marchetti SF.260 crashed into the sea off Beruwala, Kalutara during a training exercise. Sadly the pilot and officer cadet on board did not survive.
- On 3 May 1986, Air Lanka Flight 512 which was a Lockheed L-1011 Tristar that was about to depart to Maldives, having been delayed, was ripped in two by a bomb placed by the LTTE in the 'Fly Away Kit', killing 21 people and wounding 41.
- On 30 September 1986, a Sri Lanka Air Force Bell 212 helicopter was damaged during a brownout landing in which it subsequently struck trees and crashed. No fatalities.
- On 3rd June 1988, a Sri Lanka Air Force Bell 212 helicopter crashed near Kimbulapitiya, Gampaha after it hit high tension wires in poor visibility conditions and bad weather. One pilot did not survive.

== 1990s ==
- On 5 May 1990, a Sri Lanka Air Force Bell 212 helicopter crashed into the jungle in Sigiriya, Matale due to fuel starvation while on a search operation. All six on board were unfortunately killed in the accident.
- On 17 June 1990, a Sri Lanka Air Force aircraft crashed in Vavuniya in which one occupant didn't survive. No further details available.
- On 13 September 1990, a Sri Lanka Air Force SIAI-Marchetti SF.260 was shot down by LTTE anti-aircraft fire and crashed into the Jaffna Lagoon. The pilot was unfortunately killed.
- On 16 June 1991, a Sri Lanka Air Force Bell 212 helicopter crashed near Vavuniya after being attacked by the LTTE. One officer lost his life.
- On 5 July 1992, a Sri Lanka Air Force Shaanxi Y-8 transport aircraft crashed in Iyakachchi, Kilinochchi while en route to Palaly Airport, Jaffna from Ratmalana Airport, Colombo which sadly killed all 18 on board. The aircraft was carrying a large quantity of ammunitions and explosives for the ongoing military operations and while en route the back ramp door was opened by the crew to drop "home made" barrel bombs and one of the bombs exploded as it left the aircraft. It broke off the aircraft tail section which fell on enemy territory overhead Iyakachchi. The aircraft continued to fly a bit further and broke up into two and crashed (according to eye witnesses). .
- On 14 July 1992, a Sri Lanka Air Force SIAI-Marchetti SF.260 was shot down by LTTE terrorists near Palaly, Jaffna. The pilot was killed.
- On 9 November 1992, a Sri Lanka Air Force Bell 206 helicopter was shot down by LTTE terrorists over Ampara. Pilot killed.
- On 2 August 1994, a Sri Lanka Air Force Bell 212 helicopter was destroyed at Palaly Airport after being hit by a RPG from LTTE attack on the air base that day.
- On 28 April 1995, a Sri Lanka Air Force Avro HS 748 was shot down by the LTTE terrorists using a man-portable air-defense system (MANPADS) near Palaly Airport, Jaffna killing all 47 crew and passengers.
- On 29 April 1995, a second Sri Lanka Air Force Avro HS 748 was shot down by the LTTE using a man-portable air-defense system (MANPADS) Palaly Airport, Jaffna killing all 50 crew and passengers.
- On 14 July 1995, a Sri Lanka Air Force FMA IA 58 Pucará was shot down by the LTTE using a MANPADS during fierce fighting near Jaffna, killing its pilot.
- On 13 September 1995, a Sri Lanka Air Force Antonov An-32 transport aircraft crashed into the sea off Ja-Ela, Colombo which sadly killed all 75 on board.
- On 18 November 1995, a Sri Lanka Air Force Shaanxi Y-8 transport aircraft was shot down by LTTE terrorists while on final approach to Palaly Airport, Jaffna. The plane crashed into the sea north of the airport which killed 5 of the 6 on board.
- On 22 November 1995, a Sri Lanka Air Force Antonov An-32 transport aircraft crashed into the sea off Karainagar, Jaffna. All 63 on board were killed unfortunately.
- On 22 January 1996, a Sri Lanka Air Force Mil Mi-17 helicopter crashed into the sea off Point Pedro, Jaffna which tragically killed all 39 on board. It is suspected to have been shot down by the LTTE.
- On 23 September 1996, a Sri Lanka Air Force SIAI-Marchetti SF.260 was involved in a training accident. No fatalities.
- On 7 December 1996, a Sri Lanka Air Force Bell 212 helicopter force landed on territory controlled by the LTTE north of Vavuniya due to low fuel and was subsequently destroyed on the ground. The helicopter was transporting some VIPs at the time, all of whom reached government controlled areas without harm.
- On 20 January 1997, a Sri Lanka Air Force Harbin Y-12 went missing over the sea off north-eastern Sri Lanka. The aircraft is believed to have been shot down but no trace of it or the four occupants on board were ever found.
- On 21 January 1997, a Sri Lanka Air Force IAI Kfir fighter jet crashed into the Negombo Lagoon shortly after taking off from Bandaranaike International Airport. The pilot ejected.
- On 21 February 1997, a Sri Lanka Air Force Antonov An-32 transport aircraft overran the runway at Ratmalana Airport during take off and crashed into a marshy patch. Three occupants were killed.
- On 6 March 1997, a Sri Lanka Air Force Harbin Y-12 was destroyed at China Bay Airport, Trincomalee due to a mortar attack launched at the airport by the LTTE.
- On 15 March 1997, a Sri Lanka Air Force FMA IA 58 Pucará suffered a midair explosion from the aircraft while on a night air assault mission (requested by the Sri Lanka Army) targeting an enemy gathering. The pilot safely ejected.
- On 19 March 1997, a Sri Lanka Air Force Mil Mi-24 helicopter crashed into the water near Chalai, Mullaitivu. All 8 on board killed. It is believed to have been shot down. The wreckage of the helicopter was retrieved from the sea by Sri Lanka Navy in May 2014.
- On 21 April 1997, a Sri Lanka Air Force Antonov An-32 transport aircraft was badly damaged in a landing accident at Ratmalana Airport in bad weather conditions. There were no injuries. The aircraft was later repaired.
- On 14 June 1997, a Sri Lanka Air Force SIAI-Marchetti SF.260 crash landed during a training flight after an engine failure near Talawa, Anuradhapura. The instructor was killed and the cadet pilot survived with injuries.
- On 13 September 1997, a Sri Lanka Air Force Mil Mi-24 helicopter was damaged by LTTE gunfire near Puliyankulam, Vavuniya and made a hard landing with partially extended landing gears in friendly territory.
- On 10 November 1997, a Sri Lanka Air Force Mil Mi-24 helicopter was shot down while escorting three Mil Mi-17s to Elephant Pass. One Mi-17 was damaged by the missile attack but managed to safely land at Elephant Pass. The Mi-24 went down into the Kokkilai Lagoon, Mullaitivu which sadly killed two occupants.
- On 25 November 1997, a Sri Lanka Air Force Bell 212 helicopter engaged in a MEDEVAC mission crashed near Puliyankulam, Vavuniya which sadly killed all four on board.
- On 2 January 1998, a Sri Lanka Air Force Mil Mi-17 helicopter was shot down by the LTTE while attempting to evacuate injured soldiers near Mankulam, Mullaitivu. The helicopter was destroyed. No fatalities.
- On 26 June 1998, a Sri Lanka Air Force Mil Mi-24 helicopter crashed at Kachchankulam, Vavuniya during a mission. All four on board killed. It is said to have been caused by a technical fault.
- On 29 September 1998, a Gomelavia Antonov An-24RV, operating as Lionair Flight 602 was shot down by LTTE terrorists using a man-portable air-defense system (MANPADS) off Iranativu, Gulf of Mannar, killing all 7 crew and 48 passengers.
- On 17 December 1999, a Sri Lanka Air Force Mil Mi-24 helicopter was shot down by LTTE terrorists near Vettilaikerny, Jaffna in which it crashed into the water and killed all four on board.

== 2000s ==
- On 17 February 2000, a Sri Lanka Air Force Bell 212 helicopter engaged in a CASEVAC mission was shot down by LTTE terrorists near Chavakachcheri, Jaffna which killed the co-pilot and a gunner. Five survived the crash.
- On 24 March 2000, an Antey Airlines Antonov An-12 transport/cargo aircraft, chartered by Sky Cabs from Russia, from Bangkok, Thailand to Colombo, Sri lanka crashed in Kadirana near Bandaranaike International Airport. After two unsuccessful ILS approaches to runway 04 the aircraft ran out of fuel during the third attempt when heading to get established on the ILS to runway 22. The aircraft crashed into a residential area where it destroyed and damaged several houses. Six of the eight occupants from the aircraft and as well as three people on the ground were killed.
- On 30 March 2000, an AAR Airlines Antonov An-26 transport aircraft, chartered by the Sri Lanka Air Force from Ukraine, was shot down by LTTE terrorists who fired a missile using a MANPADS from the Wilpattu National Park. The aircraft subsequently crashed near Anuradhapura which unfortunately killed all 40 on board.
- On 24 May 2000, a Sri Lanka Air Force Mil Mi-24 helicopter was shot down by LTTE terrorists near Kodikamam, Jaffna. Sadly both gunners were killed, but both pilots survived.
- On 23 July 2000, a Sri Lanka Air Force Chengdu F-7 fighter jet crash landed at Bandaranaike International Airport. The pilot ejected safely.
- On 16 September 2000, a Sri Lanka Air Force Mil Mi-17 helicopter crashed at Urakanda, near Aranayaka in the Kegalle district killing all 15 passengers and crew, including M. H. M. Ashraff, Minister of Shipping, Ports and Rehabilitation.
- On 18 October 2000, a Sri Lanka Air Force Mil Mi-24 helicopter was shot down by LTTE terrorists near Nagar Kovil, Jaffna. The helicopter reportedly crashed landed in an area held by Sri Lanka security forces and the crew escaped.
- On 23 October 2000, a Sri Lanka Air Force Mil Mi-24 helicopter was shot down by LTTE terrorists and crashed into Koddiyar Bay, Trincomalee which unfortunately killed all four on board.
- In June 2001, a C-152 crashed with in Katukurunda Air training base on final approach from a cross country flight the PIC Commercial pilot license holder who was the instructor at time way injured and wash rushed to the base hospital.
- On 15 June 2001, a Sri Lanka Air Force Mil Mi-24 helicopter crash landed after an engine failure near Minneriya, Polonnaruwa. Both pilots survived.
- On 24 July 2001, A LTTE terrorist attack on Bandaranaike International Airport, resulted in the destruction 8 SLAF aircraft and 3 SriLankan Airlines Airbus A330s and Airbus A340s.
- On 18 August 2001, a Sri Lanka Air Force MiG-27 fighter jet crashed near Bandaranaike International Airport, killing its Ukrainian pilot. Two Ukrainian pilot instructors, training Sri Lanka Air Force pilots and attached to SLAF base Katunayake, wanted to mark the Ukrainian Aviation Day with a flypast. That was to include some aerial stunts over Katunayake skies. They had been airborne and were engaged in aerobatics when one of the MiG-27s did a loop and was trying to level off when it struck telephone wires and hit the ground close to the Colombo-Negombo road at the 18th mile post and careered through a two storied house. Both the jet and the house were destroyed.
- On 15 August 2002, a Sri Lanka Air Force Shaanxi Y-8 transport aircraft crashed in Kalutara during a test flight due to engine trouble. Unfortunately all five personnel did not survive.
- On 22 October 2002, a Sri Lanka Air Force IAI Kfir fighter jet crashed in Kuliyapitiya, Kurunegala due to a reported engine failure. The pilot successfully ejected.
- On 14 June 2003, a Sri Lanka Air Force Antonov An-32 transport aircraft crashed following a runway excursion at Palaly Airport in Jaffna. There were no fatalities.
- On 4 Feb 2004, a Phoenix Aviation Ilyushin Il-18, a cargo flight chartered by ExpoAir from Dubai to Colombo, landed on the grass patch parallel to runway 04 at Bandaranaike International Airport, and eventually came to a stop on the runway. The landing caused heavy structural damages to aircraft, rendering it beyond economical repair, and certain damages to the aerodrome equipment. There were four cockpit crew and three ground crew onboard, and no injuries reported.
- On 9 June 2004, a Sri Lanka Air Force MiG-27 fighter jet crashed into the Negombo Lagoon shortly after taking off from Bandaranaike International Airport. The pilot successfully ejected from the aircraft.
- On 30 September 2005, a Sri Lanka Air Force Mil Mi-24 helicopter was damaged in an accident at Ampara Airport.
- On 1 March 2007, a Sri Lanka Air Force PT-6 trainer aircraft crashed shortly after takeoff from Anuradhapura Airport. Both pilot and trainee died in the crash.
- On 29 March 2007, a Sri Lanka Air Force Bell 206 was damaged due to a hard landing by a student pilot.
- On 22 October 2007, a raid on SLAF Anuradhapura by LTTE resulted in 8 SLAF aircraft being destroyed on the ground and another 10 damaged. A Sri Lanka Air Force Bell 212 that was deployed for air defense during the attack crashed as well unfortunately killing its crew.
- On 6 July 2008, a Sri Lanka Air Force MiG-27 fighter jet was damaged due to a belly landing at Bandaranaike International Airport.
- On 27 November 2009, a Sri Lanka Air Force Mil Mi-24 crashed in Buttala in the Monaragala district killing all 4 on board.

== 2010s ==
- On 1 March 2011, Two IAI Kfir fighter jets on rehearsal for the Sri Lanka Air Force's 60th Anniversary airshow flypast resulted in a mid air collision. Pilots of both aircraft ejected but one of the pilots were killed.
- On 13 February 2012, a Sri Lanka Air Force MiG-27 fighter jet crashed in Dummalasuriya, Puttlam while on a routine training flight. The pilot managed to eject from the jet without sustaining injuries.
- On 2 July 2013, a SriLankan Airlines Airbus A340 was involved in a serious incident at Bandaranaike International Airport where it suffered a hard landing and Tailstrike after a flight from Riyadh, Saudi Arabia. The aircraft's aft fuselage belly suffered minor damages as a result.
- On 14 June 2014, a Cessna 152 operated by Millennium Flight Academy landed at Ratmalana Airport without its left landing gear. It had detached earlier in the flight when it hit a high tension power line when flying low over Paragasthota, Kalutara according to the investigation later conducted.
- On 12 December 2014, a Sri Lanka Air Force, Antonov An-32 transport aircraft carrying 5 people crashed in Hokandara, Colombo while on approach to Ratmalana Airport in poor visibility. The pilot, co-pilot and two of the air crew were killed in the crash and the fifth crew member suffered critical injuries and later died of his injuries.
- On 28 April 2016, a Sri Lanka Air Force Bell 206 was damaged due to a hard landing at Hingurakgoda Airport during a training session. The trainee cadet pilot and instructor pilot were not injured.
- On 25 May 2016, a Sri Lanka Air Force Bell 206 crashed at Hingurakgoda Airport during take off. The pilot survived.
- On 7 October 2016, a Cinnamon Air Cessna 208 Caravan amphibian aircraft landed at Bandaranaike International Airport without its landing gear extended. The aircraft landed on its floats which damaged them.
- On 29 May 2017, a Sri Lanka Air Force Mil Mi-17 helicopter crash landed into flood water near Baddegama during rescue and relief operations. All crew members survived, unhurt.
- On 26 December 2018, an Antonov An-12 cargo aircraft operated by Cavok Air was preparing for departure to Salalah, Oman from Mattala Rajapaksa International Airport when on of its engines caught on fire while on the apron. The airport fire services were able to quickly extinguish the fire preventing it from causing further damage.
- On 23 October 2019, a Cessna 152 operated by Fairway Aviation Academy suffered a Bird strike to the left wing, which caused a significant inward dent to it, at Weerawila. The aircraft subsequently landed at Weerawila Airport in the Hambantota District.

== 2020s ==
- On 3 January 2020, a Sri Lanka Air Force Harbin Y-12 aircraft on a surveillance mission crashed into mountainous terrain near Haputale, Badulla. All four occupants died in the crash. One person on the ground was injured as a result of the crash.
- On 15 December 2020, a Sri Lanka Air Force PT-6 trainer aircraft crashed in Kantale, Trincomalee during a solo training flight after losing contact with ATC. The pilot succumbed to injuries sustained during the crash.
- On 30 March 2021, a Cessna 152 operated by FitsAir Flight Academy was damaged during a landing incident at Ratmalana Airport. The nose landing gear collapsed and separated from the aircraft in which it subsequently tilted forward and caused the propeller to strike the ground damaging it as well. The student pilot was not injured.
- On 27 December 2021, a Cessna 172 operated by Sakurai Aviation crash landed in a paddy field near Kimbulapitiya, Gampaha after the aircraft suffered an engine RPM fluctuation and subsequent engine failure. Three of the four occupants were injured.
- On 27 April 2022, a Sri Lanka Air Force Bell 206 was involved in a landing accident at Hingurakgoda Airport. The pilot was unhurt and the helicopter was heavily damaged.
- On 7 August 2023, a Sri Lanka Air Force PT-6 trainer aircraft crashed during a training flight two minutes after taking off from the air force academy at China Bay base in the eastern city of Trincomalee. Both the pilot and the flight engineer were killed in the crash.
- On 12 November 2024, a Sri Lanka Air Force Bell 206 suffered structural damages to the airframe due to a hard landing at Hingurakgoda Airport.
- On 21 March 2025, a Sri Lanka Air Force K-8 trainer aircraft crashed near Minuwangete in the Wariyapola area. Both pilots ejected safely and were uninjured.
- On 9 May 2025, a Sri Lanka Air Force Bell 212 helicopter crashed into the Maduru Oya Reservoir. Twelve individuals were on board, including two pilots. Six personnel were killed in the incident, comprising four from the Sri Lanka Army and two from the Air Force.
- On 30 November 2025, a Sri Lanka Air Force Bell 212 helicopter engaged in disaster relief operations following Cyclone Ditwah crash-landed into the Gin Oya near the Lunuwila bridge in Puttalam. All five crew members on board were rescued and taken to hospital for treatment. The pilot of the helicopter subsequently succumbed to his injuries.
- On 7 January 2026, a Cessna 208 Caravan amphibian aircraft operated by Cinnamon Air, was involved in a water landing accident at Lake Gregory Waterdrome in Nuwara Eliya. The aircraft was substantially damaged as a result. No passengers were on board and the two pilots were injured but rescued safely.
- On 25 August 2026, a Cessna 152 training aircraft operated by Fly Southern was substantially damaged during a hard landing accident at Ratmalana Airport. The nose landing gear had broken off, and the propeller had struck the ground, damaging it as well. The student pilot on board was not injured.
