= Army Training School (Sri Lanka) =

Army Training School of Sri Lanka Army

- Active: 1985-Present
- Country: Sri Lanka
- Branch: Sri Lanka Army
- Type: Training
- Role: Recruit training, Infantry battalion training
- Size: Multi Battalion
- Part of: Army Training Command
- Garrison/HQ: Maduru Oya
- Nickname(s): ATS
- Motto(s): "Excellence though the training"

Commanders
- Current commander: Lt. Col. J. C. Premathilaka USP psc

Location of ATC

The Army Training School (ATS) (Sinhala: යුද්ධ හමුදා පුහුණු පාසල, romanized: yuddha hamudā puhuṇu pāsala) is a unit of the Sri Lanka Army responsible for recruit training and unit training for infantry battalion. It is based in Maduruoya it was established in 1985 at the Panagoda Cantonment by the Sri Lanka Light Infantry as the Recruit Training School under the command of Major A. K. Jayawardana SLLI.

In late 1984 the unit took over premises built for the Maduruoya Irrigation Project, and from 1986 began unit training of infantry battalions on both on site and at other locations.

== History ==
The ATS went through its embryonic stages at 1 Sri lanka Light Infantry premises before been moved to the present environs. Infrastructure facilities were available at Maduruoya in the complex built by the Canadian company FAFJ; which was a venture set up to construct the Maduru Oya dam.

On 14 January 1985 the Army Training School was established under Lt Col P. W. J. de Silva SLLI who is the first commandant of the school. Though the infrastructure facilities were available for the staff and the trainers it was decided to build a dormitory to accommodate 500 recruits and firing ranges utilizing the capital votes with the help of academic headquarters.

A model town was constructed in the vicinity of ATS in mid-1986, to enable troops to conduct training in Fighting in Built up and in streets; and the first FIBUA training programme was commenced in December 1986 with the assistants of Israelis and it is the only range and the place available to conduct this form of training in Sri Lanka even today.

At present with limited facilities available ATS has undertaken the training of two Infantry battalions simultaneously, and the Young Officers have been trained All Arms before been posted to units. Recently, the ATS has undertaken the training potential battalion commanders in order to develop their ability to command and to qualify them to achieve the goals of the organization.

== Courses ==
Courses conducted by Army Training Center;

- Young officer's course
- Infantry battalion training
- Special Infantry Operation course
- Senior non-commissioned officers course
- Non-commissioned officers course
- Battalion Training Instructor Refresher course
- Instructor Refresher course

== See also ==
- Sri Lankan military academies
- Sri Lanka Army
