= Special Infantry Operation Team =

Sri Lanka Military Units

Special Infantry Operation Teams
- Country: Sri Lanka
- Allegiance: Sri Lanka
- Type: Shock Troops
- Role: Unconventional warfare Jungle warfare Patrolling; Reconnaissance
- Part of: Sri Lanka Army

Special Infantry Operation Teams or SIO Teams are special operations capable reconnaissance teams present in every infantry battalion of the Sri Lanka Army. They act as shock troops and spearhead assaults ahead of the battalion.

== History ==
Following its setbacks in the Eelam War III, during the ceasefire agreement from 2002 to 2006, the Sri Lanka Army adopted a change in its doctrine of deploying infantry in battalion formations when engaging the LTTE in future battles with introduction of the concept of Special Infantry Operation Teams (SIOT). Selected candidates who had undergone a 44-day advanced platoon training course, continued with the SIOT course for additional weeks covering three months gaining skills in combined arms, joint warfare, and real-life exercises inclusive of close air support. These SIOTs were then spread out through the infantry battalions, with each company having six SIOTs, who would pass on their skills as instructors, leading to a mark improvement of infantry skills in all formations, with to some infantry companies consisting of SIO qualified personal. Battalion commanders were thus able to dominate a broad front with a depth of over 4-5 kilometers. With the onset of the Eelam War IV, the army found itself in a high state of moral and an infantry adapted to jungle warfare, willing to fight at night which had been limited to its special forces till then.

== Training ==
Each Special Infantry Operation (SIO) Course consists of sections made up of an officer, sergeant and seven privates selected by their parent infantry battalion to be trained as a team. The SIO course has multiple legs with specialist training carried out at several training establishments:

- Sri Lanka Signal Corps Training School - field communications
- Sri Lanka School of Military Engineering - assault pioneer
- School of Artillery - target acquisition
- Marksman Sniper Training School - marksmanship
- Sri Lanka Army Medical Corps - first aid
- Sri Lanka Air Force - forward air control

Thereafter, the tactics leg of the course which takes 40 days is conducted at the Army Training School in Maduru Oya.

On completion of the course participants are awarded the Qualification Badge for Special Infantry Operation Training. SIO teams wear SIO tab on combat uniforms.

== See also ==
- Ghatak Platoon
- Ranger Regiment (United Kingdom)
