= 2011 Sri Lanka Kfir mid-air collision =

Aviation incident in Sri Lanka

- Crash site of one of the Kfirs

Accident
- Date: 1 March 2011; 15 years ago
- Summary: Mid-air collision
- Site: Yakkala, Gampaha, Sri Lanka
- Total fatalities: 1
- Total survivors: 1

First aircraft
- Type: IAI Kfir C2
- Operator: Sri Lanka Air Force
- Registration: SFM-5201; 163 (MSN)
- Flight origin: Bandaranaike International Airport, Sri Lanka
- Fatalities: 0
- Survivors: 1

Second aircraft
- Type: IAI Kfir C2
- Operator: Sri Lanka Air Force
- Registration: SFM-5202; 161 (MSN)
- Flight origin: Bandaranaike International Airport, Sri Lanka
- Fatalities: 1
- Survivors: 0

On 01 March 2011, two IAI Kfirs belonging to the No. 10 Squadron at SLAF Katunayake, collided near Yakkala, Gampaha, approximately 19 kilometres (11.8 mi) south-east of SLAF Katunayake, during a formation fight rehearsal.

== Accident ==
The two Kfirs from No. 10 Squadron were conducting final rehearsals for the flypast scheduled for the next day, as part of the SLAF's 60th-anniversary celebrations, with their routine involving a low-flying circuit over the SLAF base at Ratmalana before returning to Katunayake on 01 March 2011, when they collided at 9.30 am (local time). The incident took place roughly 6 kilometres (3.7 mi) off Yakkala.

Both pilots ejected from their aircraft. Squadron Leader Jayakody's parachute deployed successfully, allowing him to land safely in a paddy field. However, Flight Lieutenant Perera's parachute failed to open, and he succumbed to injuries upon impacting a coconut tree.

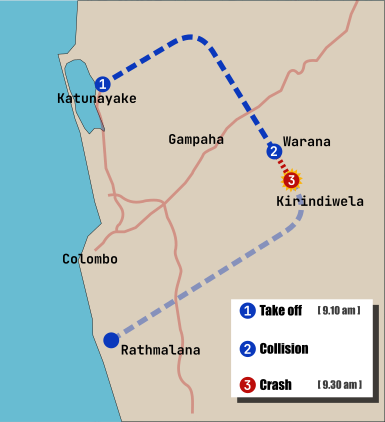
An illustration of the incident
