= Maduru Oya Solar Power Station =

Proposed solar power station on Maduru Oya Reservoir, Sri Lanka

- Country: Sri Lanka
- Location: Maduru Oya Dam
- Coordinates: 7°37′10″N 81°12′10″E
- Status: Under construction
- Construction began: 2019

Solar farm
- Type: Standard PV
- Site area: 500 acres (200 ha)

Power generation
- Nameplate capacity: 100 MW

The Maduru Oya Solar Power Station is a proposed 100 megawatt floating solar photovoltaic power station to be built over 500 acres (2.0 km^{2}) - or 2%, of the Maduru Oya Reservoir. Following the cabinet approval in 2017, the Ministry of Science and Technology allocated Rs. 80 million (about US$ 522,000) for obtaining the required equipment for a prototype training project.

On 9 April 2019, the Ministry of Power and Renewable Energy and the Canadian Commercial Corporation signed a memorandum of cooperation for the joint development of the facility, which is expected to complete by November 2019. The power station is also expected to be the first such facility to utilise energy storage in the country.

== See also ==
- List of power stations in Sri Lanka
