= Monath Perera =

Personal details
- Born: 13 October 1982 Galle, Sri Lanka
- Died: 1 March 2011 (aged 28) Yakkala, Sri Lanka

Squadron Leader Monath Erash Perera was a fighter pilot who served in the No. 10 Squadron of the Sri Lanka Air Force.

== Biography ==
Born on 13 October 1982 in Galle, he completed his education at Mahinda College in Galle. Perera joined the Sri Lanka Air Force on 1 August 2004 and was commissioned as a pilot officer in July 2005. He played a major role during the final phase of the Sri Lankan Civil War, having joined the jet squadron to fly the Kfirs in 2007. Perera, who was promoted to the rank of flight lieutenant in 2010, had completed 450 air time hours and participated in 75 operations during his period of service.

On March 1 2011, Perera was killed in a mid-air collision. He was flying as number 2 of a two-ship formation of Kfir fighter jets belonging to No. 10 Squadron SLAF based at SLAF Base Katunayake, which were enroute to fly the final rehearsal of the 60th Anniversary of the Sri Lankan Air Force. Although Perera was able to eject, his parachute malfunctioned and he fell to his death. The wreckage of both planes crashed near Yakkala in the Gampaha District. He was posthumously promoted to the rank of squadron leader for his contribution to several Sri Lankan military operations during the civil war. The other pilot in the collision, Squadron Leader Vajira Jayakody, also ejected from his stricken Kfir and parachuted to the ground without incident.
