= 29 April 1995 Sri Lanka Air Force Avro 748 shootdown =

Aviation incident in Sri Lanka

1995 Sri Lanka Air Force Avro 748 shootdown
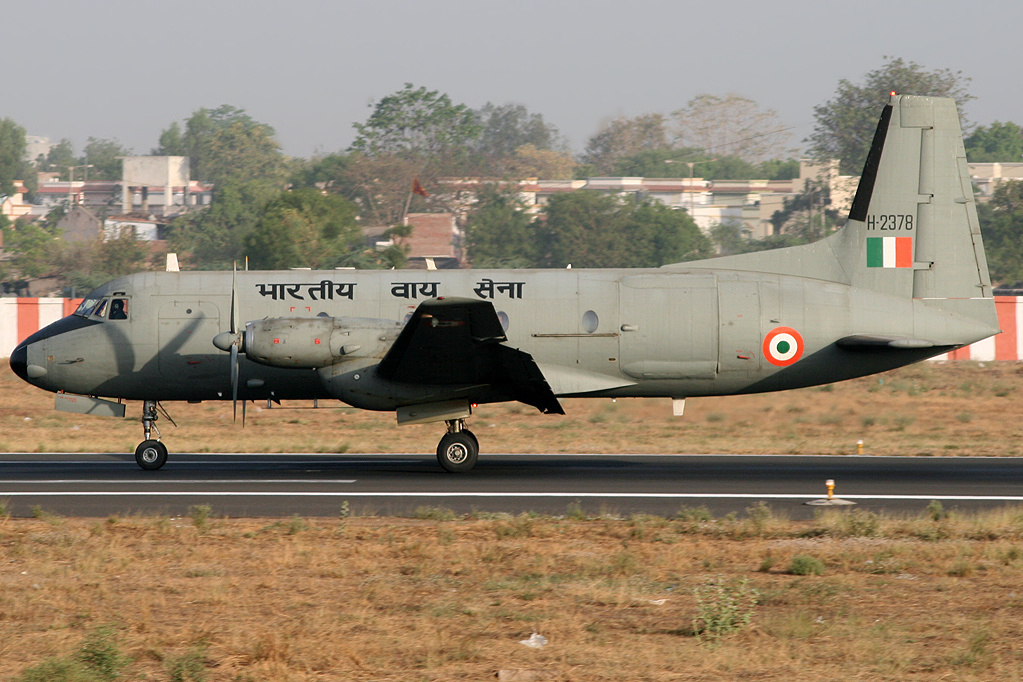
- An Avro 748 similar to the aircraft shot down

Accident
- Date: April 29, 1995
- Summary: Shot down by Liberation Tigers of Tamil Eelam (LTTE) guerillas using a MANPAD (SA-7)
- Site: near Jaffna-Palaly AFB (JAF); 9°47′23″N 80°4′16″E

Aircraft
- Aircraft type: Avro 748-357 Srs.2B SCD
- Operator: Sri Lanka Air Force
- Registration: CR834 (4R-HVA)
- Flight origin: Ratmalana Airport
- Stopover: Anuradhapura Airport
- Destination: SLAF Palaly
- Occupants: 52
- Passengers: 49
- Crew: 3
- Fatalities: 52
- Survivors: 0

A Sri Lanka Air Force Avro 748-357 Srs.2B SCD airliner was shot down on 29 April 1995 by a SA-7 missile fired by the Liberation Tigers of Tamil Eelam (LTTE), while it was on approach to land at SLAF Palaly from Ratmalana Airport. All 52 crew and passengers were killed.

The day before the incident SLAF Avro 748 serial number CR835 crashed in the sea near Palaly Airport soon after takeoff. Initially the official cause was stated as engine trouble even though there was consideration that there was the possibility of a missile attack. The SLAF dispatched an investigation team to Palaly on the next scheduled flight from Ratmalana Airport to Palaly via Anuradapura Airport. CR834 was piloted by Wing Commander Shirantha Goonatilake, (Commanding Officer No. 1 Flying Training Wing), including: Wing Commander D. S. Wickremesinghe, Wing Commander Sujeewa Pathiratne (Designated Captain of the flight) and Wing Commander Kamal Welgama who made up the crash investigation team. On the morning of 29 April 1995 the flight reached Palaly and began its approach to land when it crashed into the sea killing all on board. The last communication was when Wing Commander Goonatilake radioed "A missile is coming on my way". This gave the SLAF the first indication that the LTTE had acquired and had started using MANPADS against their aircraft with CR835 becoming the first victim and CR834 a second.

The introduction of MANPADS by the LTTE against the SLAF marked a major shift of strategy by the LTTE in the onset of the Eelam War III. The acquisition of ex-Soviet 9K32 Strela-2s during the peace talks. SLAF aircraft were not equipped with warning systems or counter measures to defend them from surface-to-air missiles. Due to the loss of two aircraft with close to 100 officers and men killed, including five senior officers of the SLAF coupled with suspension of all flights to Jaffna, the two incidents had a major impact on the moral of the Sri Lankan armed forces. The No. 5 "Jet" Squadron responded with an attack sortie by two of its F-7 Skybolts led by its commanding officer, Squadron Leader Harsha Abeywickrama and his wing man Flying Officer Janaka Wijetilleke on LTTE targets in front lines which ensured SLAF air operations over LTTE controlled areas would continue even with the SAM threat. In the long run SLAF would lose several more aircraft and was forced to retire its fleet of SIAI Marchetti SF.260 and FMA IA 58 Pucará counter-insurgency aircraft replacing them with IAI Kfirs.

== See also ==
- List of aviation accidents and incidents in Sri Lanka
- 1995 Sri Lanka Air Force Avro 748 (CR835) shootdown
- Lionair Flight 602
