= No. 10 Squadron SLAF =

No. 10 Fighter Squadron
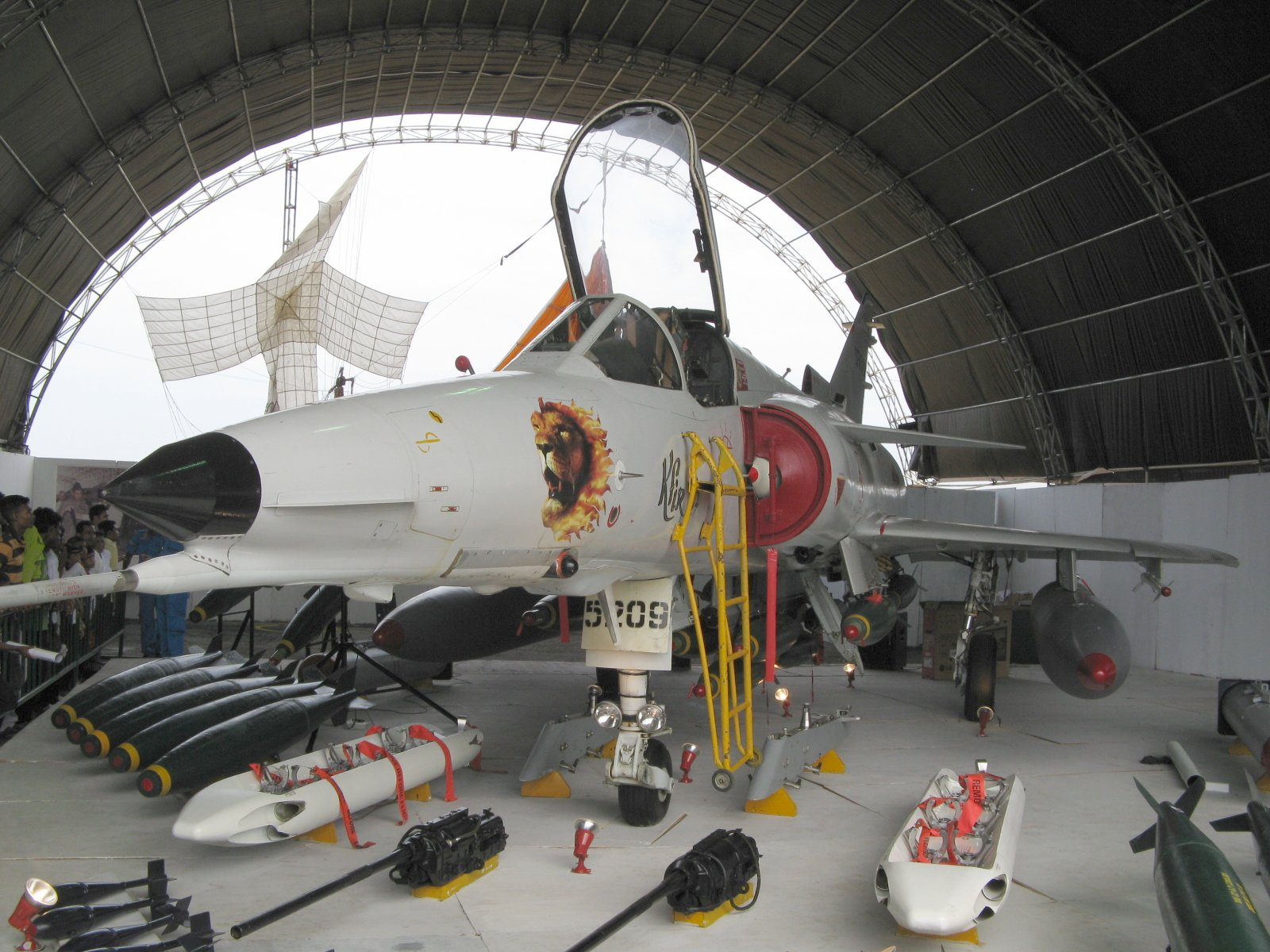
- An IAI Kfir of the No. 10 "Fighter" Squadron
- Active: January 5, 1996 - to present day
- Country: Sri Lanka
- Branch: Sri Lanka Air Force
- Role: Offensive Support, Air Defence
- Station: SLAF Katunayake
- Nickname: Kfir Squadron
- Mottos: total success in operations during day and night with right attitude, right training and full-time readiness
- Equipment: IAI Kfir
- Engagements: Sri Lankan Civil War
- Decorations: 3 Weera Wickrama Vibhushanaya

Commanders
- Commanding Officer: Group Captain Prabath Wijekoon

No. 10 "Fighter" Squadron is a squadron of the Sri Lanka Air Force. It currently operates the IAI Kfir from SLAF Katunayake. The squadron is tasked with providing offensive support for ground & maritime (anti-shipping) operations, air interdiction and interception. It specializes in high altitude precision ground attacks.

== History ==
The squadron was formed on January 5, 1996 at the SLAF Katunayake with six IAI Kfir multi-role fighter jets acquired from Israel, with US State Department approval. These included five C2 types and a TC.2 type trainer. At its formation the squadron had six pilots, four engineers and 70 technicians along with the six aircraft. In 2000, the squadron received eight more Kfirs that included C7 types and another trainer.

On November 2, 2007 the Sri Lankan Air Force claimed that aircraft from the squadron killed the LTTE’s Political Wing Leader S.P. Thamilselvan and a group of LTTE cadres in an air raid. During the last phase of the war it maintained units at SLAF China Bay.

In March 2009, the squadron was presented with the President’s Colours.

By 2017 only one Kfir was serviceable out of 7 while Mig 23 and Mig 27 of the No. 12 Squadron grounded in the same year.

In 2021 the government approved a US$49 million deal with Israel Aerospace Industries to update the remaining five Kfirs to Block 60 standard. In June 2026, the first upgraded Kfir was inducted into service, incorporating 4+ generation capabilities in accordance with the C12 standard.

== Aircraft operated ==
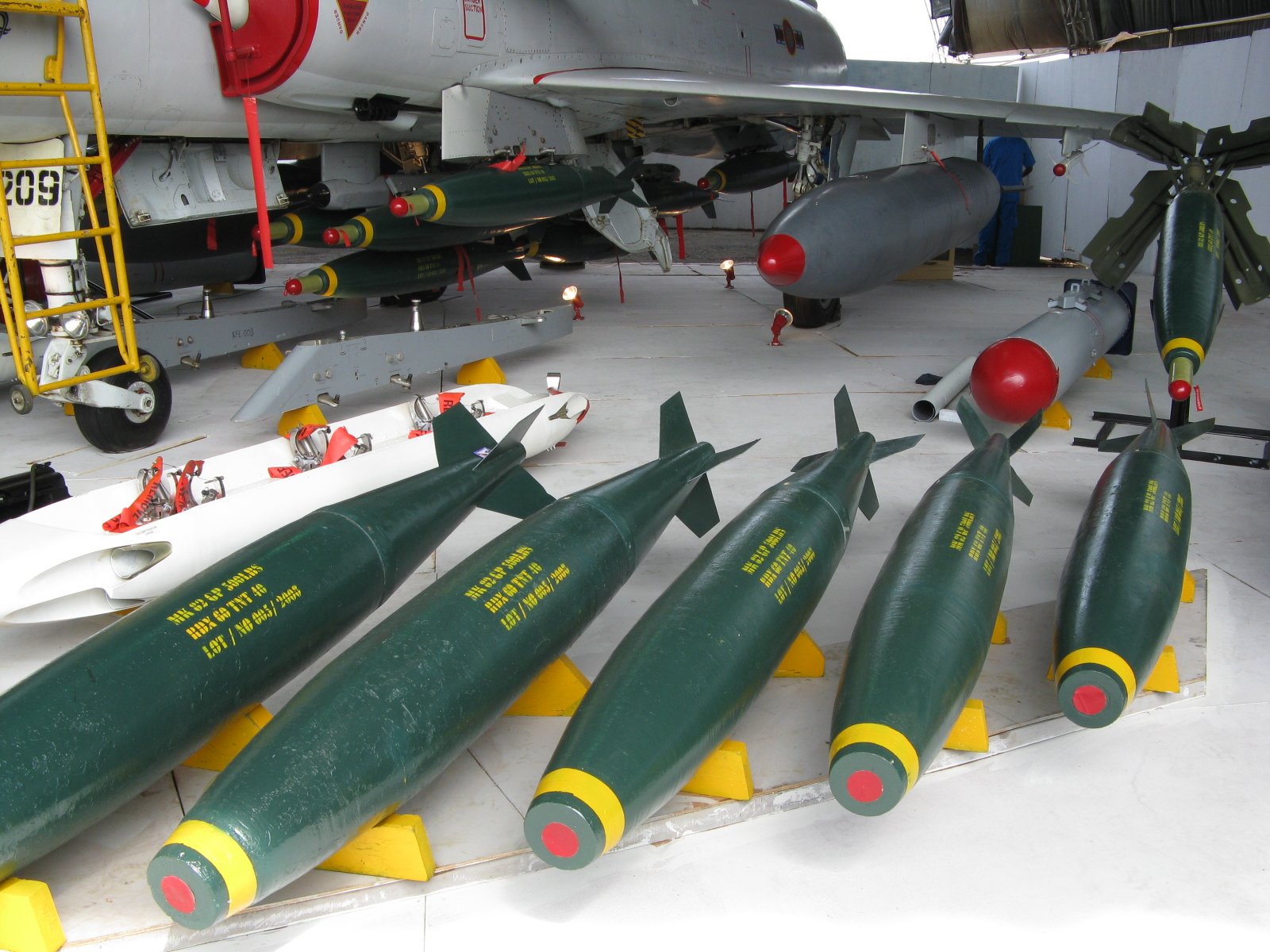
Kfir Ammunition on display

Year of introduction

- IAI Kfir C2 - 1996
- IAI Kfir TC2 - 1996
- IAI Kfir C7 - 2000
- IAI kfir C12 - 2026

== Notable members ==
- Monath Perera
