= 2000 SLAF Mi-17 crash =

2000 helicopter crash in Sri Lanka

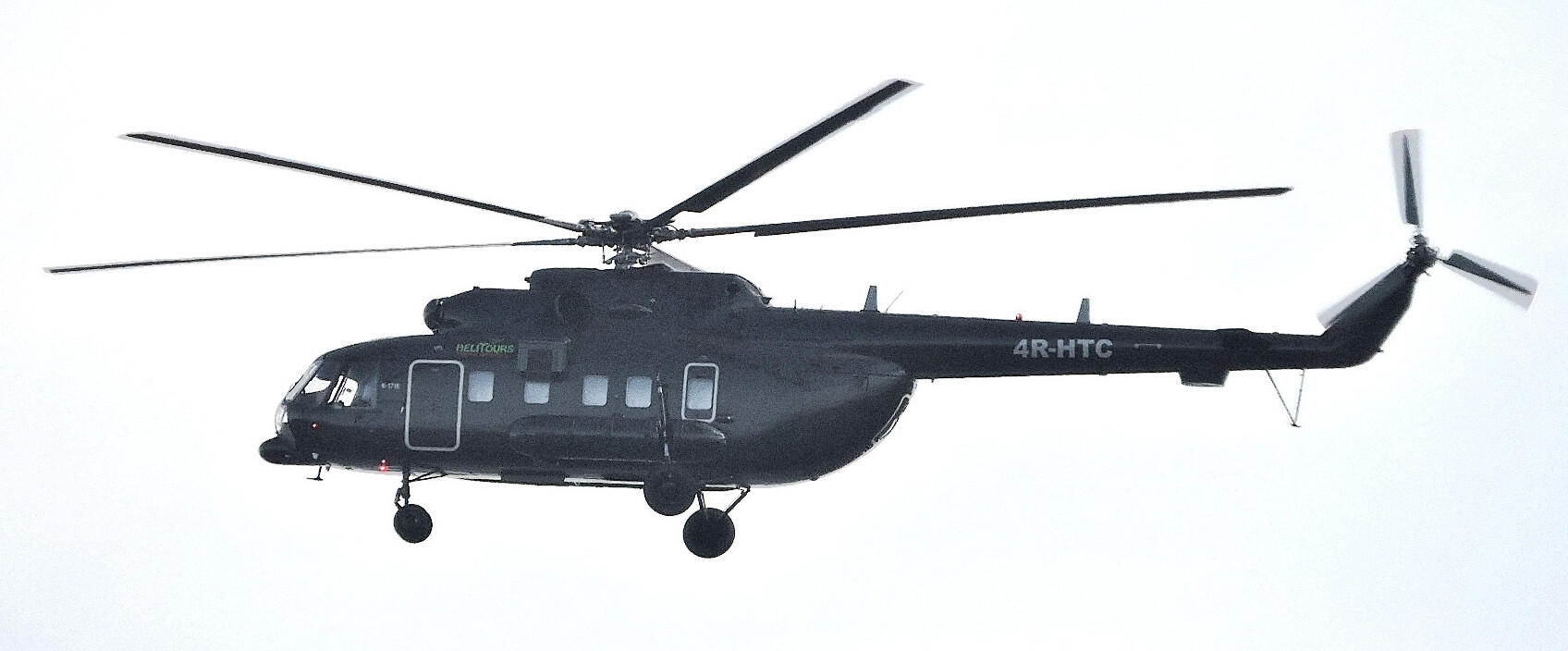
- A Sri Lankan Mil Mi-17, similar to the one involved

Accident
- Date: 16 September 2000
- Summary: Crashed into terrain due to technical failure
- Site: Urakanda, Kegalle, Sri Lanka

Aircraft
- Aircraft type: Mil Mi-17
- Operator: Sri Lanka Air Force
- Registration: CH592
- Flight origin: Police Grounds, Bambalapitiya
- Destination: Ampara Airport, Ampara
- Passengers: 13
- Crew: 2
- Fatalities: 15
- Survivors: 0

On 16 September 2000, a Mil Mi-17 transport helicopter operated by the Sri Lanka Air Force crashed on the Urakanda mountain range near Aranayaka, in the Kegalle District, after departing Bambalapitiya Police Grounds. The helicopter was carrying Minister of Shipping, Ports and Rehabilitation M. H. M. Ashraff and 14 others. Everyone on board was killed.

== Aircraft and crew ==
The Russian-built Mil Mi-17 helicopter was operated by the No. 4 (VVIP/VIP) Helicopter Squadron at SLAF Ratmalana.

Squadron Leader Shiran Perera was the pilot in command.
