= 2020 SLAF Y-12 Crash =

Aviation accident in Sri Lanka

SCL-857 Crash
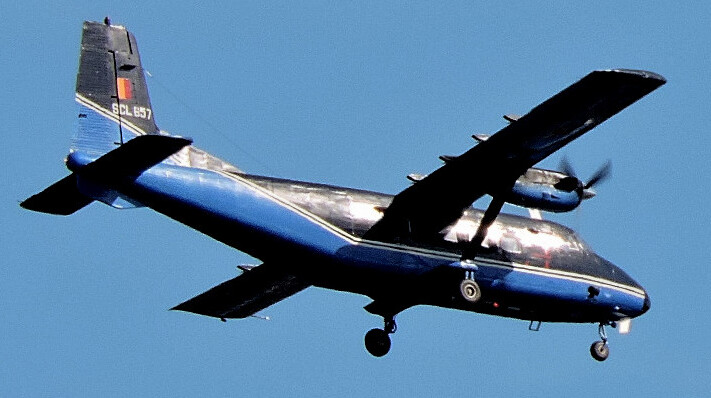
- SCL-857, the aircraft involved in the accident, at 2017 Independence Day flypast

Accident
- Date: 3 January 2020
- Site: Thambapillai area, Haputale, Sri Lanka; 6°45′52.315″N 80°57′6.782″E

Aircraft
- Aircraft type: Harbin Y-12
- Operator: Sri Lanka Air Force
- Registration: SCL-857; 0021 (MSN)
- Flight origin: Ratmalana Airport, Colombo, Sri Lanka
- Stopover: Weerawila Airport, Weerawila, Sri Lanka
- Destination: Ratmalana Airport, Colombo, Sri Lanka
- Crew: 4
- Fatalities: 4
- Survivors: 0

Ground casualties
- Ground injuries: 1

On 3 January 2020, a Sri Lanka Air Force Harbin Y-12, flying from Weerawila to Colombo, crashed into a mountainous terrain near Haputale, during a surveillance mission, killing all 4 personnel on board.

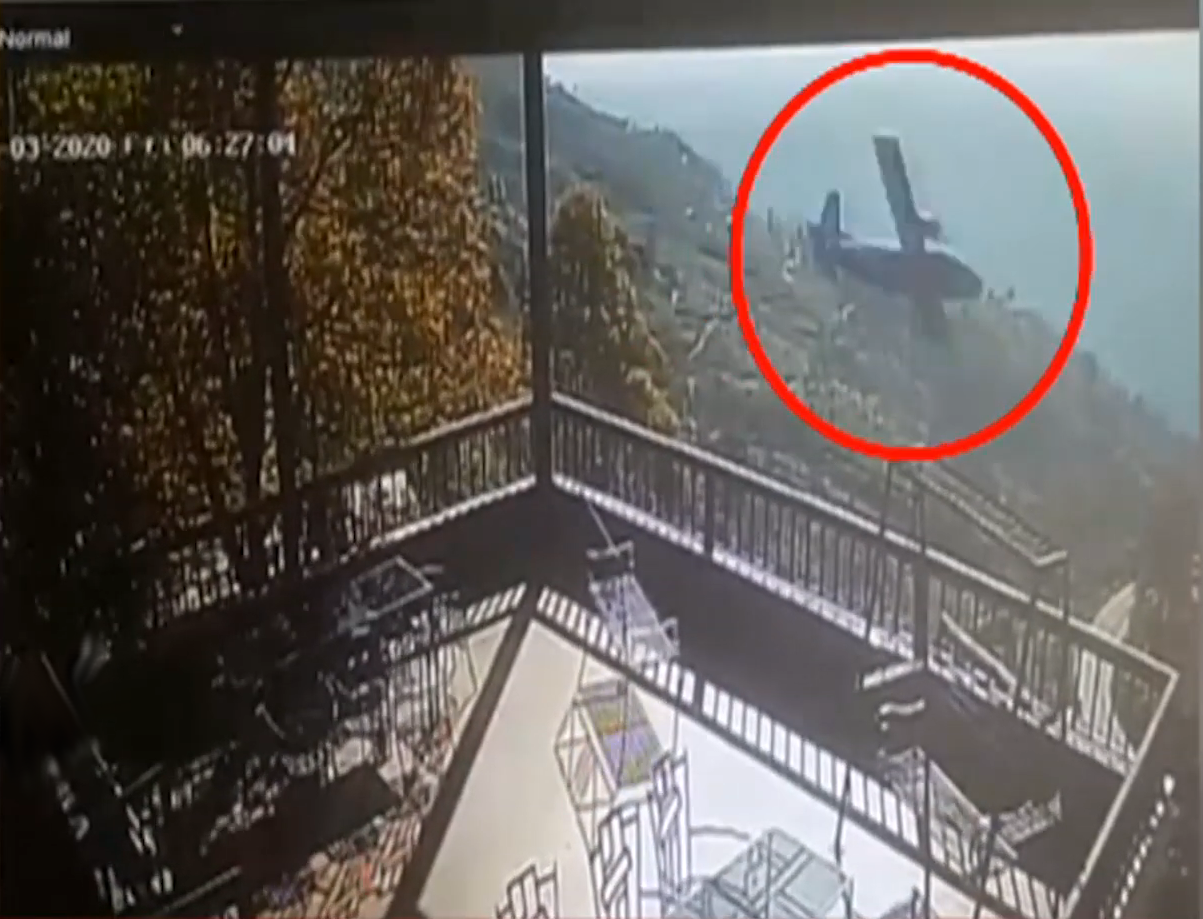
A CCTV still of the aircraft flying low, seconds before the crash

== Background ==
=== Purpose of the flight ===
The flight was a routine surveillance mission conducted by the Air Force to support law enforcement by identifying cannabis plantations.

=== Aircraft and crew ===
The aircraft involved in the accident, manufactured in 1990, was a thirty-year-old twin-engine turboprop Harbin Y-12 registered as SCL-857. The aircraft was operated by the No. 8 Squadron at SLAF Katunayake.

The crew consisted of the pilot-in-command, Squadron Leader Buddhi Weebedda, the co-pilot, Flight Lieutenant Lankapura Kulatunga, Sergeant Wasantha Kumara and Leading Aircraftman Nuwan Hettiarachchi.

== Accident ==
At 07:00 AM local time, the aircraft departed from Ratmalana Airport with only two pilots on board. At 08:00 AM, it landed at Weerawila Airport. The aircraft then departed Weerawila at 08:55 AM with two more airmen aboard, heading towards the upcountry region.

The aircraft crashed at 09:15 local time (04:45 UTC) in the Haputale, Sri Lanka. The crash site was 65 kilometers (35 nmi) north of Weerawila, and near the village of Ayspeella. All four Air Force personnel who were onboard were killed. One Person injured on the ground as consequence of the crash.

== See also ==
- List of aviation accidents and incidents in Sri Lanka
