= Maduru Oya Dam =

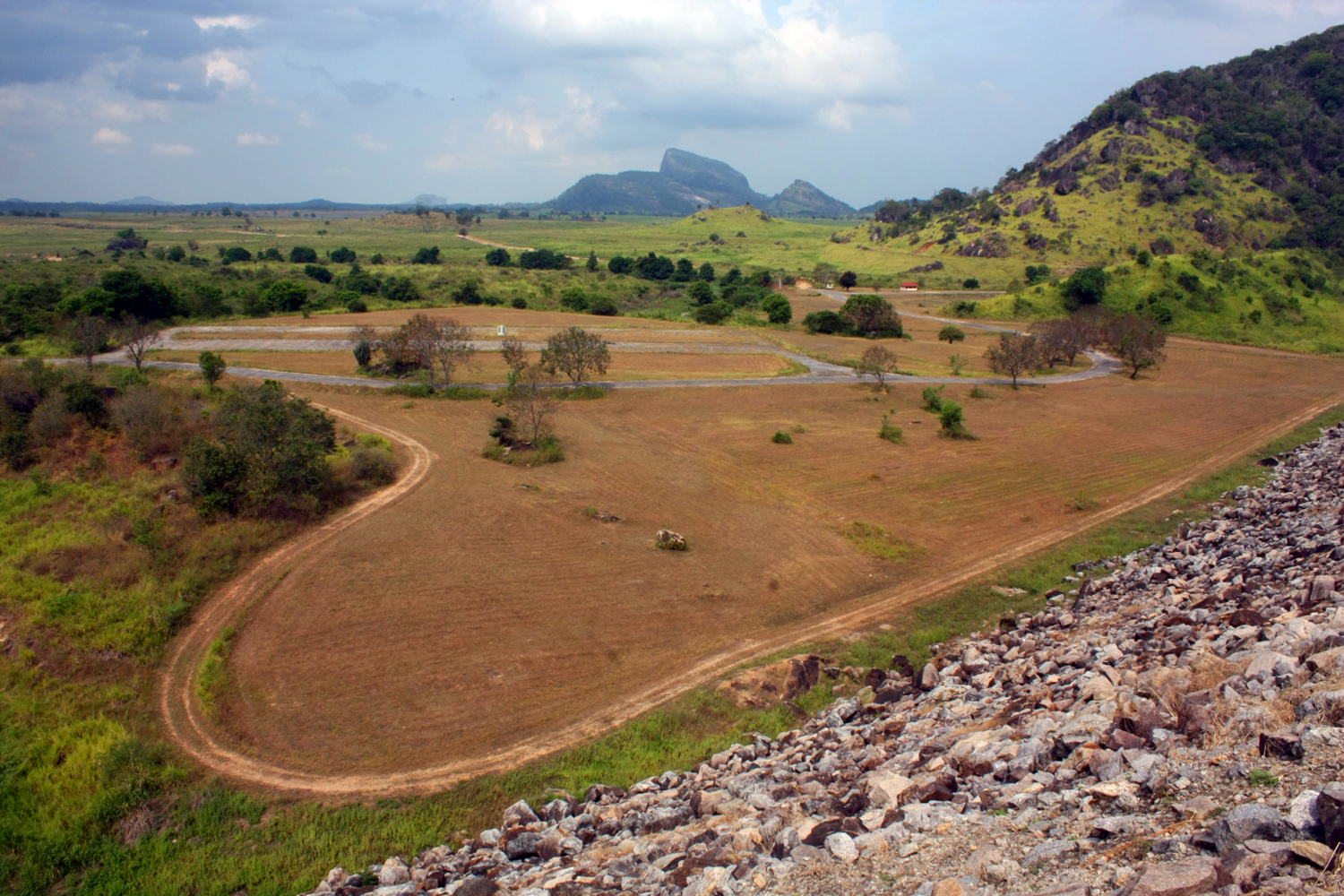
- Downstream view of the Maduru Oya Dam
- Interactive map of Maduru Oya Dam
- Country: Sri Lanka
- Location: Eastern Province
- Coordinates: 07°38′53″N 81°12′50″E
- Purpose: Irrigation
- Status: Operational
- Owner: Mahaweli Authority

Dam and spillways
- Type of dam: Embankment dam
- Impounds: Maduru Oya
- Height (foundation): 41 m (135 ft)
- Length: 1,090 m (3,580 ft)

Reservoir
- Creates: Maduru Oya Reservoir
- Total capacity: 596,000,000 cubic metres (2.10×10^{10} ft^{3})
- Catchment area: 453 km^{2} (175 mi^{2})

The Maduru Oya Dam is an irrigation dam built across the Maduru Oya. The embankment dam measures 1,090 m (3,580 ft) in length, 41 m (135 ft) in height, and creates the Maduru Oya Reservoir. The reservoir has a catchment area of 453 km^{2} (175 mi^{2}) and a storage capacity of 596,000,000 cubic metres (2.10×10^{10} ft^{3}) The proposed Maduru Oya Solar Power Station is to be built over the surface of the Maduru Oya reservoir.

== See also ==
- Maduru Oya National Park
