= 28 April 1995 Sri Lanka Air Force Avro 748 shootdown =

Aviation incident in Sri Lanka

1995 Sri Lanka Air Force Avro 748 shootdown
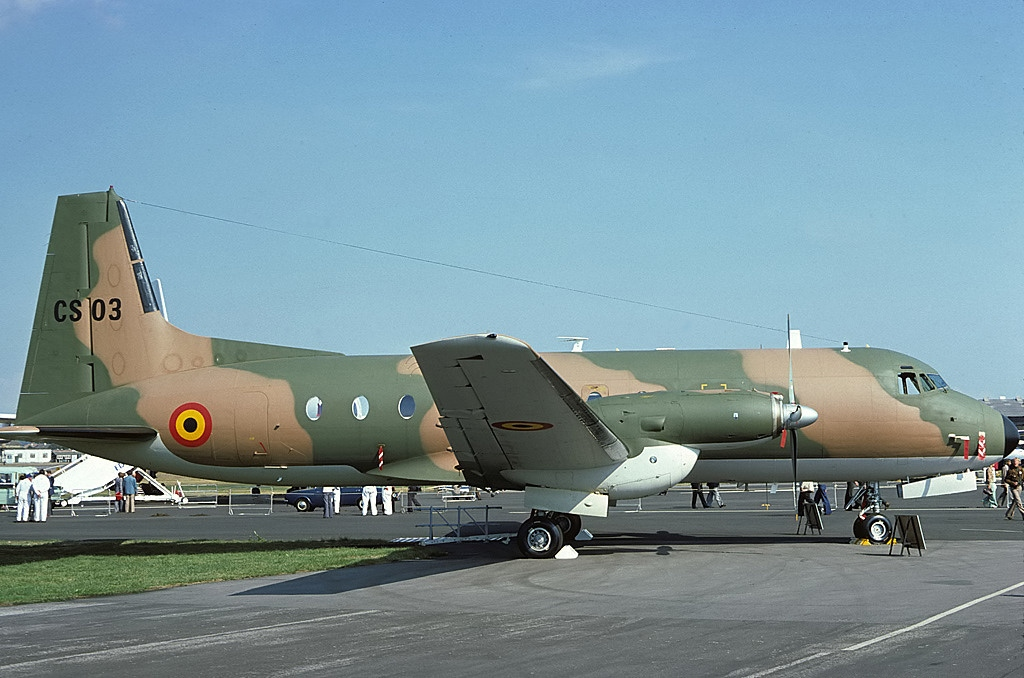
- An Avro 748 similar to the aircraft shot down

Shootdown
- Date: April 28, 1995
- Summary: Shot down by LTTE guerillas
- Site: 0.2 km (0.11 nmi; 0.12 mi) from Jaffna-Palaly AFB (JAF); 9°48′46″N 80°5′16″E

Aircraft
- Aircraft type: Avro 748-334 Srs. 2A
- Operator: Sri Lanka Air Force
- Registration: CR835 / 4R-HVB
- Flight origin: Jaffna International Airport
- Destination: Ratmalana Airport
- Occupants: 47
- Passengers: 43
- Crew: 4
- Fatalities: 47
- Survivors: 0

Sri Lanka Air Force Avro 748 CR835 was shot down on 28 April 1995 by a SA-7 missile fired by the LTTE. The plane, an Avro 748-334 Srs. 2A airliner, was en route to Ratmalana Airport and was shot down soon after take-off from SLAF Palaly. All 47 crew and passengers were killed.

Following the breakdown of peace talks and resumption of hostilities in April 1995, the Sri Lanka Air Force maintained its routine flights in and out of Jaffna from SLAF Palaly. As per schedule a SLAF Avro 748, serial no CR835 (4R-HVB), took off from SLAF Palaly on 28 April 1995, crashed into the sea, killing all 47 crew and passengers, which included Wing Commander Roger Weerasinghe, Northern Zonal Commander of the SLAF and four Sri Lanka Army personnel, who had been wounded in a LTTE attack on Kayts Island the previous day.

Soon after take-off in heavy rain, the No.2 engine caught fire, prompting a return to Palaly, but on final approach the right wing failed and the aircraft crashed into the sea.

Initial response of the Sri Lankan military and government was that the crash was due to engine trouble, however, the next day another Avro 748 which was sent with an investigation team was also shot down, prompting SLAF headquarters to state that both Avro 748s were shot down.

== See also ==
- 1995 Sri Lanka Air Force Avro 748 (CR834) shootdown
- Lionair Flight 602
