= Lunuwila =

Lunuwila ලුණුවිල
- town
- Location within Sri Lanka
- Coordinates: 07°20′37″N 79°51′42″E
- Country: Sri Lanka
- Province: North Western Province
- District: Puttalam District
- Time zone: UTC+5:30 (Sri Lanka Standard Time Zone)
  - Summer (DST): UTC+6 (Summer time)
- Postcode: 61150
- Area code: 043

Lunuwila (ලුණුවිල) is a town in the Puttalam District, North Western Province, Sri Lanka. It is approximately 5 km (3.1 mi) inland of the coastal town of Wennappuwa, 20 km (12 mi) north of Negombo and 30 km (19 mi) south of Chilaw.

The Coconut Research Institute of Sri Lanka, founded in 1929, is located on the Bandirippuwa Estate in Lunuwila.

== Transport ==
The town is on the intersection of the B473 (Wennappuwa - Kirimetiyana Road) and the Sirigampala Para.

The Lunuwila train station is the ninth station on the Puttalam rail line.

== See also ==
- Railway stations in Sri Lanka
