= Maduru Oya =

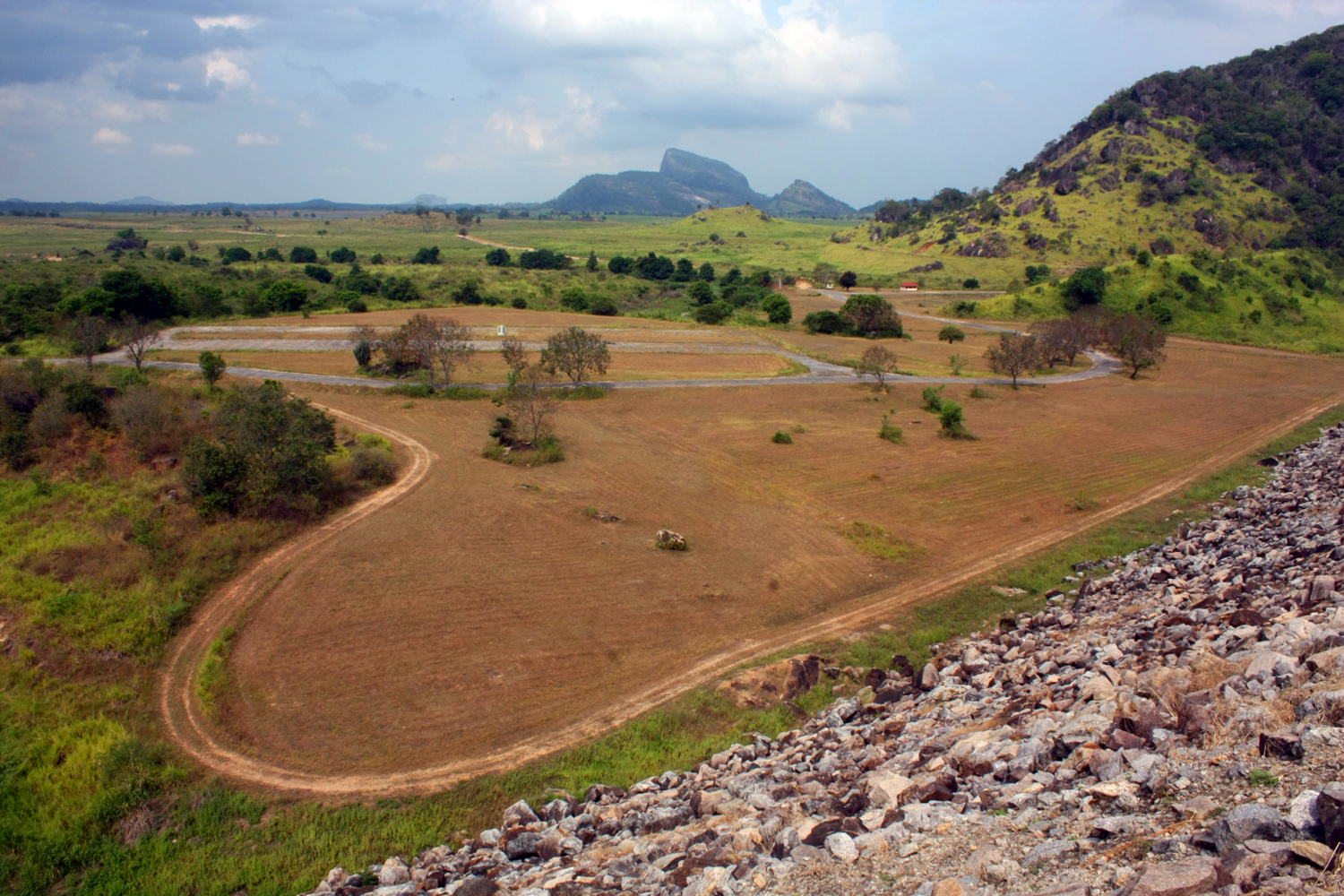
- Downstream view from the Maduru Oya Dam.

Physical characteristics
- Source
  - location: Maduru Oya National Park
- Mouth: Indian Ocean
  - location: Kalkudah
  - coordinates: 07°56′24″N 81°33′05″E
  - elevation: Sea level
- Length: 135 km (84 mi)

The Maduru Oya is a major stream in the North Central Province of Sri Lanka. It is approximately 135 km (84 mi) in length. Its catchment area receives approximately 3,060 million cubic metres of rain per year, and approximately 26 percent of the water reaches the sea, as it flows into the Indian Ocean. It has a catchment area of 1,541 square kilometres.

== See also ==
- List of dams and reservoirs in Sri Lanka
- List of rivers of Sri Lanka
