= IAI Kfir =

Israeli multirole combat aircraft

Kfir
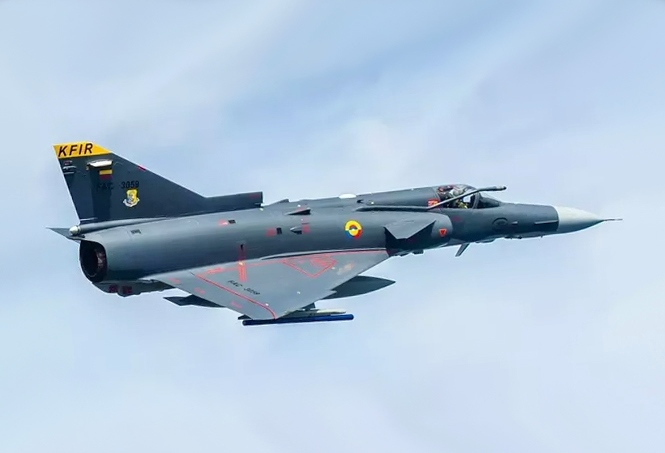
- A Colombian Aerospace Force Kfir, from the 111th Combat Squadron

General information
- Type: Fighter-bomber, multirole combat aircraft
- National origin: Israel
- Manufacturer: Israel Aircraft Industries
- Status: In service with Colombia and Sri Lanka
- Primary users: Israeli Air Force (historical) United States Navy (historical); Colombian Aerospace Force; Sri Lanka Air Force
- Number built: 220+

History
- Introduction date: 1976
- First flight: June 1973
- Developed from: Dassault Mirage 5 IAI Nesher
- Variant: IAI Nammer

The Israel Aircraft Industries Kfir (Hebrew: כְּפִיר, lit. 'Lion Cub') is an Israeli all-weather multirole combat aircraft based on the French Dassault Mirage 5, with Israeli avionics and an Israeli license-built version of the General Electric J79 turbojet engine (J79-J1E).

== Development ==
=== Background ===
The project that would ultimately give birth to the Kfir can be traced back to the IDF's need for adapting the Dassault Mirage IIIC to the specific requirements of the Israeli Air Force (IAF).

The all-weather, delta-winged Mirage IIICJ was the first Mach 2 aircraft acquired by Israel from then-close ally France, and constituted the backbone of the IAF during most of the 1960s, until the arrival of the Douglas A-4 Skyhawk and, more importantly, the McDonnell Douglas F-4 Phantom II, by the end of the decade. While the Mirage IIICJ proved to be extremely effective in the air-superiority role, its relatively short range imposed some limitations on its usefulness as a ground-attack aircraft.

Thus, in the mid-1960s, at the request of Israel, Dassault Aviation began developing the Mirage 5, a fair-weather, ground-attack version of the Mirage III. Following the suggestions made by the Israelis, advanced avionics located behind the cockpit were removed, allowing the aircraft to increase its fuel-carrying capacity while reducing maintenance costs.

By 1968, Dassault had finished production of the 50 Mirage 5Js paid for by Israel, but an arms embargo imposed upon Israel by the French government in 1967 prevented deliveries from taking place. The Israelis replied by producing an unlicensed copy of the Mirage 5, the Nesher, with technical specifications for both the airframe and the engine obtained by Israeli spies.

=== Design ===
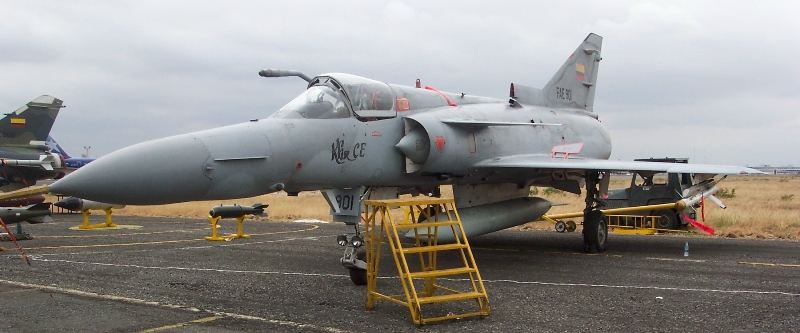
Ecuadorian Air Force Kfir CE (C.10), showing the refuelling probe and the longer nose of this variant

The Kfir programme originated in the quest to develop a more capable version of the IAI Nesher, which was already in series production. After Charles de Gaulle embargoed the sale of arms to Israel, the IAF feared that it might lose qualitative superiority over its adversaries in the future, which were receiving increasingly advanced Soviet aircraft. The main and most advanced type of aircraft available to the IAF was the Mirage, but a severe problem developed due to the Mirage fleet's depletion due to attrition after the Six-Day War. Domestic production would circumvent the embargo restrictions completely; efforts to reverse engineer and reproduce components of the Mirage were aided by Israeli espionage efforts to obtain technical assistance and blueprints from third party Mirage operators.

Two powerplants were initially selected for trials, the General Electric J79 turbojet and the Rolls-Royce Spey turbofan. In the end, the J79 was selected, not least because it was the same engine used on the McDonnell Douglas F-4 Phantom II, which the Israelis began to acquire from the United States in 1969, along with a license to produce the J79 themselves. The J79 was clearly superior to the original French Atar 09, providing a dry thrust of 49 kN (11,000 lbf)) and an afterburning thrust of 83.4 kN (18,700 lbf).

In order to accommodate the new powerplant on the Mirage III's airframe, and to deliver the added cooling required by the J79, the aircraft's rear fuselage was slightly shortened and widened, its air intakes were enlarged, and a large air inlet was installed at the base of the vertical stabilizer, so as to supply the extra cooling needed for the afterburner. The engine itself was encased in a titanium heatshield.

A two-seat Mirage IIIBJ fitted with the GE J79 made its first flight in September 1970, and was soon followed by a re-engined Nesher, which flew in September 1971.

An improved prototype of the aircraft, with the name Ra'am B ("Ra'am" means "Thunder"; the "Ra'am A" was the Nesher), made its first flight in June 1973. It had an extensively revised cockpit, a strengthened landing gear, and a considerable amount of Israeli-built avionics. The internal fuel tanks were slightly rearranged; their total capacity being increased to 713 US gal (2,700 L).

There were unconfirmed reports that a number of the original Mirage IIICs, re-engined with the J79 and given the name Barak ("Lightning"), took part in the Yom Kippur War of 1973, but some sources point out that there is no evidence that these aircraft ever existed.

== Operational history ==
=== Israel ===
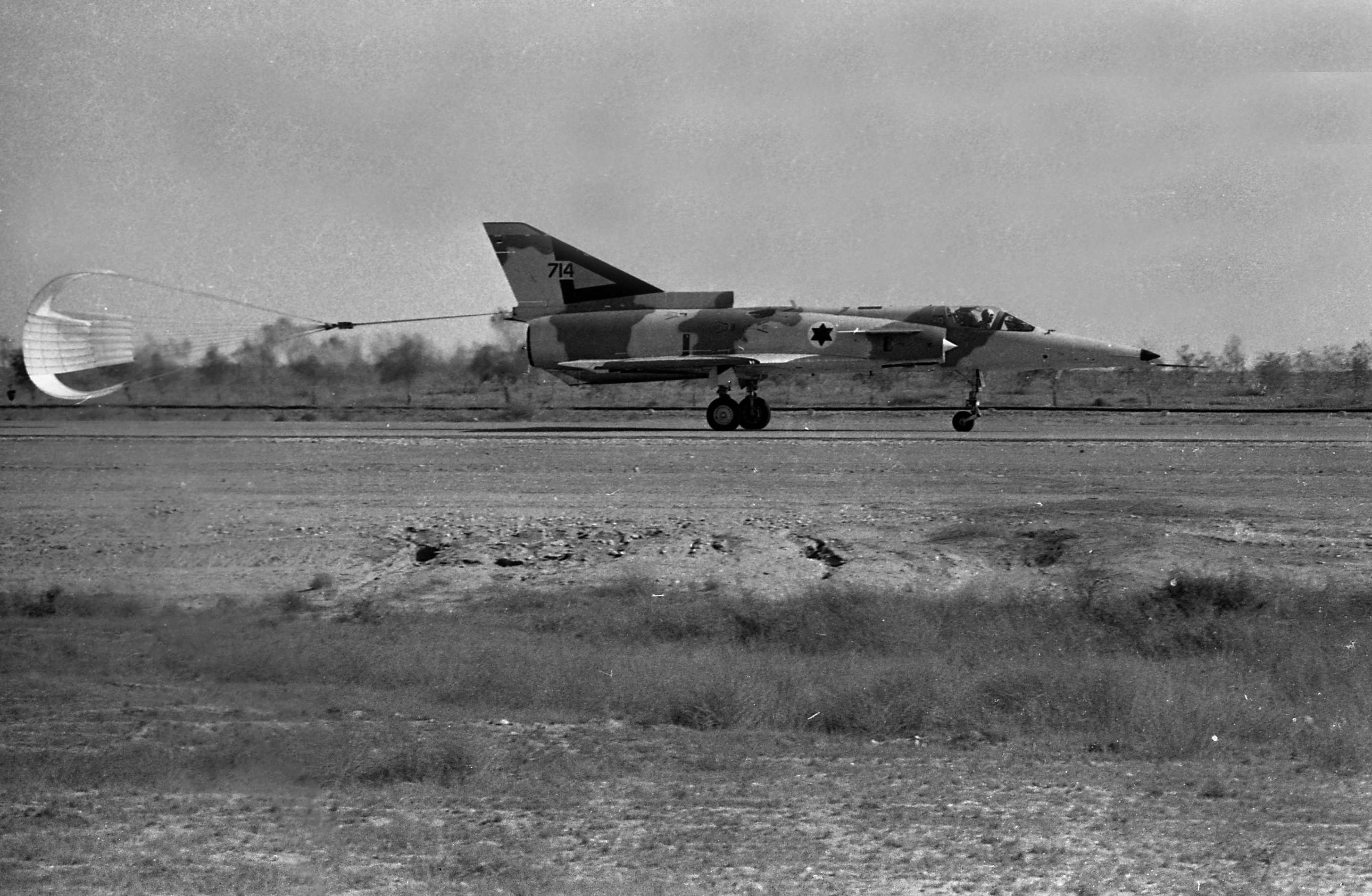
Israeli IAI Kfir in 1976

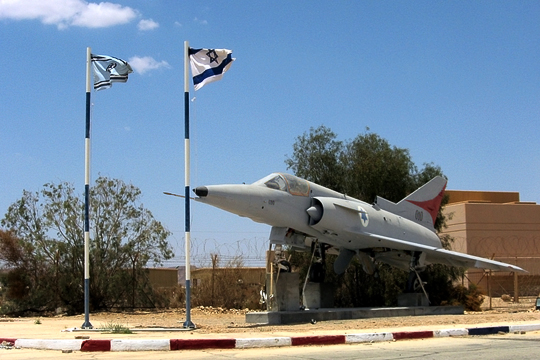
IAI Kfir C.1 at the entrance to Ovda Israeli Air Force Base

The Kfir entered service with the IAF in 1975, the first units being assigned to the 101st "First Fighter" Squadron. Over the following years, several other squadrons were also equipped with the new aircraft. The role of the Kfir as the IAF's primary air superiority asset was short-lived, as the first F-15 Eagle fighters from the United States were delivered to Israel in 1976.

The Kfir's first recorded combat action took place on November 9, 1977, during an Israeli air strike on a training camp at Tel Azia, in Lebanon. The only air victory claimed by a Kfir during its service with the IAF occurred on June 27, 1979, when a Kfir C.2 (piloted by a pilot referred to as "Eshel") shot down a Syrian MiG-21 (sometimes attributed as a shared kill with an F-15).

By the time of the Israeli invasion of southern Lebanon in 1982 (Operation Peace for Galilee) the IAF was able to use both its F-15s and F-16s for air superiority roles, leaving the Kfirs to carry out unescorted strike missions. Though several kills were claimed by the Syrians during the 1982 war, only one can be confirmed as an air to air kill and is attributed to a Syrian MiG-21bis on 9 June 1982. Shortly afterwards, all IAF C.2s began to be upgraded to the C.7 version, with enhanced weight performance, making the Kfir more suitable to its new fighter-bomber role. During the second half of the 1990s, the Kfirs were withdrawn from active duty in the IAF, after almost twenty years of continuous service.

Israel Aerospace Industries announced in August 2013 it would offer pre-owned Kfir fighter jets to foreign customers, with a 40-year guarantee. Unit price was reported to be $20 million. A few Eastern European and Latin American countries expressed interest, Israel's Globes business daily reported. By October 2013, Israel Aerospace Industries was in "very advanced negotiations" with at least two air forces interested in the Kfir Block 60. An aircraft could be delivered within one year, with two squadrons to be sold in two to three years. The Block 60 was offered with the Elta EL/M-2032 with open architecture avionics to allow a customer to install other systems. The sensor provided an all-aspect, look-down/shoot-down performance in air-to-air and air-to-ground missions, with the capability to simultaneously track up to 64 targets. The J79 had been overhauled to zero flight hours, and would need replacement after 1,600 hours.

=== Foreign service ===
Since the J79 turbojet engine is an U.S. design, although manufactured under license in Israel, all export sales of the Kfir are subject to prior approval being granted by the U.S. State Department, a fact that has limited the sale of the Kfir to foreign nations.

As of 2006, the IAI Kfir has been exported to Colombia, Ecuador, and Sri Lanka.

==== Colombia ====
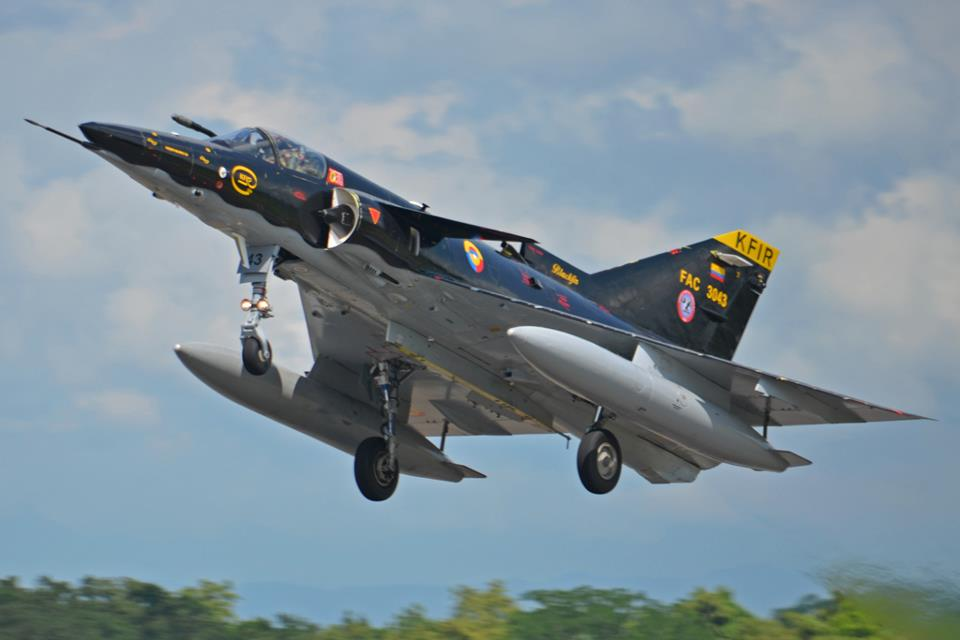
A Colombian Aerospace Force IAI Kfir

As a result of a trade agreement between Colombia and Israel in 1989, the Colombian government bought 12 ex-IAF Kfir C.2s and one TC.2, which were delivered to the Colombian Air Force (FAC) in 1989–1990. Since then, all the C.2s have been upgraded to the C.7 variant. The FAC Kfirs have been widely used in ground-attack missions during counter-insurgency operations against Colombian terrorists. As of 2004 two aircraft had been lost in accidents.

In February 2008, Colombia signed a deal with the Israeli government for an additional 24 ex-IAF Kfir aircraft. It was estimated that these aircraft will most probably be upgraded by Israel Aerospace Industries (IAI) to C.10 standard.

In June 2009, IAI delivered the first batch of upgraded Kfirs to the Colombian Air Force in a ceremony held at IAI's facilities in Israel. In attendance at the ceremony was Juan Hurtado Cano, the Colombian Ambassador to Israel, high-ranking officers from the Colombian Air Force, and executives from the International Defense Cooperation Directorate of the Israeli Ministry of Defense (IMOD-SIBAT). This was a part of a multi-year contract awarded in late 2007 and worth over $150 million to upgrade the existing Colombian Air Force Kfirs, and to supply additional jets. The additional Kfir jets, models C.10-C.12, have been upgraded and improved to include IAI's latest technologies and products.

On July 20, 2009, a Kfir crashed near the city of Cartagena. The Israeli pilots operating the plane were unharmed in the incident, but the jet was destroyed. Israel Aerospace Industries said in a statement that the plane was flying a refresher flight, and that the aircraft didn't come to a stop on the landing strip, landing outside it. The director of the Israel Aerospace Industries announced that an investigation into the incident had already begun and that a panel to probe the crash had been appointed. On July 22, 2009, IAI informed the Colombian Air Force that the accident was caused by an unspecified human error. As a result, IAI will replace the unit lost with another one and it will resume delivery to the Colombian Air Force.

On November 1, 2013, two Colombian Air Force IAI Kfirs intercepted Russian Air Force Tu-160s that had entered Colombian airspace. The Russian aircraft had taken off from Simón Bolívar International Airport Venezuela.

On October 10, 2017, Colombian IAI Kfirs were updated with the EL/M 2052 AESA Radar and incorporated the I-Derby-ER Active Air to Air Missile and the Python-5 Air to Air Infrared Missile

As of 2019, 23 Colombian IAI Kfirs remain in service.

In April 2025, President of Colombia Gustavo Petro announced that the fleet of IAI Kfirs of the Colombian Aerospace Force is to be retired and replaced by new Saab JAS 39 Gripen aircraft. In May 2025, the first IAI Kfir of the Colombian Aerospace Force was retired and installed as a gate guardian at Captain Germán Olano Moreno Air Base.

==== Ecuador ====
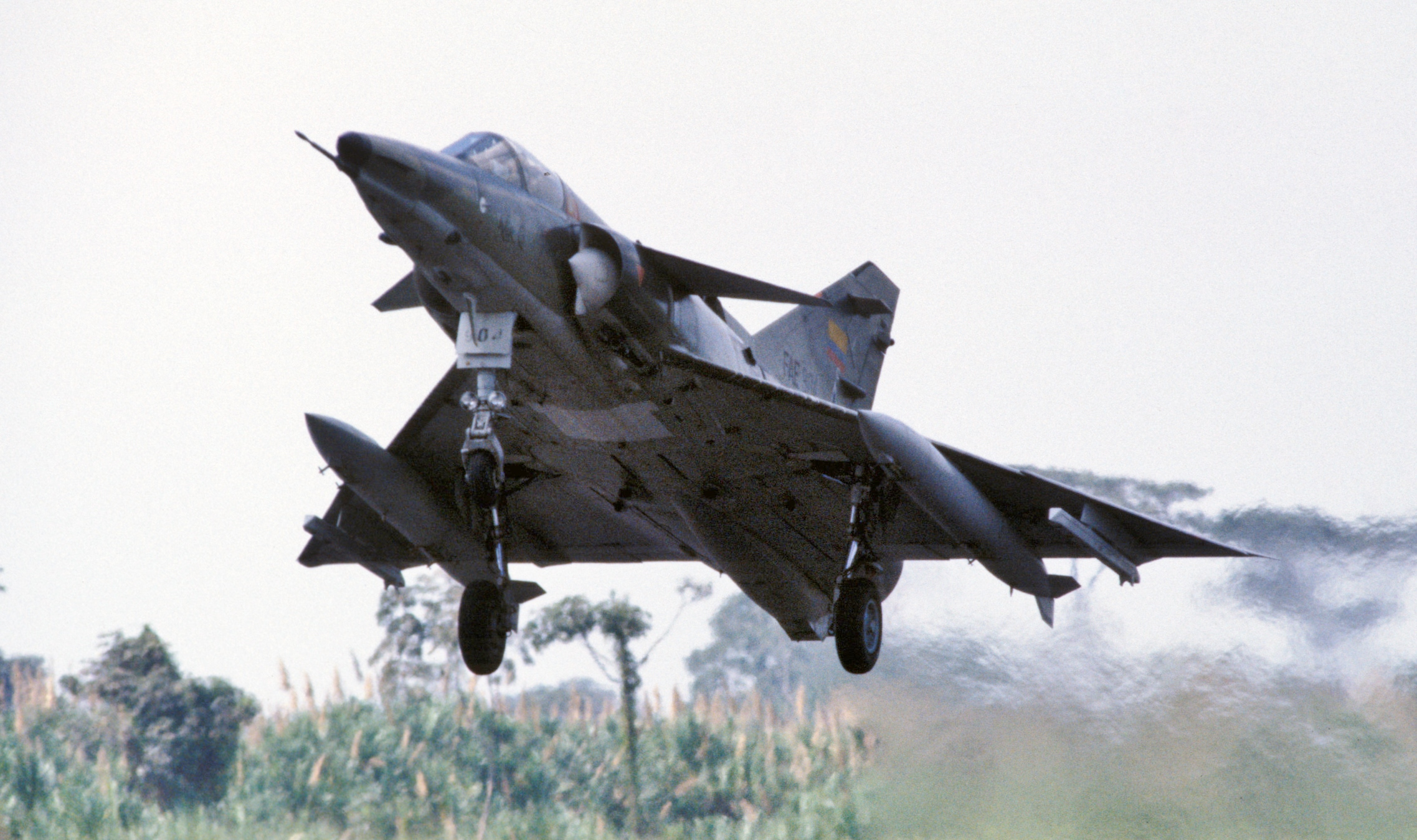
Ecuadorian Air Force IAI Kfir C2

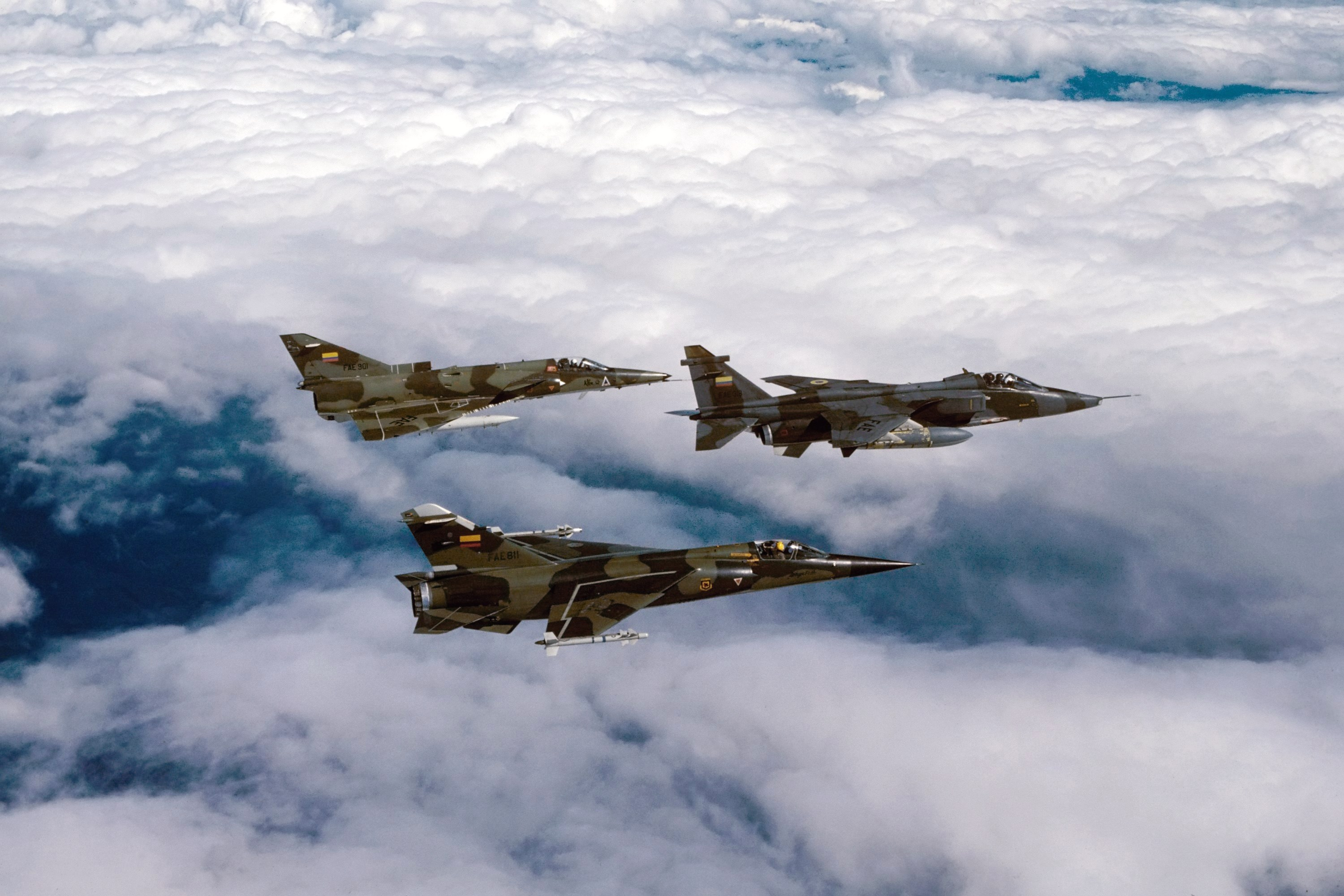
FAE Kfir C.2 flying with a Jaguar and a Mirage F1

In 1981, Ecuador and Israel signed a sales agreement for ten refurbished and new ex-IAF Kfir C.2s and two TC.2s, which were delivered to the Ecuadorian Air Force (FAE) in 1982–1983. The deal was approved by the new Reagan administration after having being twice vetoed by the previous Carter administration early on its tenure, when the sale of 24 jets, in an ultimately botched US$150 million deal, was initially considered. The Kfirs formed the 2113rd Squadron (Lions) of the FAE's 21st Fighter Wing, based at Taura AFB, on the Ecuadorian western lowlands.

The FAE Kfirs went into action during the 1995 Cenepa War between Ecuador and Peru. Relying on its fleet of subsonic A-37Bs for low-level ground-attack missions on Peruvian positions, the Ecuadorian Air Force held back its Mirage F.1s and Kfir C.2s for use as escorts and interceptors. On February 10, 1995, a Kfir C.2 shot down a Peruvian Air Force Cessna A-37B with a Shafrir 2 IR-homing AAM.

In 1996, amid still-high tensions between Ecuador and Peru, and despite reports on efforts to block or delay the deal, the Ecuadorians acquired four additional Kfirs (three C.2 and one TC.2) after securing approval from the U.S. State Department in a US$40 million deal with the Israelis.

In 1998, with its aging squadron of SEPECAT Jaguar fighter-bombers about to be withdrawn from active duty, Ecuador began talks with Israel for the sale of a new batch of eight Kfirs. Fearing an escalation of the arms race in South America, as Peru had recently acquired 18 MiG-29s and 18 Su-25s from Belarus, the United States blocked the deal. As an alternative, Ecuador and Israel signed an agreement in 1999 for the delivery of two Kfir C.10s and for the conversion of an undisclosed number of the FAE's original C.2s to the C.10 version, referred to in Ecuador as Kfir CE, featuring a Helmet Mounted Display System, and armed with Python 3 and Python 4 IR-homing AAMs.

By 2005, Ecuador had lost five Kfirs, including one TC.2, due to accidents since the aircraft entered service in 1982.

==== Sri Lanka ====
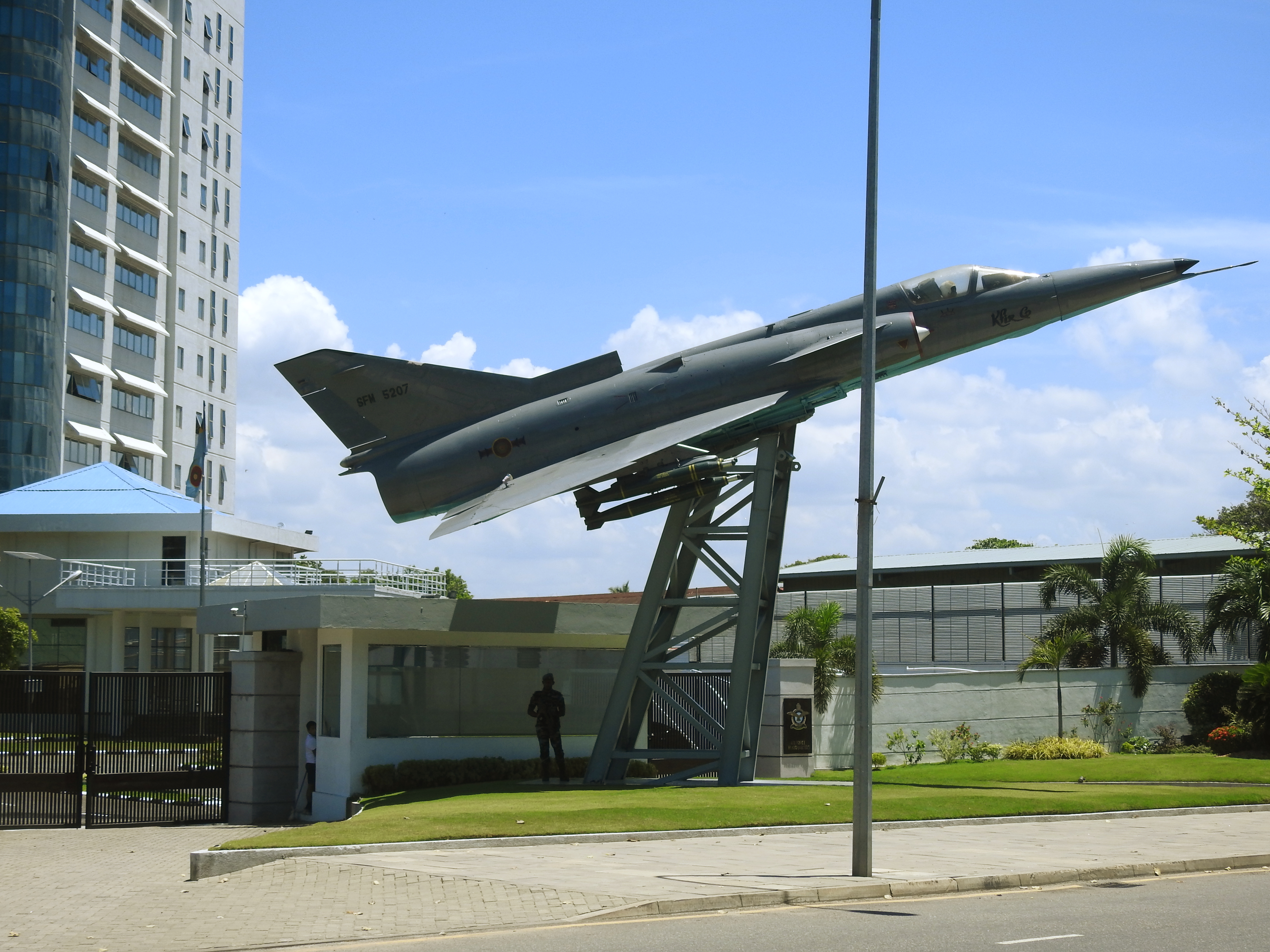
IAI Kfir C.2 at the entrance to Sri Lanka Air Force Headquarters, Colombo

The Sri Lanka Air Force (SLAF) acquired six Kfir C.2s and a single TC.2 in 1995–1996. A further nine aircraft had been added to the inventory by 2005, including four C.2s and four C.7s acquired in 2000. Currently the SLAF operates two TC.2s, two C.7s and six C.2s by the No. 10 "Fighter" Squadron. The SLAF used their Kfirs to carry out attacks against LTTE insurgents during the Sri Lankan Civil War in Sri Lanka. Two Kfir C.7s were destroyed on the ground in an LTTE attack on SLAF Katunayake air base, part of Bandaranaike International Airport, on 24 July 2001. Three others were lost in non-combat related accidents during the Civil War period. None were lost in aerial combat. In March 2011, two Kfirs collided in mid-air during an airshow practice sortie.

On June 30, 2021, it was announced that the IAI will upgrade five Sri Lankan Kfirs for a return to service with new systems and sensors under a US$50 million contract. The first of these upgraded C12s took flight on 11 June 2026.

==== United States ====
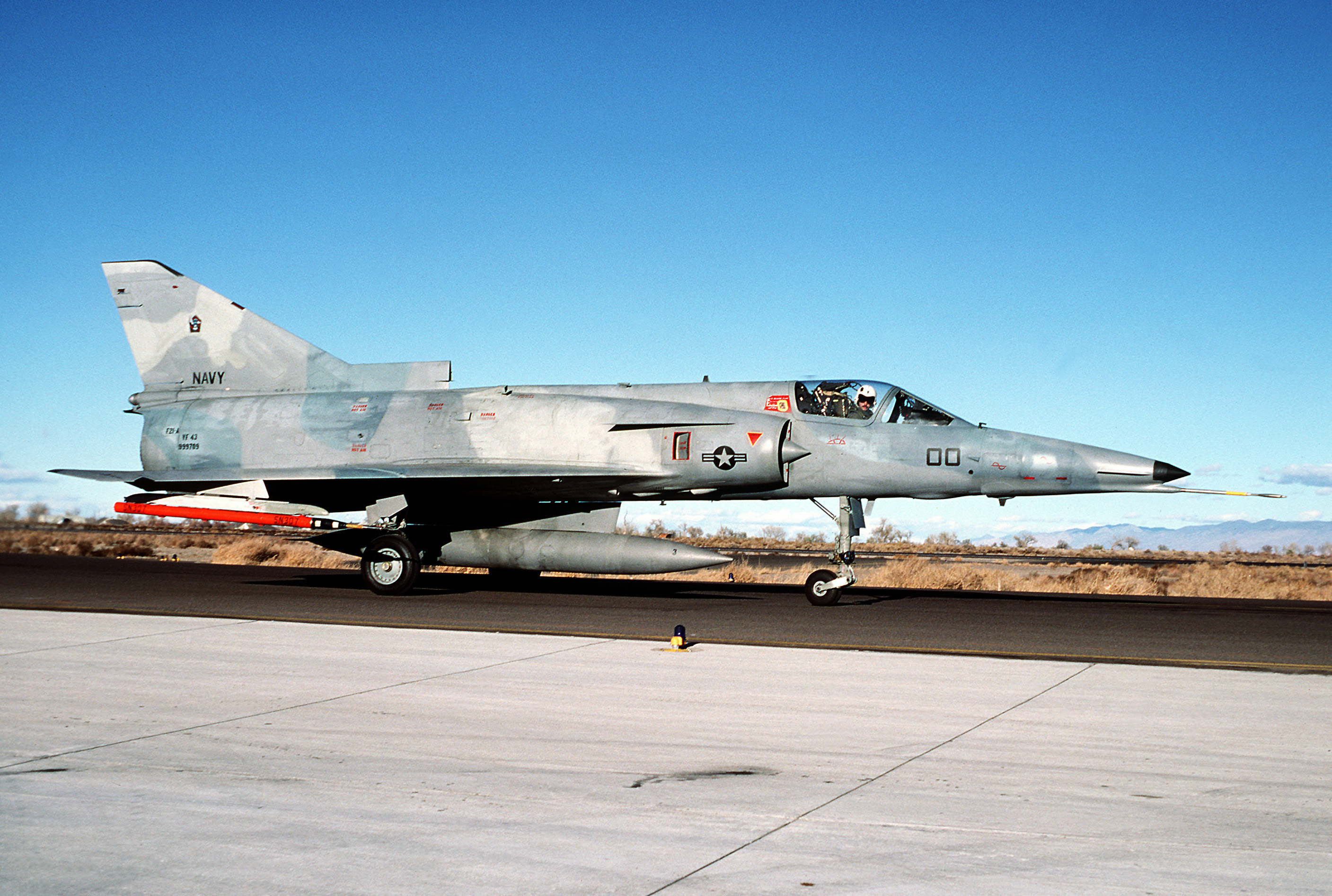
An F-21A Kfir of VF-43 preparing for takeoff at NAS Fallon, Nevada, United States (1986)

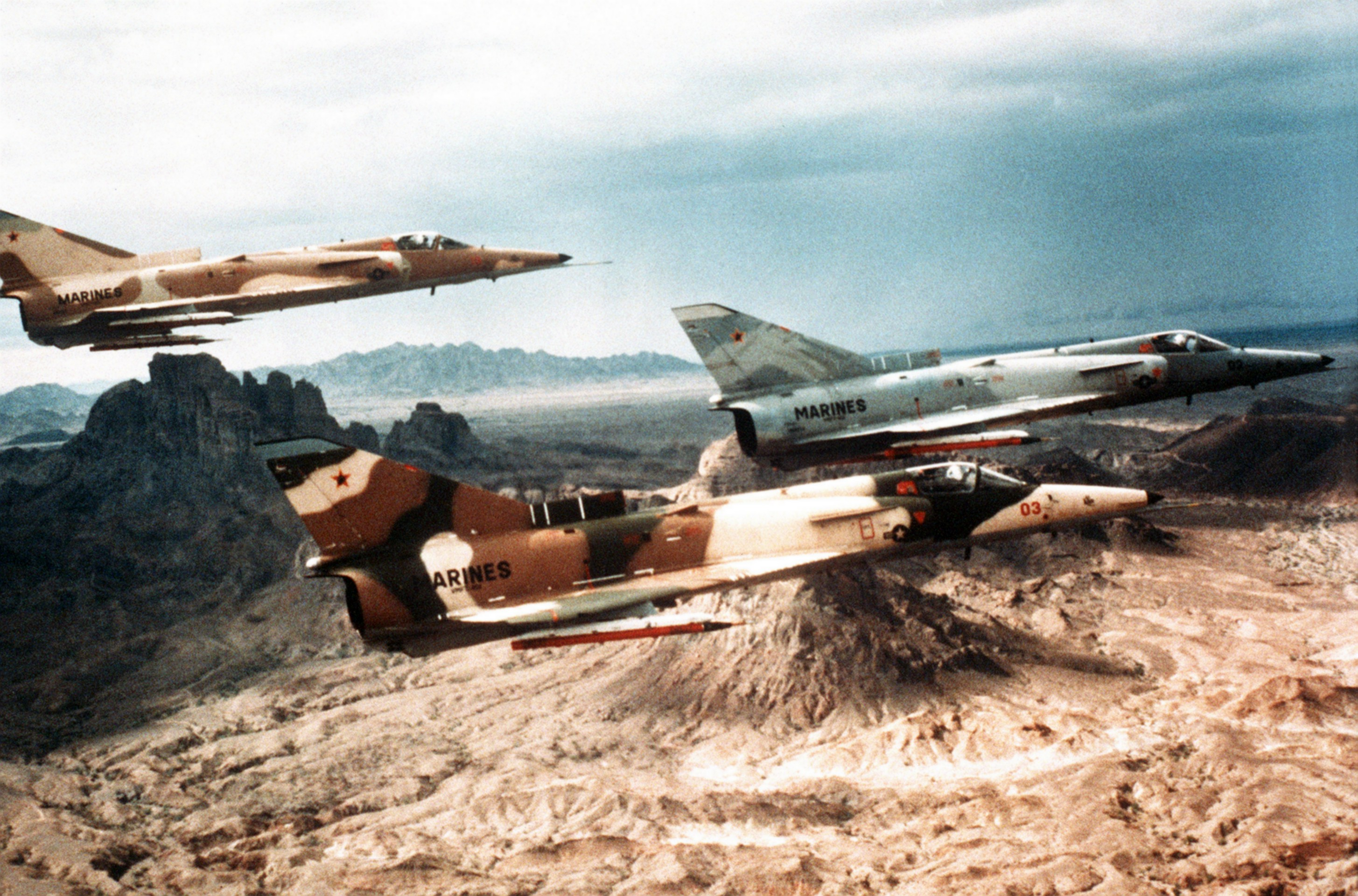
Three F-21A Kfirs from VMFT-401 in 1988

Between 1985 and 1989, the United States Navy and United States Marine Corps leased 25 examples of the Kfir C.1, which were officially designated F-21A and modified for use as unarmed adversaries: mock opponents in dissimilar air combat training (DACT). These aircraft had narrow-span canard foreplanes and two small rectangular strakes, one on either side of the nose, which considerably improved the aircraft's maneuverability and handling at low speeds.

The 12 F-21 aircraft leased to the U.S. Navy, painted in a three-tone blue-gray "ghost" scheme, were operated by Fighter Squadron 43 (VF-43), based at NAS Oceana, Virginia. In 1988, they were returned and replaced by the F-16N. The 13 aircraft leased to the U.S. Marine Corps were operated by Marine Fighter Training Squadron 401 (VMFT-401), a 4th Marine Aircraft Wing/ Marine Corps Reserve squadron at Marine Corps Air Station Yuma, Arizona. In addition to the blue-gray painted aircraft, the USMC also had some F-21s painted in Israeli colors and desert "flogger" schemes (named because they were to represent the schemes often worn by Warsaw Pact MiG-23 "Floggers"). The Kfir was utilized because they both shared the common characteristic of being very fast-accelerating, as well as achieving a top speed of above Mach 2. The MiG-23 was targeted as the "enemy" aircraft because at this time the MiG-23 was being introduced in very large numbers, and was a very capable aircraft compared to earlier Soviet types. These USMC F-21 aircraft were replaced by F-5E aircraft when the F-21s were returned in 1989 (although this left the training units without any aircraft capable of accurately simulating the Mach 2+ and fast-accelerating MiG-23).

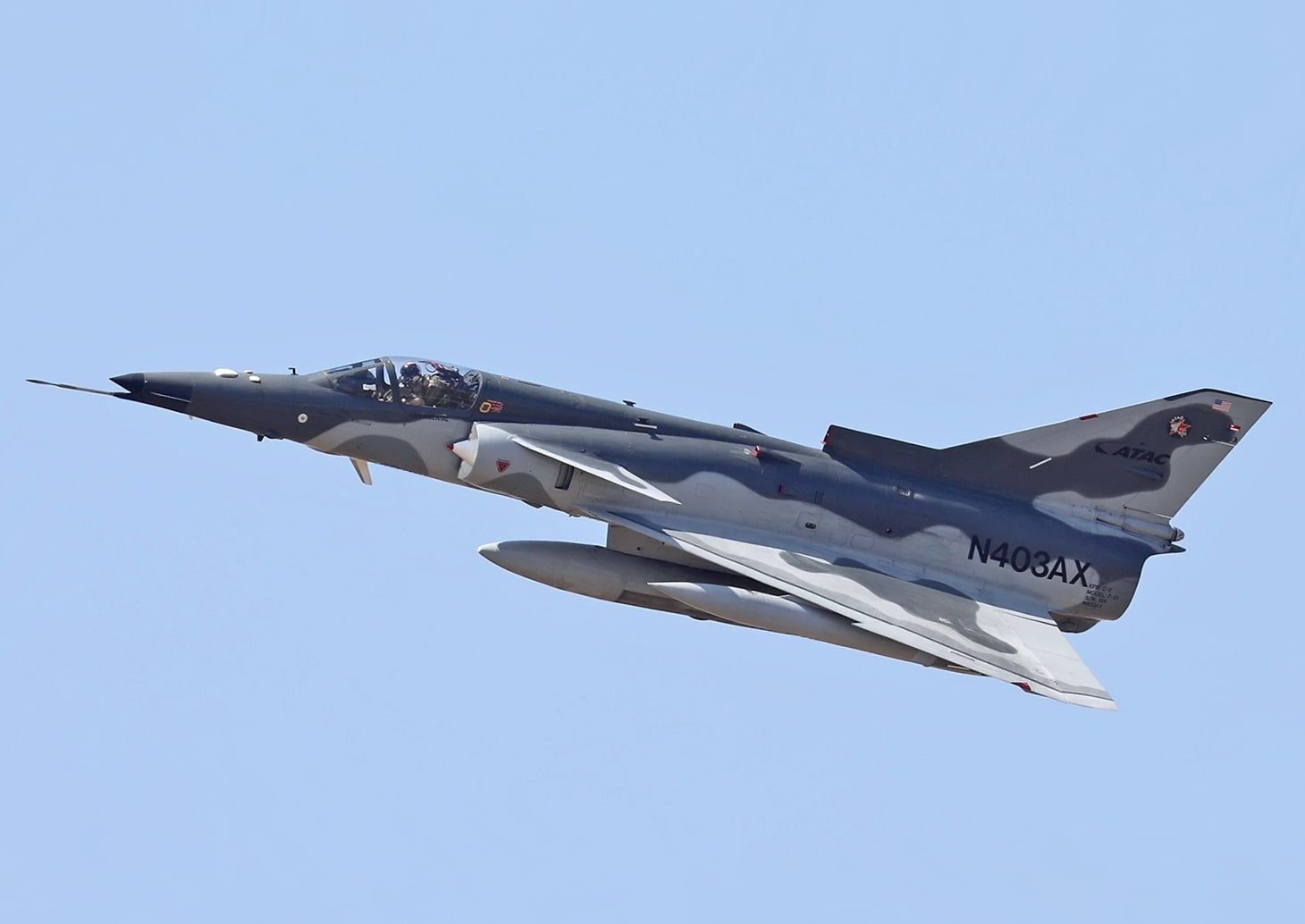
F-21 Kfir operated by the company ATAC

Six Kfirs are also used by the US firm Airborne Tactical Advantage Company (ATAC), a civilian defense contractor that provides tactical adversary aircraft services to the US military. ATAC provides airborne tactical training, threat simulation, and research & development. ATAC's corporate headquarters and primary operating location is at Patrick Henry International Airport in Newport News, VA, with additional permanent operating locations at US Naval Air Stations and Marine Corps Air Stations in California, Nevada, Hawaii and Japan. ATAC also operates Hawker Hunter F.58s. On March 6, 2012, an ATAC Kfir, FAA registration N404AX, crashed while landing at NAS Fallon, Nevada after a flight supporting the Naval Strike and Air Warfare Center. The pilot, a retired USN officer, was fatally injured.

=== Failed Bids ===
==== Taiwan ====
In the early 1990s, IAI was looking to export 40 Kfir-C fighters to the Republic of China (Taiwan) in a deal estimated to have been worth US$400 million to $1 billion; however, the deal ultimately fell through.

==== Argentina ====
During 2013, the Argentine Air Force commenced negotiations with Israel for 18 Kfir Block 60 fighters as an alternative to another deal for 16 ex-Spanish Mirage F1 fighters. During mid-2014, industry sources claim IAI will "soon" receive an order from the Argentine Air Force for Kfir Block 60s after their purchase of surplus Spanish Mirage F1s failed.

But Argentina had been interested in the Kfir for a long time. The first time was at the end of 1970s but the Carter administration vetoed the sale of J79 engines to South American countries. Argentina instead bought Nesher planes from Israel. In 1984, Argentina explored the possibility to locally manufacture the Kfir C7, by Fábrica Militar de Aviones Sociedad del Estado (FMASE). It was periodically negotiated but the deal was never finalized.

== Variants ==
- Kfir C.1: Basic production variant without canards.
  - Kfir C.1P/Kfir Canard: Upgraded version of the Kfir C.1 meant to modify original airframes up to the C.2 standard. These aircraft had been modified and included fences on the air intakes and nose. These fences greatly improved the aircraft maneuverability and slow speed control. These aircraft also included flare/chaff dispensers.
    - F-21A Kfir: 25 upgraded Kfir C.1P aircraft, were leased to the USN and USMC for an aggressor role and were designated F-21A Lion. These aircraft were unarmed and had their internal guns removed.
- Kfir C.2: An improved Kfir that featured many aerodynamic improvements. Changes included "dogtoothed" leading edges on the wings, fences on the nose, and large fixed canards on the air intakes.
- Kfir TC.2: A two-seat training variant developed from the C.2. It has a longer and lowered nose to improve the pilot's view.
- Kfir RC.2: Reconnaissance version of the C.2 commonly known as the Kfir Tzniut due to the Tzniut camera nose being fitted to it.
- Kfir C.7: Vastly modified variant. Most if not all C.2 aircraft were modified to this variant. It included an improved J79-GE-J1E engine that provided an additional 1,000 pounds-force (4.4 kN) of thrust at full afterburner (and as a result increasing the Maximum Take-off Weight by 3,395 pounds (1,540 kg)), 2 more hardpoints under the air intakes, better avionics such as a MFD.
- Kfir TC.7: A two-seat training variant developed from the C.7.
- Kfir C.9: Proposal for Argentina powered by Atar 9K50. Cancelled. Later developed as South Africa's Atlas Cheetah
- Kfir C.10: A variant developed especially for export. The most important change is the adaptation of the Elta EL/M-2032 radar. Other changes include HMD capability and two 127×177mm MFDs. This variant is also known as Kfir CE ( Ecuadorean version ) and Kfir COA (Colombian version).
- Kfir TC.10: Upgraded version of the TC.7 for the Colombian Aerospace Force.
- Kfir C.12: Upgraded version of the C.7 for the Colombian Aerospace Force, a C.10 without the Elta EL/M-2032 radar.
- Kfir Block 60: Upgraded version of the C.10, The main feature of this variant is the use of AESA radar, proposed to the Bulgarian Air Force and Colombian Aerospace Force. As of January 2014 Argentina is reported to be interested in a US$500m deal for eighteen Block 60 to replace its planned acquisition of second-hand Mirage F1M from Spain.
- Kfir NG: Upgraded version, short for Next-Generation. Offered to current and former operators Colombia, Ecuador and Sri Lanka, revealed at Paris Air Show 2019.

== Operators ==
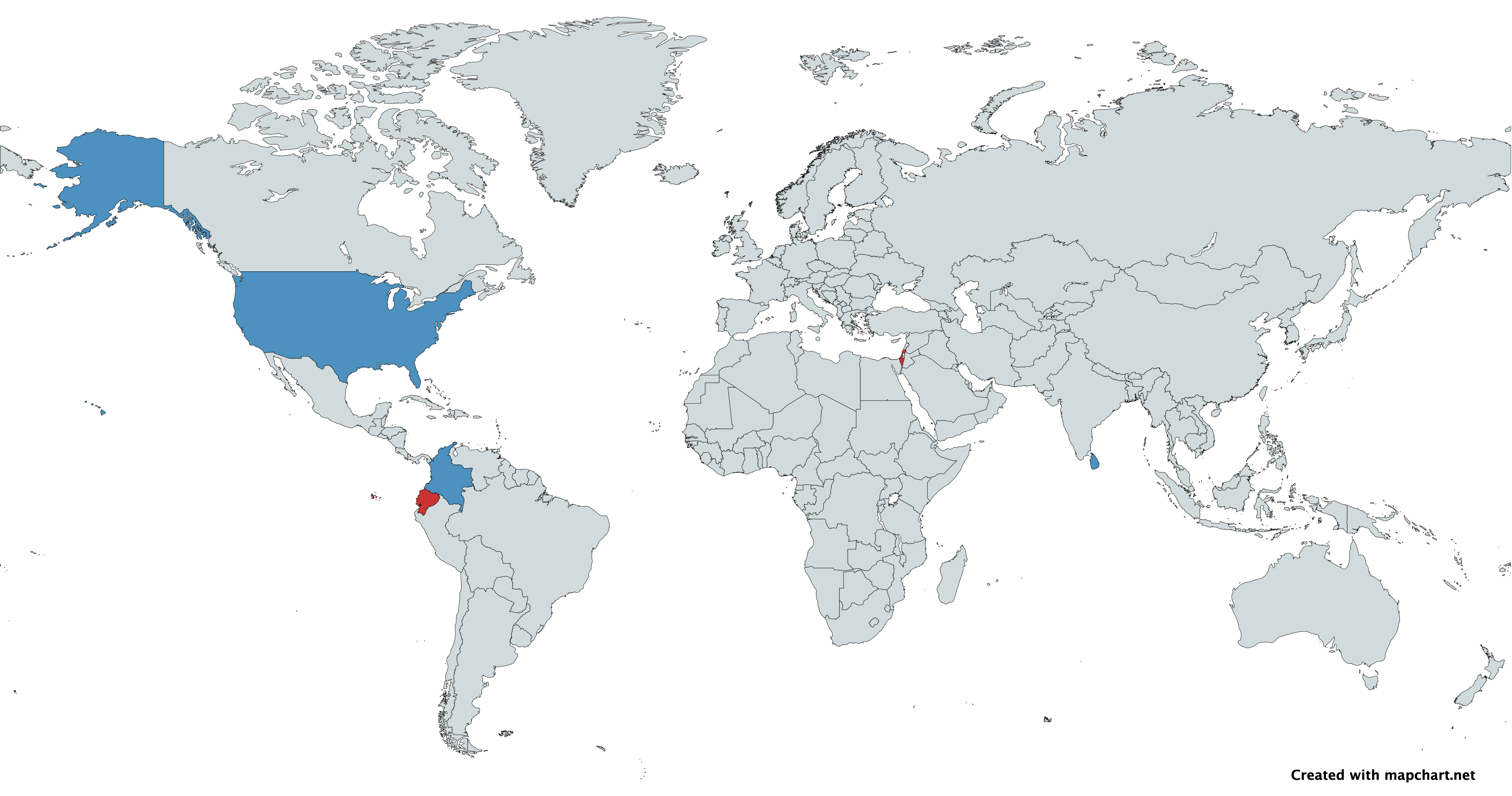
Map with IAI Kfir users in blue

=== Current ===
Colombia

- Colombian Aerospace Force - Phasing out in favour of Saab Jas-39 Gripen fighter aircraft.

Sri Lanka

- Sri Lanka Air Force
  - No. 10 Squadron

United States

- Textron subsidiary Airborne Tactical Advantage Company operates 6 IAI F-21 Kfirs

=== Former ===
Ecuador

- Ecuadorian Air Force

Israel

- Israeli Air Force
  - 101 Squadron
  - 109 Squadron
  - 113 Squadron
  - 144 Squadron
  - 149 Squadron
  - 254 Squadron

United States

- United States Navy
- United States Marine Corps

Under the tri-service designation F-21A Lion, the type was used as an adversary fighter by the Strike Fighter Tactics Instructor program (a.k.a. TOPGUN), run under the auspices of the US Navy. Training of Navy and Marine Corps aviators ceased in 1988 and 1989 respectively.

== Aircraft on display ==
=== Colombia ===
- FAC 3043 - Kfir C.7 displayed as a gate guardian at Captain Germán Olano Moreno Air Base.

=== Israel ===
- 010 - Kfir C.2 displayed as a gate guardian at Ovda Airport.
- 310 - Kfir TC.2 on display at the Israeli Air Force Museum in Hatzerim Airbase.
- 419 - Kfir RC.2 Tzniut on display at the Israeli Air Force Museum in Hatzerim Airbase.
- 451 - Kfir RC.2 Tzniut on display at the Israeli Air Force Museum in Hatzerim Airbase.
- 514 - Kfir C.7 on display at the Israeli Air Force Museum in Hatzerim Airbase.
- 529 - Kfir C.7 on display at the Israeli Air Force Museum in Hatzerim Airbase.
- 664 - Kfir C.2 mounted on a pylon in Beersheba.
- 712 - Kfir C.1 on display at the Israeli Air Force Museum in Hatzerim Airbase.
- 742 - Kfir C.1 on display at Madatech in Haifa.
- 814 - Kfir C.2 on display at Ramat David Airbase.
- 826 - Kfir C.2 on display at the Israeli Air Force Museum in Hatzerim Airbase.
- 853 - Kfir C.2 on display at the Israeli Air Force Museum in Hatzerim Airbase.
- 869 - Kfir C.2 on display at Hatzor Airbase.
- 874 - Kfir C.2 on display at the Israeli Air Force Museum in Hatzerim Airbase.
- 875 - Kfir C.2 preserved in the Givat Olga neighborhood of Hadera.
- 886 - Kfir C.2 on display at the Israeli Air Force Museum in Hatzerim Airbase.
- 895 - Kfir C.2 on display at the Israeli Air Force Museum in Hatzerim Airbase.
- 988 - Kfir TC.2 on display at the Israeli Air Force Museum in Hatzerim Airbase.
- BuNo 999725 - F-21A Kfir on display at the Israeli Air Force Museum in Hatzerim Airbase.
- BuNo 999764 - F-21A Kfir on display at the Israeli Air Force Museum in Hatzerim Airbase.

=== Sri Lanka ===
- CF-712 - Kfir C.2 mounted on a pylon at the Sri Lanka Air Force Museum.
- SFM-721 - Kfir C.7 on display at the Sri Lanka Air Force Museum.
- SFM-5207 - Kfir C.2 displayed outside of SLAF Colombo in Colombo.

=== United States ===
- BuNo 999734 - F-21A Kfir on display at the Intrepid Sea, Air & Space Museum.

== Specifications (Kfir C7) ==
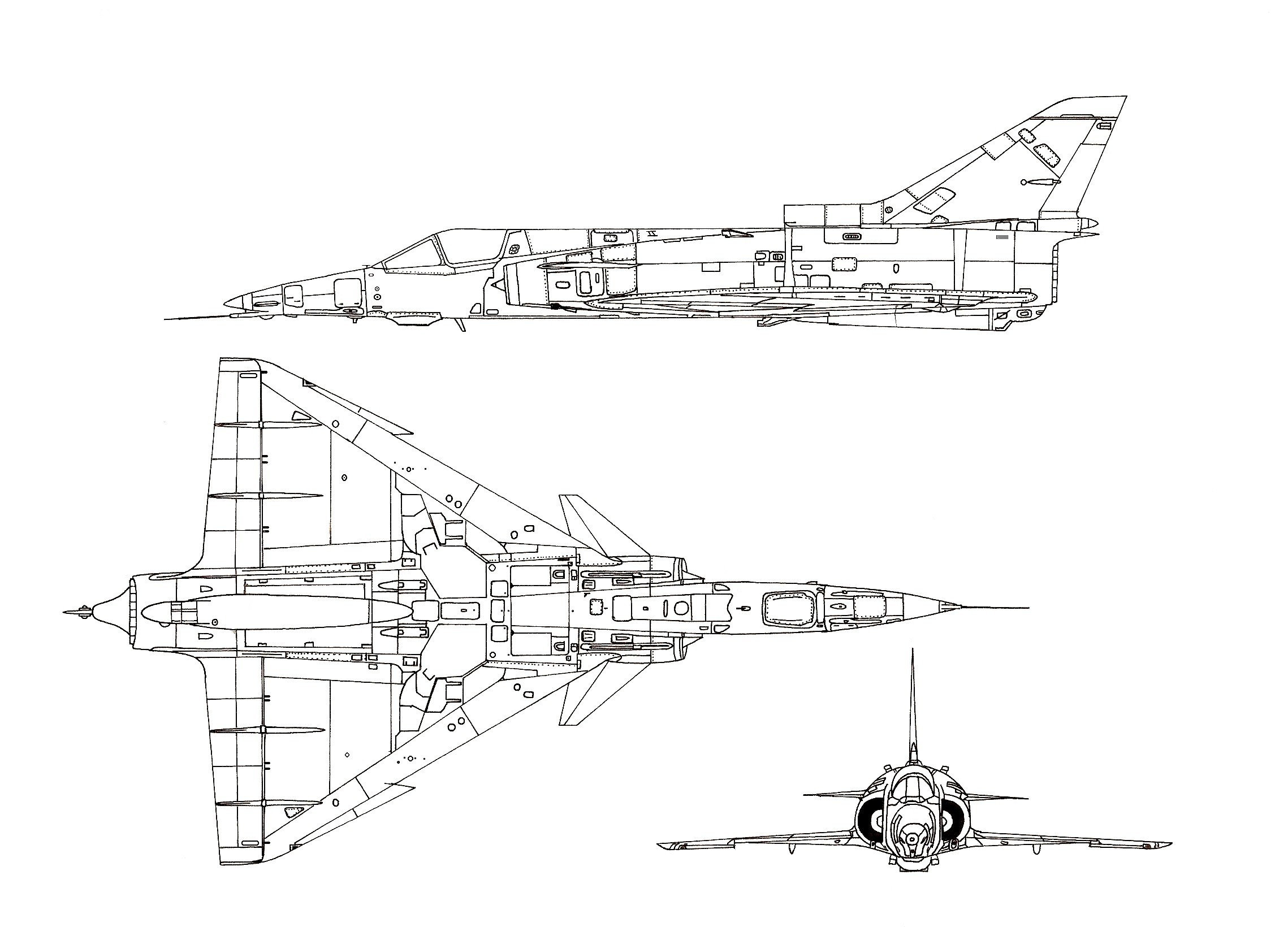
IAI Kfir 3-view drawing

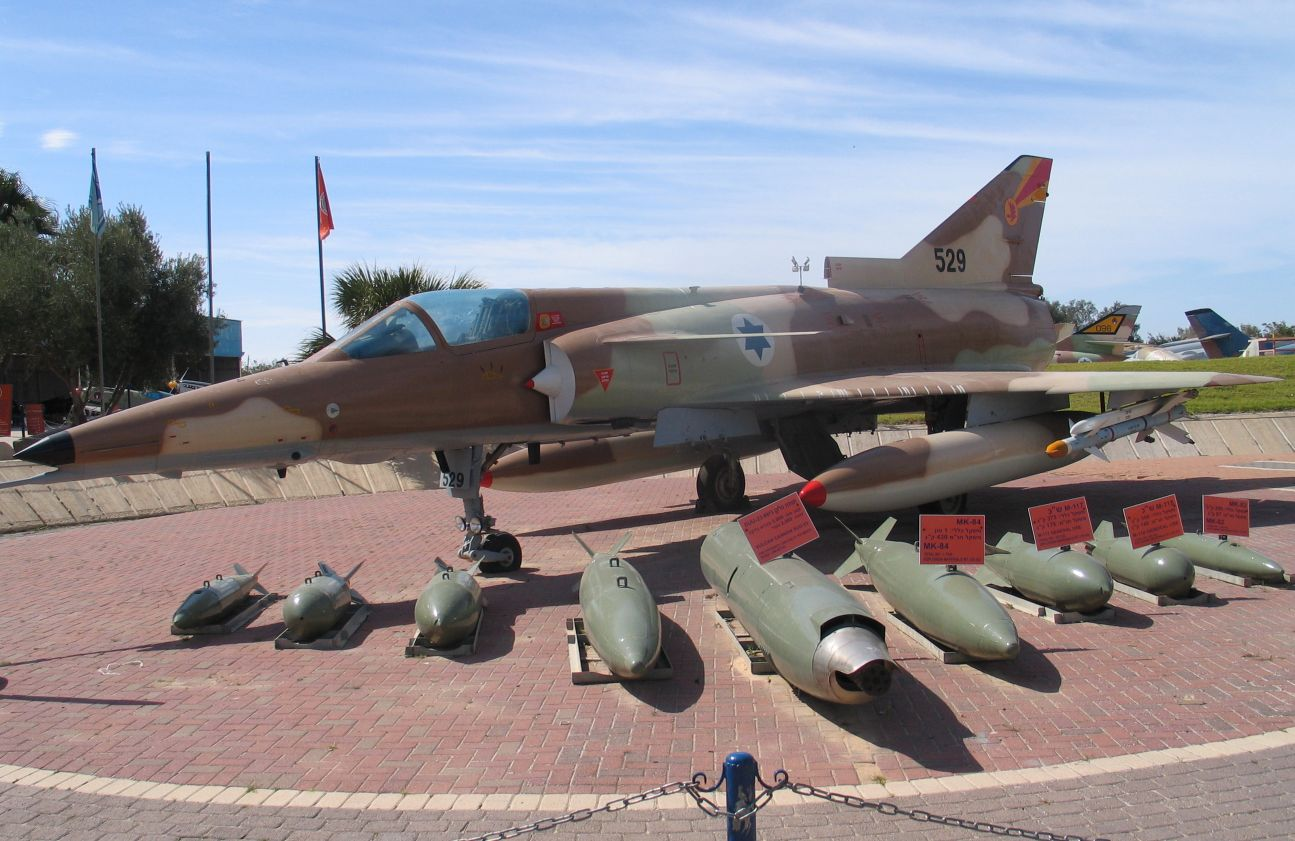
An IAI Kfir with its typical weapon loadout as displayed at the Israeli Air Force Museum, Hatzerim Airbase

Data from From Mirage to Kfir by Amos Dor, pp. 20-36.

General characteristics

- Crew: 1
- Length: 15.65 m (51 ft 4 in)
- Wingspan: 8.22 m (27 ft 0 in)
- Height: 4.55 m (14 ft 11 in)
- Wing area: 34.8 m^{2} (375 sq ft)
- Airfoil: 3.5%
- Empty weight: 7,414 kg (16,345 lb)
- Gross weight: 10,114 kg (22,298 lb) Empty weight+full internal fuel
- Max takeoff weight: 16,500 kg (36,376 lb)
- Powerplant: 1 × IAl Bedek-built General Electric J79-J1E turbojet, 52.9 kN (11,900 lbf) thrust dry, 79.62 kN (17,900 lbf) with afterburner

Performance

- Maximum speed: 2,440 km/h (1,520 mph, 1,320 kn) above 11,000 m (36,000 ft)
- Maximum speed: Mach 2.3
- Combat range: 1,000 or 670 km (620 or 420 mi, 540 or 360 nmi) Depends on if in attack or interceptor configuration
- Service ceiling: 17,680 m (58,010 ft)
- g limits: 7.5g
- Rate of climb: 233 m/s (45,900 ft/min)

Armament

- Guns: 2× Rafael-built 30 mm (1.18 in) DEFA 553 cannon with 140 rpg
- Rockets: FFAR and Zuni unguided air-to-ground rockets
- Missiles: 4× AIM-9 Sidewinders or Python-series AAMs
- Bombs: 9,390 kg (20,701 lb) of payload on nine external hardpoints, including bombs such as the Mark 80 series, Paveway series of LGBs, Griffin LGBs, SMKBs, CBU-100 Rockeyes, BLU-107 Matra Durandal, reconnaissance pods or drop tanks

Avionics

- EL/M-2001B Pulse Doppler radar range finder

== See also ==
Related development

- Atlas Cheetah
- Dassault Mirage III
- Dassault Mirage 5/50
- IAI Nesher

Aircraft of comparable role, configuration, and era

- Mikoyan-Gurevich MiG-23: Contemporary fighter and ground attack aircraft.
- Saab 37 Viggen: A delta-canard multirole aircraft.

Related lists

- List of fighter aircraft

== Bibliography ==
- Niccoli, Riccardo. David's Deltas: Israel's Mirage, Nesher and Kfir Family, Part 3. Air Enthusiast 105, May/June 2003, pp. 68–73. ISSN 0143-5450
- Taylor, John W. R. Jane's All The World's Aircraft 1982–83. London:Jane's Yearbooks, 1982. ISBN 0-7106-0748-2.

=== Further reading ===
- Maquinas de Guerra – Enciclopedia de las Armas del Siglo XX. Planeta-De Agostini, Madrid, 1984. (Aerospace Publishing Ltd., London, 1983). ISBN 84-7551-292-5.
- Terry Gander, Christopher Chant, Bob Munro, Collins/Jane's Combat Aircraft. Harper Resource, 1995. ISBN 0-00-470846-6.
- Federation of American Scientists, www.fas.org .
- Air Combat Information Group, www.acig.org.
- Greg Goebel, www.vectorsite.net.
- Mirage. James Follett. Novel describing the clandestine operation by an Israeli civilian to steal the engineering drawings of the Mirage from a Swiss sub-contractor in the late 1960s. ISBN 0-7493-0003-5
- Breffort, Dominique; Jouineau, Andre (2004). The Mirage III, 5, 50 and derivatives from 1955 to 2000. Planes and Pilots 6. Histoire et Collections, Paris. ISBN 2-913903-92-4.
- Pérez San Emeterio, Carlos (1978). Mirage. Espejismo de la técnica y de la política. Armas 30 (in Spanish). Editorial San Martin, Madrid. ISBN 84-7140-158-4.
