= Hastings Chapel =

Hastings Chapel may refer to:

- Hastings Chapel, Kolkata, West Bengal, India
- Hastings Chapel, in Greyfriars, Coventry, England
- Hastings Chapel, in St Helen's Church, Ashby-de-la-Zouch, Leicestershire, England
