= Swankites =

The Swankites were an offshoot of the Wengerites formed in Ohio in 1861. This occurred over issues of meeting length, church order and method of baptism. They called themselves the Brethren in Christ, a name used by both the Wengerites and the River Brethren at that point.

In 1883 the Swankites united with Evangelical United Mennonites and formed the Mennonite Brethren in Christ.
