= Hastings, Kolkata =

Hastings
- Neighbourhood in Kolkata (Calcutta)
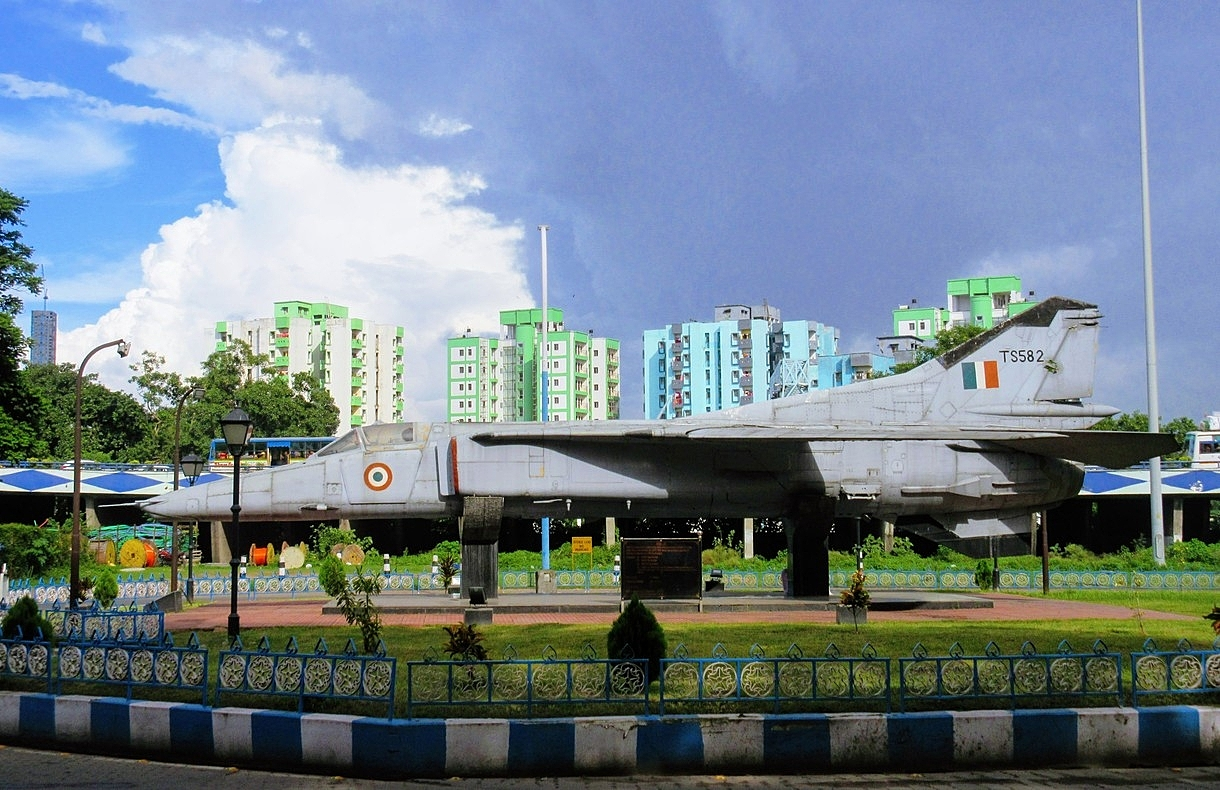
- Mikoyan MiG-27 TS-582 preserved in Hastings

- Location in Kolkata
- Coordinates: 22.546944°N 88.327472°E
- Country: India
- State: West Bengal
- City: Kolkata
- District: Kolkata
- Metro Station: Victoria(under construction)
- Founder: British East India Company
- Named for: Warren Hastings
- Municipal Corporation: Kolkata Municipal Corporation
- KMC wards: 63, 74, 75, 76

Population
  - Total: For population see linked KMC ward page
- Time zone: UTC+5:30 (IST)
- PIN: 700021, 700022, 700023
- Area code: +91 33
- Lok Sabha constituency: Kolkata Dakshin
- Vidhan Sabha constituency: Kolkata Port and Bhabanipur

Hastings is a neighbourhood of Central South Kolkata in Kolkata district in the Indian state of West Bengal.

== History ==
Hastings is an area in Central Kolkata between the Maidan and the Hooghly River. The area named after Warren Hastings, who was the first Governor-General of Bengal then the whole of India from 1772 to 1785.

The Hastings area was initially a Muslim burial ground, then became ‘Coolie Bazar’ for workmen who built Fort William and finally turned into a township for the Ordnance and Commissariat department people.

This was originally the military area of the city and several landmarks remain including Fort William, the Lascar War Memorial and the Ordnance Club, as well as the Race Course. In 1855, a Church Hastings Chapel, Kolkata was built there for the officers of the East India Company.

In 1888, one of the 25 newly organized police section houses was located in Hastings.

This is also where one of the city's major thoroughfares feeds onto Vidyasagar Setu, the impressive suspension bridge crossing the Hooghly River which was completed in 1992.

== Geography ==
=== Police district ===
Hastings police station is part of the South division of Kolkata Police. It is located at 5, Middle Road, Kolkata-700022.

Tollygunge Women's police station has jurisdiction over all the police districts in the South Division, i.e. Park Street, Shakespeare Sarani, Alipore, Hastings, Maidan, Bhowanipore, Kalighat, Tollygunge, Charu Market, New Alipur and Chetla.

== Gallery ==
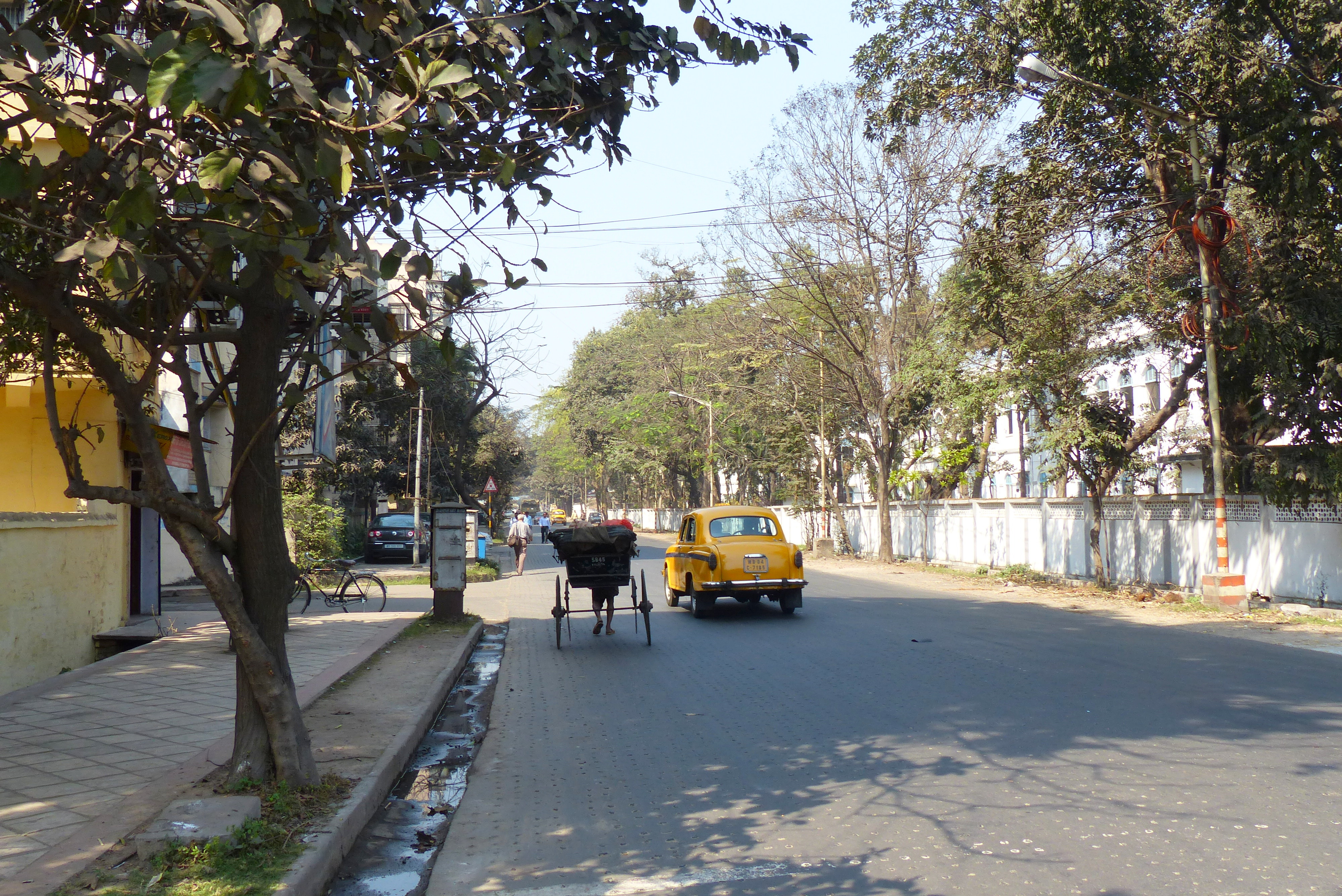
Clyde Road

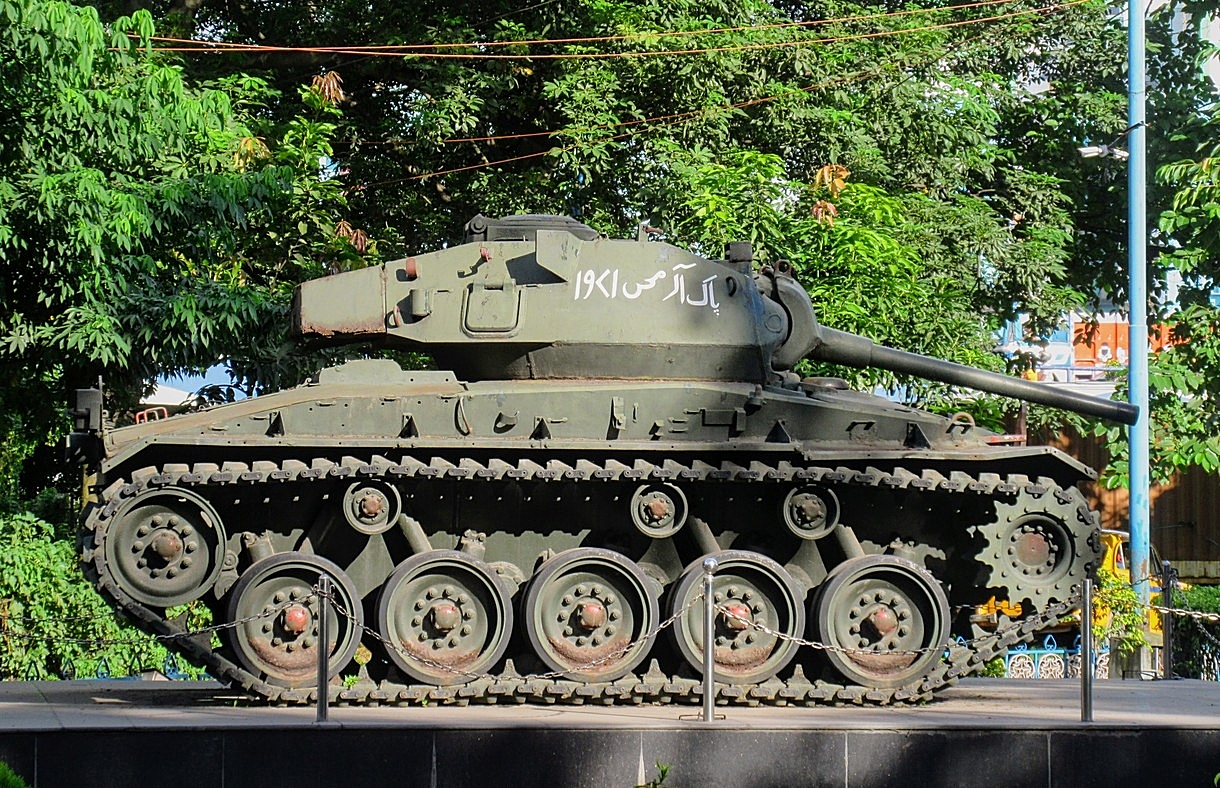
Sainik Park War Tank

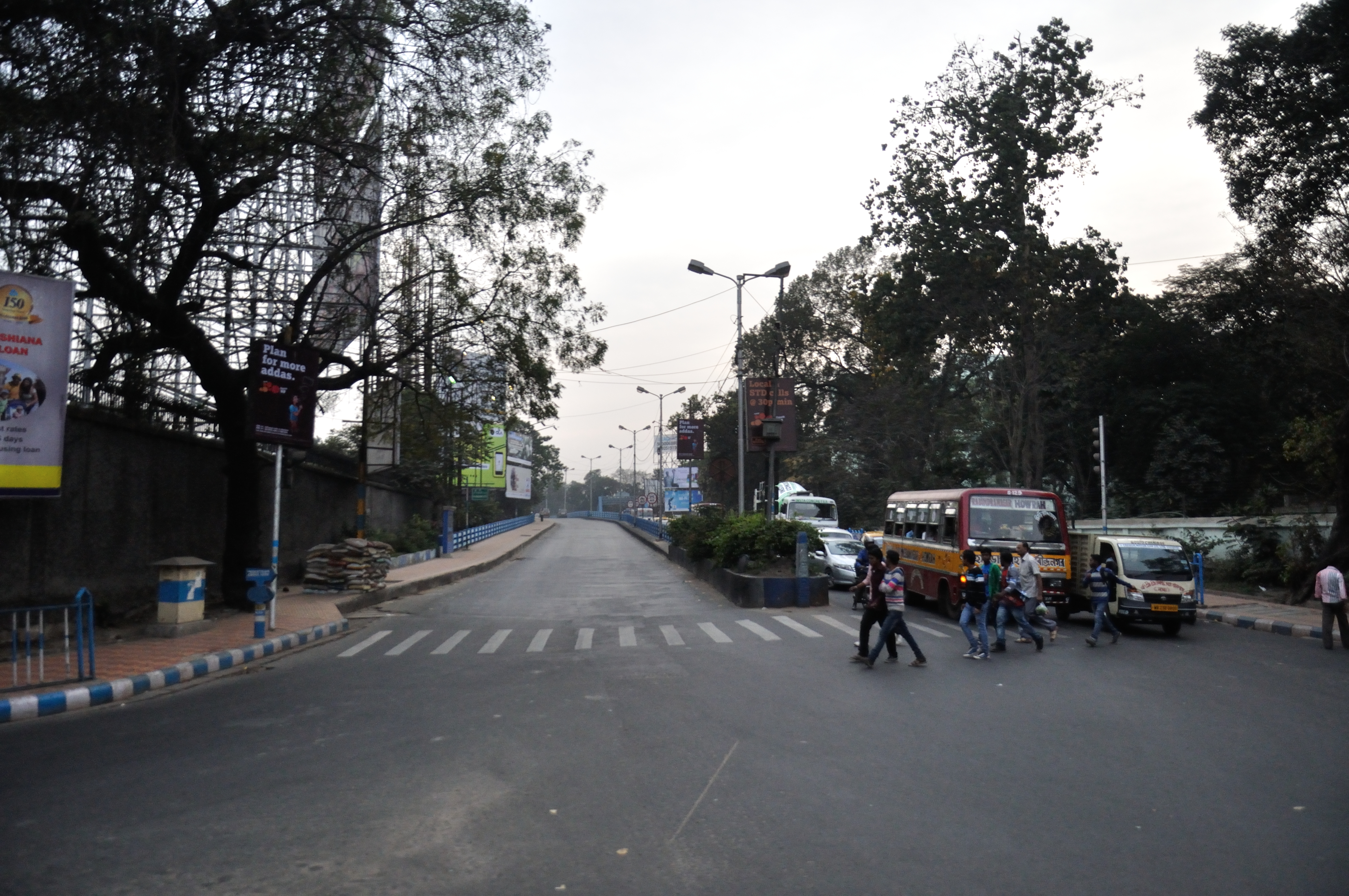
Alipore Road and AJC Bose Road crossing
