= Hastings Chapel, Kolkata =

Church in Kolkata

Coordinates: 22.54794°N 88.32947°E

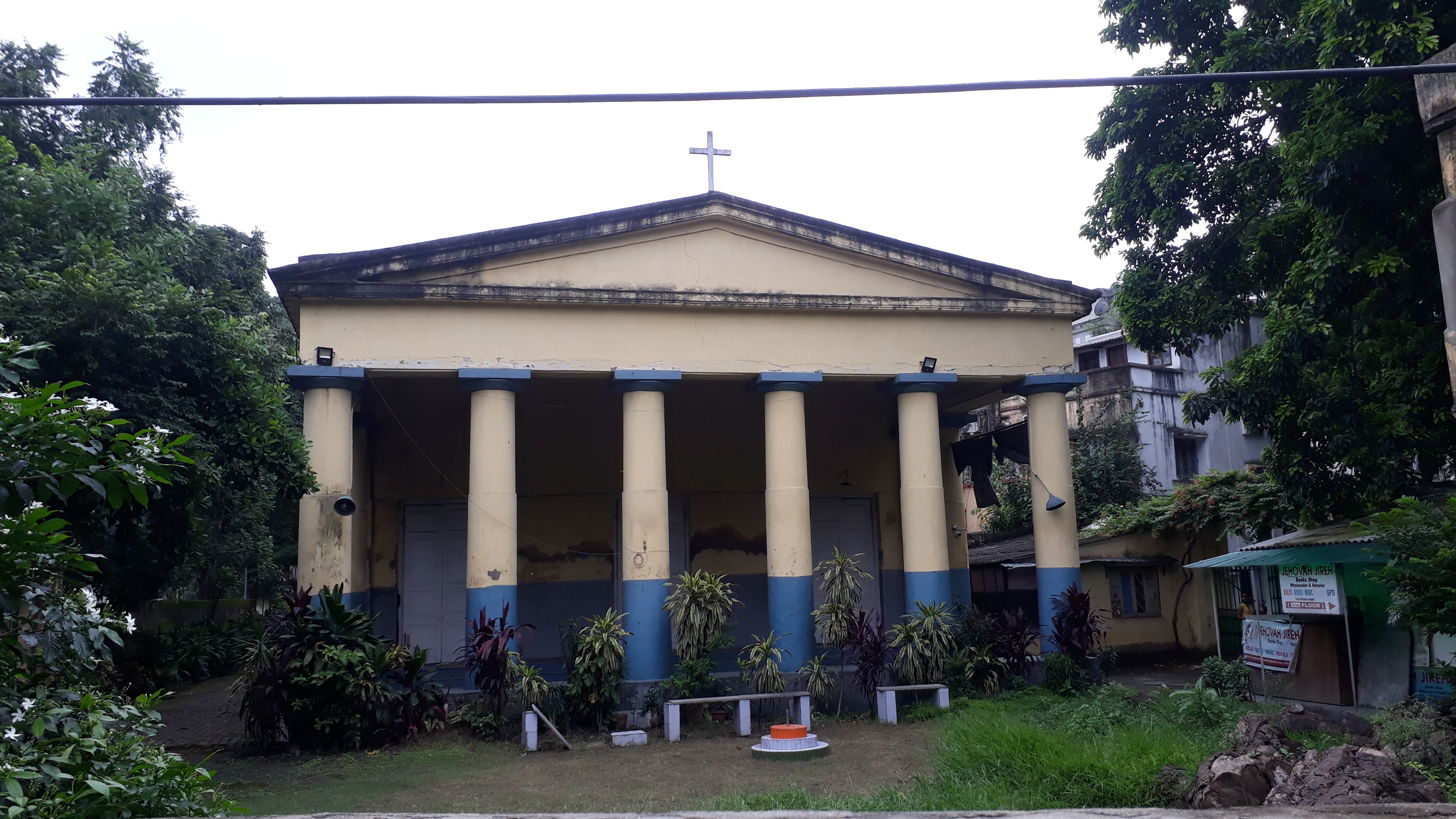
Hastings Chapel in Kolkata

Hastings Chapel, Kolkata is a historic church situated beside Clyde Road at Hastings in Kolkata, in the Indian state of West Bengal.

== History ==
Hastings Chapel, a Christian Missionary Church was founded in 1855 by the London Missionary Society. It has eight Doric columns. There are four marble plaques having the memory of Mary Sophia, Mrs. Mullens, Rev. James Edward Payne and Rev. John Henry Parker, all are died in Kolkata. Presently the church is running under the supervision of United Missionary Church.

== Gallery ==
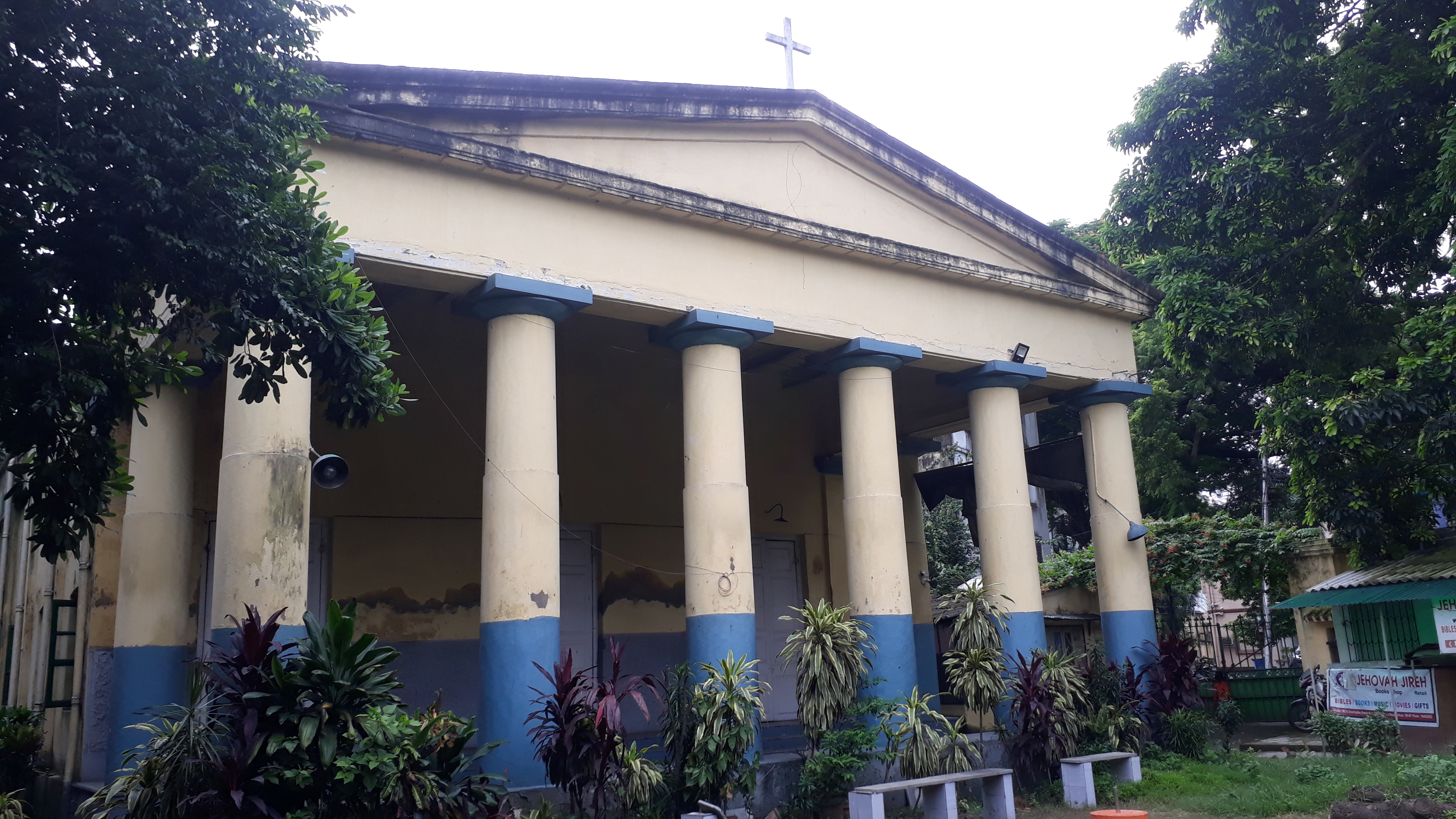

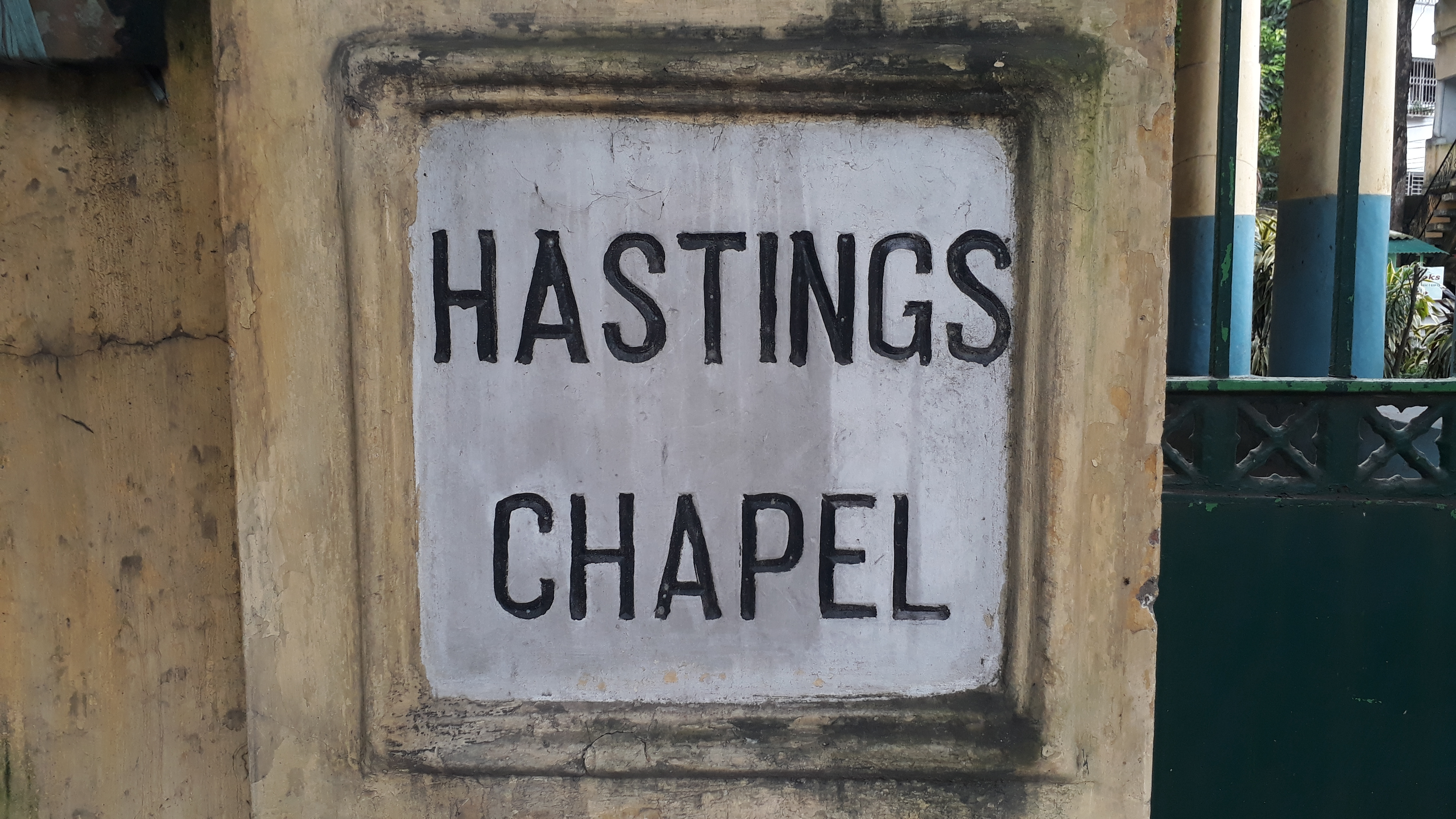

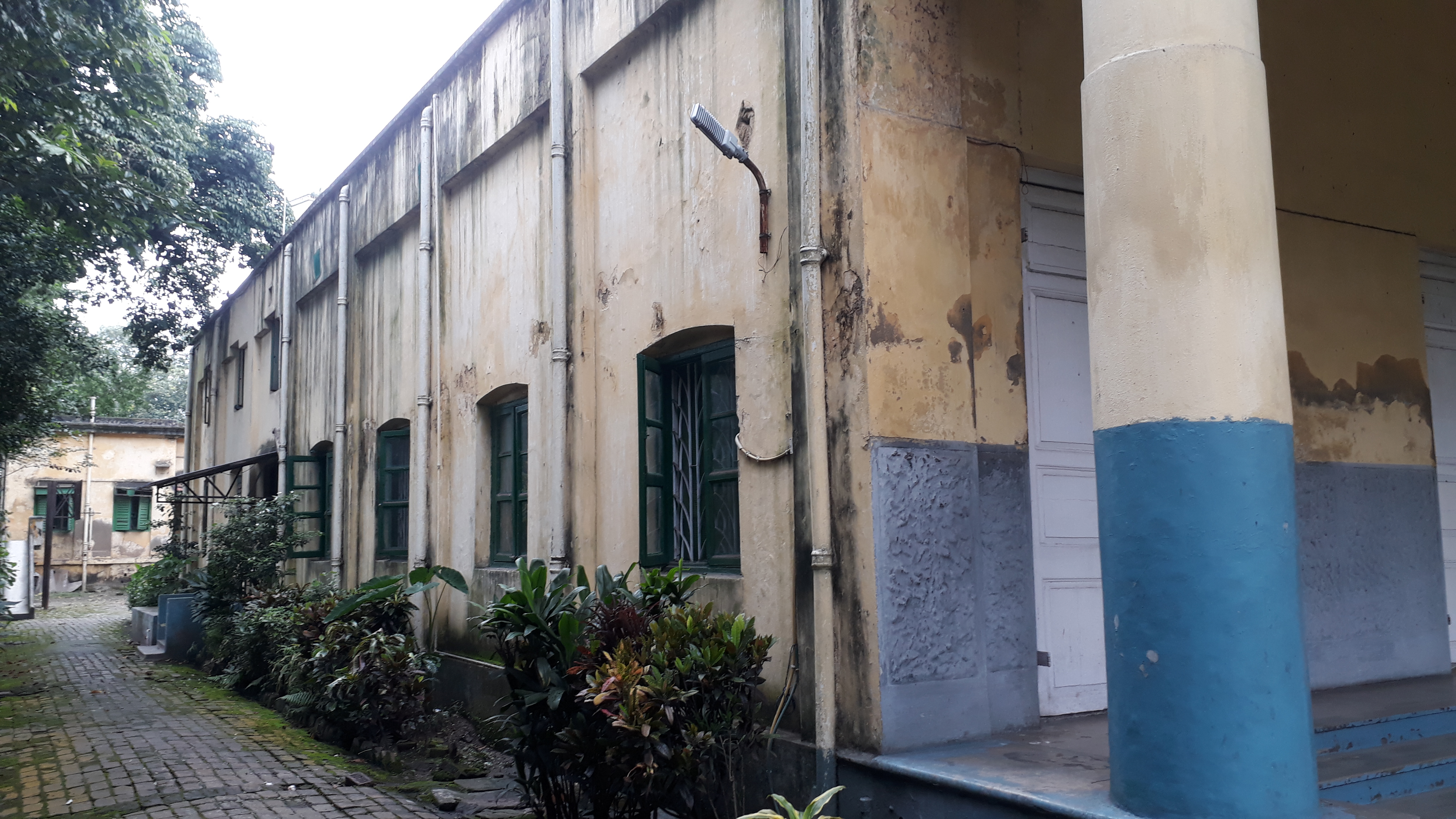

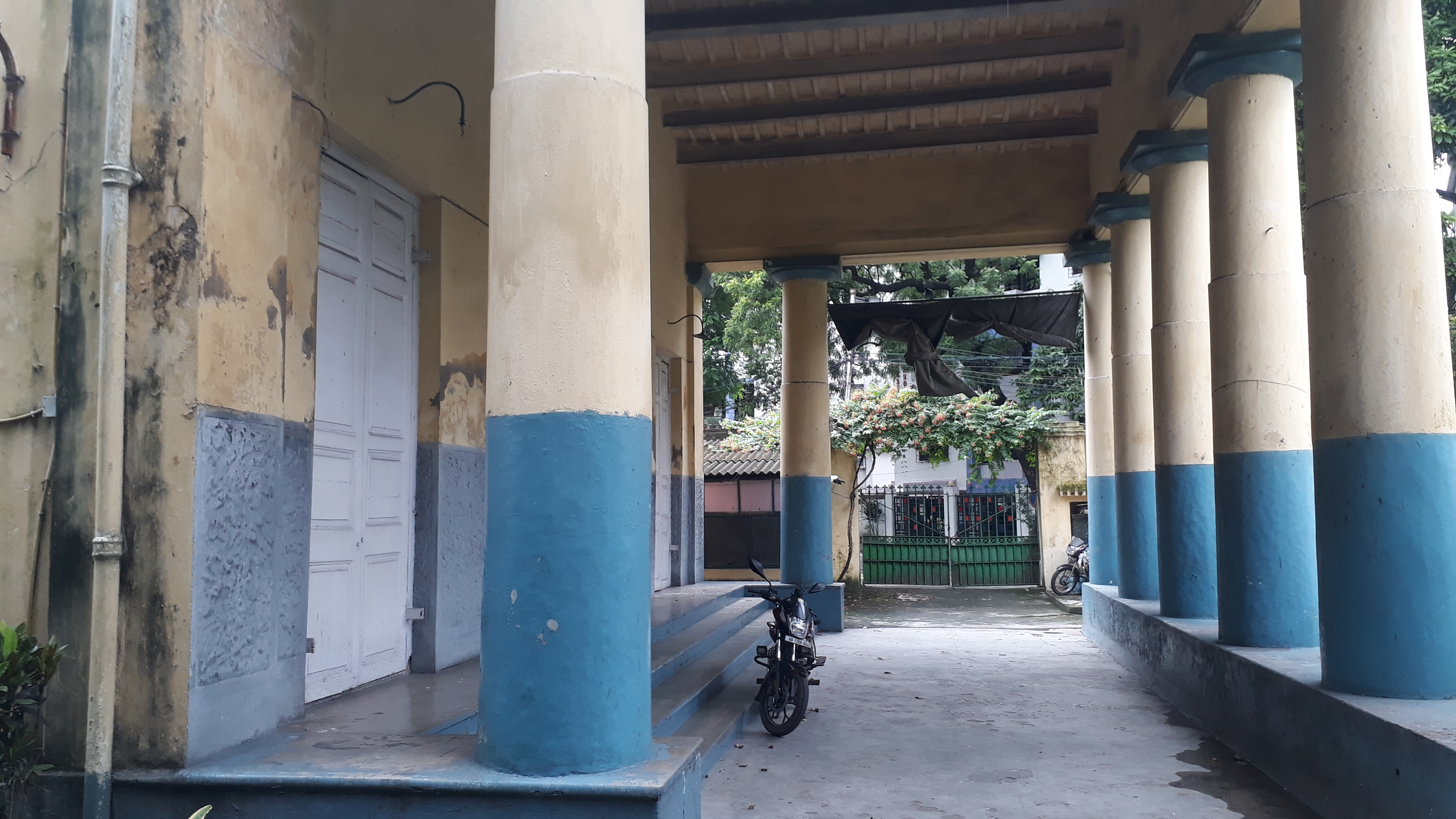
