= No. 12 Squadron SLAF =

No. 12 Squadron
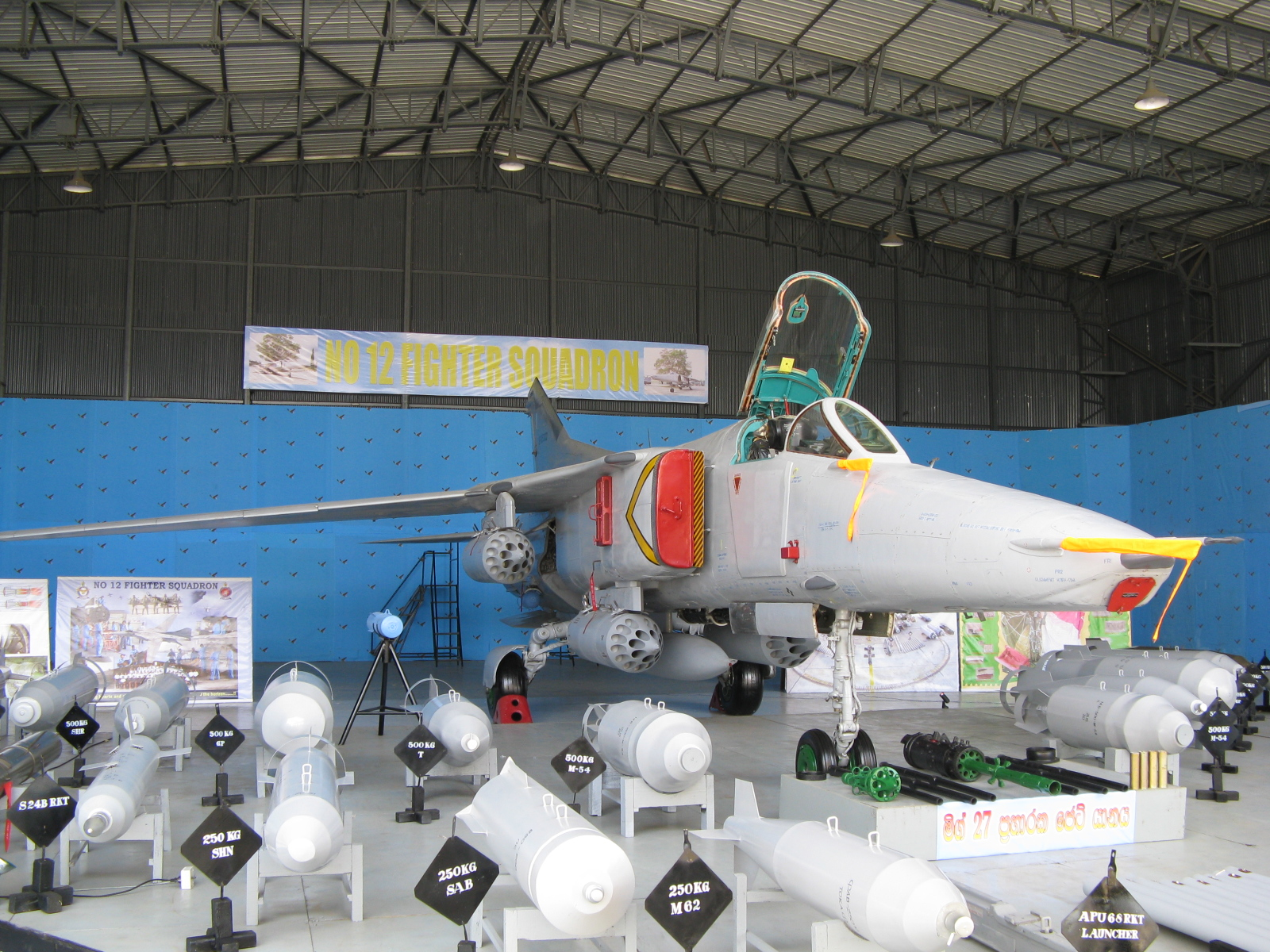
- Sri Lanka Air Force Mikoyan-Gurevich MiG-27M at the Army 60th Anniversary Exhibition.
- Active: 2007 - 2019
- Branch: Sri Lanka Air Force
- Role: Ground Attack, Close Air Support
- Station: SLAF Katunayake
- Equipment: Mikoyan MiG-27
- Engagements: Sri Lankan Civil War

Commanders
- Commanding Officer: Squadron Leader Asela Jayasekara

No. 12 Squadron was a squadron of the Sri Lanka Air Force. It operated in both ground attack and close air support role operating with Mikoyan MiG-27s from SLAF Katunayake. The Squadron also operated a single Mikoyan MiG-23UB as conversion trainer for the MiG-27. In early 2019 SLAF shut down No. 12 Squadron.

== History ==
The squadron was formed in November 2007, when the MiG-27s which had been attached to the No. 5 Squadron were formed into its own squadron.

== Aircraft operated ==
Year of introduction

- Mikoyan MiG-27 - 2007
- Mikoyan MiG-23UB - 2007
