= No. 5 Squadron SLAF =

No. 5 Jet Squadron
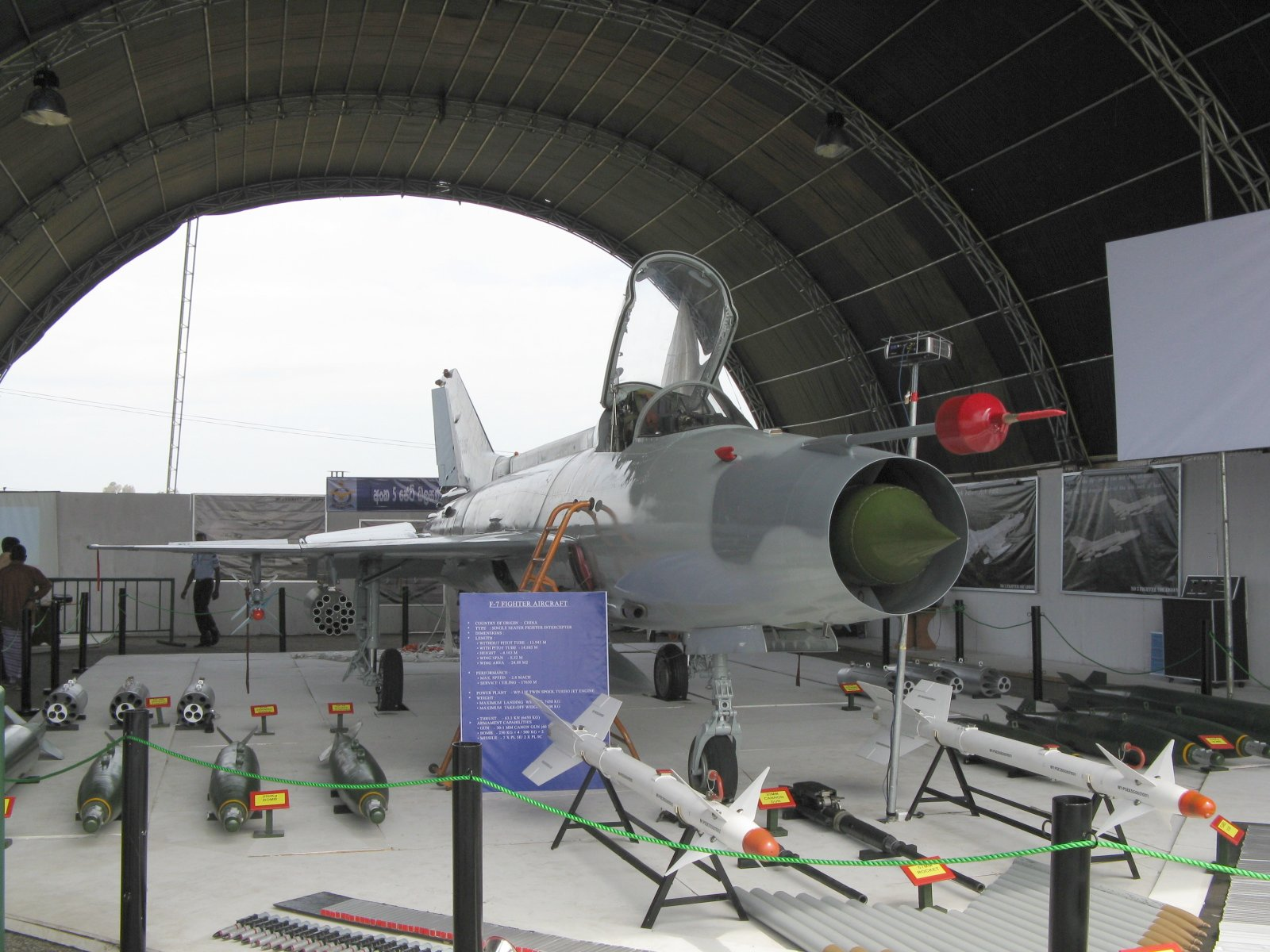
- Active: 1959–1980; 1991 – to present day
- Branch: Sri Lanka Air Force
- Role: Air Defence, Ground Attack
- Station: SLAF Katunayake
- Nickname: Black Drongos
- Equipment: F-7 Skybolt
- Engagements: 1971 Insurrection; Sri Lankan Civil War

Commanders
- Commanding Officer: Wing Commander Malinga Senanayake

No. 5 "Jet" Squadron is a squadron of the Sri Lanka Air Force. It currently operates in both air defence and ground attack role with F-7 Skybolts from SLAF Katunayake.

== History ==
=== Jet Squadron (1959–1980) ===
Established in 1959 when the Royal Ceylon Air Force acquired BAC Jet Provost from the UK to introduce jet aircraft to its fleet, hence it was known as the Jet Squadron. Based at RCyAF China Bay just after its transfer from the RAF in 1956, its primary role was to train pilots for jet fighters that were planned. However no jet fighters were acquired by the RCyAF and the Jet Provosts were put into storage by 1970. The Squadron was reactivated and the Jet Provosts were taken out of storage and in to operational use when the 1971 Insurrection began in 1971. The Squadron moved to the civil Ratmalana Airport for the remainder of the insurgency, receiving six Mikoyan-Gurevich MiG-17F fighter-bombs and a Mikoyan-Gurevich MiG-15UTI trainer from the USSR. By 1980 these aircraft were retired and were not replaced.

=== No. 5 "Jet" Squadron (1991-Present) ===
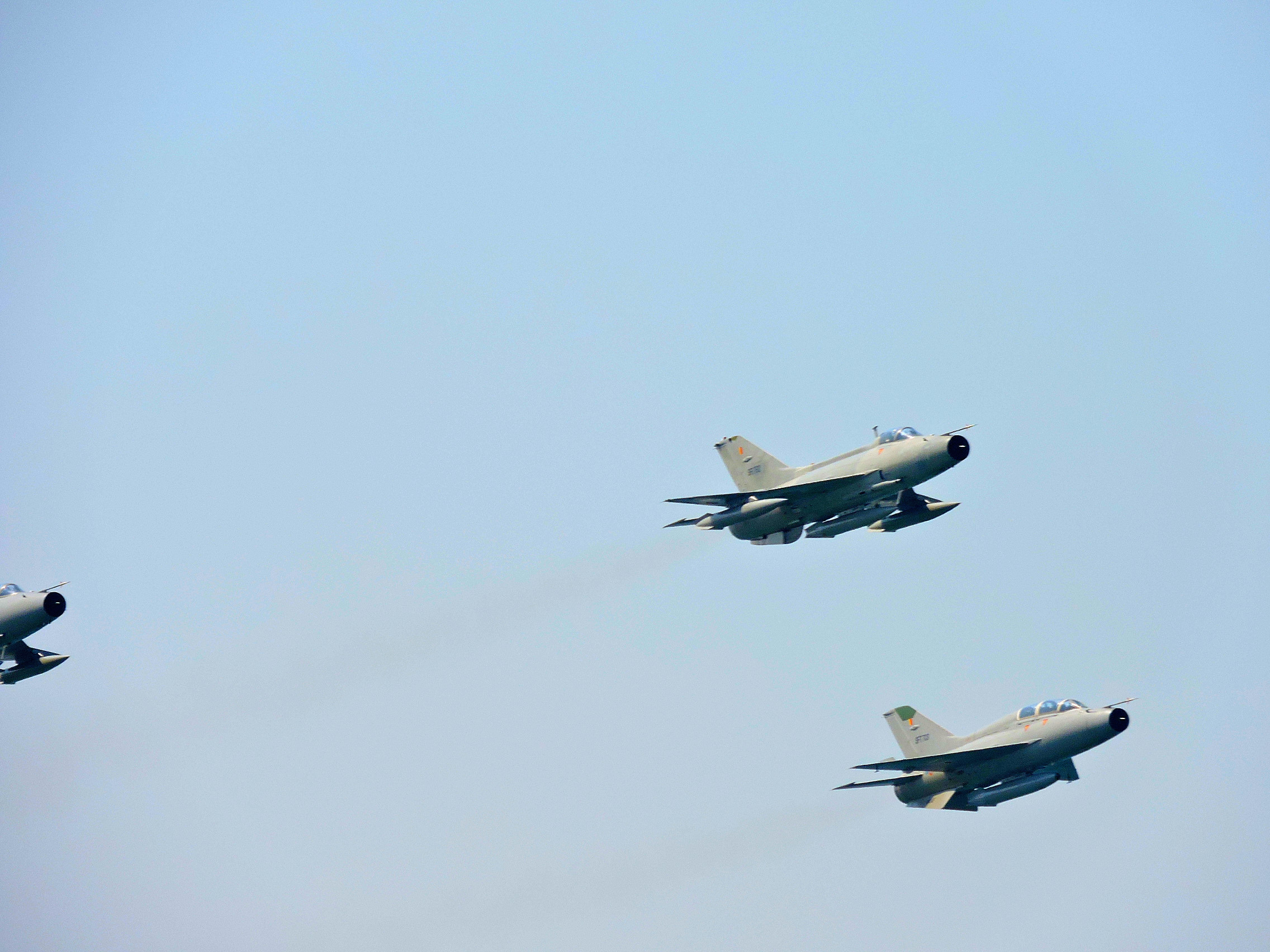
SLAF F-7 fighter jets perform at the 70rth Independence day.

In 1991, the air force decided to reintroduce jet fighters for its needs in the Sri Lankan Civil War and decided to acquired F-7s from People's Republic of China. On 1 February 1991, the No. 5 "Jet" Squadron was formed at SLAF Katunayake under the command of Squadron Leader Harsha Abeywickrama with two FT-5 trainers, which were supplemented with a FT-7 trainer and four F-7 Airguard fighters later that year. These were used for ground attack sorties and in 1994 the squadron moved to SLAF China Bay to be closer to the battlefront. With the No. 10 Squadron SLAF became operational in 1996 the F-7s were used for pilot training and carry out combat training missions. By 2000 they were once again used for ground attack with newer models introduced. Six Mikoyan MiG-27s and one Mikoyan MiG-23UB trainer were introduced to provide close air support, these were later formed into their own squadron; the No. 12 Squadron.

In 2008 six F-7Gs were acquired to be used as interceptors with the squadron taking on the air defence role. October 2008 the SLAF claimed it first air-to-air kill, when it reported that one of the squadron's F-7G interceptors shot down a Zlín Z 43 of the LTTE air wing when it attempted to attack a military base in Vavuniya.

In March 2021, the squadron was presented with the President’s Colours by President Gotabaya Rajapaksa.

== Current role ==
No. 5 Squadron currently operates from SLAF Katunayake and operates the F-7G in air defence role and F-7BS in strike bombing role. It also operates 3 FT-7s as conversion trainers.

== Aircraft operated ==
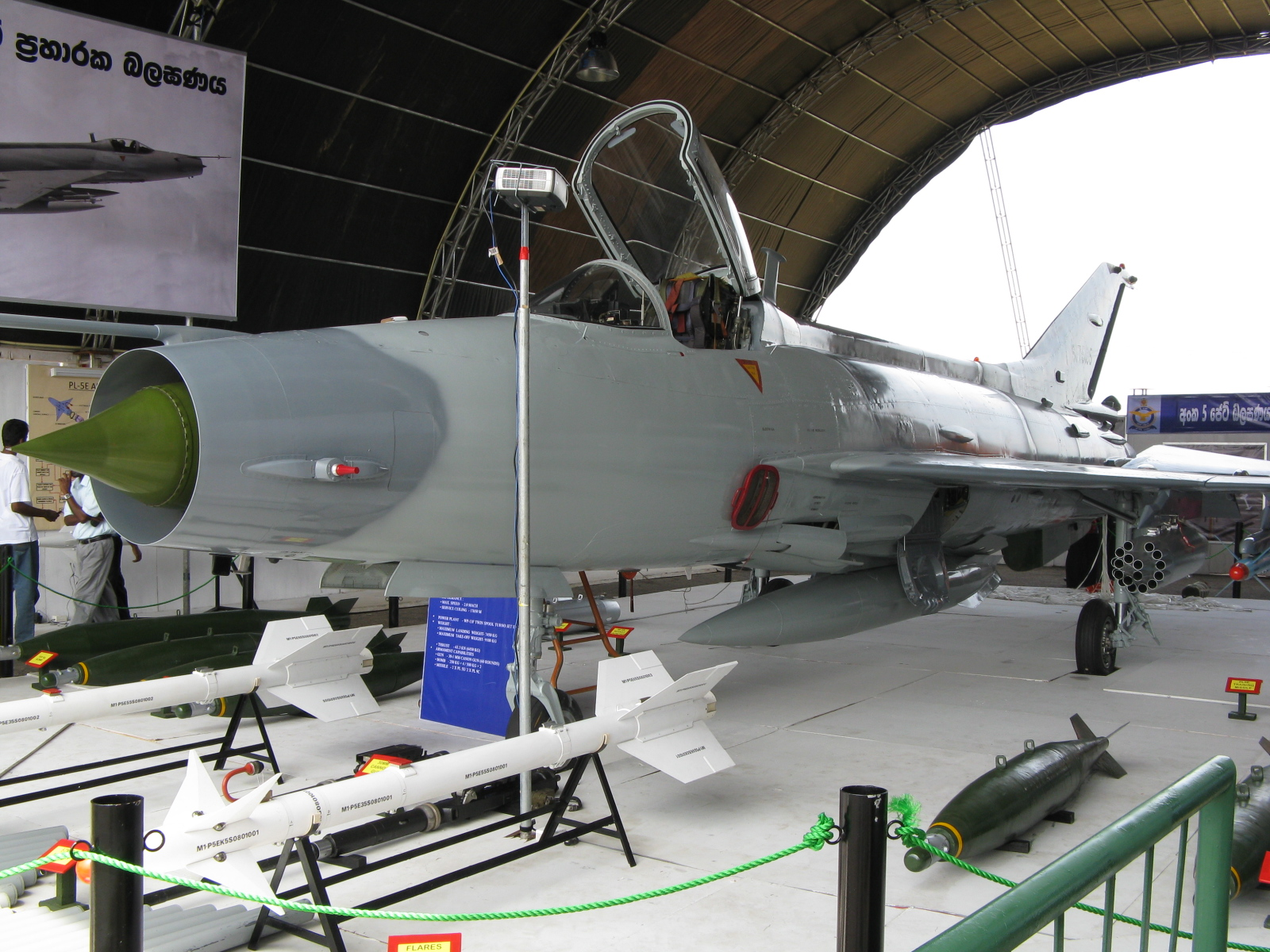
F-7G

Year of introduction

- BAC Jet Provost– 1959
- MIG-15UTI– 1971
- MIG-17F– 1971
- F-5– 1991
- FT-7BS– 1991
- F-7BS– 1991
- MiG-23UB– 2000
- MIG-27– 2000
- F-7GS– 2008
- Karakorum-8-2025

== Notable members ==
- Air Chief Marshal Deshamanya Paddy Mendis, MBIM, IDC, psc, SLAF – former Commander of the Air Force (1971–1976)
- Air Vice-Marshal Harsha Abeywickrama, RWP, RSP, USP, rcds, psc, qfi, SLAF – Chief of Staff of the Sri Lanka Air Force
