= John Wenger =

Founder of the Wengerites

John Weaver Wenger (1778–1851) was the founder of the Pentecostal Church of the Brethren, popularly known as the Wengerites.

Wenger was born in Bethel Township, Dauphin County, Pennsylvania, USA. In 1799, Wenger married Anna Long. They had nine children. She died in 1819. After this he married Sarah Hahn. In 1824, Wenger moved with his wife and children to Montgomery County, Ohio.

Shortly after this he formed a congregation of the River Brethren there along with Samuel Herr. In 1838, Wenger broke with the River Brethren over issues of communion and formed a new church.
