= Wengerites =

19th century religious sect in Ohio

Wengerites were an offshoot of the River Brethren started in Montgomery County, Ohio, and peaking at 15 congregations. They broke from the River Brethren in 1836 over issues of closed communion and meetinghouses. They are named for John Wenger, the leader who initiated the separation. In 1861 part of this group joined the Mennonite Brethren in Christ. The remainder became the Pentecostal Brethren in Christ, which joined the Pilgrim Holiness Church in 1924.
