= Bible Fellowship Church =

Conservative pietistic Christian denomination with Mennonite roots

- Abbreviation: BFC
- Classification: Protestant
- Orientation: Mennonite and Reformed
- Origin: 1858; Lehigh Valley, Pennsylvania
- Separated from: United Missionary Church (1952)
- Congregations: 67 (2023)
- Members: 6,687 (2023)
- Ministers: 146 (2023)
- Official website: www.bfc.org
- Slogan: An Expanding Fellowship of Churches United to Make Disciples of Jesus Christ

Bible Fellowship Church is a conservative pietistic Christian denomination with Mennonite roots centered in the Mid-Atlantic region of the United States. Its denominational leader Donald T. Kirkwood described the denomination as "reformed in theology, Presbyterian in polity, creedal immersionists."

== History ==
=== 19th century ===
Bible Fellowship Church (BFC) was founded as the Evangelische Mennoniten Gemeinschaft (Evangelical Mennonite Society) on September 24, 1858, in Lehigh County, Pennsylvania.

Seven Mennonites influenced by revivalism, elder William Gehman, bishop William N. Shelly, preachers Henry Diehl and David Henning, and deacons David Gehman, Jacob Gottschall, and Joseph Schneider, refused to surrender to the pressure from their bishops to give up their evangelism. They responded by forming the new society, which combined Mennonite doctrine with enthusiastic evangelism.

In November 1879, the Evangelical Mennonites of Pennsylvania consolidated with the United Mennonites to become the Evangelical United Mennonites in November 1879.

In 1883, the Brethren in Christ Church in Ohio merged with the Evangelical United Mennonites to form the Mennonite Brethren in Christ.

=== 20th century ===
In the 20th century, the Pennsylvania Conference of the Mennonite Brethren in Christ grew substantially. Membership doubled between 1900 and 1920 and again between 1920 and 1940. Since 1879, the Pennsylvania Conference held annual camp meetings. The first location was Chestnut Hill outside Coopersburg, Pennsylvania.

In 1910, the denomination purchased land near Allentown, Pennsylvania, called Mitzpah Grove. Located in East Allentown, the camp was located behind present-day Mosser Elementary School between Ellsworth Street at Walnut Street to Ellsworth Street and, inside the camp grounds, to Fairview Street. Between 1942 and 1945, during World War II, the annual camp meetings ceased but resumed again in 1946 following the war's end.

In the 1940s, the relationship of the Mennonite Brethren in Christ Pennsylvania Conference with the other Mennonite Brethren in Christ conferences was strained. Disagreements existed over doctrine and ecclesiology, and these were intensified by personality differences.

In 1947, the General Conference of the Mennonite Brethren in Christ changed the name of the denomination to the United Missionary Church. The Pennsylvania Conference disagreed with the name change, and was allowed to continue under the old name.

Five years later, in 1952, the Pennsylvania Conference officially voted to separate themselves from the other conferences of the United Missionary Church and form their own denomination. The cause of the separation included differences of opinion over church government, the doctrine of holiness, education, foreign missions, and financial autonomy. The Pennsylvania Conference also objected to an expected merger with the Missionary Church Association—which would occur in 1969 creating a new consolidated denomination known as the Missionary Church.

In 1959, the Pennsylvania Conference of the Mennonite Brethren in Christ adopted its present name, 'Bible Fellowship Church, and approved new articles of faith, which included dropping the practice of feet washing. The church government's structure was gradually changed to a more Presbyterian style. Local elders rule individual Bible Fellowship churches, and each of the individual churches sends their elders and pastors to the annual conference.

In the mid-20th century, the denomination's core soteriological viewpoint gradually changed from its early Anabaptist and Arminian perspective to its current Reformed Theology focus.

In 1968, the Bible Fellowship Church sold its Mizpah Grove property in Allentown, and acquired Pinebrook Bible Conference in Stroudsburg, Pennsylvania as the site for its annual camp meeting.

In an address at the 1962 Annual Conference in Hatfield, Pennsylvania, Donald Kirkwood noted that, "historically we were Arminian; gradually but progressively we became Dispensational; presently we are in transition. There are remnants of Arminianism, and Dispensationalism, also an active Calvinism."

=== 21st century ===
In a departure from many other reformed churches, Bible Fellowship Churches continue the Anabaptist practice of believer's baptism. It also holds to Premillennialism.

BFC maintains its headquarters in Whitehall Township, Pennsylvania. Its ministries include the Bible Fellowship Board of Missions, Church Extension Ministries, Fellowship Community, a home for the aged, and Victory Valley Youth Camp. Most of BFC's churches are located in eastern Pennsylvania. There are also churches in Connecticut, Delaware, New Jersey, New Mexico, New York, and Virginia.

As of 2023, there were 6,687 members in 67 congregations with a total church family size of 14,412.

== Pinebrook Ministries ==
=== Pinebrook Junior College ===
In 1950, the Pennsylvania Conference of the Mennonite Brethren in Christ supported the opening of Berean Bible School in Allentown. When the Bible Fellowship Church purchased the Pinebrook Bible Conference in Stroudsburg in 1968, the Allentown campus of the Berean Bible School was sold. The next year, the school reopened as Pinebrook Junior College on the Stroudsburg property. It began granting associate degrees in 1970. In 1976, the college relocated to Coopersburg, Pennsylvania to a property that formerly housed a school and orphanage run by Sisters of the Sacred Heart that had closed in 1974. In 1992, the junior college ceased operations due to declining enrollment causing inadequate finances. In response, the Bible Fellowship Church created the Pinebrook Educational Foundation in 1994 to provide financial aid to Christian students studying at Christian post-secondary institutions. In 2014, the former Coopersburg property was destroyed to make way for a new residential condominium development.

=== Pinebrook Bible Conference ===
Pinebrook Bible Conference is a Christian camp and conference center in the Pocono Mountains in Stroudsburg, Pennsylvania. Founded in 1933 by Percy Crawford, an evangelist who led a radio ministry in Philadelphia, Pinebrook hosted prominent speakers and musicians, including Billy Graham, Jack Wyrtzen, J. Oliver Buswell, William Bell Riley, William Henry Houghton, Robert T. Ketcham, Cliff Barrows, and George Beverly Shea.

In 1968, Pinebrook came under the umbrella of Bible Fellowship Church. On October 17, 2018, Spruce Lake took over stewardship of Pinebrook, while Bible Fellowship Church continues to offer events, retreats, and conferences at the property.
