= Mikoyan MiG-27 =

Series of 1970s Soviet attack aircraft

MiG-27
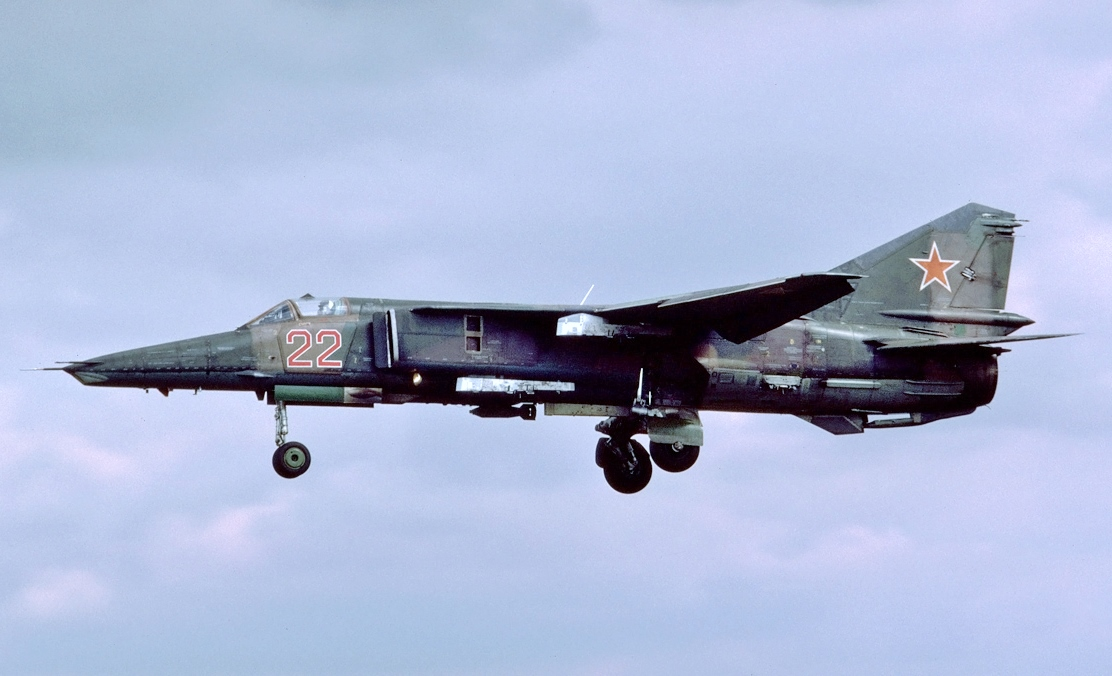
- A MiG-27 of the Soviet Air Force

General information
- Type: Ground-attack aircraft
- National origin: Soviet Union
- Manufacturer: Mikoyan
- Status: Retired
- Primary users: Soviet Air Forces (historical) Russian Air Force (historical); Indian Air Force (historical); Kazakh Air Force (historical)
- Number built: 1,075 (including licensed production)

History
- Manufactured: 1972–1995
- Introduction date: 1975
- First flight: 20 August 1970
- Retired: 1993 (Russia); 2019 (India); 2023 (Kazakhstan)
- Developed from: Mikoyan-Gurevich MiG-23

The Mikoyan MiG-27 (Russian: Микоян МиГ-27; NATO reporting name: Flogger-D/J) is a variable-sweep ground-attack aircraft, originally built by the Mikoyan-Gurevich design bureau in the Soviet Union and later licence-produced in India by Hindustan Aeronautics as the Bahadur ("Valiant"). It is based on the Mikoyan-Gurevich MiG-23 fighter aircraft, but optimised for air-to-ground attack. Unlike the MiG-23, the MiG-27 did not have widespread use outside the Soviet Union, as most countries opted for the Mikoyan-Gurevich MiG-23BN and/or Sukhoi Su-22 instead. in 2023, with the Kazakh Air Force retiring their MiG-27s, the type is no longer in active service.

== Design and development ==
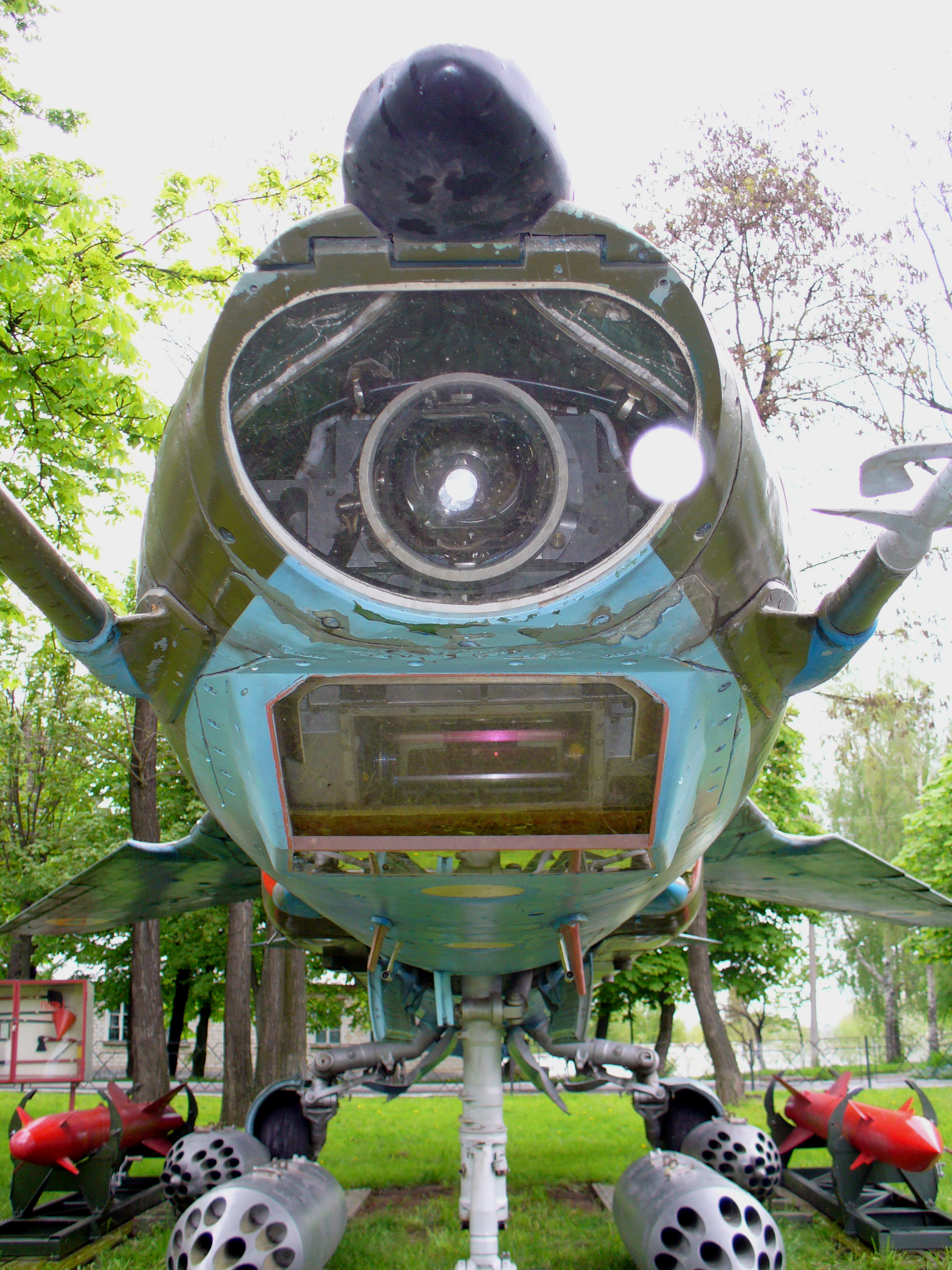
Optical windows of the laser-television sighting system Kayra-23 MiG-27K (kayra [кайра] is Russian for guillemot). Bottom box under the TV channel with a laser rangefinder-laser designator, the top receiver for a laser rangefinder

The MiG-27 shares the basic airframe of the MiG-23, but with a revised nose – nicknamed "Utkonos" ("Platypus") or "Krokodil Gena" in Russian service, first introduced on the MiG-23B. Dissatisfaction with the MiG-23BN led to the further development of the basic airframe to accommodate a stronger undercarriage, simpler intakes and a shorter exhaust nozzle, without radar in favour of a downward-sloping profile for improved pilot visibility, a laser rangefinder and marked-target seeker. Among its test pilots, it was also called "Balkon" ("Balcony") because of the increased frontal view from the cockpit. Additional cockpit armor was installed, along with a totally new nav/attack system.

Since the MiG-27 was intended to fly most of its missions at low altitude, the MiG-23's variable intake ramps and exhaust nozzles were discarded in favor of a simpler fixed configuration, reducing weight and maintenance requirements. The aircraft also has larger, heavy-duty landing gear to facilitate operation from poorer-quality airfields. In accordance with the MiG-27's strike and low-level attack requirements, provisions were made to mount missiles and precision-guided munitions, as well as retaining a nuclear capability in line with other Soviet combat aircraft by introducing specialized navigation systems.

The improved MiG-27M/D versions were introduced during the 1980s, followed by the -K version, which could carry a much larger range of weapons including tactical nuclear bombs.

Aircraft deployed to Afghanistan were upgraded with the installation of BVP-50-60 flare dispensers and the NAZ-7B emergency survival kit, as well as engine modifications for the hot and high conditions.

== Operational history ==
The MiG-27 saw service with the Soviet Air Force in Afghanistan. Although several Western observers considered the MiG-27 widely exported, confusing it with the MiG-23BN, the aircraft type was only exported to India and Sri Lanka which also utilized the MiG-27 in regional conflicts.

=== Soviet Union ===
The MiG-27 entered frontline service with Soviet Air Force Tactical Aviation in 1975, with the 722nd Regiment. It replaced earlier MiG-23B/BN and outdated Sukhoi Su-7 attack aircraft and equipped 22 of the 40 Soviet fighter-bomber regiments, being deployed all over the Soviet Union and other Warsaw Pact countries. Soviet MiG-27s were permanently deployed to five foreign countries: East Germany, Hungary, Poland, Czechoslovakia and Mongolia until the 1990s.

Soviet forces used the MiG-27 during the later stages of the Afghanistan conflict in 1987–89, which was the only time the Soviets used this aircraft in action. During the initial stages of the war, MiG-27s were not deployed to support ground troops in combat, as the Sukhoi Su-17s of the Turkestan and Central Asian military districts together with DRAAF Su-7s were considered sufficient to support the 40th Army's operations against the Afghan Mujahideen. However, in 1988 it was decided to deploy MiG-27s to support the existing forces in theatre. The 134th APIB, formed of three squadrons of MiG-27D/Ms and MiG-23UB trainers, was deployed to Shindand Air Base in October after extensive training in Kazakhstan. The most modern variant, the MiG-27K, was not deployed due to its lack of armour for the pilot. MiG-27s, in common with all other Soviet attack aircraft in the conflict, were limited in effectiveness by the 5,000 metre (16,400 ft) minimum altitude imposed due to the threat from MANPADs. As such they were only able to deploy unguided bombs and rockets against Afghan targets. Missions included bombing of supply convoys, night bombing of troop concentrations, scattering landmines with cluster munitions, and marking or illuminating targets for artillery with SAB-100 flare bombs. The 134th regiment remained in Afghanistan until the Soviet withdrawal, taking part in the siege of Kandahar. They were withdrawn on 4 February 1989, flying to Kalay-Mor airbase in the Turkmen SSR where they waited in reserve until March of that year, when they returned to their home base in Kazakhstan.

Around the same time, MiG-27s started to be gradually replaced by more advanced Sukhoi Su-24 and Su-25 aircraft in the ground attack role at home. Other MiG-27 units, such as the 642nd GvAIP, re-equipped with MiG-29 fighters. Additionally, between 1990 and 1994 a single regiment of MiG-27s (88th Separate Fighter Bomber Regiment) served with Soviet Naval Aviation as a way to save the unit from being dissolved under the Treaty on Conventional Armed Forces in Europe. During the collapse of the Soviet Union, a number of MiG-27s remained in active service, which were then split amongst the air forces of the various former Soviet republics.

=== Russia ===
The Air Force of the Russian Federation inherited most of the Soviet MiG-27s. However, on 1 July 1993 the Air Force decreed that single-engined attack aircraft such as the MiG-27 were to be phased out.

=== India ===
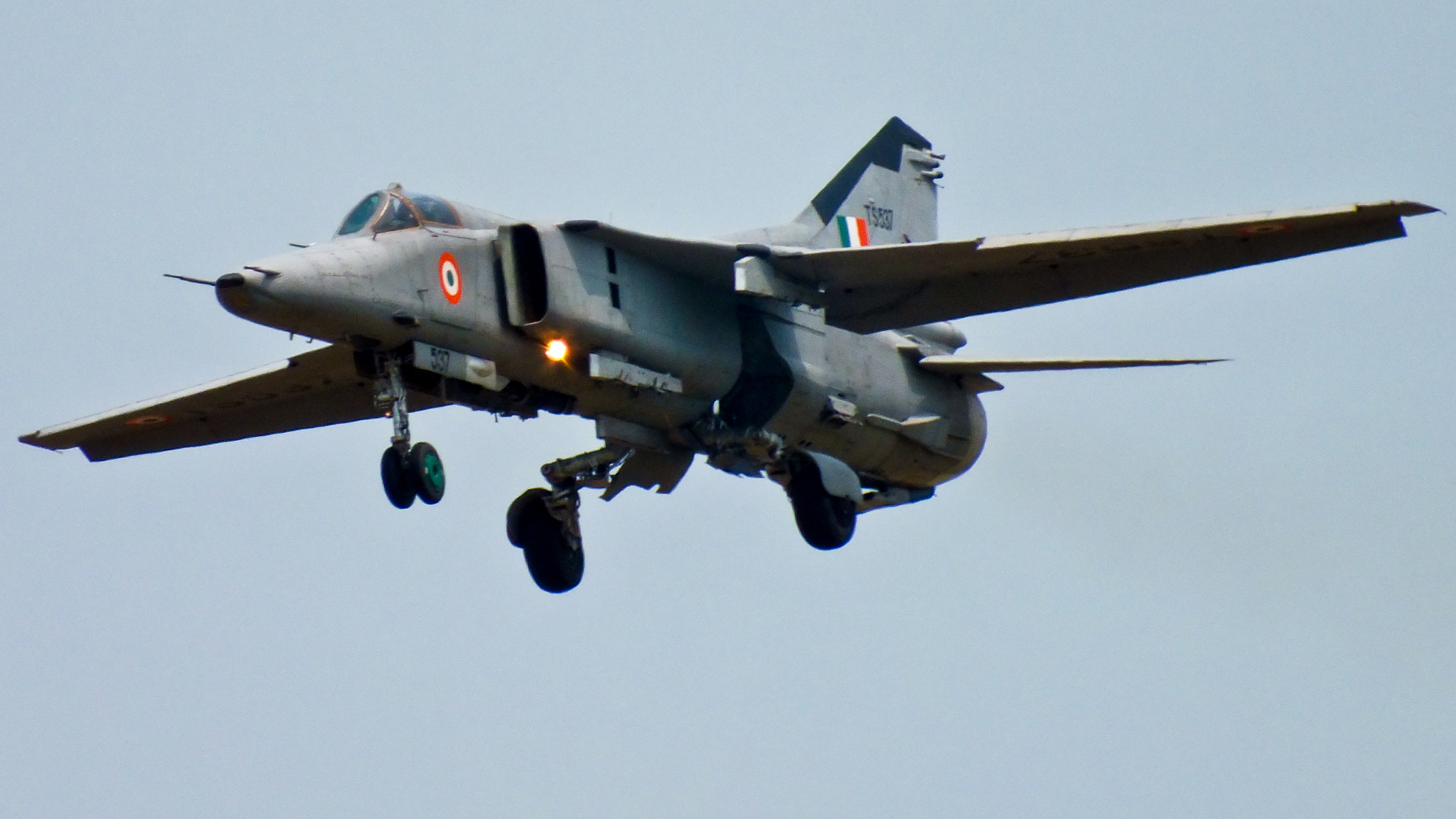
A MiG-27 of the IAF No. 18 Squadron

The MiG-27 was inducted into the Indian Air Force in 1985, several years after the induction of MiG-23s India produced a variant of the MiG-27 locally under license, first as the ML variant and later as the H variant, locally named "Bahadur" (Brave One). The entire fleet of Indian MiG-27s underwent a midlife upgrade starting in 2006 to extend its lifetime. In mid-February 2010, India grounded its entire fleet of over 150 aircraft after a MiG-27 crashed on 16 February 2010 in Siliguri, West Bengal. The crash was attributed to defects in the R-29 engines of the aircraft, suspected to have occurred during the overhauling of the aircraft by Hindustan Aeronautics Limited. Another MiG-27 crashed in the Barmer area on 27 January 2015. India retired the last MiG-27ML squadron on 27 December 2019, with a farewell ceremony at the Jodhpur airbase.

==== Kargil War ====
The Indian Air Force used various combat aircraft including the MiG-27 to bombard Pakistani positions during the Kargil War. On 27 May 1999, an Indian MiG-27L suffered an engine flameout while firing 80 mm rockets, possibly due to a MANPADS hit, and its pilot Kambampati Nachiketa was captured by the Pakistani forces.

=== Sri Lanka ===
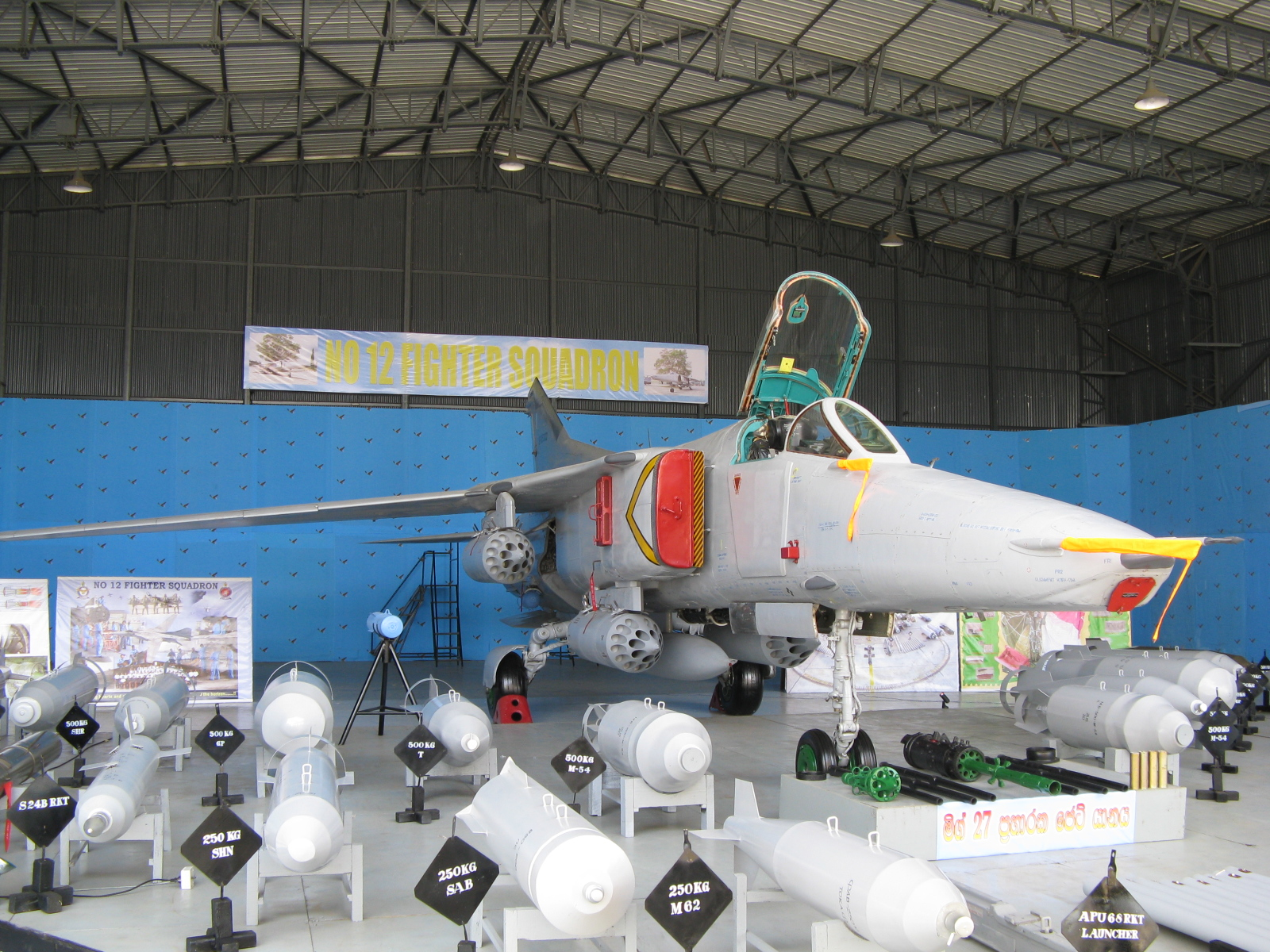
Sri Lanka Air Force MiG-27M

MiG-27 aircraft entered service with the Sri Lanka Air Force in 2000, with the purchase of four remanufactured MiG-27s from Ukrinmash in May 2000 at US$1.75 million each. This was followed by another ordered for two more in October 2000 at US$1.6 million and a MiG-23UB trainer aircraft for US$900,000. Initially piloted by Ukrainian pilots until local pilots could be trained and was attached to the No. 5 "Jet" Squadron SLAF. During the Eelam War III phase of the Sri Lankan Civil War, they saw considerable action bombing targets and providing close air support. In August 2000, a MiG-27 crashed near Colombo International Airport, killing its Ukrainian pilot. In July 2001, a second MiG-27 was destroyed and another damaged on the ground during an assault on the same air force base by the Liberation Tigers of Tamil Eelam.

A MiG-27 crashed into the sea near the airport in June 2004. With the resumption of hostilities in 2006 as peace talks broke down and the Eelam War IV phase of the war starting, MiG-27 were once again flying combat sorties. In 2007, three MiG-27s and a MiG-23UB trainer were overhauled as part of a life-extension program. Four MiG-27s were purchased at US$10 million. This led to the MiG deal scandal. The MiG-27s and the MiG-23UB were reorganized into the newly formed No. 12 Squadron. Another MiG-27 fighter jet crashed on a routine training mission on 13 February 2012 near the Dummalasuriya area at around 1.35 pm. The pilot managed to eject from the jet without sustaining injuries.

=== Kazakhstan ===
12 MiG-27s remained in service with the Kazakh Air Force until 2023 or so. In October 2023, the aircraft were retired and put up for auction. In April 2024, the Kyiv Post reported that the US purchased 81 aircraft to transfer to Ukraine. The Kazakh state-owned weapons importer and exporter Kazspetexport denied such claims, saying that foreign companies were not allowed to bid.

== Variants ==
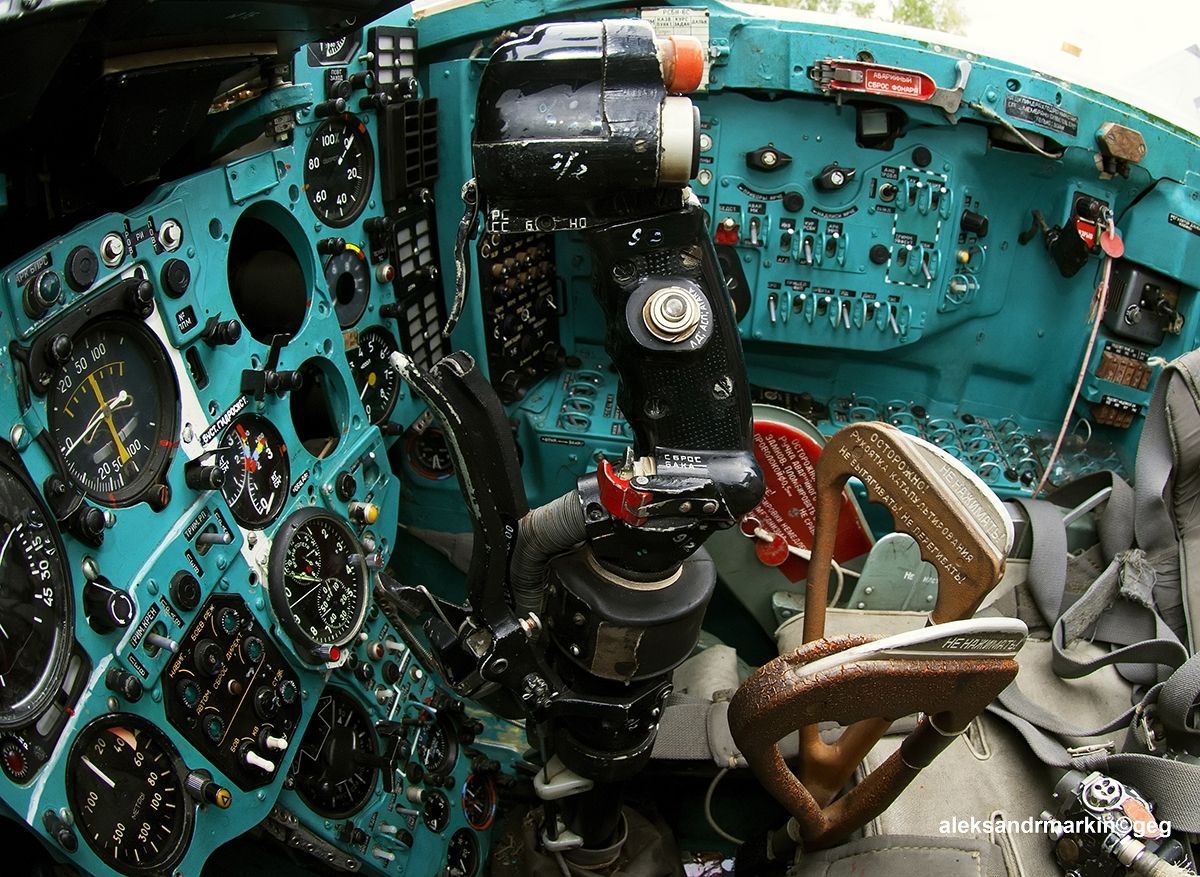
Cockpit

MiG-23B

The first Flogger attack variant was powered by the AL-21F. Only 24 were produced, due to a lack of engines (the AL-21F was destined for the Sukhoi Su-17/22 and the Su-24 Fencer). It was armed with the GSh-23L cannon, carrying 200 rounds.

MiG-23BN

Derived from the MiG-23B, but powered by the R29B-300 engine. This gave the advantage of making this variant exportable (the AL-21F was a restricted engine at the time, unlike the R29B-300). The R29B-300 also offered commonality with the MiG-23MS and MiG-23MF fighter variants already sold to the rest of world. It was armed with the GSh-23L cannon, with 200 rounds.

MiG-27 (MiG-23BM)

This was the first in the MiG-27 family to have a canopy without the central frame, suggesting that the ejection seat was designed to directly break through the transparency. The dielectric head above the pylon on the MiG-23 was used on the MiG-27 to house electro-optical and radio-frequency gear instead. It was also the first variant armed with a Gryazev-Shipunov GSh-6-30M Gatling gun. Its NATO reporting name was Flogger-D.

MiG-27K

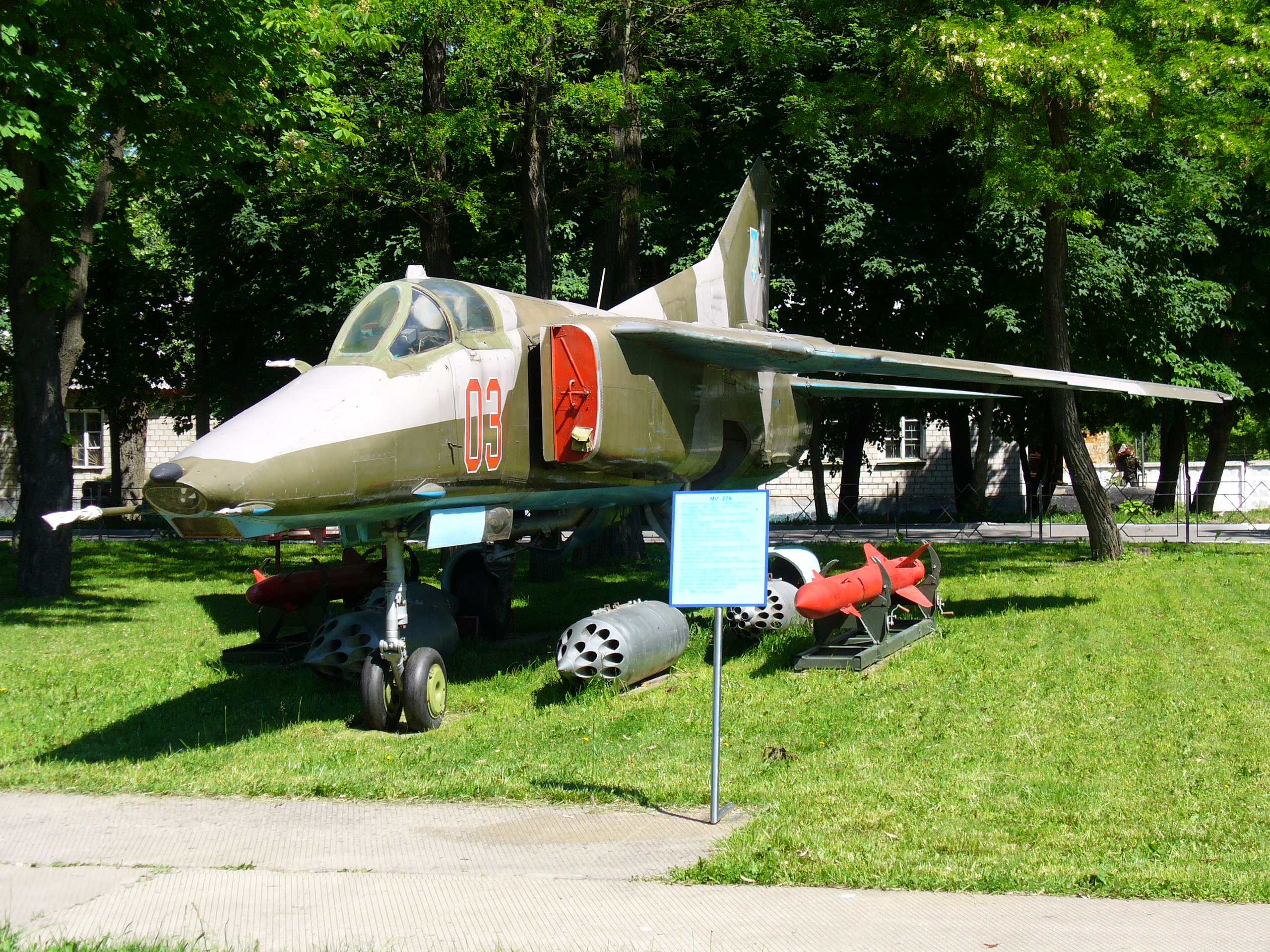
MiG-27K

NATO reporting name: Flogger-J2. The MiG-27K was the most advanced Soviet variant, with a laser designator and compatibility with TV-guided electro-optical weapons. It carried the GSh-6-30 cannon. Around 200 were built.

MiG-27M

NATO reporting name: Flogger-J. This model was a cheaper variant than the MiG-27K, but much better than the MiG-23B, MiG-23BN, and MiG-27 (MiG-23BM), with the electro-optical and radio-frequency heads above the glove pylons deleted. It was first armed with the GSh-6-23M Gatling gun, but this was later replaced by a new 30 mm GSh-6-30 six-barrel cannon with 260 rounds of ammunition in a fuselage gondola. It also received much-improved electronic countermeasure (ECM) systems, and a new PrNK-23K nav/attack system providing automatic flight control, gun firing, and weapons release. However, this modification was not very successful because of the heavy recoil from the new cannon, and bursts longer than two or three seconds often led to permanent damage to the airframe.

Test pilot V. N. Kondaurov described the first firing of the GSh-6-30А:

"As I imposed the central mark on the air target and pressed the trigger to shoot, I heard such noise that I involuntarily drew my hand aside. The whole plane began to vibrate from the shooting and had almost stopped from the strong recoil of the gun. The pilotless target, which was just making a turn ahead of me, was literally disintegrating into pieces. I have hardly come to my senses from unexpectedness and admiration: This is a calibre! Such a beast! If you hit something — it will be plenty enough [to wipe it out]".

A total of 200 MiG-27Ms were built from 1978 to 1983, plus 160 for India. Sri Lanka used second-hand Soviet MiG-27Ms.

MiG-27D

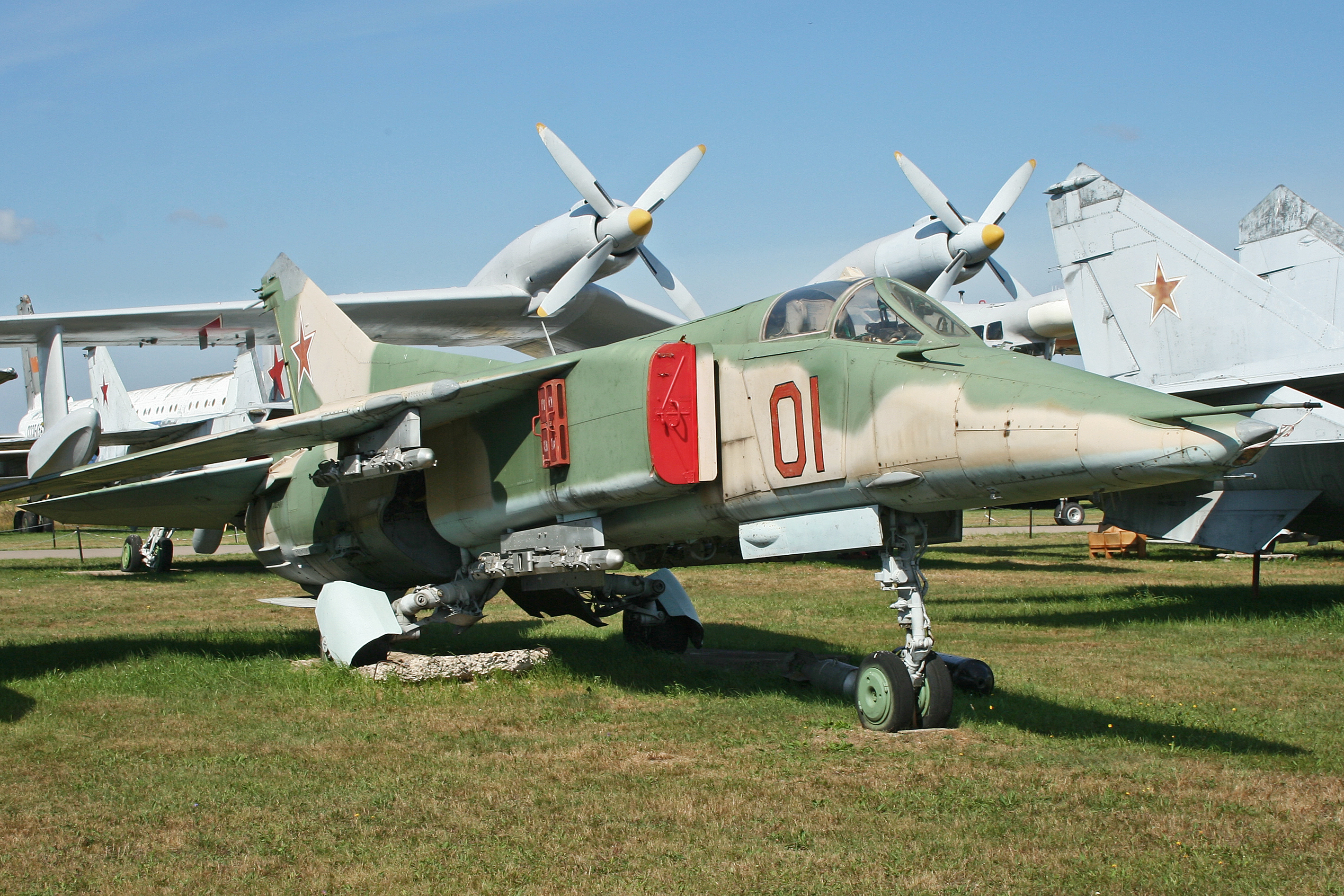
MiG-27D

All MiG-27Ds are MiG-23BMs upgraded to MiG-27M standard. It is very difficult to distinguish from the MiG-27M. 305 were upgraded.

MiG-27ML

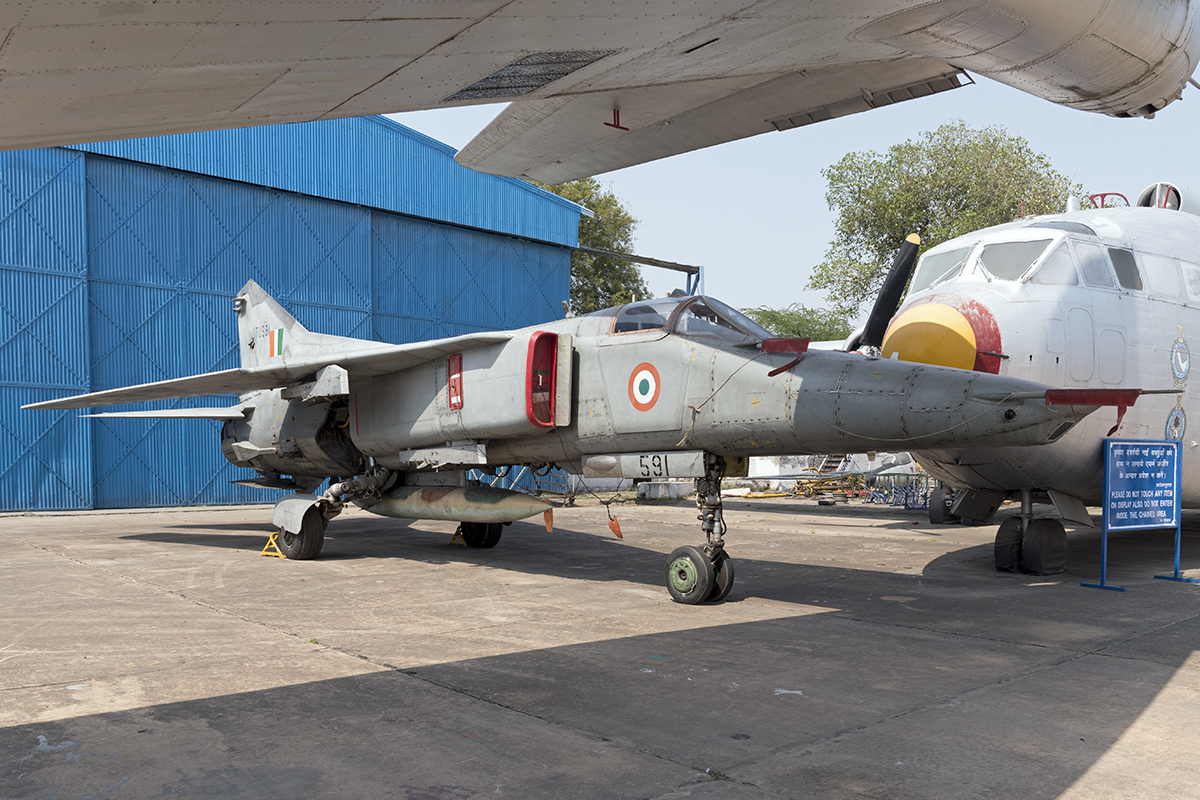
MiG-27ML 'TU591' of No. 29 Sqn. "Scorpions" at IAF Museum Palam.

This was an export variant of the MiG-27M provided in 1986 to India in knock-down kits for licensed assembly. It was the same as the MiG-27M, except the undernose fairing for the infra-red search and track (IRST) sensor had a single window instead of several, like the one on the original MiG-27M. A total of 150 were assembled by India. India refers to this model as the MiG-27M Bahadur, while MiG-27L is the Mikoyan export designation.

MiG-27H (MiG-27UPG)

This was a 2004 indigenous Indian upgrade of its license-assembled MiG-27MLs with French avionics, which provides the same level of performance, but with much reduced size and weight. The capabilities of the aircraft were being enhanced by the incorporation of modern avionics systems consisting primarily of two Multi-Function Displays (MFDs) Mission and Display Processor (MDP), Sextant Ring Laser Gyros (RLG INSI), combined GPS/GLONASS navigation, HUD with UFCP, Digital Map Generator (DMG), jam-resistant Secured Communication, stand-by UHF communication, data link and a comprehensive Electronic Warfare suite. A mission planning and retrieval facility, VTR and HUD Camera would also be fitted. The aircraft retained stand-by (conventional) instrumentation, including artificial horizon, altimeter and airspeed indicator, to cater for the failure of HUD and the MFDs. Only 40 of the 180 aircraft were converted from MiG-27ML to MiG-27UPG.

== Operators ==
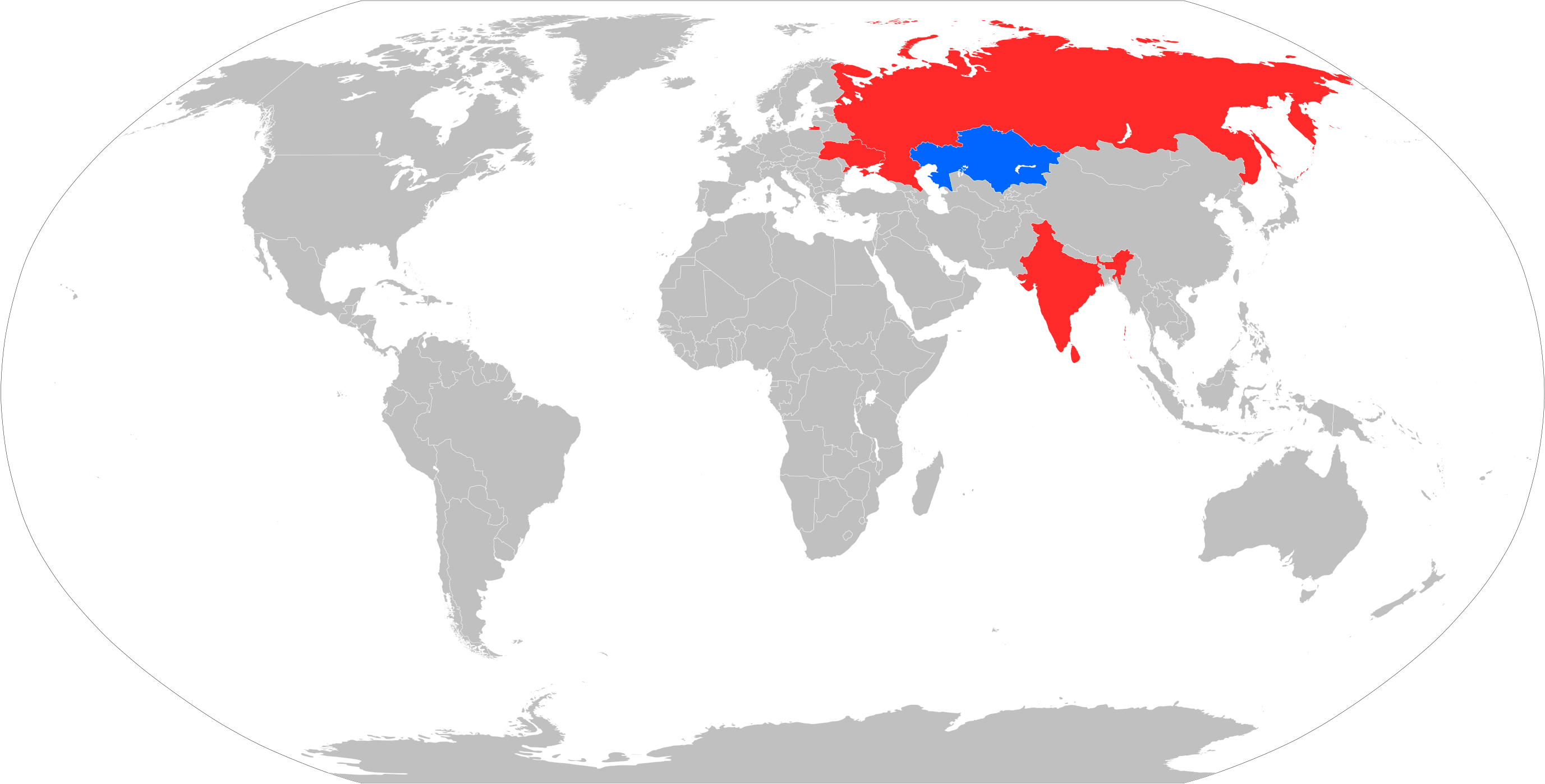
Current MiG-27 operators in blue, former operators in red

=== Former operators ===
Afghanistan

- The Afghan Air Force received MiG-27s as military aid from the Soviet Union following the Soviet withdrawal from Afghanistan.

Belarus

- The Belarusian Air Force inherited a small number of MiG-27K from the 911th Fighter-Bomber regiment based at Lida. These were scrapped or used as instructional airframes at the Minsk State Aviation College.

India

- The Indian Air Force has retired their aircraft (165 MiG-27Ms licensed built by HAL). The first batch of MiG-27ML UPG was retired in December 2017, and the final batch was retired from service on 27 December 2019.

Kazakhstan

- The Kazakh Air Force operated 12 MiG-27Ms as of December 2022. These were retired in 2023, put up for auction, and sold in April 2024.

Russia

- The Russian Air Force retired their aircraft from front-line use.

Sri Lanka

- Sri Lanka Air Force had 4 MiG-27Ms in 2011.

Ukraine

- The Ukrainian Air Force has retired their MiG-27M/D/K.

Soviet Union

- The Soviet Air Force passed their aircraft on to four of their successor states.

== Specifications (MiG-27K) ==
3-view drawing of MiG-27

Data from airforce-technology.com, deagel.com

General characteristics

- Crew: 1
- Length: 17.08 m (56 ft 0 in)
- Wingspan: 13.97 m (45 ft 10 in) wings spread

7.78 m (26 ft) wings swept

- Height: 5 m (16 ft 5 in)
- Wing area: 37.35 m^{2} (402.0 sq ft) wings spread

34.16 m^{2} (368 sq ft) wings swept

- Airfoil: root: TsAGI SR-12S (6.5%); tip: TsAGI SR-12S (5.5%)
- Empty weight: 11,908 kg (26,253 lb)
- Gross weight: 20,300 kg (44,754 lb)
- Max takeoff weight: 20,670 kg (45,570 lb)
- Powerplant: 1 × Tumansky R-29-B-300 afterburning turbojet, 78.5 kN (17,600 lbf) thrust dry, 112.8 kN (25,400 lbf) with afterburner

Performance

- Maximum speed: 1,885 km/h (1,171 mph, 1,018 kn) / M1.7 at 8,000 m (26,000 ft)

1,350 km/h (840 mph; 730 kn) / M1.09 at sea level

- Combat range: 780 km (480 mi, 420 nmi)

540 km (340 mi; 290 nmi) with two Kh-29 missiles and three drop tanks
225 km (140 mi; 121 nmi) with two Kh-29 missiles and no external fuel

- Ferry range: 2,500 km (1,600 mi, 1,300 nmi)
- Service ceiling: 14,000 m (46,000 ft)
- Rate of climb: 200 m/s (39,000 ft/min)
- Wing loading: 605 kg/m^{2} (124 lb/sq ft)
- Thrust/weight: 0.62

Armament

- Guns:
  - 1 × 30 mm Gryazev-Shipunov GSh-6-30 rotary cannon, 300 rounds, or, can be modified in a workshop to:
  - 1 × 23 mm Gryazev-Shipunov GSh-23 autocannon, 200 rounds.
  - Alternatively, a basic maintenance kit can be carried in place of a gun pod.
- Hardpoints: 1 × centerline, 4 × fuselage and 2 × wing glove pylons with a capacity of 4,000 kg (8,800 lb), with provisions to carry combinations of:
  - Rockets:
    - S-5
    - S-8
    - S-25
    - S-24
  - Missiles:
    - Air-to-air missiles:
      - R-60M
    - Air-to-surface missiles:
      - Kh-23M
      - Kh-25ML
      - Kh-29L/ML/T/D
    - Anti-radiation missiles:
      - Kh-27PS
      - Kh-31P (MiG-27K, evaluation only)
  - Bombs:
    - Dumb bombs
      - FAB-100
      - FAB-250
      - FAB-500
    - Fragmentation / HE bombs
      - OFAB-100-120
      - OFAB-250-270
    - Incendiary Bombs
      - ZAB-100-175
      - ZAB-250-200
    - Flare bombs
      - SAB-100
      - SAB-250-200
    - TV-guided bombs
      - KAB-500Kr
    - Laser-guided bombs
      - KAB-500L
    - Fuel-air bombs
      - ODAB-500S
      - ODAB-500P
      - KAB-500-OD

== See also ==
Related development

- Mikoyan-Gurevich MiG-23

Aircraft of comparable role, configuration, and era

- A-7 Corsair II
- Panavia Tornado
- IAR 93
- SEPECAT Jaguar
- Soko J-22 Orao
- Sukhoi Su-17
- Nanchang Q-5

Related lists

- List of military aircraft of the Soviet Union and the CIS
- List of fighter aircraft
