= Missionary Church =

American evangelical Christian denomination

- Classification: Protestant
- Orientation: Evangelical, Anabaptists, Pietism, Wesleyanism, Higher Life movement
- President: Rev. Rodney Arnold
- Associations: National Association of Evangelicals, Global Wesleyan Alliance, Global Fellowship of Missionary Churches
- Headquarters: Fort Wayne, Indiana
- Origin: 1969; Detroit, Michigan
- Merger of: United Missionary Church and the Missionary Church Association
- Separations: Bible Fellowship Church
- Congregations: 492 in the United States
- Members: 53,364 in the United States
- Official website: www.mcusa.org

The Missionary Church is an evangelical Christian denomination of Anabaptist origins with Wesleyan and Pietist influences.

== Faith and practice ==
The Missionary Church is a Trinitarian body which believes the Bible is the inspired Word of God and authoritative in all matters of faith; that "salvation is the result of genuine repentance of sin and faith in the atoning work of Christ"; and that the "church is composed of all believers in the Lord Jesus who have been vitally united by faith to Christ". They hold two Christian ordinances, baptism by immersion and the Lord's Supper, as outward signs, not a means of salvation.

In 2013 and 2015, the Missionary Church General Conference adopted the Articles of Faith and Practice. These serve as the denomination's shared statement of faith that all ministers and churches affirm. Often referred to as "fenceposts" by denominational leaders, they define the theological boundaries that all within the denomination abide by. Beyond that, the denomination has adopted various position papers that serve as the official stance of the denomination on various issues, though individual affirmation of each position paper is not required.

== History ==
The Missionary Church has diverse roots, especially in Anabaptism (directly through the Mennonites), German Pietism, the holiness movement, and American evangelicalism, (and to a smaller degree fundamentalism and Pentecostalism).

In the late 19th century, several Mennonite preachers embraced pietism and revivalism, and were excluded from their conferences. Among the leaders were Solomon Eby (1834–1929) of Ontario, William Gehman (1827–1917) of Pennsylvania, Daniel Brenneman (1834–1919) of Indiana, and Joseph E. Ramseyer (1869–1944). These brethren gradually found one another and their movements merged. Daniel Brenneman and Solomon Eby established the Reformed Mennonites in 1874. The Reformed Mennonites joined with some other expelled Mennonite members (called the New Mennonites) and formed the United Mennonites. In 1879 the followers of William Gehman (called Evangelical Mennonites) merged with the United Mennonites, creating the Evangelical United Mennonites. In 1883 a group from Ohio (called Brethren in Christ or Swankites) joined the movement. The denomination became the Mennonite Brethren in Christ on December 29, 1883, in Englewood, Ohio. The Mennonite Brethren in Christ changed their name to the United Missionary Church in 1947. The Mennonite Brethren in Christ Pennsylvania Conference disliked the name change and received permission to maintain their existing name. In 1952, the Pennsylvania Conference voted to secede from the United Missionary Church, and, in 1959, it would rename itself the Bible Fellowship Church.

The Missionary Church Association was founded in Berne, Indiana, in 1898. In that year, Joseph E. Ramseyer was excluded from the Égly Amish because he was rebaptized at a revival meeting. The Égly Amish rejected both the nature of the baptism (immersion) and its non-Amish and Mennonite connections (he had already been baptized by the Égly Amish). The Missionary Church Association and the United Missionary Church (formerly the Mennonite Brethren in Christ) carried on fraternal relations for many years, and then merged in 1969 to form the Missionary Church.

== Branches ==
The Missionary Church (and the movements that formed it) has experienced three divisions — the withdrawal of several leaders from the Missionary Church Association in 1923 over disagreements concerning the Holy Spirit; in 1947 the Pennsylvania Conference of the Mennonite Brethren in Christ withdrew over issues of doctrine and polity, and in 1959 became the Bible Fellowship Church; and the Missionary Church of Canada withdrew from the Missionary Church in 1987 (and merged with the Evangelical Church of Canada in 1993 to form the Evangelical Missionary Church). The first two divisions occurred because of doctrinal differences, while the third was a friendly separation in response to legal issues pertaining to the church existing in two nations, the United States and Canada.

== Organization in the USA ==
As of 2025, in the United States there were 492 congregations in 31 states and Puerto Rico, showing growth from the 463 reported in 2020. Indiana remains the geographic center of the denomination, with nearly half of its members. Ohio and Michigan also contain sizable numbers of members.

The organization of the church is divided into 11 regions. The national office is located in Fort Wayne, Indiana. Its ministries include World Partners USA, the Missionary Church Investment Foundation, U.S. Ministries, the Pastoral Leadership Institute (PLI), and Bethel University. Bethel University (Indiana), located in Mishawaka, Indiana, currently has about 1,160 students.

Also, the Missionary Church Historical Society (founded in 1979) located at Bethel University was established to maintain and keep historical records.

The Missionary Church has sought a closer return to its Mennonite roots. In 2003, the Church of the United Brethren in Christ, another body with Mennonite and Pietist heritage, began pursuing an attempt to join their 200-some churches in the United States with the Missionary Church. The leadership of both denominations were firmly behind this. However, United Brethren members in the United States voted against the idea 56% to 44%, thereby halting the discussions.

The Missionary Church is a member of the National Association of Evangelicals and the Global Wesleyan Alliance.

== Organization internationally ==
The Global Fellowship of Missionary Churches connects official Missionary Church denominations from nations around the world. Rather than worldwide churches joining Missionary Church USA, when congregations in other nations are established, those congregations join together to establish an autonomous Missionary Church denomination in that country. This has been the vision of the Missionary Church since its inception, as stated in its Constitution. This allows for local, indigenous leadership, while each denomination shares a unified statement of faith. As of 2026, thousands of churches around the world in 23 nations are members of the Global Fellowship of Missionary Churches, including:

Brazil	India	Philippines
Canada	Jamaica	Sierra Leon
Colombia	Kenya	Tanzania
Cuba	Malawi	Uganda
Dominican Republic	Mexico	USA
Ecuador	Nepal	Venezuela
Haiti	Nicaragua	Vietnam
Honduras	Nigeria	
