= Kaikhali =

- Neighbourhood
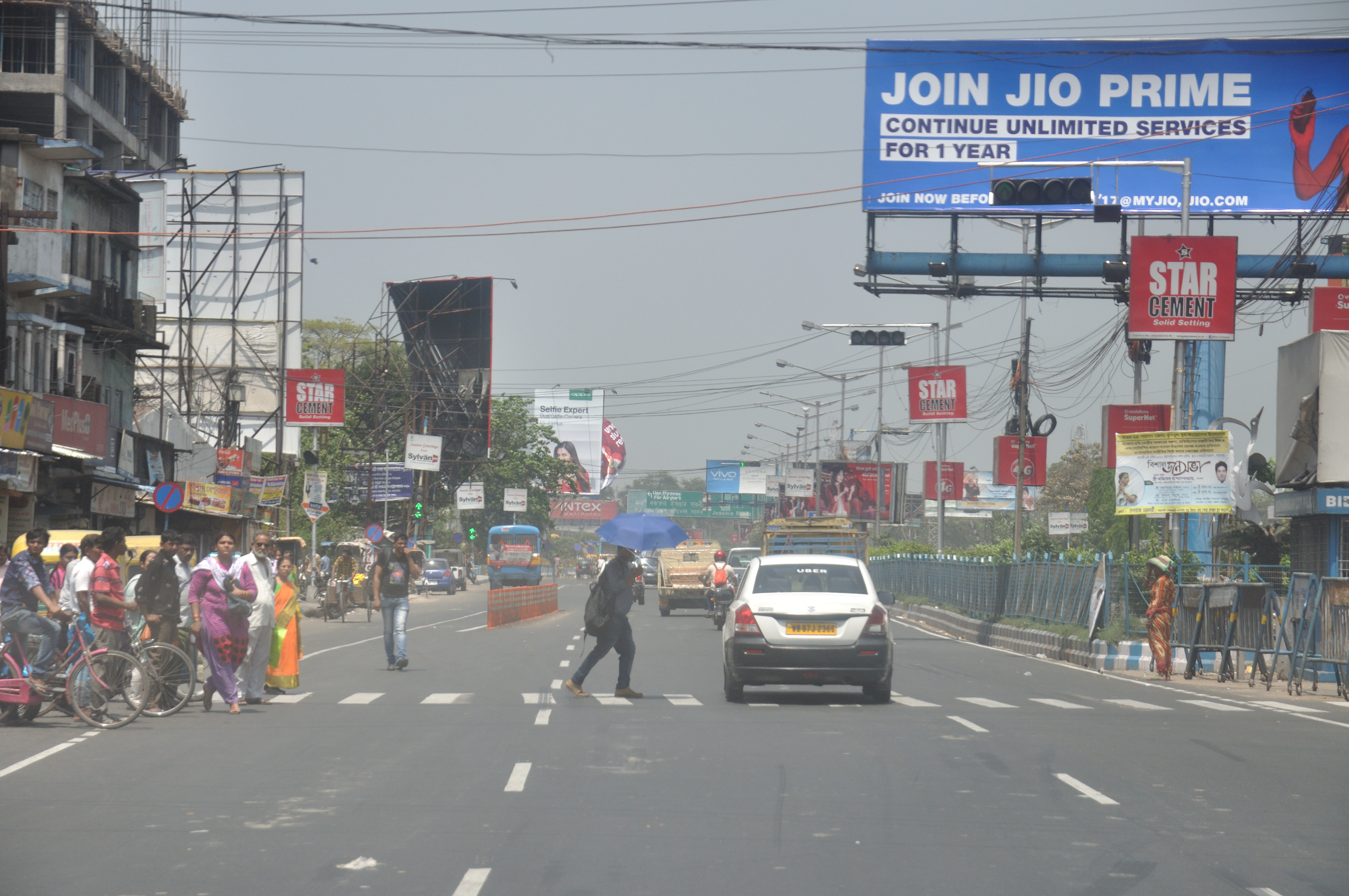
- VIP Road, Kaikhali

- Location in West Bengal, India Kaikhali (West Bengal) Kaikhali (India)
- Coordinates: 22.6351747°N 88.4392357°E
- Country: India
- State: West Bengal
- Division: Presidency
- District: North 24 Parganas
- Metro Station: Jessore Road

Government
  - Type: Municipal Corporation
  - Body: Bidhannagar Municipal Corporation

Languages
  - Official: Bengali, English
- Time zone: UTC+5:30 (IST)
- PIN: 700052, 700136
- Telephone code: +91 33
- Vehicle registration: WB
- BMC wards: 5, 6, 7
- Lok Sabha constituency: Dum Dum
- Vidhan Sabha constituency: Rajarhat Gopalpur
- Website: bmcwbgov.in

Kaikhali is a neighbourhood in Bidhannagar Municipal Corporation of North 24 Parganas district in the Indian state of West Bengal. It is a part of the area covered by Kolkata Metropolitan Development Authority (KMDA).

== Geography ==
Kaikhali is developing into an important residential and commercial centre. Lake Town, Dum Dum Park, Kestopur, Baguiati, Nagerbazar, Teghoria, Chinar Park, New Town, Salt Lake etc. are the nearby areas of Kaikhali. The area is very close to Netaji Subhas Chandra Bose International Airport (Dumdum/Kolkata Airport).

== Transport ==
A large number of buses ply along VIP Road.

Bus route numbers VS2, VS1, V1, AC2, AC37, AC39, AC23A, AC37A, AC38, AC43, AC50A, AC37C, EB12, S23A, S64, D10, C23, ACT-23, L238, D-1A, DN17, DN2/1, DN46, DN47, 45, 45A, 46, 79D, 217, 237, S-151 (Mini), S-175 (Mini), S-184 (Mini), 91, 91A, 91C etc. serves the area.
