= VIP Road, Kolkata =

Road in Kolkata, India

Kazi Nazrul Islam Avenue
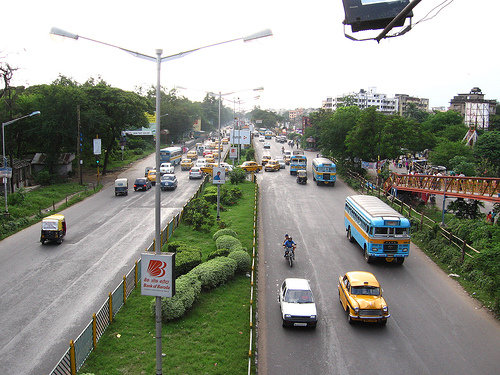
- Native name: কাজী নজরুল ইসলাম সরণি (Bengali)
- Former name: VIP Road
- Maintained by: Bidhannagar Municipal Corporation; South Dumdum Municipality; Kolkata Municipal Corporation
- Length: 8.1 km (5.0 mi)
- Location: Greater Kolkata (North 24 Parganas district and Kolkata district), India
- Nearest Kolkata Metro station: Jai Hind; VIP Road (under construction)
- north end: Netaji Subhas Chandra Bose International Airport Gate no. 1
- south end: Ultadanga

Construction
- Completed: 1962

VIP Road (officially Kazi Nazrul Islam Avenue) is a major thoroughfare connecting the city of Kolkata with Dumdum/Kolkata Airport. Located in the North-Eastern outskirts of the city, it was built in 1962 to provide speedy connection with the city and its sole airport. VIP Road is part of State Highway 3. To reduce traffic jams especially in the crossings of Kestopur and Baguiati, a flyover is constructed over the stretch between Dum Dum Park and Raghunathpur, which opened in March 2015. Another flyover connecting VIP Road with EM Bypass was opened in 2011, reducing traffic bottlenecks at Ultadanga crossing. This road is renamed after Kazi Nazrul Islam, a famous Bengali poet from India.

== Description ==
- VIP Road runs from Ultadanga (Hudco More) to Jessore Road in Dum Dum, ending near the entrance of the DumDum/Kolkata Airport, the sole airport serving the metropolis. Several locations lie along this road, such as Ultadanga, Lake Town, Bangur Avenue, Dum Dum Park, Kestopur, Baguiati, Teghoria and Kaikhali. In fact, the growth of VIP Road has facilitated the growth of these localities after independence. These localities have an extremely high population density.
- The stretch of VIP Road to the north of Baguiati is home to numerous residential complexes, hotels and shopping malls.
- VIP Road provides access to the planned township of New Town via Rajarhat Main Road at Baguiati Jora Mandir and Biswa Bangla Sarani at Haldiram (Teghoria).
- Belghoria Expressway, which provides access to NH 16 (formerly NH 6 or Bombay Road) and NH 19 (formerly NH 2), begins 2 km north of the junction with Jessore Road.
- VIP Road runs just north of Salt Lake Sector 1 and is well-connected to it by several footbridges and kheyas. Lake Town Footbridge leads to the part of Salt Lake from where one can easily reach 4 no tank. Similarly, the footbridge at Kestopur leads to Baishakhi bus stop in Salt Lake.

== Landmarks ==
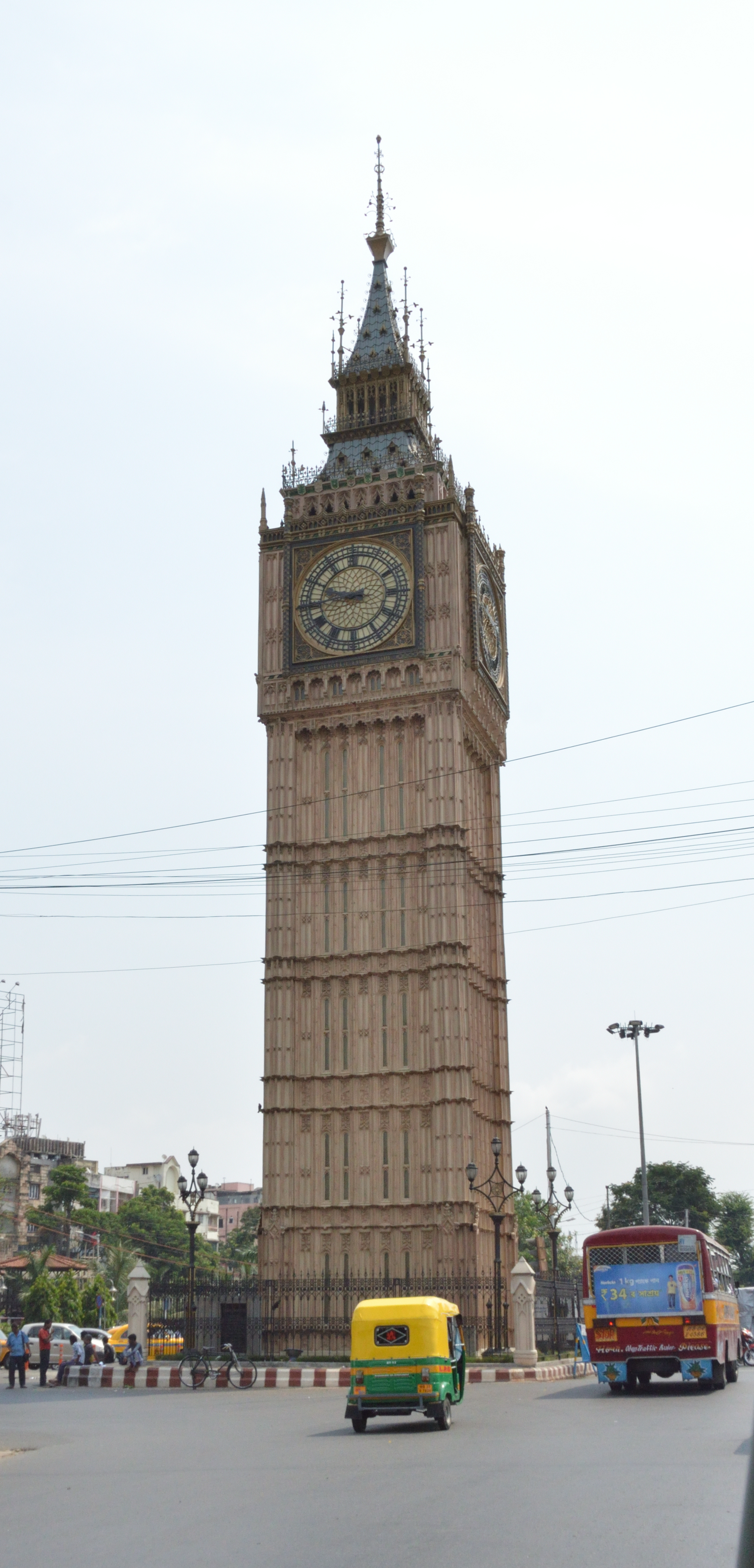
Big Ben replica, Lake Town

- Eastern Paper Mills, Lake Town
- Kolkata Time Zone Tower a 30-metre Big Ben replica, Lake Town
- Famous Baguiati Bazaar
- Big Bazaar, Baguiati
- Bazaar Kolkata and Vishal Mega Mart, Baguiati
- Haldiram Bhujiawala Pure Foods, Teghoria
- 2CBPO Military Camp
- Dumdum/Kolkata Airport

== Legacy ==
VIP Road was renamed after the Bengali poet Kazi Nazrul Islam.

== In popular culture ==
Feluda (aka Pradosh Chandra Mitter) and his friend Jatayu (aka Lal Mohon Ganguly) and Felu's cousin Topshe (aka Tapesh Ranjan Mitter) are seen in a taxi driving down VIP Road towards Dum Dum Airport in a taxi in the movie Bombaiyer Bombete.

== Alternate route ==
Another bypass route (Biswa Bangla Sarani) to Dumdum/Kolkata Airport via New Town is created, which connects Haldirams on VIP Road to Chingrighata on EM Bypass, passing through Salt Lake and New Town.

== Gallery ==
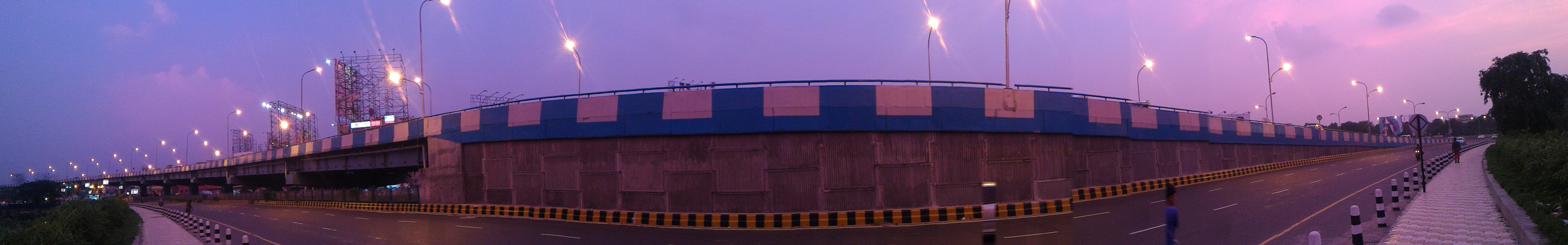
Panorama of the flyover above VIP Road in the crossing of Baguiati. The right end of the flyover leads to Dum Dum Park, Bangur Avenue, Lake Town, Ultadanga and the left end leads to Raghunathpur, Teghoria, Kaikhali, Netaji Subhas Chandra Bose International Airport.
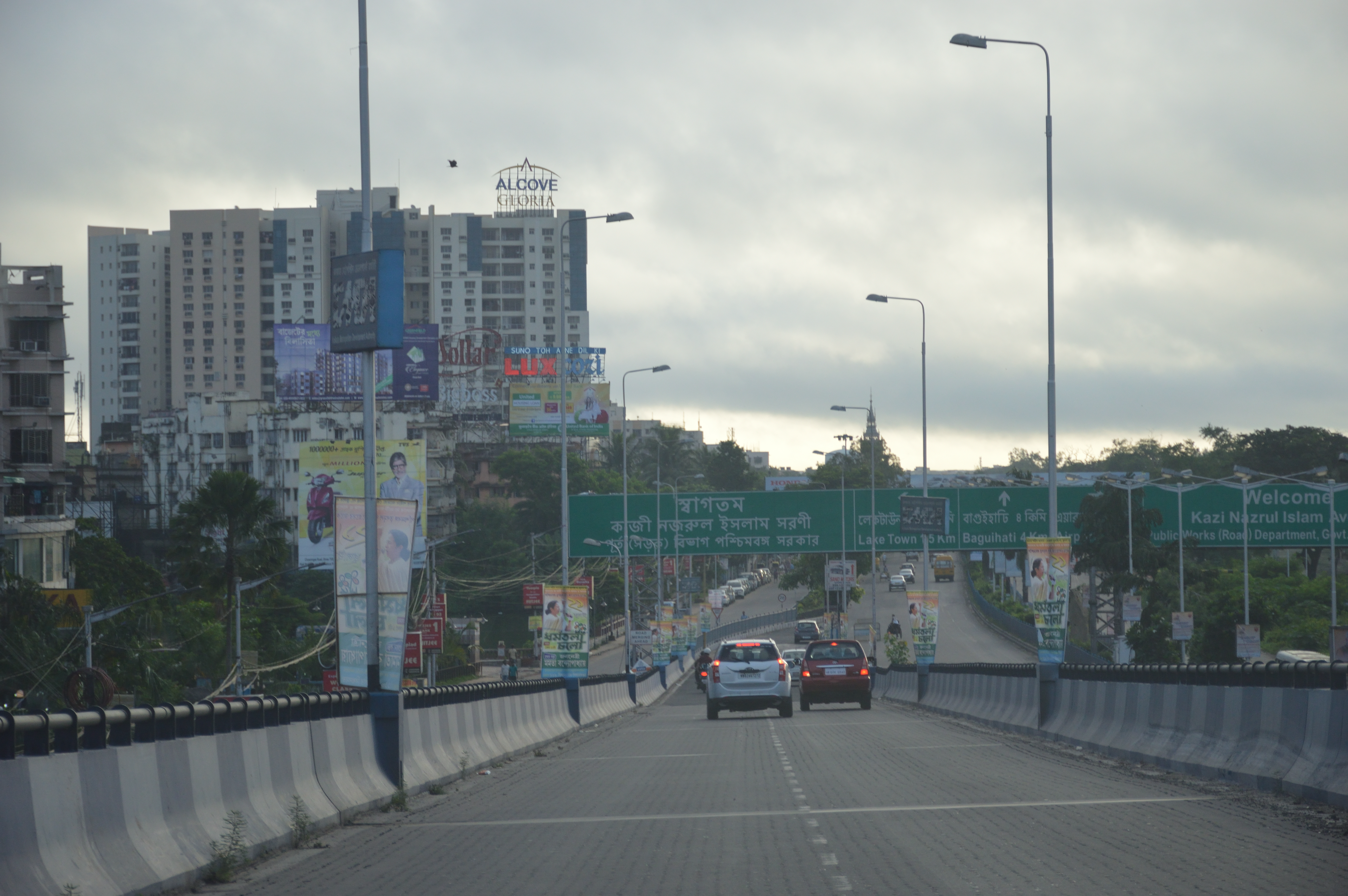
Ultadanga Flyover ending point, VIP Road, Dakshindari, Lake Town

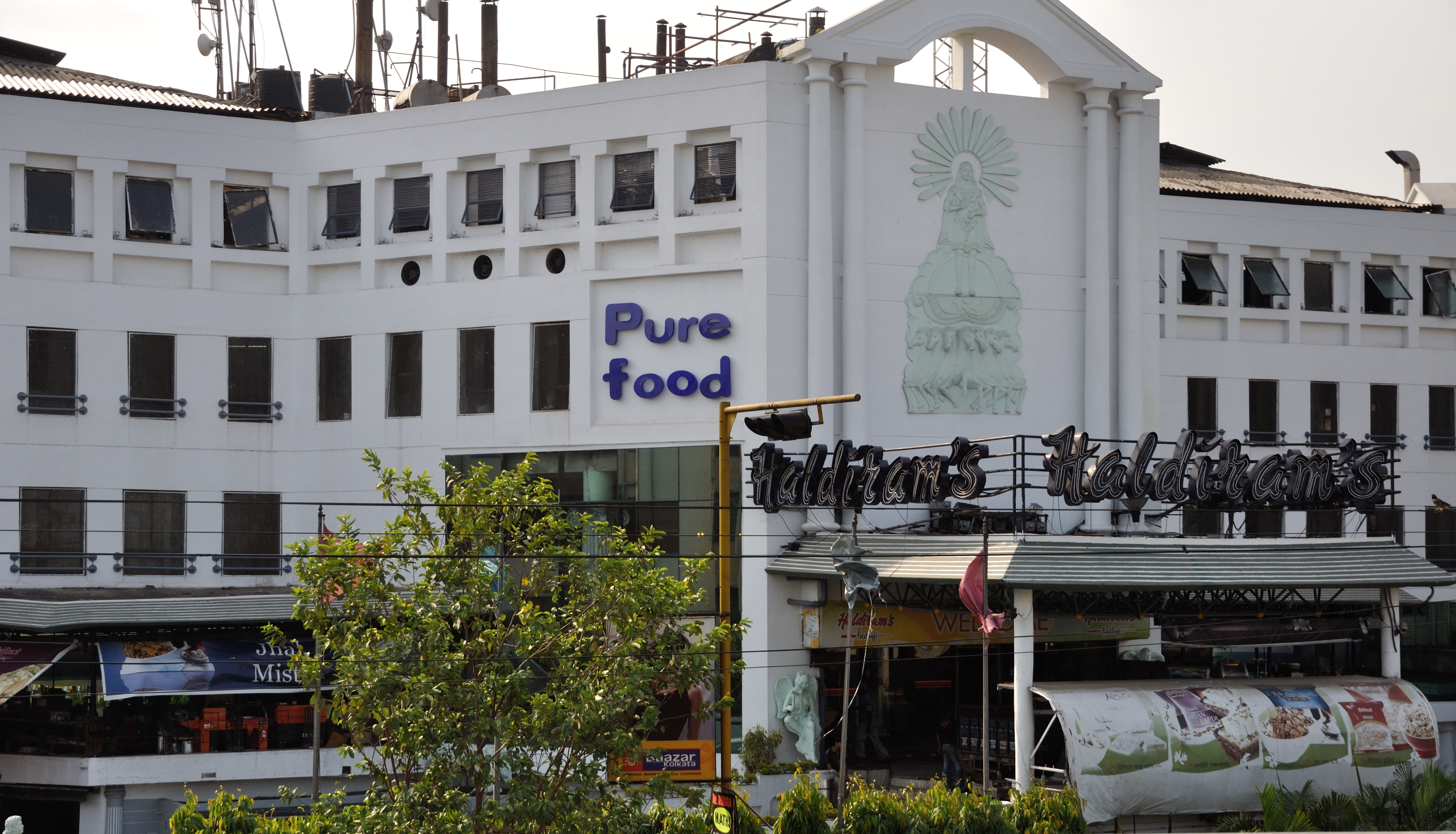
Haldiram Bhujiawala Pure Foods, VIP Road, Teghoria

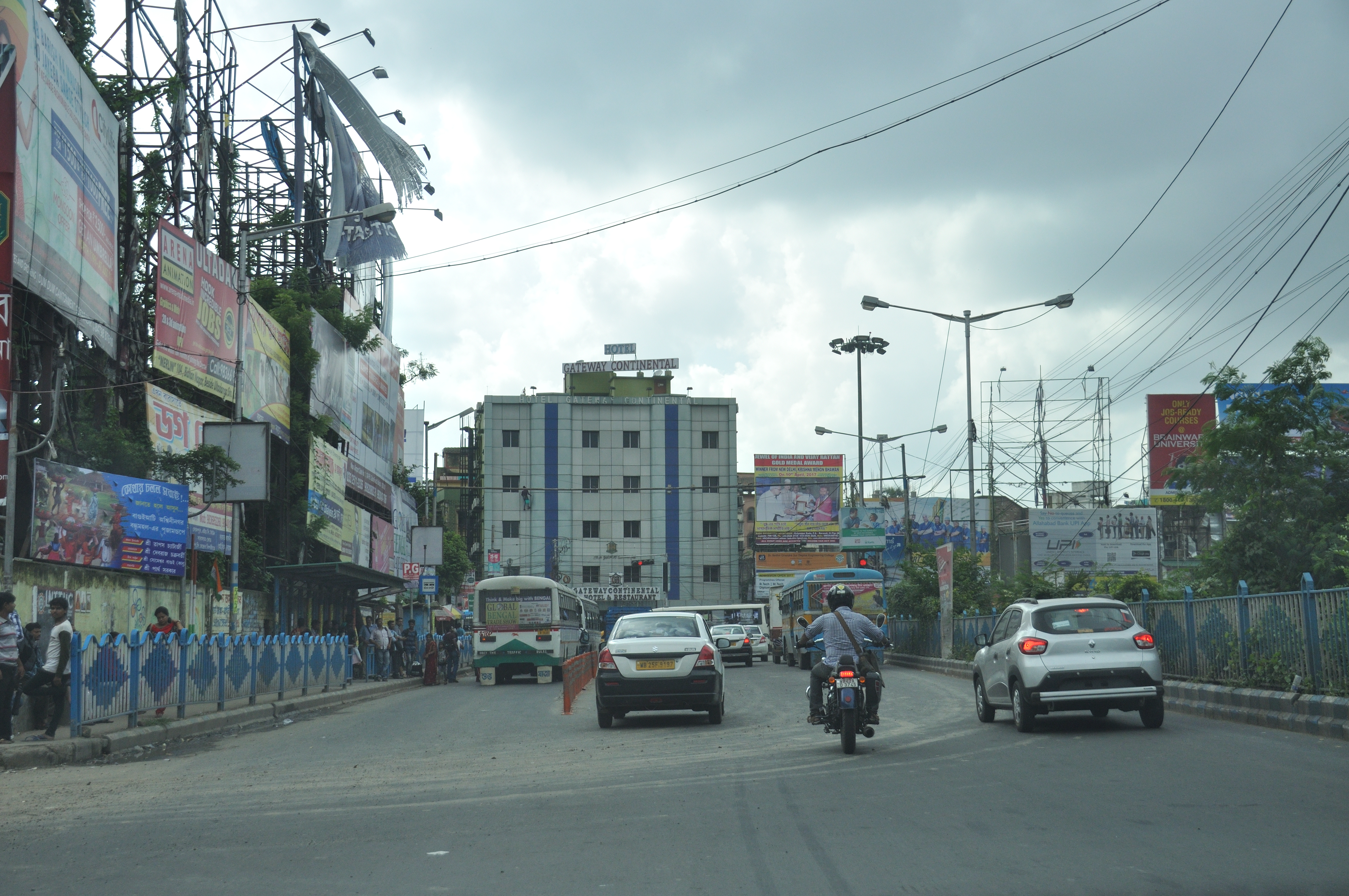
VIP Road with Jessore Road Junction, Kolkata Airport Gate No 1
