= Dum Dum Park =

- Neighbourhood
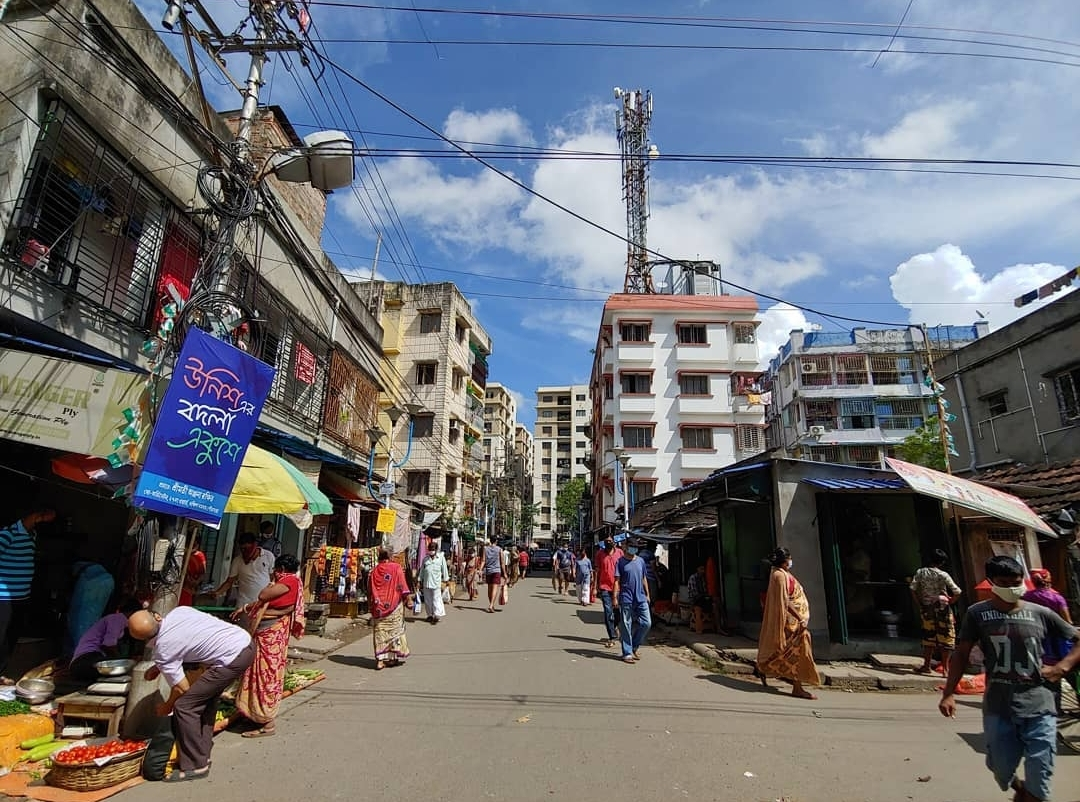
- Dum Dum Park

- Location in West Bengal, India Dum Dum Park (West Bengal) Dum Dum Park (India)
- Coordinates: 22.610239°N 88.414350°E
- Country: India
- State: West Bengal
- Division: Presidency
- District: North 24 Parganas
- Metro Station: Belgachia; Dum Dum

Government
  - Type: Municipality
  - Body: South Dumdum Municipality

Languages
  - Official: Bengali, English
- Time zone: UTC+5:30 (IST)
- PIN: 700055
- Telephone code: +91 33
- Vehicle registration: WB
- Vidhan Sabha constituency: Bidhannagar

Dum Dum Park is a neighbourhood in South Dumdum of North 24 Parganas district in the Indian state of West Bengal. It is a part of the area covered by Kolkata Metropolitan Development Authority (KMDA).

== Geography ==
=== Police station ===
Lake Town police station under Bidhannagar Police Commissionerate has jurisdiction over Dum Dum Park areas.

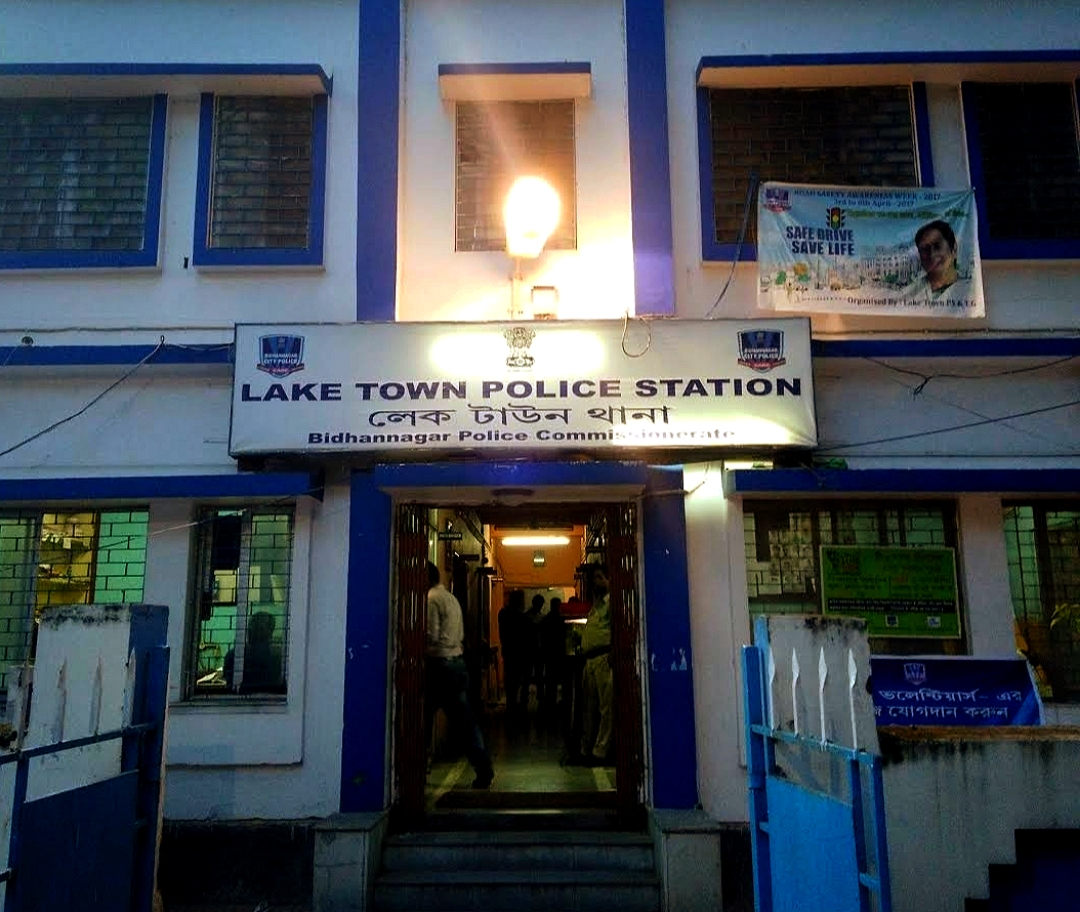
Lake Town police station

=== Post office ===
Dum Dum Park has a non-delivery sub post office, with PIN 700055 in the Kolkata East Division of North 24 Parganas district in Calcutta region. Other post offices with the same PIN are Bangur Avenue and Shyamnagar.

== Durga Puja ==
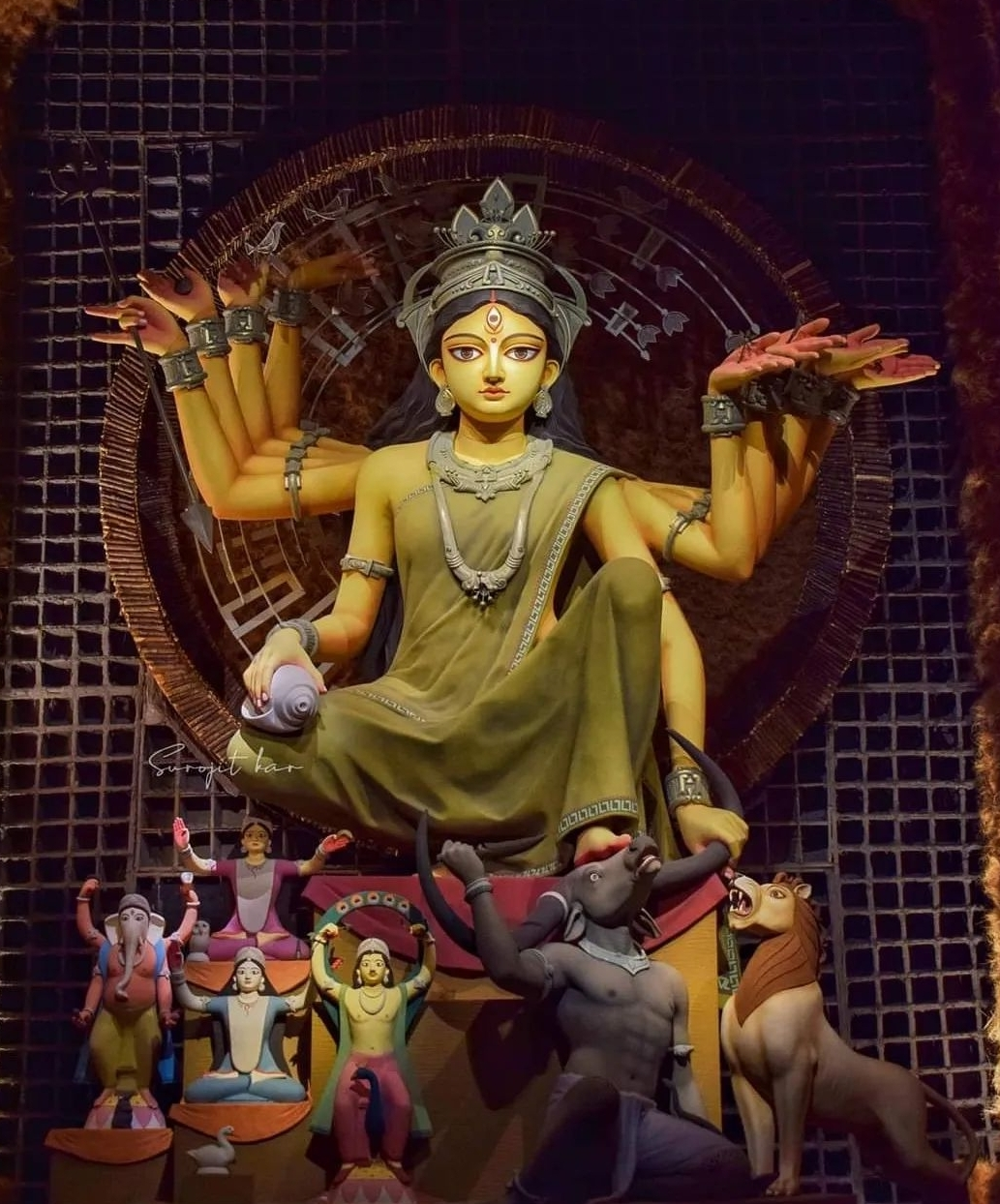
Dum Dum Park Tarun Sangha 2023

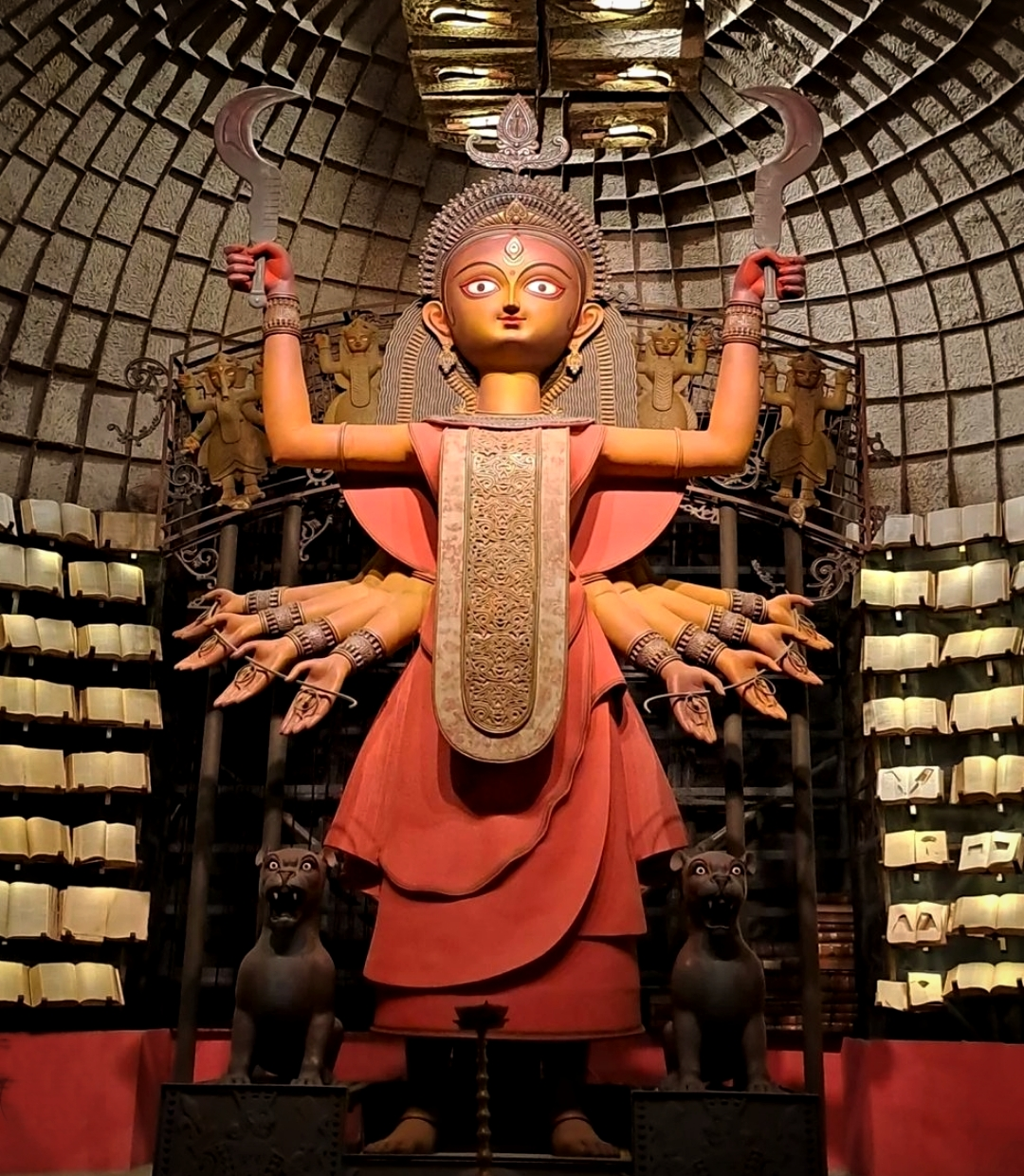
Dum Dum Park Tarun Dal 2023

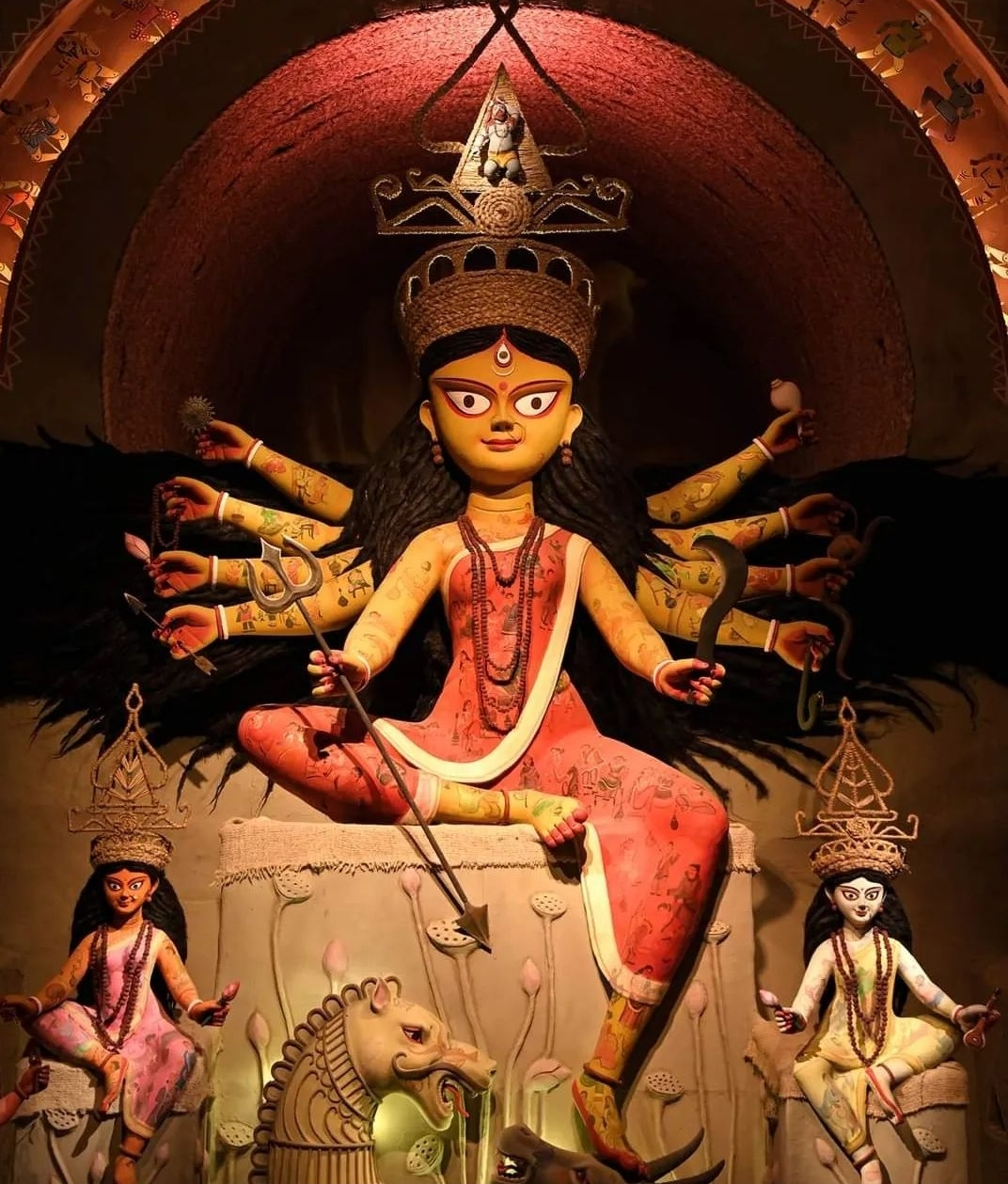
Dum Dum Park Bharat Chakra 2022

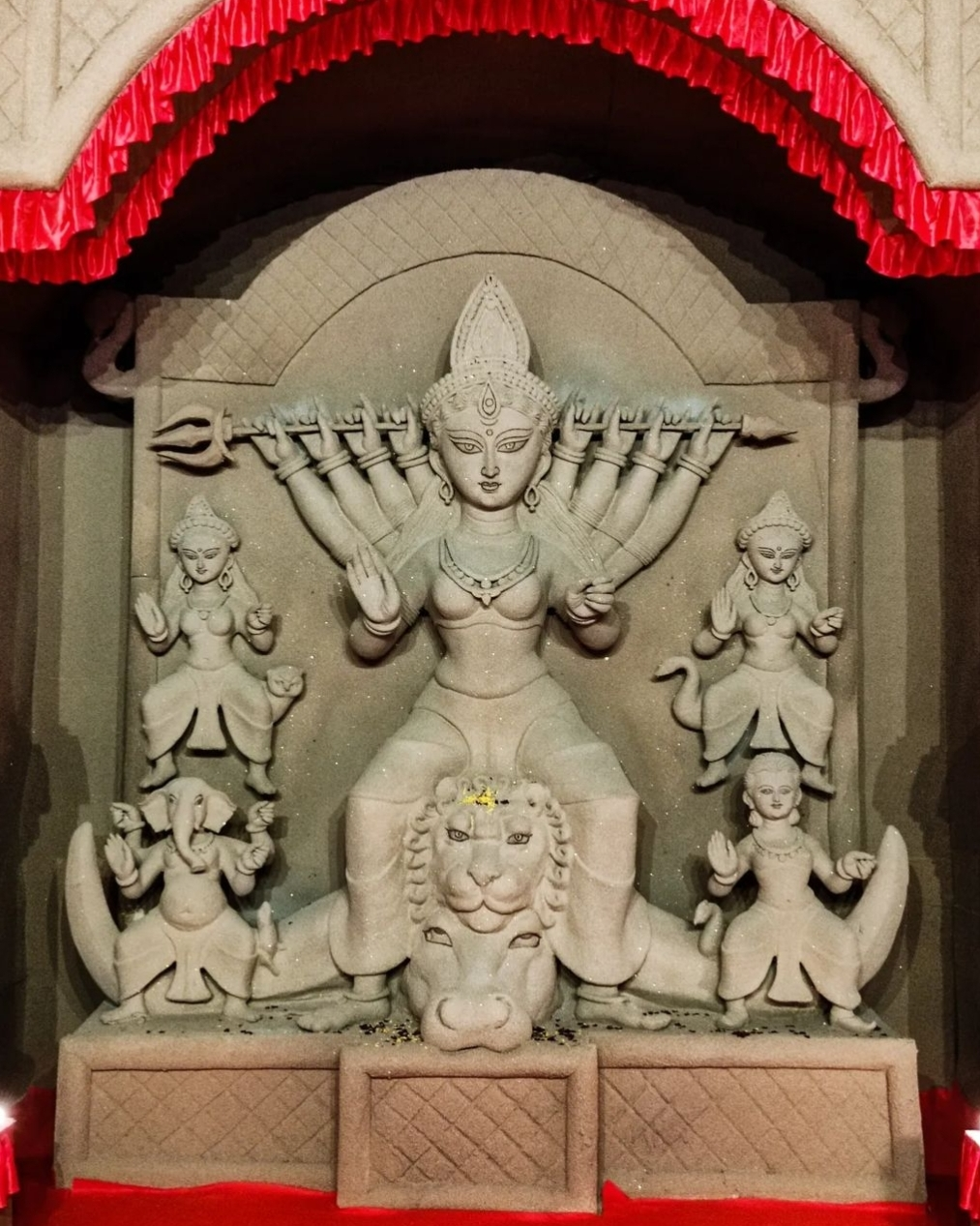
Dum Dum Park Yubak Brinda 2022

In recent years, several organizations in Dum Dum Park, including Dum Dum Park Tarun Sangha, Dum Dum Park Bharat Chakra, Dum Dum Park Tarun Dal, Dum Dum Park Yubak Brinda, and Dum Dum Park Sarbojanin Durga Puja Samity, have organized them-based Durga Puja celebrations.

== Transport ==
=== Bus ===
Buses ply along Jessore Road and VIP Road are:

==== WBTC Bus ====
- AC 39 Airport - Howrah Stn
- VS 2 Airport - Howrah Stn
- V 1 Airport - Tollygunge
- AC 37C Airport - Garia
- AC 37 Barasat - Garia
- AC 50A Garia - Rajchandrapur
- AC 2 Barasat - Howrah Stn
- EB-13 Hatisala - Howrah Stn
- S 64 Naihati - Newtown
- AC 40 Airport - Howrah Maidan

==== Private Bus ====
- 3C/1 Nagerbazar - Anandapur
- 3C/2 Nagerbazar - Anandapur
- 12C/2 Dum Dum Park - Howrah station
- L238 Barasat - Howrah station
- 30C Hatiara - Babughat
- 30C/1 Hatiara - Babughat
- 30D Dum Dum Cantonment - Babughat
- 44 Baguiati - Howrah Station
- 44/1 Baguiati - Howrah Station
- 45 Kolkata Airport - Baishnabghata Patuli
- 46 Kolkata Airport - Esplanade
- 46B New Town - Esplanade
- 79B Barasat - Bagbazar
- 79D Madhyamgram - Babughat
- 91 Bhangar Kanthalia - Shyambazar
- 91A Haroa - Shyambazar
- 91C Lauhati - Shyambazar
- 93 Kharibari - Bagbazar
- 211 Kharibari/Patharghata - Ahiritola
- 211A Langolpota - Ahiritola
- 211B Ganraguri - Ahiritola
- 215 New Town - Howrah Station
- 217 Beraberi - Babughat
- 217A Narayanpur - Babughat
- 217B Bablatala - Babughat
- 219 Nagerbazar - Howrah Station
- 221 Nagerbazar - Golpark
- 223 B.T. College - Golf Green
- 227 Bangur Avenue - BNR Colony
- 237 Birati Tantkal - Babughat
- 253 Basirhat - Esplanade
- KB16 Bangur Avenue - New Town Shapoorji Housing Estate
- KB21 Ganganagar - Science City
- DN8 Barasat - Salt Lake Karunamoyee
- DN16/1 Barasat - Dhamakhali
- DN18 Shyambazar - Baduria

==== Mini Bus ====
- S175 New Barrackpore - Howrah Stn
- S151 Kolkata Airport - B.B.D. Bagh
- S152 Baguiati - B.B.D. Bagh
- S172 Teghoria Haldirams - Howrah Maidan
- S184 Birati railway station - B.B.D. Bagh

=== Air ===
The Netaji Subhash Chandra Bose International Airport, Kolkata is at a distance of about 5.00 kilometres from Dum Dum Park.

=== Major Roads ===
- VIP Road
- Jessore Road

Shyambazar Five Point Crossing is at a distance of 4.2 kilometres from Dum Dum Park More.

== Shopping ==
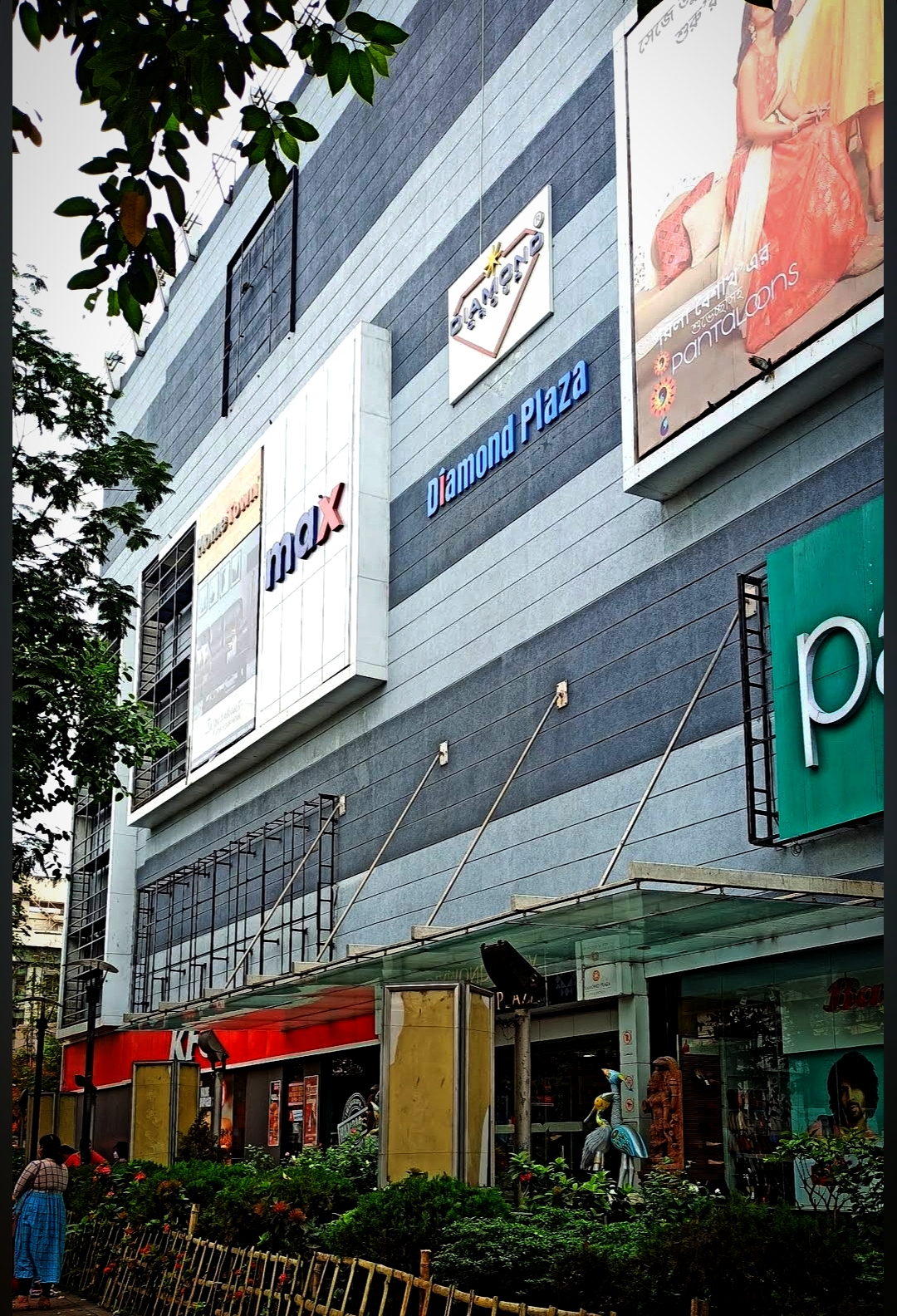
Diamond Plaza Mall, Jessore Rd (Shyamnagar-Satgachi)

Diamond Plaza Mall, one of the major shopping mall in Dum Dum area and around North Kolkata.

== Markets ==
Markets in or near Dum Dum Park area are:

- Dum Dum Park Market
- Nagerbazar Market

== Healthcare ==
- R. G. Kar Medical College and Hospital Kolkata, is located around 3.50 kilometres from Dum Dum Park.
- ILS Hospitals Dum Dum, one of the renowned multispeciality hospitals in the Kolkata Metropolitan Area, is located around 1.80 kilometres from Dum Dum Park.
- Charnock Super Speciality Hospital is located around 4.20 kilometres from Dum Dum Park.
