= Biswa Bangla Sarani =

Major arterial road in Kolkata, India

- NH12 highlighted in red
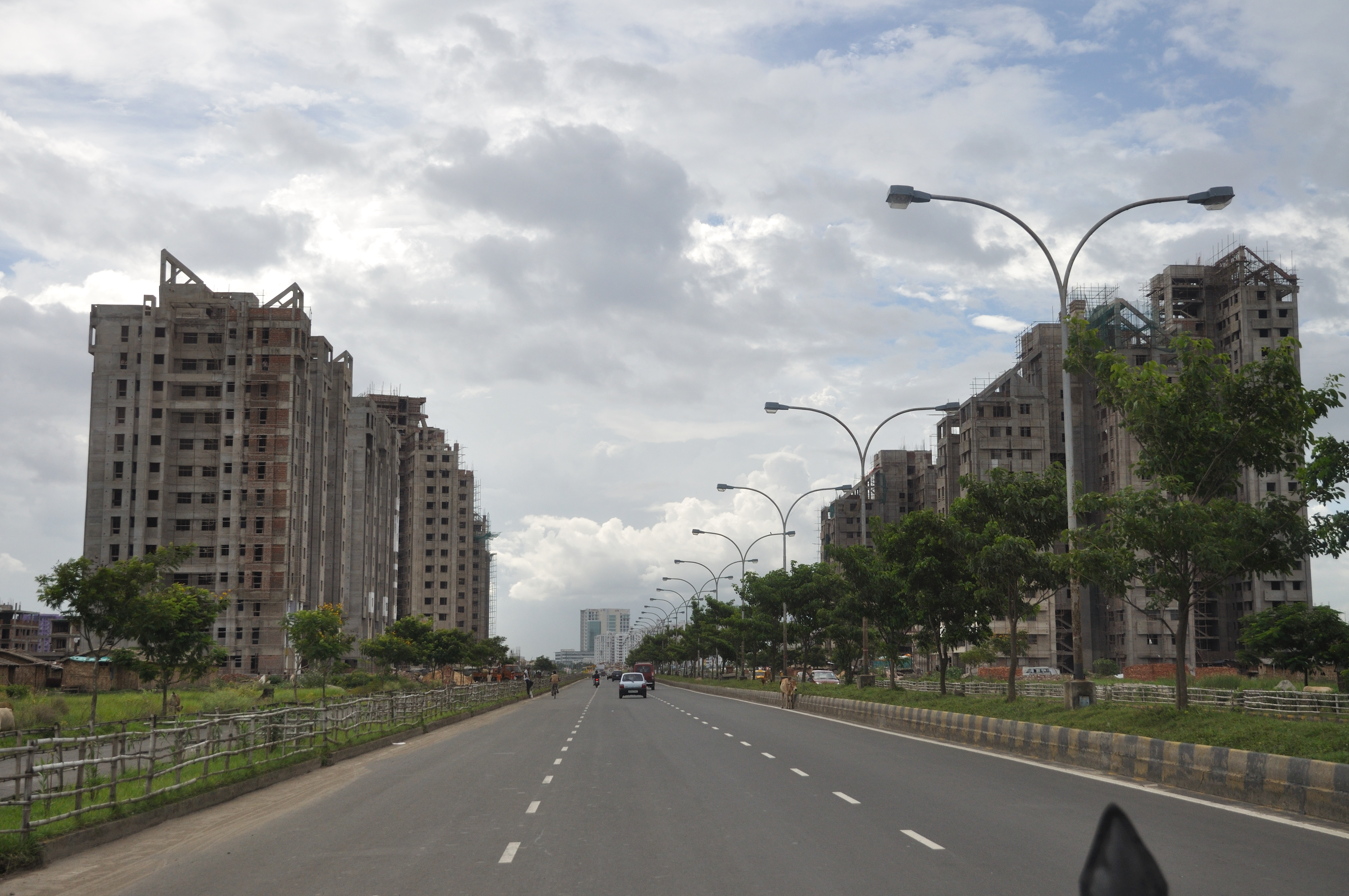

Route information
- Length: 33 km (21 mi)

Major junctions
- North end: NSCBI Airport
- Kolkata Airport-Kaikhali-Haldiram (Teghoria)-New Town-Salt Lake-Chingrighata-Dhapa-Science City-VIP Bazar-Ruby-Kalikapur-Mukundapur-Ajoy Nagar-Patuli-Garia Dhalai Bridge-Garia Kamalgazi
- South end: Garia Kamalgazi

Location
- Country: India
- States: West Bengal
- Major cities: Kolkata

Highway system
- Roads in India; Expressways; National; State; Asian

Biswa Bangla Sarani is a 33 km long road in Kolkata Metropolitan Area, India. It starts from Netaji Subhas Chandra Bose International Airport and ends at Garia Kamalgazi. The road passes through Kaikhali, Haldiram (Teghoria), New Town, Salt Lake, Chingrighata, Dhapa, Science City, VIP Bazar, Ruby, Kalikapur, Mukundapur, Ajoy Nagar, Patuli, Briji and ends in Garia Kamalgazi. This road is known by different names in different parts of its way. This road connects the Garia area of South Kolkata with Kolkata Airport easily through Salt Lake and New Town. The length of the road is approximately 33 kilometers. The road is of 6 lanes in New Town part and the bypass is of 4 lanes. Efforts are being made to upgrade the part of bypass into 8 lanes.

== The main junction ==
Kolkata Airport-Haldirams-Chinar Park-City Centre 2-Shrachi More-Akankha More-Eco Park-Owl More-Westin Signal-Biswa Bangla Gate-New Town-Salt Lake Sector V-Chingrighata-Science City-Ruby-Mukundapur-Garia Dhalai Bridge-Garia Kamalgazi.
