= Kestopur =

Neighbourhood of Kolkata, India

- Neighbourhood
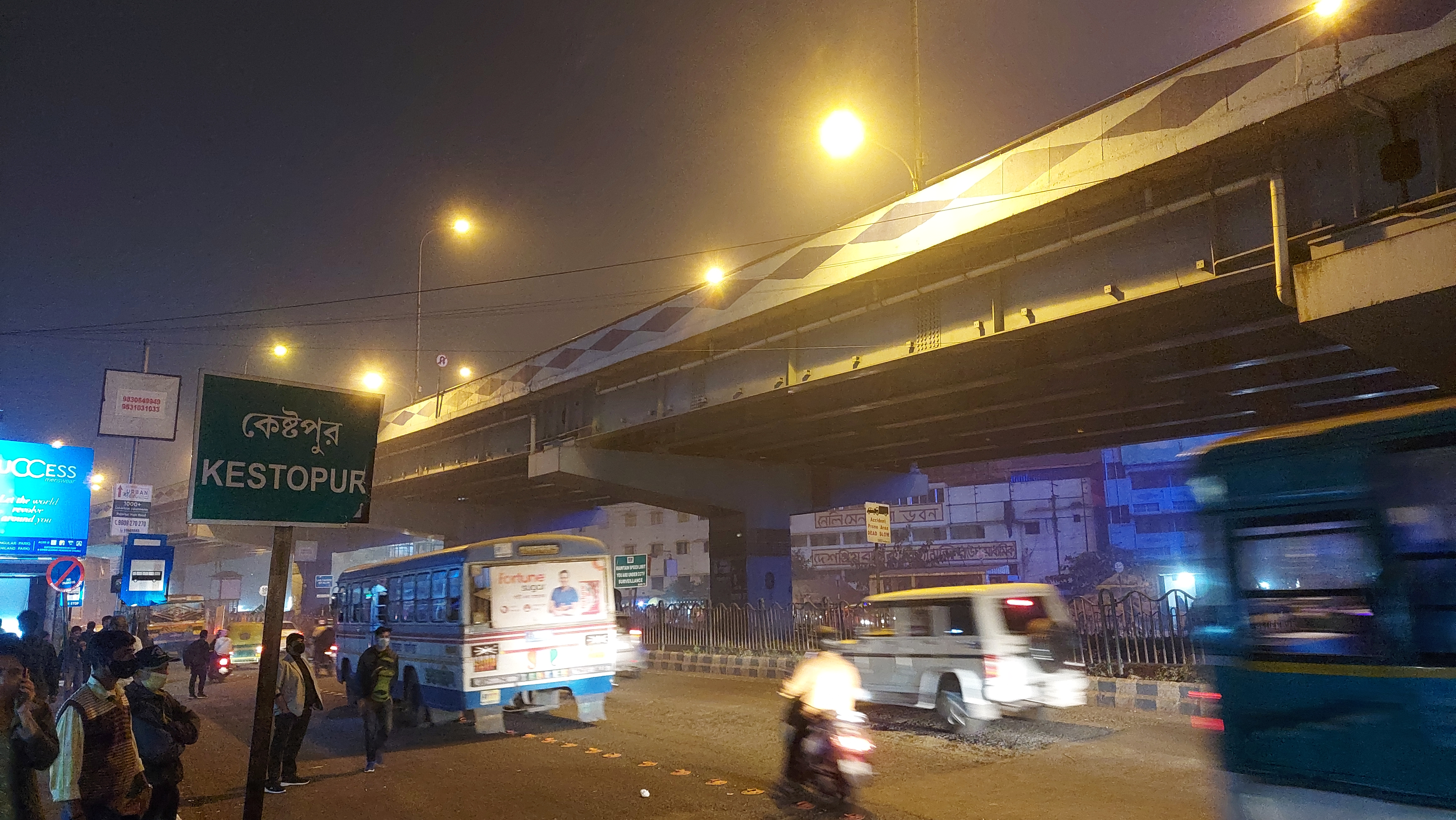
- Kestopur Bus Stop

- Location in West Bengal, India Kestopur (West Bengal) Kestopur (India)
- Coordinates: 22.5955°N 88.4357°E
- Country: India
- State: West Bengal
- City: Kolkata
- Division: Presidency
- District: North 24 Parganas
- Metro Station: Karunamoyee (E-W) Belgachia (N-S)

Government
  - Type: Municipal Corporation
  - Body: Bidhannagar Municipal Corporation

Languages
  - Official: Bengali, English
- Time zone: UTC+5:30 (IST)
- PIN: 700059,700101, 700102
- Telephone code: +91 33
- Vehicle registration: WB
- BMC wards: 22, 23, 24, 25, 26
- Lok Sabha constituency: Dum Dum
- Vidhan Sabha constituency: Rajarhat Gopalpur
- Website: bmcwbgov.in

Kestopur is a neighbourhood of Kolkata under Bidhannagar Municipal Corporation in North 24 Parganas district in the Indian state of West Bengal. It is a part of the area covered by Kolkata Metropolitan Development Authority (KMDA).

== Geography ==
Kestopur lies on Kazi Nazrul Islam Sarani, more commonly known as VIP Road, which connects the area with Dumdum/Kolkata Airport. The community is made up of people of various religions from different states. Kestopur has over the years become an area of great prominence because of its proximity to areas like Salt Lake and New Town. VIP Road-Kestopur crossing was one of the busiest of the Kazi Nazrul Islam Sarani. However the construction of a flyover along with subway at the crossing (the subway was opened on 24 June 2014 and the flyover on 8 March 2015) helps in decongesting the traffic at the junction and nearby areas.

== Education ==
- St. Francis Academy
- The Assembly Of God Church School
- Krishnapur JNMC High School
- Neli Sengupta Bhavan & Deshapriya Balika Bidya Mandir
- Vaishno devi academy
- Prafulla Kanan Deshapriya Vidyamandir (H.S.)

== Transport ==
VIP Road passes along the west boundary of Kestopur. Many buses ply through 'Kestopur More' on VIP Road. The only bus which enters into Kestopur is 12C/2 (Aquatica-Howrah Station), which runs along Thakdari Road (Krishnapur Main Road).

Road Network

Kestopur’s road system is anchored by two major arterial roads: Kestopur Main Road and Canal Side Road.

Kestopur Main Road begins at Belgachia Road in the west and passes through Dumdum Park, Shyamnagar, and Prafulla Kanan, where it continues as Prafulla Kanan Road. It merges with the western flank of VIP Road, providing access to the airport and central Kolkata. From the eastern flank, it passes through Rabindrapally, Samarpally, Mission Bazar, and continues toward Aquatica in New Town, while providing connections to Biswa Bangla Sarani and Salt Lake Sector V. This road serves as the main corridor linking residential, commercial, and IT hubs, supporting both local traffic and commuter movement.

Canal Side Road runs parallel to Kestopur Main Road, connecting VIP Road to Mission Bazar and continuing toward New Town, forming a crucial east–west corridor. It is directly linked to the Salt Lake–Kestopur Bridge, enhancing access to Salt Lake. The road intersects Kestopur Main Road via internal connecting streets, and the two roads converge at Mission Bazar, creating a unified arterial network that integrates the locality.

Together, these two roads form the primary transportation framework of Kestopur, supporting heavy vehicular traffic, bus routes, and regional connectivity to New Town, Salt Lake, VIP Road, and surrounding areas.

Metro Connectivity

Kestopur is served by several metro stations on both the East–West and North–South corridors:

- Karunamoyee Metro Station (East–West Line) – 2.2 km
- Salt Lake Sector V Metro Station (East–West Line) – 2.4 km
- Belgachia Metro Station (North–South Line) – 5.7 km
- Dum Dum Metro Station (North–South Line) – 6 km

These stations provide rapid access to commercial hubs, Salt Lake Stadium, Sealdah, Howrah, Park Street, and other major destinations in Kolkata.

Airport Connectivity

The Netaji Subhas Chandra Bose International Airport (CCU) is located approximately 6–7 km from Kestopur via VIP Road, allowing quick and convenient airport access for residents and frequent travelers.

Railway Connectivity

Several major railway stations lie in proximity to Kestopur:

- Ultadanga / Bidhannagar Road Station – 5.2 km
- Kolkata Railway Station (Chitpur) – 6.7 km
- Dum Dum Junction – ≈7 km
- Sealdah Railway Station – 10 km
- Howrah Railway Station – 13 km

These stations provide suburban, long-distance, and intercity train services, ensuring strong rail connectivity.

Salt Lake–Kestopur Bridge

The Salt Lake–Kestopur Bridge, inaugurated on 25 September 2022, connects AK Block, Salt Lake with Kestopur. The 36-metre, two-lane bridge allows direct movement between Salt Lake and VIP Road, significantly reducing travel time and eliminating previous detours via Lake Town Bailey Bridge or New Town. The bridge has improved connectivity for airport-bound commuters, office-goers from Salt Lake Sector I & II, and residents traveling between Baguiati, New Town, and surrounding areas.

Overall Connectivity

Kestopur is one of the most strategically located and accessible neighbourhoods in eastern Kolkata. Its connectivity benefits include:

- A dense network of bus routes linking to major parts of the city
- Two major arterial roads, Kestopur Main Road and Canal Side Road, converging at Mission Bazar
- Metro stations within 2–6 km
- Proximity to key railway stations within 5–13 km
- Direct access to VIP Road
- Efficient airport connectivity
- The Salt Lake–Kestopur Bridge enhancing cross-locality access

This combination of road, rail, and metro infrastructure makes Kestopur a commuter-friendly locality and an important transport hub in the eastern part of the city

== Police station ==
- Newtown PS
- Bidhannagar PS
- Baguiati PS
