= Lake Town, Kolkata =

Neighbourhood in Kolkata, West Bengal, India

Lake Town
- Neighbourhood
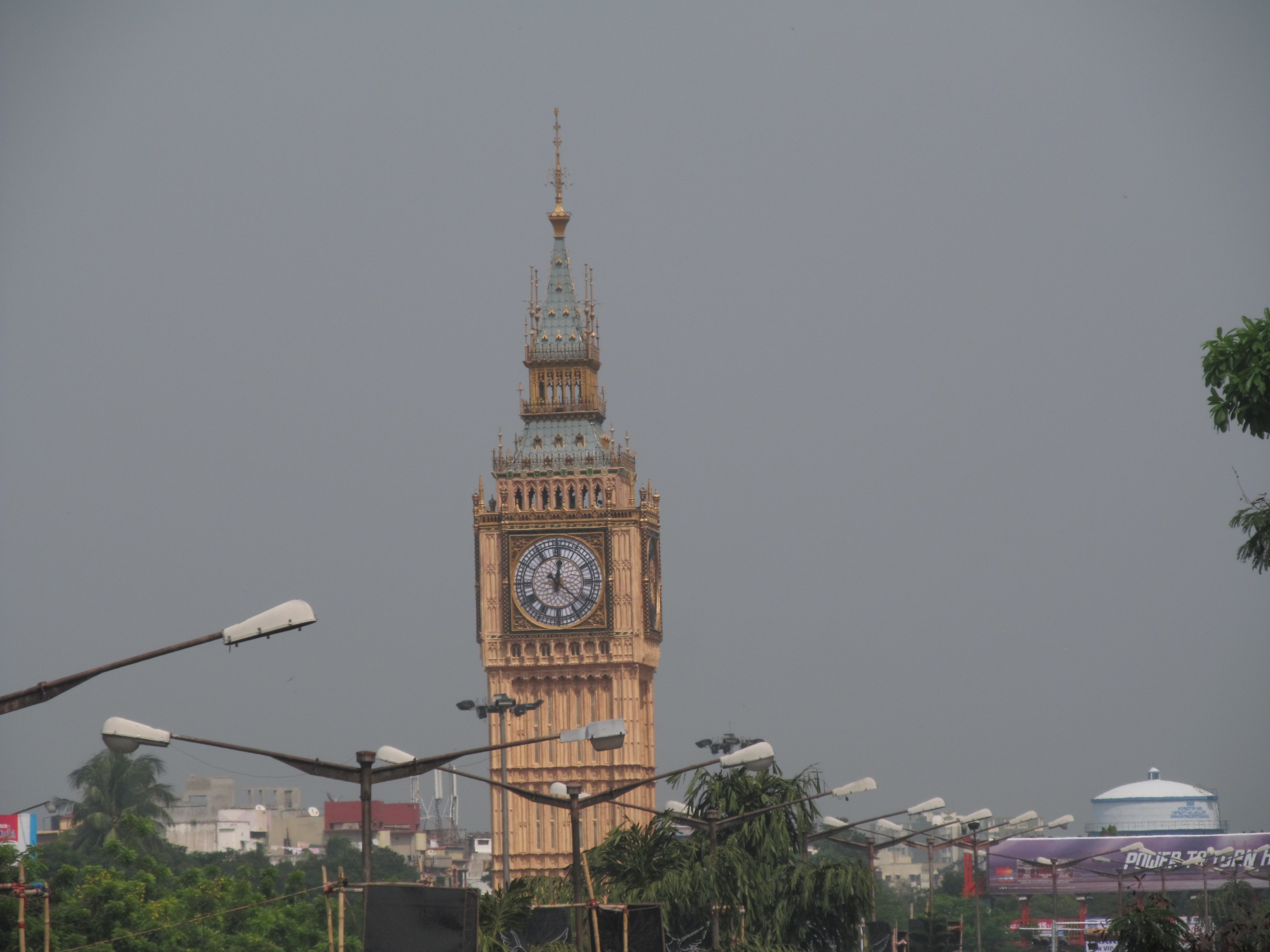
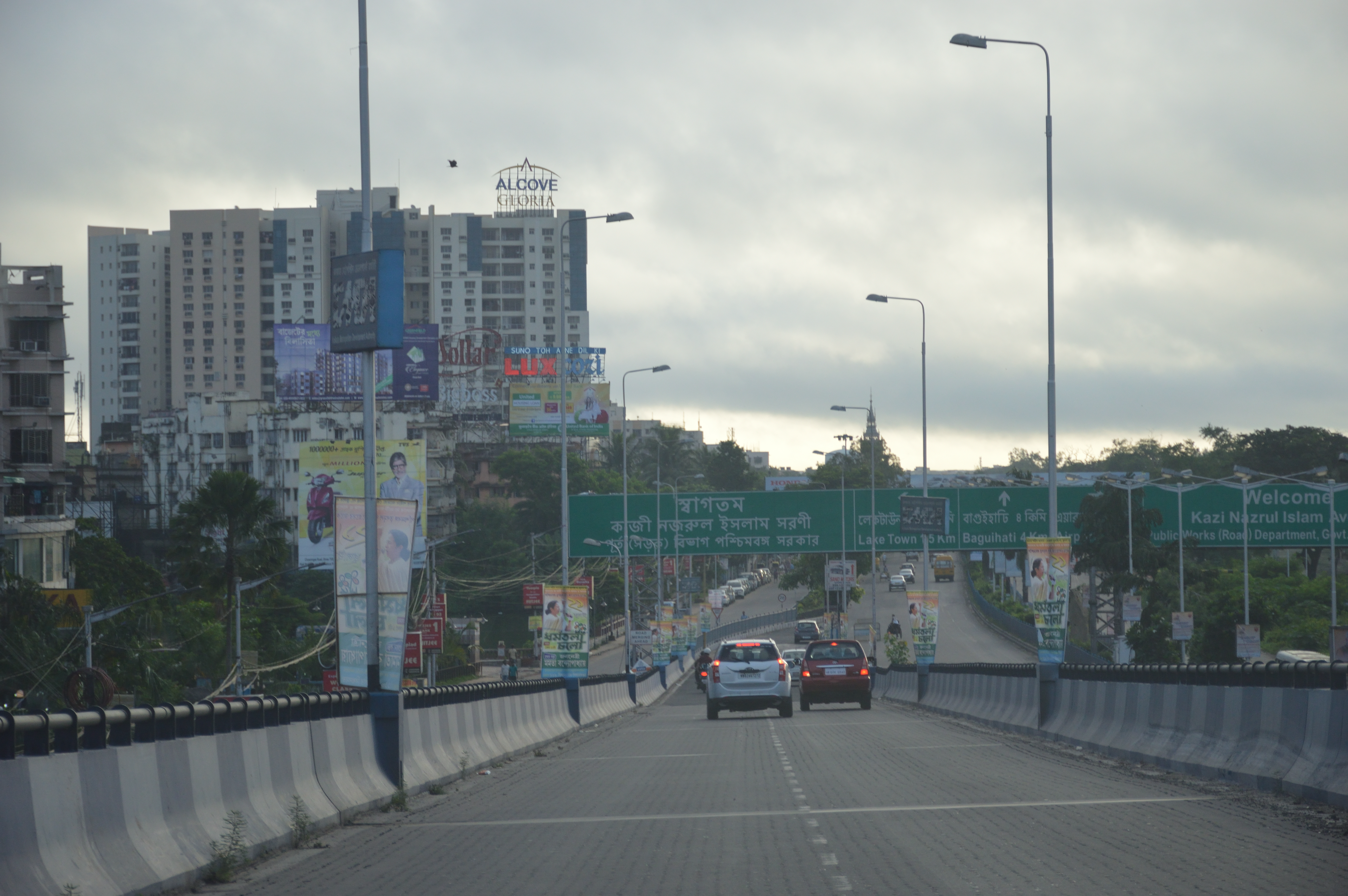
- 1.Kolkata Time Zone Tower; 2.Ultadanga Flyover ending on VIP Road in Dakshindari, Lake Town

- Location in Kolkata Lake Town (West Bengal) Lake Town (India)
- Coordinates: 22°36′18″N 88°24′18″E
- Country: India
- State: West Bengal
- Division: Presidency
- District: North 24 Parganas
- Metro Station: Belgachia; Dum Dum
- Railway Station: Bidhannagar Road; Dum Dum Junction

Government
  - Type: Municipality
  - Body: South Dumdum Municipality

Languages
  - Official: Bengali, English
- Time zone: UTC+5:30 (IST)
- PIN: 700048, 700089
- Telephone code: +91 33
- Vehicle registration: WB
- Vidhan Sabha constituency: Bidhannagar

Lake Town is a locality in South Dumdum of North 24 Parganas district in the Indian state of West Bengal. It is a part of the area covered by Kolkata Metropolitan Development Authority (KMDA).

== Geography ==
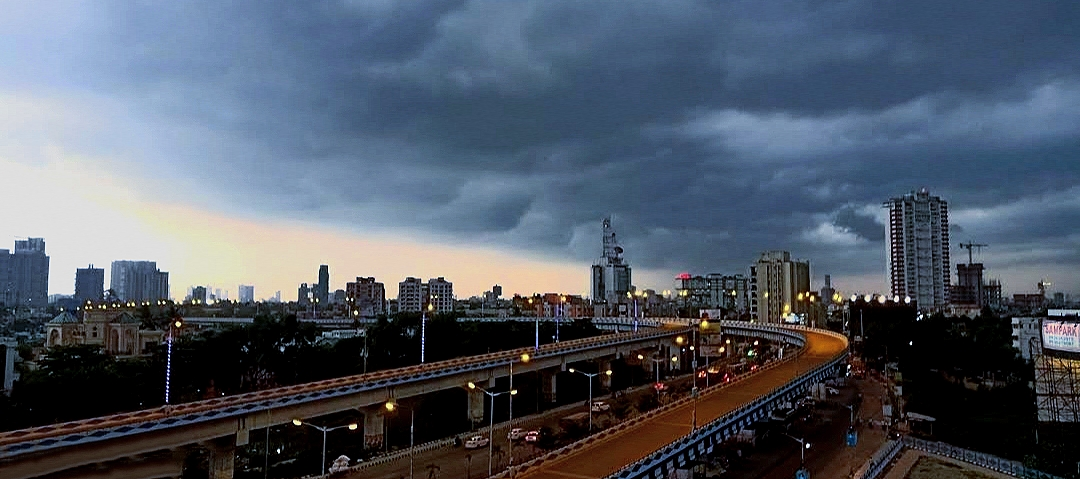
A view from Dakshindari, Lake Town

=== Police station ===
Lake Town police station under Bidhannagar Police Commissionerate has jurisdiction over Lake Town areas.

=== Post office ===
Lake Town has a delivery sub-post office, with PIN 700089 in the Kolkata East Division of North 24 Parganas district in Calcutta region. Another post office with the same PIN is Kalindi Housing Estate.

== Time Zone Tower ==
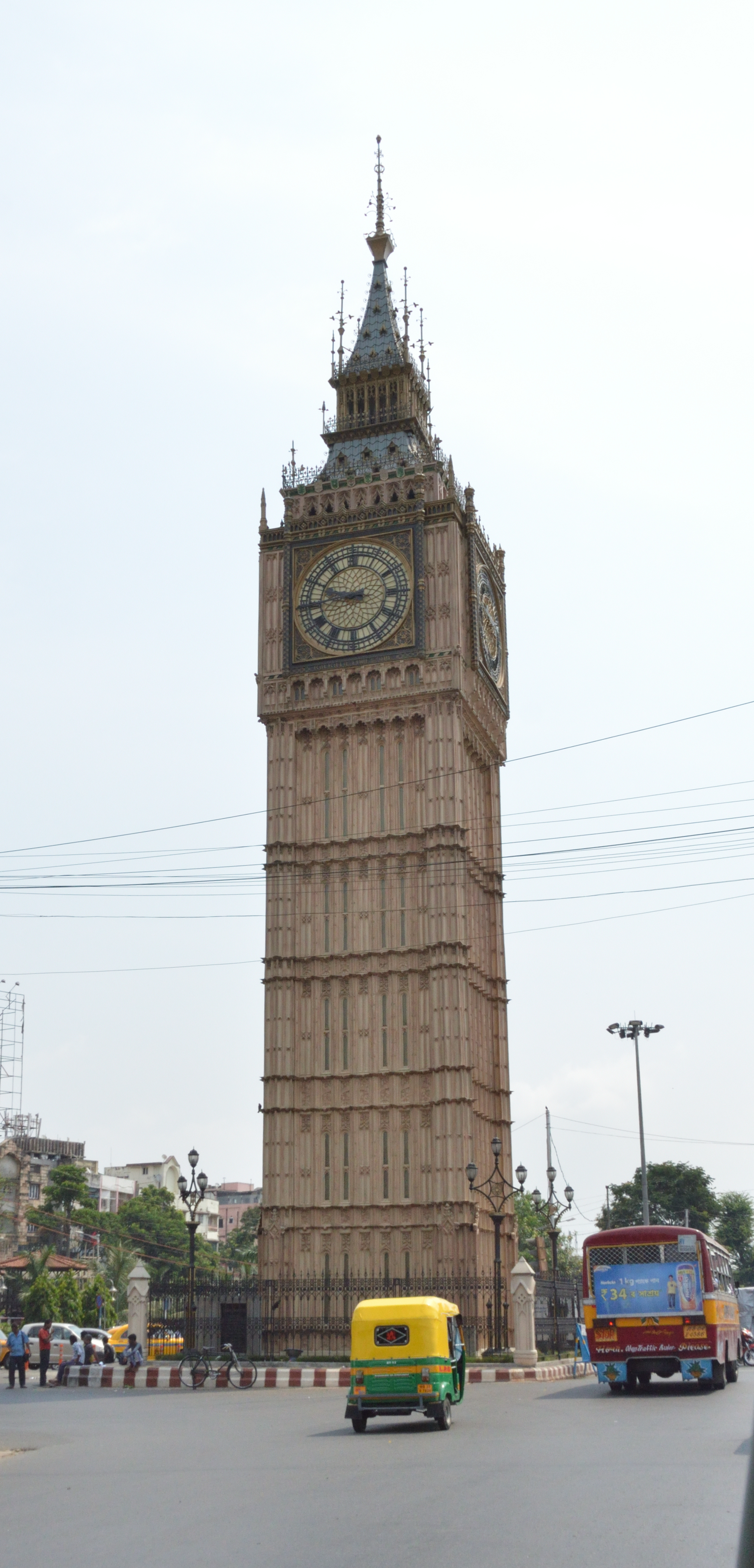
Big Ben Replica, Lake Town

Standing on the VIP Road, the Kolkata Time Zone Tower is a one-third sized replica of Big Ben in Westminster, London. Completed in October 2015, the tower was conceived by Mamata Banerjee, the Chief Minister of West Bengal, with the intention of incorporating London's architecture in Kolkata. The project, headed by the South Dum Dum Municipality, cost Rs 1.36 crores (USD 211997) and was the subject of widespread local opposition, including a door-to-door petition, on the grounds of both cost and of cultural inappropriateness.

The tower is 30 metres in height, while the Big Ben is 96 metres. It has 10 floors and the 4 clock faces, sponsored by the Anglo Swiss Company, each are 3.6 metres in diameter, compared to 7 metres of the original.

== Real estates ==
A planned township with large open spaces, parks and a lake, Lake Town is one of the most sought-after residential areas of Northern fringes of Kolkata. Its proximity to Dumdum/Kolkata Airport and commercial centres like Salt Lake and New Town has been a catalyst for the rising property prices in recent years.

Some of Kolkata's prominent Real Estate firms have their presence in Lake Town.

- Ujaas - The Condoville by Bengal Ambuja
- Avani Oxford Phase I and II by Avani Group
- Alcove Gloria by Alcove Realty, an arm of Diamond Group
- Big Bazaar Family Centre - Kolkata's largest Big Bazaar, is a part of the locality.It became Reliance smartbazaar after takeover of Big Bazaars properties

== Transport ==
Buses ply along Jessore Road, Lake Town Road and VIP Road in Lake Town. There is also Ultadanga Flyover which was inaugurated in 2011. The flyover connects EM Bypass (Bidhan Sishu Udyan, Ultadanga) with VIP Road (Dakshindari, Lake Town) and has reduced traffic jam at "Hudco More" of Ultadanga.

=== Bus routes ===
Several Buses ply on Lake Town Road are as follows:

- AC 30 (Lake Town - Howrah Stn.)
- 47B (Lake Town - Kasba Dhanmath)
- 215/1 (Lake Town - Howrah Stn.)
- 221 (Nagerbazar - Southern Avenue)
- 223 (B.T College - Golf Green)
- 30C (Hatiara - Babughat)
- 211A (Langolpota - Ahiritola More)
- DN-8 (Barasat - Salt Lake Sector V)

Bus route numbers 12C/2, 30C/1, 44, 44/1, 45, 45A, 46, 46B, 79D, 91C, 211, 211B, 215, 217, 217B, 237, D-1A, L238, DN17, S-151 (Mini), S-152 (Mini), S-172 (Mini), S-175 (Mini), S-184 (Mini), D-1A, S64, AC39, VS2, VS1, V1, AC2, AC37, AC37C, AC50A, EB13, C42 etc ply on VIP Road.

Bus route numbers 3C/1, 3C/2, 30D, 219, 227, KB-16, 79B, 93, AC-40, 91, 91A, DN-18 etc ply on Jessore Road.

Bidhannagar Road station, Patipukur station, Kolkata Station and Dum Dum Junction are the nearest railway stations of Lake Town.

The Netaji Subhash Chandra Bose International Airport is at a distance of about 7 kilometres from Lake Town.

== Durga Puja ==
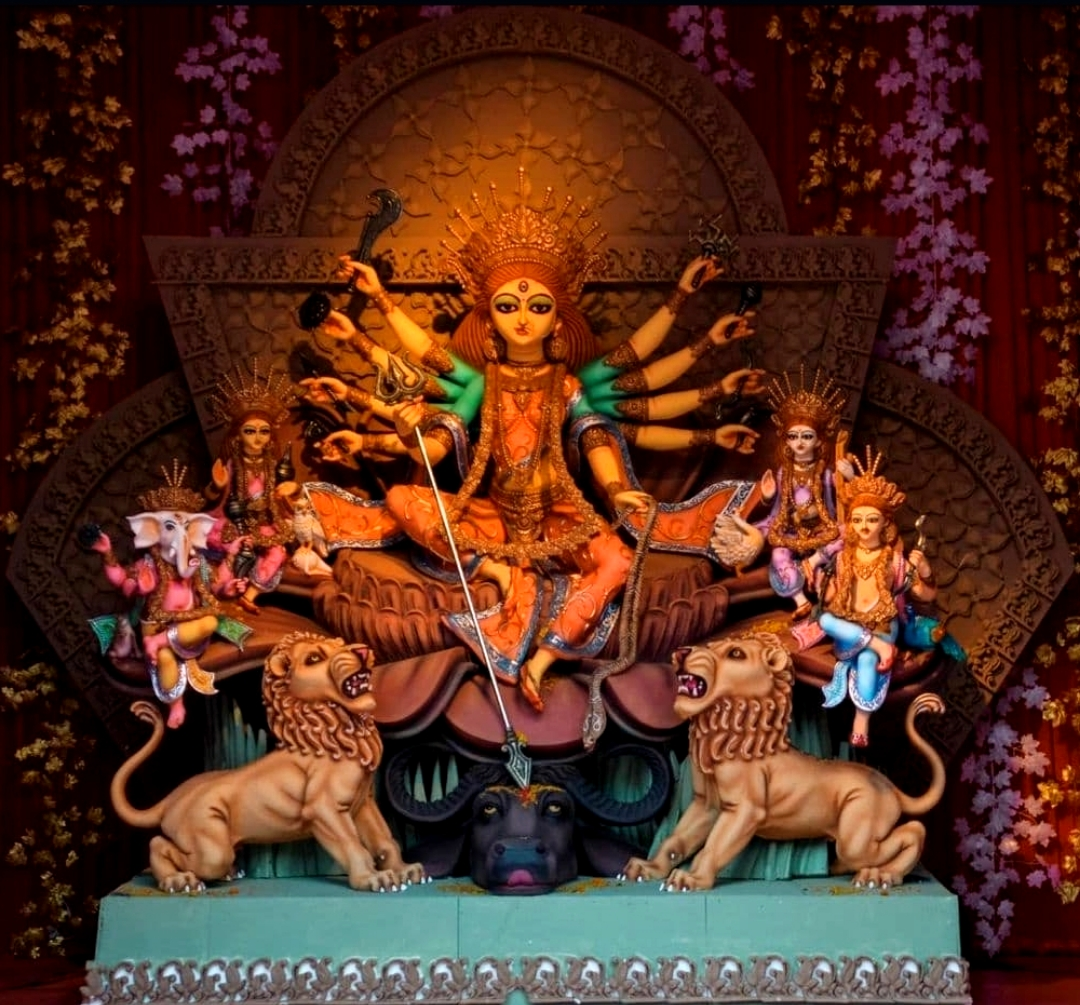
Netaji Sporting Club
Lake Town 2021

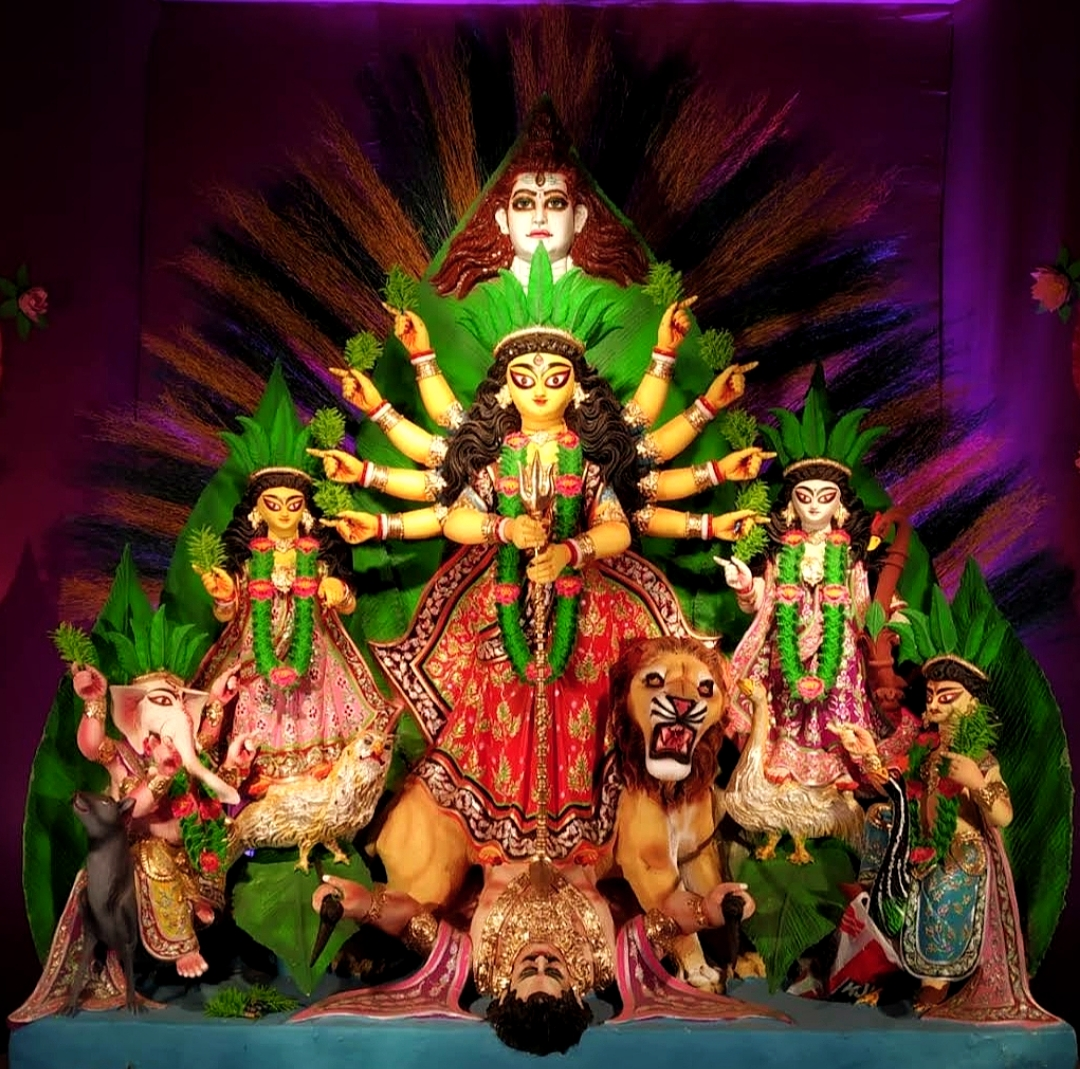
Lake Town Adhibasi Brindo 2020

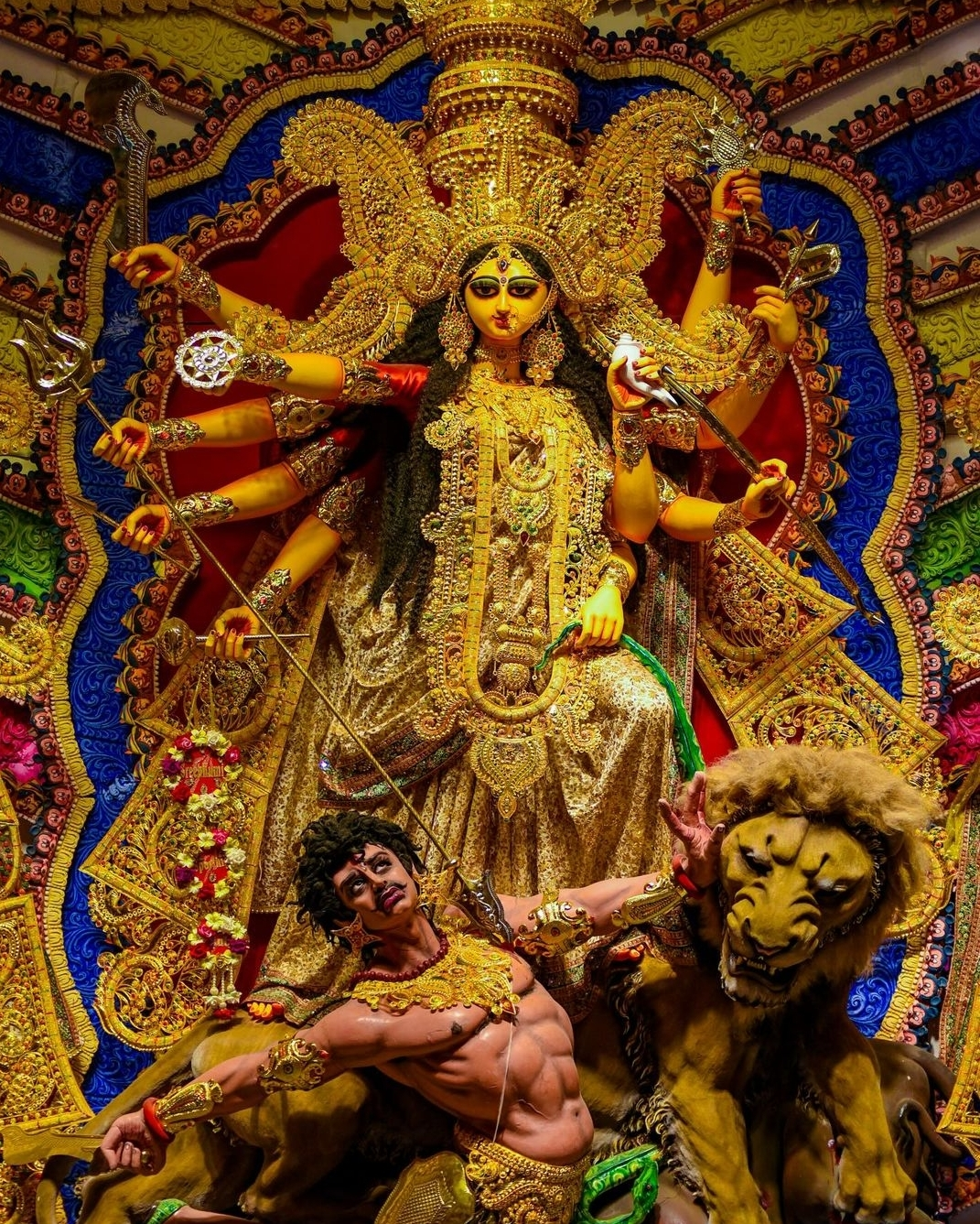
Sreebhumi Sporting Club 2023

In recent years, various organizations in Lake Town like Sreebhumi Sporting Club, Lake Town Adhibasi Brindo, Netaji Sporting Club Lake Town, Golaghata Sammilani and Dakshindari Youth Forum have come into light for their Durga Puja.

== Markets ==
Markets near Lake Town area are:

- Kalindi Vatika Market
- Kalindi Bazar Market
- Barat Bazar Market
- Patipukur Fish Market
- Lake Town Fruits Market
- Annapurna Market

== Notable residents ==
- Shanu Lahiri
- Ram kumar, painter
- Charu Chandra Khan, painter

== Gallery ==
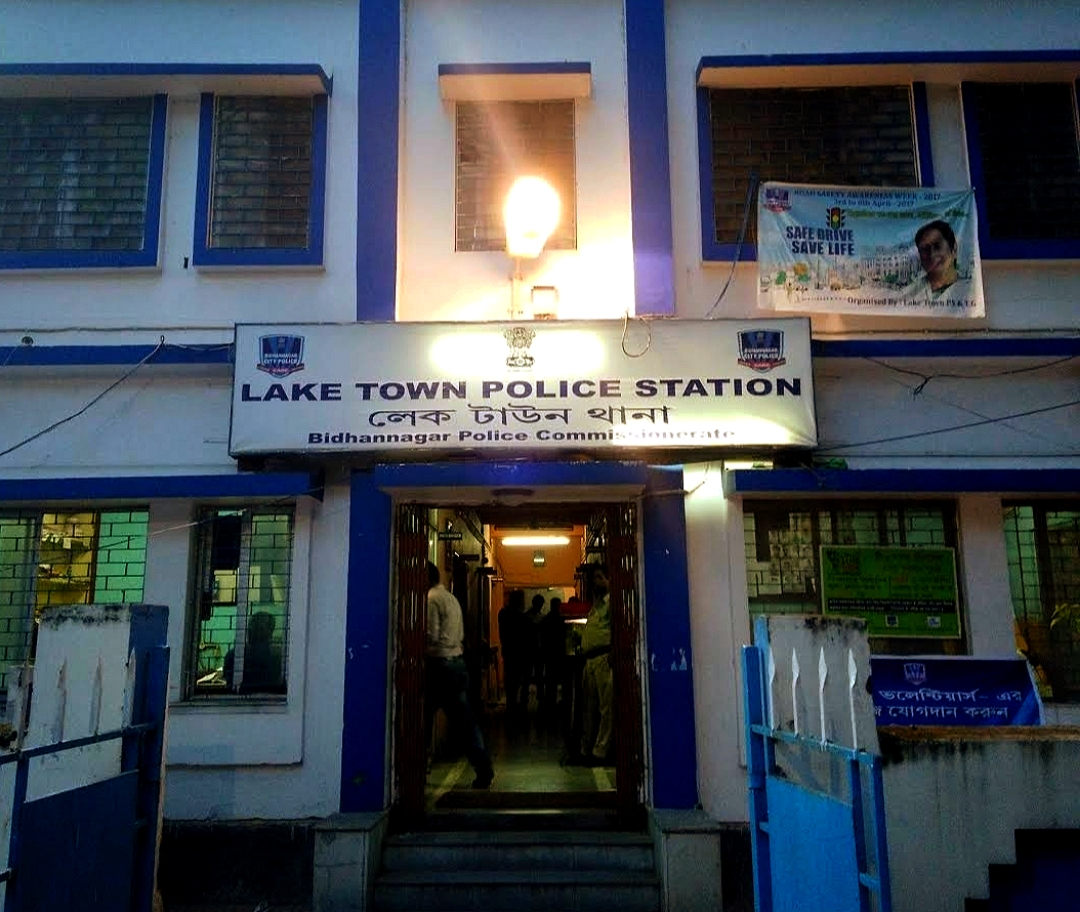
Lake Town police station

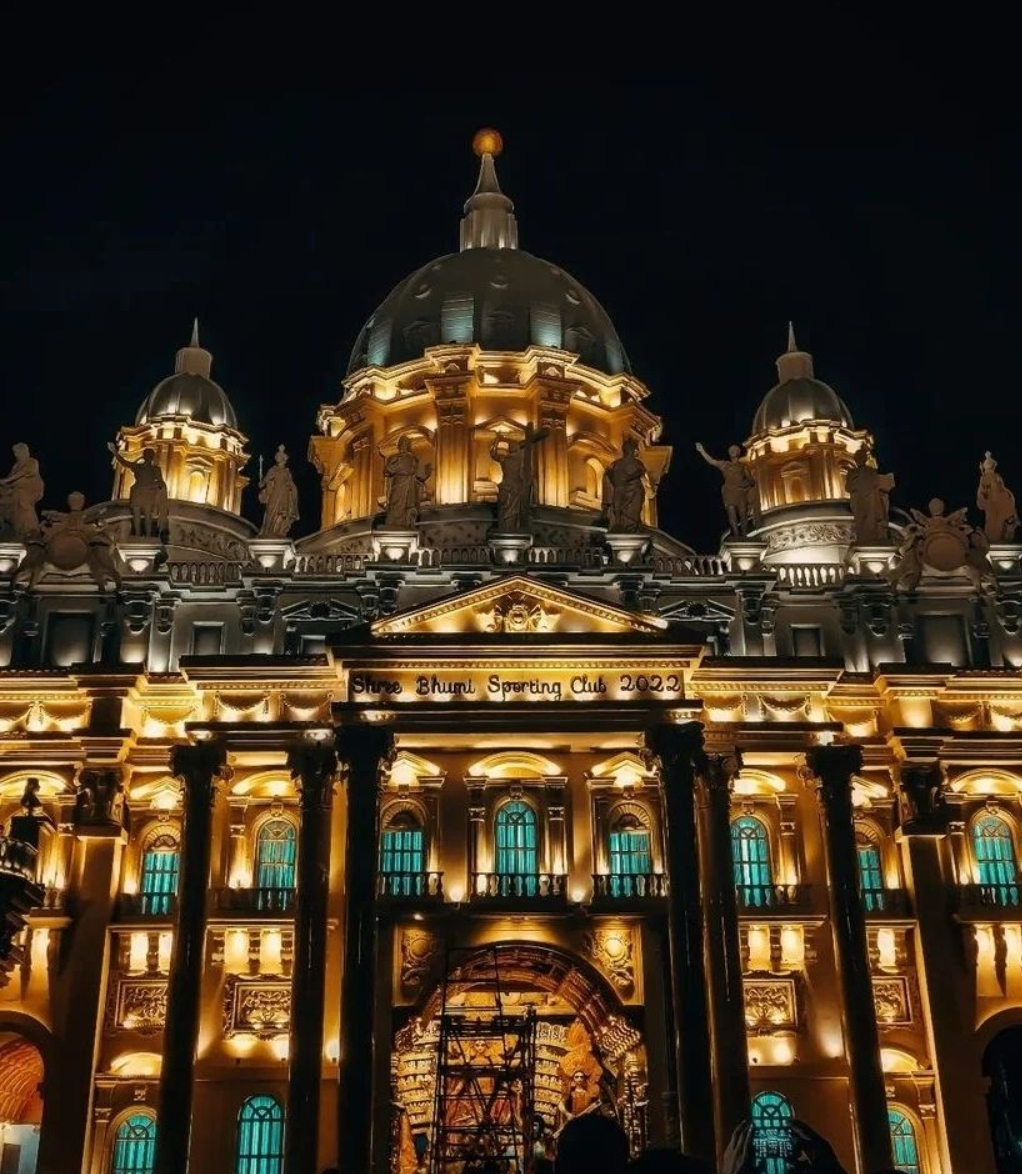
Sreebhumi Sporting Club Durga Puja Theme Pandal 2022 (Vatican City)

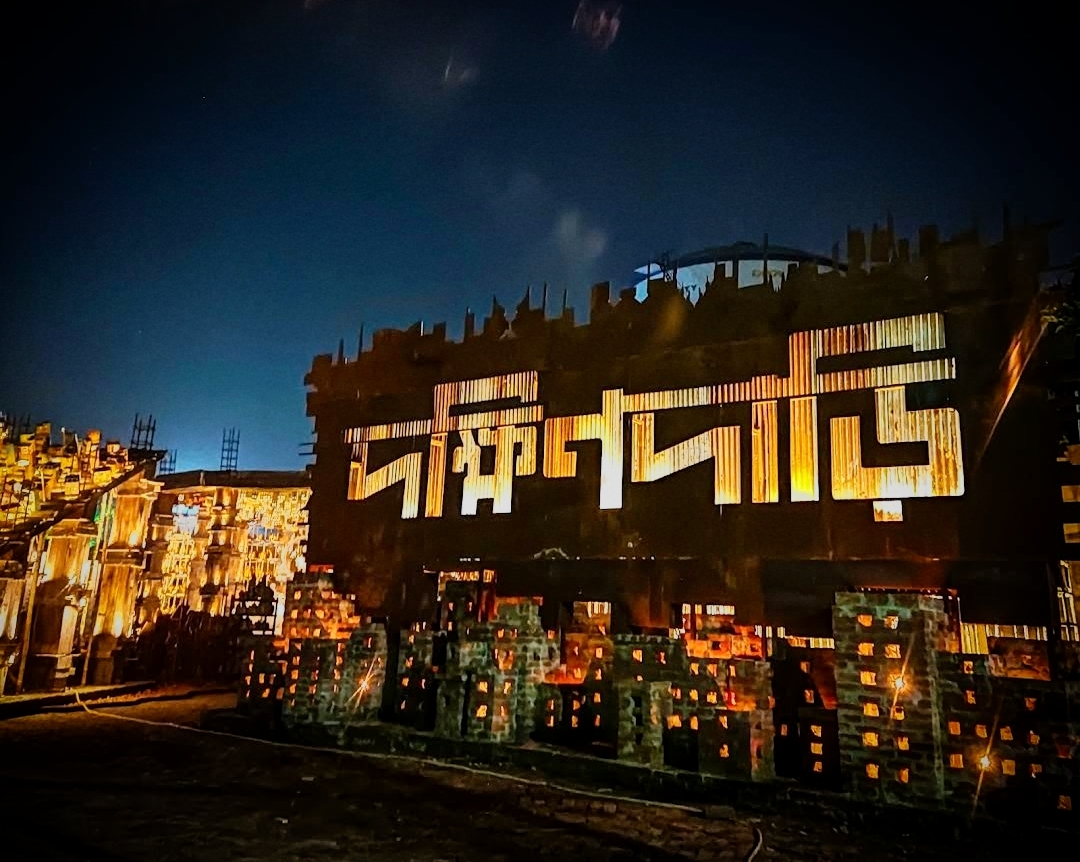
Dakshindari Youth Forum Durga Puja Theme Pandal 2023

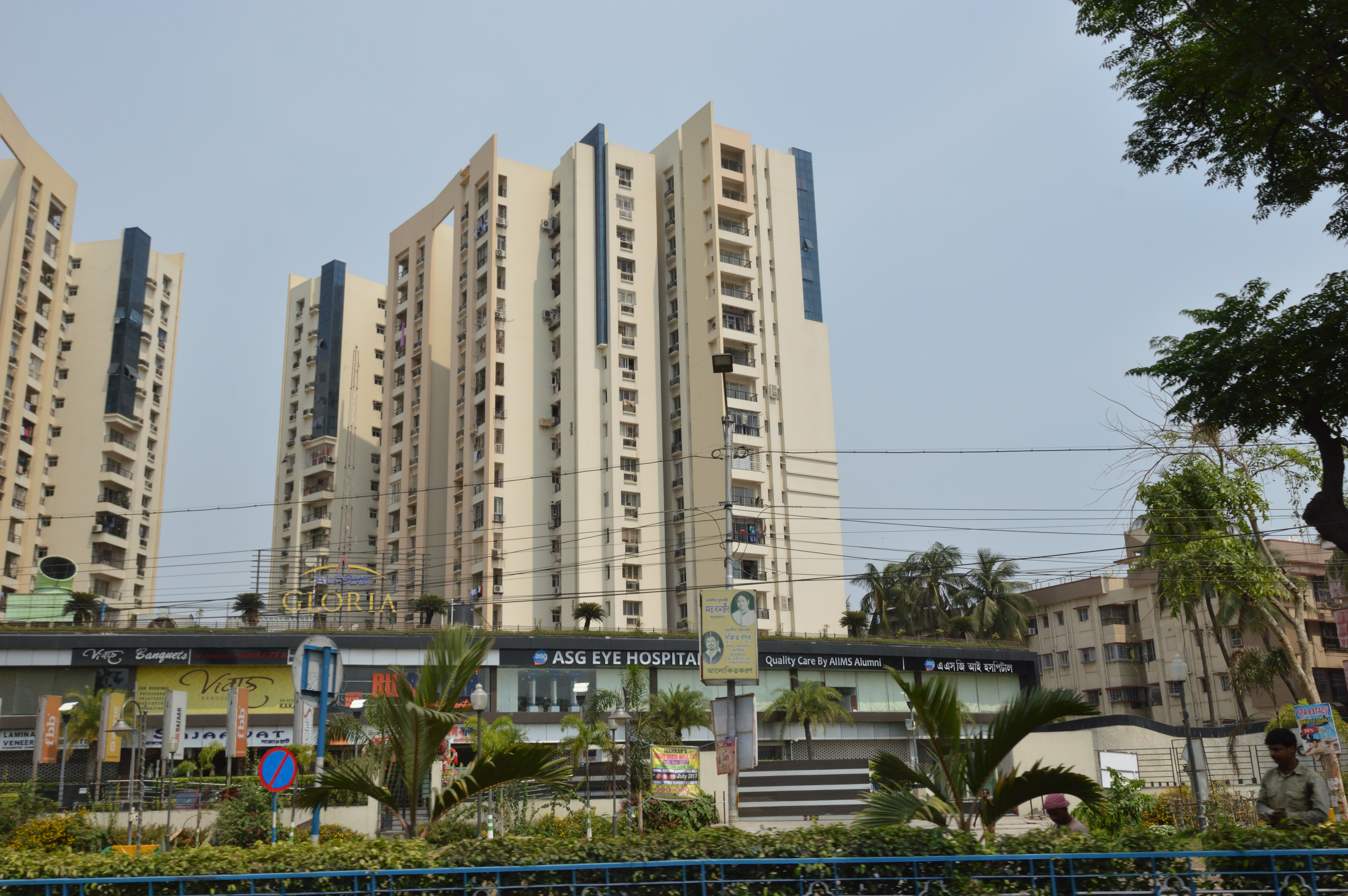
Alcove Gloria (Apartment Complex), VIP Road, Lake Town
