= Bidhannagar Municipal Corporation =

Local civic body in Bidhannagar, West Bengal, India

Type
- Type: Municipal Corporation
- Term limits: 5 years

History
- Founded: 2015; 11 years ago

Leadership
- Mayor: Vacant since 4 June 2026
- Deputy Mayor: Vacant since 4 June 2026
- Chairperson: Vacant since 4 June 2026
- Municipal Commissioner: Ravi Agarwal, IAS

Structure
- Political groups: Dissolved

Elections
- Voting system: First past the post
- Last election: 12 February 2022
- Next election: February 2027

Meeting place
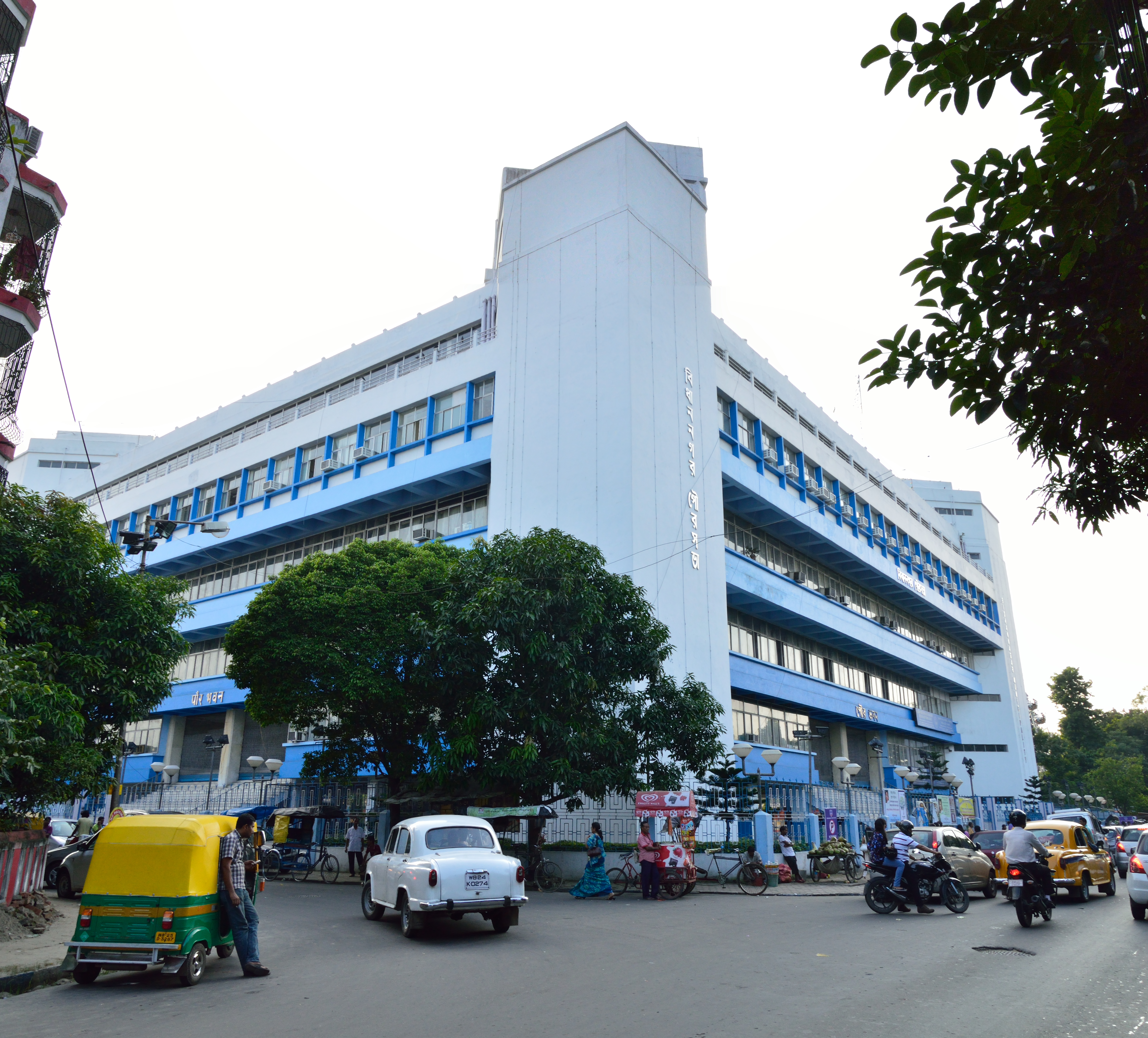
- Headquarters of the Bidhannagar Municipal Corporation

Website
- www.bmcwbgov.in

Bidhannagar Municipal Corporation (BMC) is the local government responsible for the civic infrastructure and administration of Salt Lake and surrounding areas (Rajarhat, Gopalpur, Kestopur, Baguiati, Kaikhali, Teghoria) in Greater Kolkata.

Bidhannagar Municipal Corporation was headed by Administrator Pawan Kadyan, IAS till elections were held in October 2015 after delimitation into 41 wards (Ward No.s 1 to 26 from Rajarhat-Gopalpur Municipality, Ward No. 27 from Mahishbathan II Gram Panchayat and Ward No.s 28 to 44 from Bidhannagar Municipality). This constituted its first Board of Councillors and Mayor-in-Council with Pawan Kadyan, IAS transitioning into the role of Municipal Commissioner. BMC consists of 41 wards (grouped in 6 boroughs). The Corporation is under administrative jurisdiction of Bidhannagar subdivision in the district of North 24 Parganas and police jurisdiction of Bidhannagar City Police.

== Geography ==
This civic administrative body administers an area of 60.5 square kilometres (23.4 sq mi) which is approximately 3.2% of the Total Kolkata Metropolitan Area (KMA). The jurisdiction of BMC includes Salt Lake (a planned satellite town of Kolkata and previously under "Bidhannagar Municipality"), Mahishbathan II Gram Panchayat (which consisted of Tarulia, Mahisgote and Thakdari) and Rajarhat (previously under "Rajarhat-Gopalpur Municipality" which consisted of Kestopur, Chandiberia, Baguiati, Udayan Pally, Santosh Pally, Jagatpur, Ashwini Nagar, Narayantala, Raghunathpur, Arjunpur, Teghoria, Jyangra, Helabottala, Noapara, Adarsha Pally, Pramodgarh, Jyoti Nagar, Hatiara, Kaikhali, Chinar Park, Atghara, Dasadrone, Salua, Bablatala, Narayanpur, Beraberi, Bidisha Pally, Sarada Pally, Ganti and part of NSCBI Airport).

Bidhannagar Municipal Corporation borders Madhyamgram Municipality in the north, Rajarhat block in the south, New Town in the east and South Dum Dum in the west

== Administration ==
Bidhannagar Municipal Corporation is divided into 41 wards. The 41 wards are arranged into 6 boroughs. Each ward elects a councillor. The mayor is responsible for the overall functioning of the BMC and has a tenure of five years. At present, the no one holds the power in the BMC.

== Budget ==
As of 2020, the budget of the city government is fund surplus with a budget of ₹424.8 crore (US$44 million) while its total revenue stands at ₹425 crore (US$44 million). A lot of funds were allocated for disaster management and covid relief while an allocation of ₹150 crore (US$16 million) was made for a road repairing scheme to have the transport infrastructure upgraded.

== Demographics ==
As per 2011 census, total population under Bidhannagar Municipal Corporation is 632,107. Total number of Scheduled Castes and Scheduled Tribes are 121,761 and 10,950 respectively. Among the 41 wards, Wards no 20 has the highest population with 20,981 residents while ward no 23 has the lowest population with 11,639 residents. Total number of households in BMC is 153,661.

== List of mayors ==
No.	Name	Term		Ward	Party
No.	Name	Start	End	Ward	Party
1	Sabyasachi Dutta	2015	2019	Ward No. 31	Trinamool Congress
2	Krishna Chakraborty	2019	2026	Ward No. 29	Trinamool Congress

== Current members ==
Bidhannagar Municipal Corporation has a total of 41 members or councillors, who are directly elected after a term of 5 years. The council is led by the Mayor. The latest elections were held in 12 February 2022. The Corporation was dissolved after the Mayor, Krishna Chakraborty of the Trinamool Congress resigned on 4 June 2026.

Mayor: Vacant
Deputy Mayor: Vacant
Ward No.	Name of Councillor	Party	Remarks
1			
2			
3			
4			
5			
6			
7			
8			
9			
10			
11			
12			
13			
14			
15			
16			
17			
18			
19			
20			
21			
22			
23			
24			
25			
26			
27			
28			
29			
30			
31			
32			
33			
34			
35			
36			
37			
38			
39			
40			
41			
