= Teghoria =

- Neighbourhood
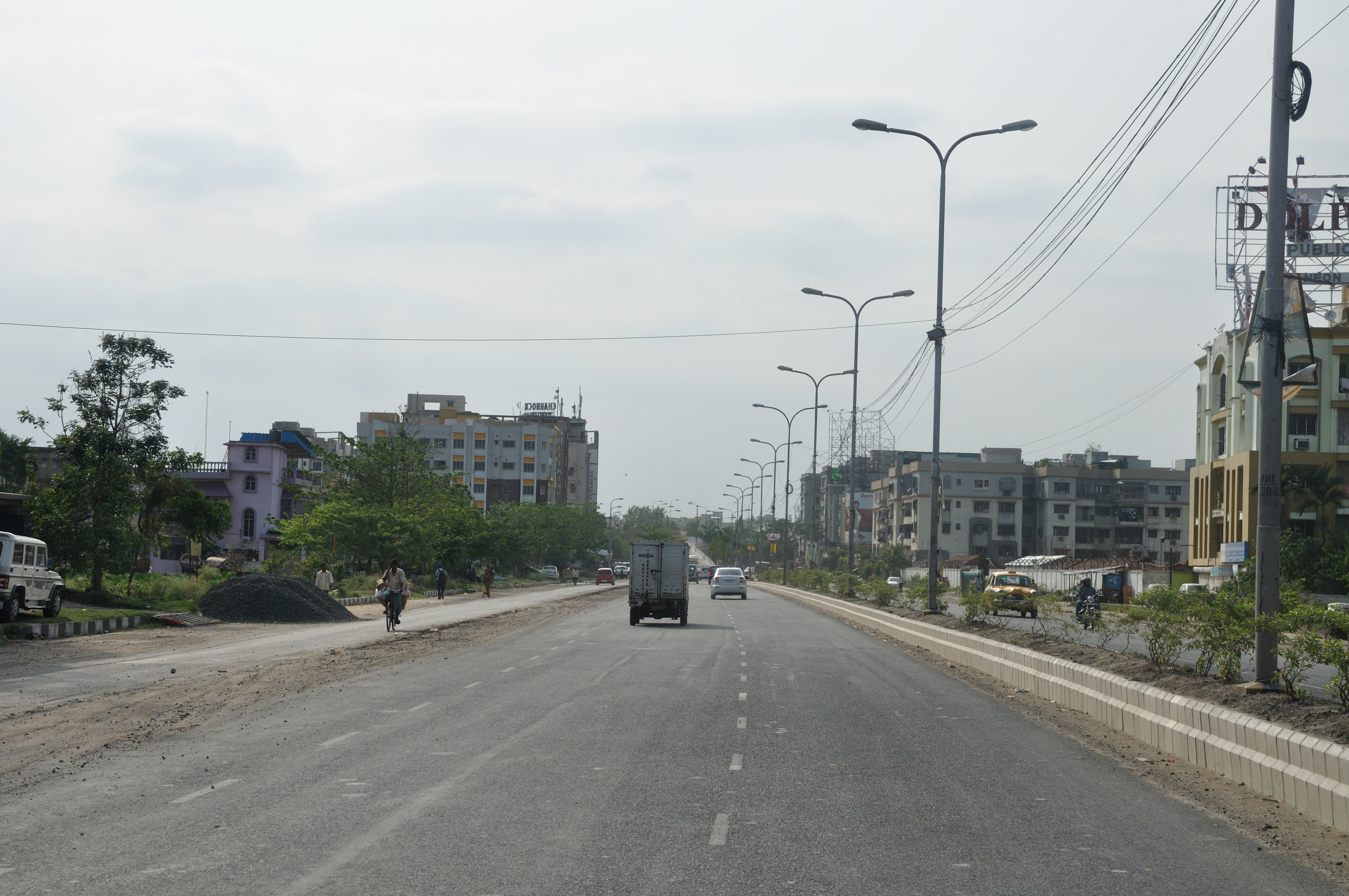
- Major Arterial Road, Teghoria–Rajarhat

- Location in West Bengal, India Teghoria (West Bengal) Teghoria (India)
- Coordinates: 22.6227°N 88.4368°E
- Country: India
- State: West Bengal
- Division: Presidency
- District: North 24 Parganas
- Metro station: VIP Road (under construction)

Government
  - Type: Municipal Corporation
  - Body: Bidhannagar Municipal Corporation

Languages
  - Official: Bengali, English
- Time zone: UTC+5:30 (IST)
- PIN: 700136, 700157
- Telephone code: +91 33
- Vehicle registration: WB
- BMC wards: 6, 9, 11
- Lok Sabha constituency: Dum Dum
- Vidhan Sabha constituency: Rajarhat Gopalpur
- Website: bmcwbgov.in

Teghoria is a neighbourhood in Bidhannagar Municipal Corporation of North 24 Parganas district in the Indian state of West Bengal. It is a part of the area covered by Kolkata Metropolitan Development Authority (KMDA).

== Geography ==
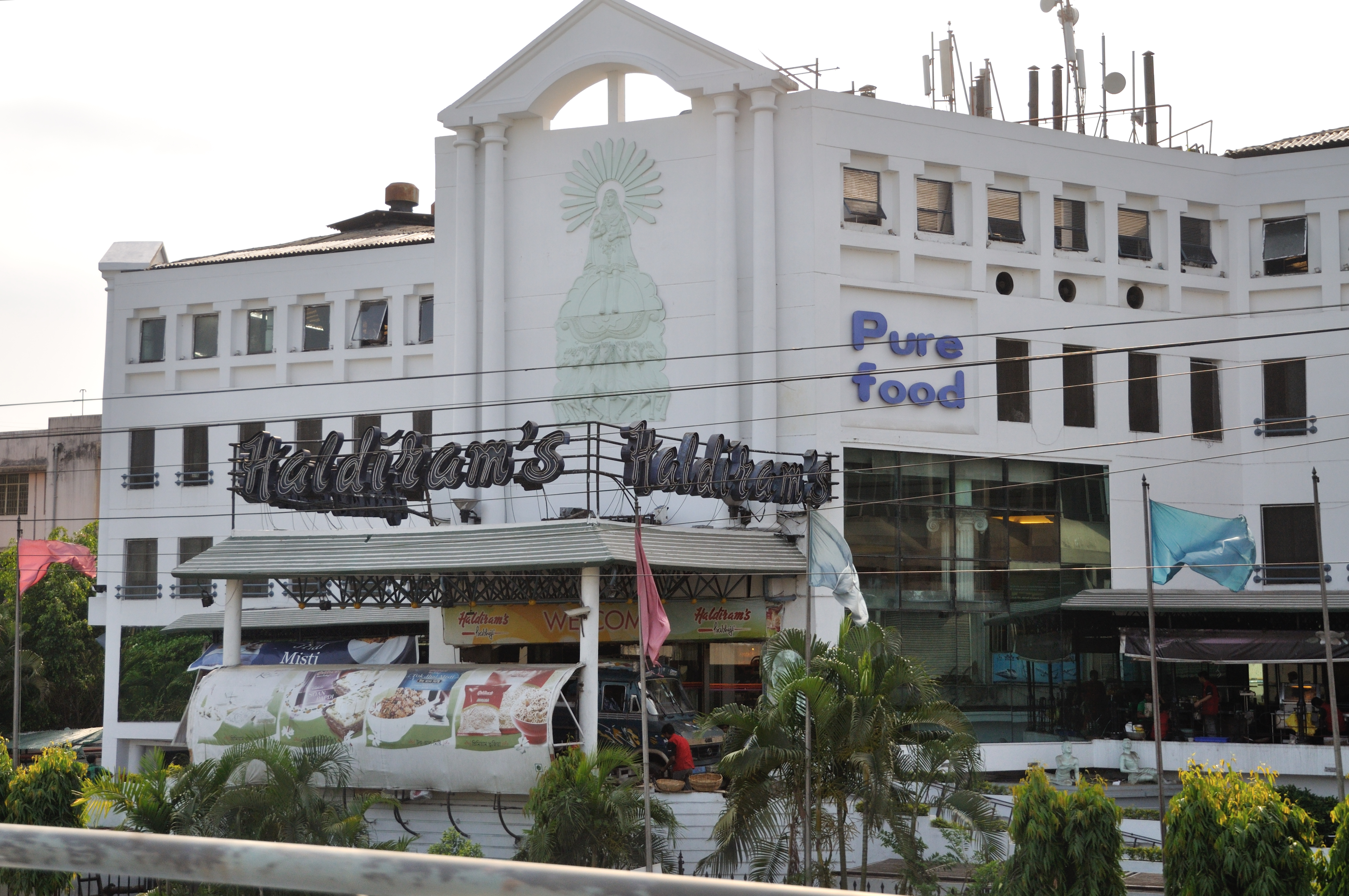
Haldiram Bhujiawala Pure Foods, Teghoria

== Transport ==
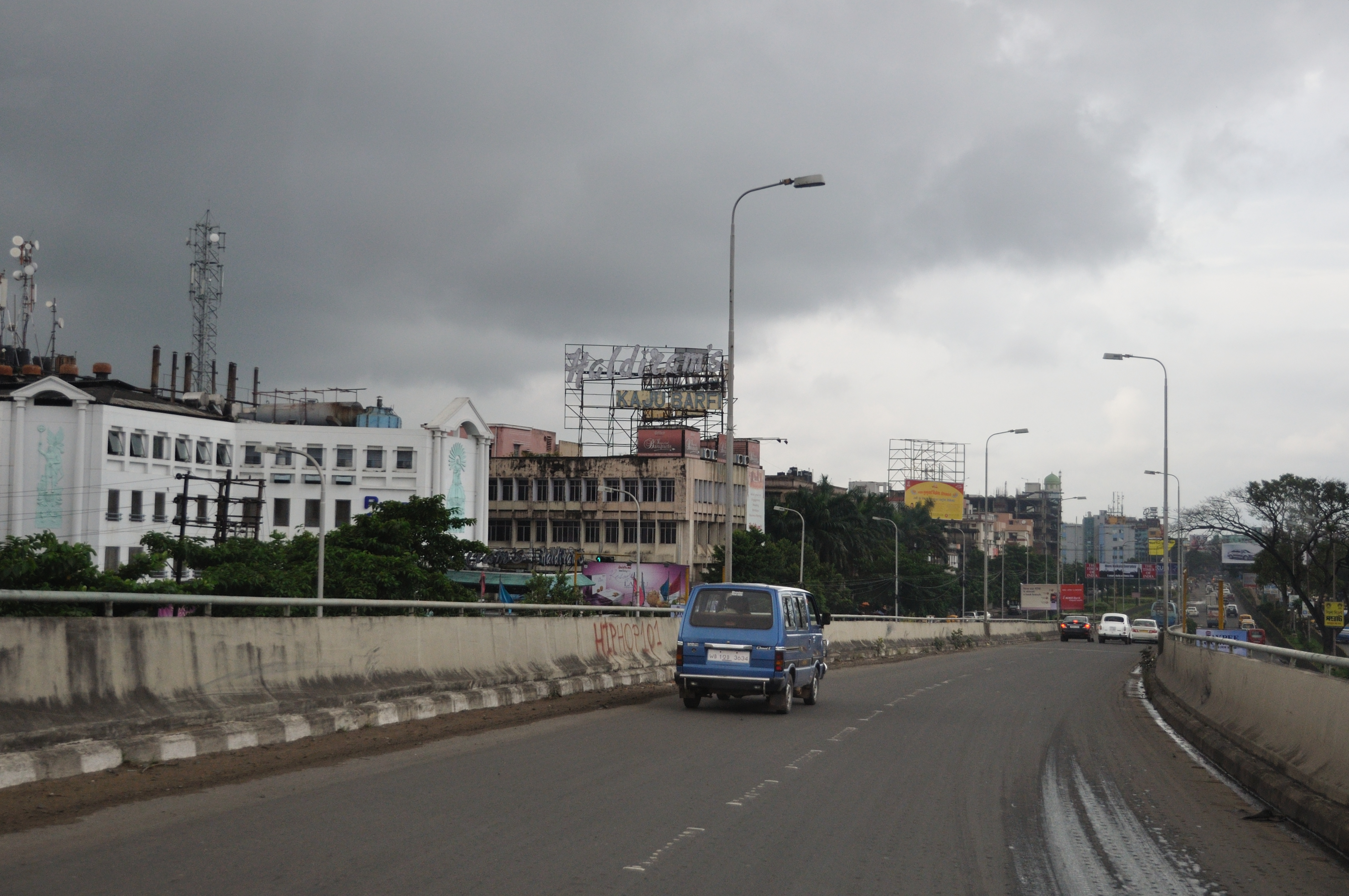
Haldiram Flyover at the intersection of VIP Road and Major Arterial Road

Teghoria is the junction of VIP Road and Major Arterial Road (Haldiram crossing). Teghoria Main Road connects VIP Road to Rajarhat Main Road. Rajarhat Main Road starts from Jora Mandir (near Baguiati) and goes via Loknath Mandir, Chinar Park (crossing with 8-lane roadways Major Arterial Road) to Rajarhat Chowmatha.

Bus route numbers 45, 45A, 46, L238, D-1A, AC-39, VS-2, VS-1, V-1, AC-2, AC-37, AC-50A, AC-23A, AC-37A, AC-38, AC-43, EB-12, EB-13, S-23A, S64, C-23, C-8, 79D, 91C, 237, DN17, S-151 (Mini), S-152 (Mini), S-172 (Mini), S-175 (Mini), S-184 (Mini), 211, 211A, 211B, 215, 217, 46B, 217B etc serves the area.
