= Bangur Avenue =

- Neighbourhood
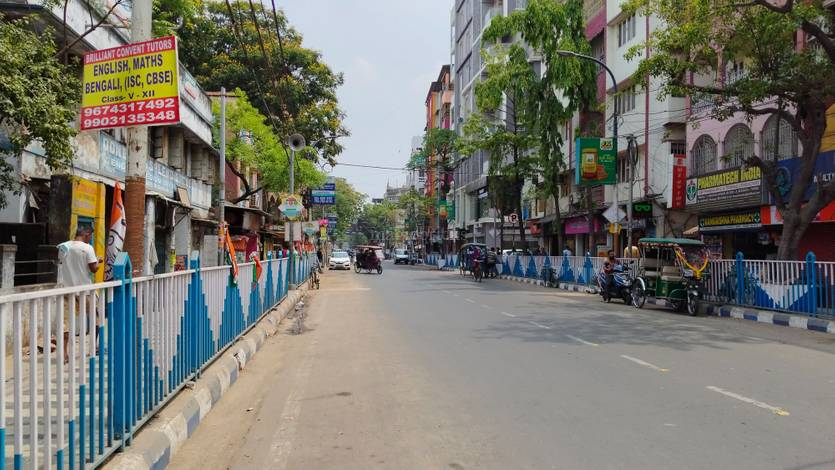
- Bangur Avenue

- Location in West Bengal, India Bangur Avenue (West Bengal) Bangur Avenue (India)
- Coordinates: 22°36′17″N 88°24′58″E
- Country: India
- State: West Bengal
- Division: Presidency
- District: North 24 Parganas
- Metro Station: Belgachia
- Railway Station: Bidhannagar Road

Government
  - Type: Municipality
  - Body: South Dumdum Municipality

Languages
  - Official: Bengali, English
- Time zone: UTC+5:30 (IST)
- PIN: 700055
- Telephone code: +91 33
- Vehicle registration: WB
- Vidhan Sabha constituency: Bidhannagar

Bangur Avenue is a neighbourhood in South Dumdum of North 24 Parganas district in the Indian state of West Bengal. It is a part of the area covered by Kolkata Metropolitan Development Authority (KMDA).

== Geography ==
=== Police station ===
Lake Town police station under Bidhannagar Police Commissionerate has jurisdiction over Bangur areas.

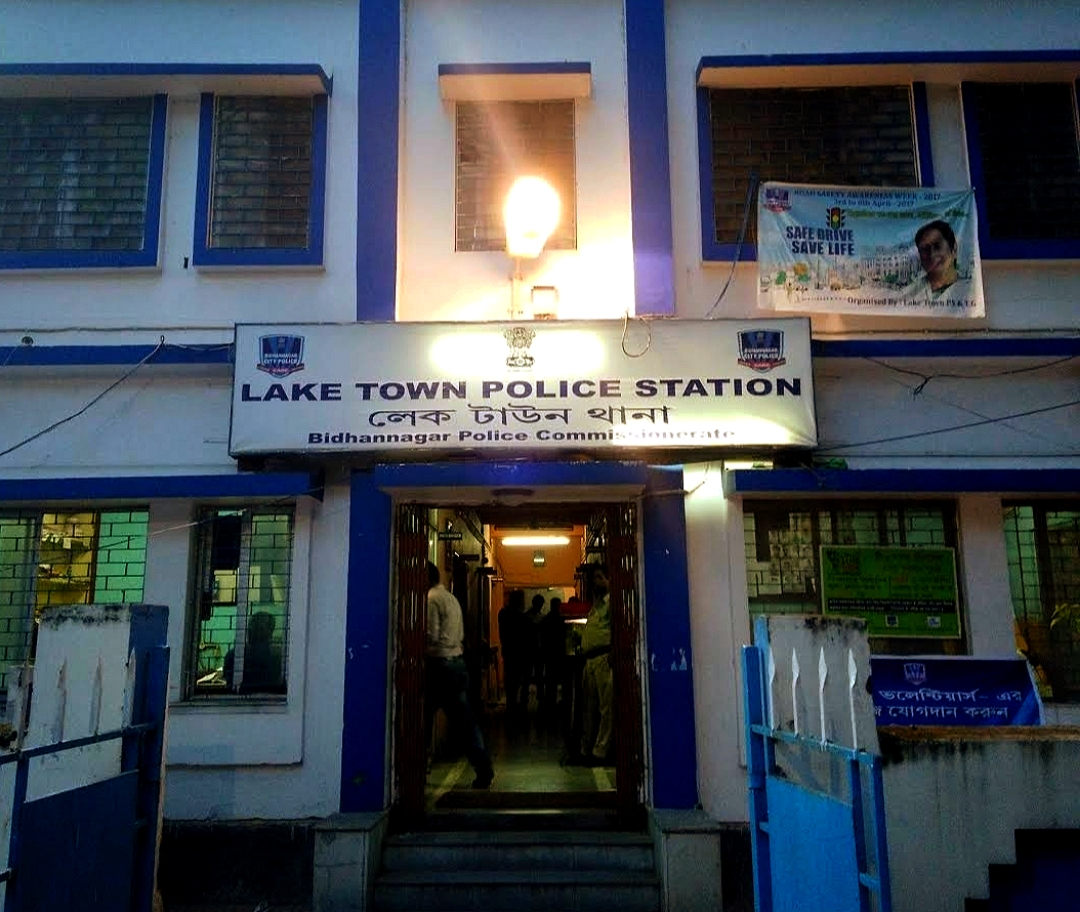
Lake Town police station

=== Post office ===
Bangur Avenue has a non-delivery sub post office, with PIN 700055 in the Kolkata East Division of North 24 Parganas district in Calcutta region. Other post offices with the same PIN are Dum Dum Park and Shyamnagar.

== Transport ==
Jessore Road and VIP Road run along the north boundary and the south boundary of Bangur Avenue respectively. Many buses ply along the two roads.

=== Bus routes ===
- 227 (Bangur Avenue - B.N.R)
- KB-16 (Bangur Avenue - Shapoorji)

Bidhannagar Road railway station, Patipukur railway station, Kolkata Station and Dum Dum Junction are the railway stations close to Bangur Avenue.

The Netaji Subhash Chandra Bose International Airport is at a distance of about 6 kilometres from Bangur Avenue.

== Markets ==
Markets near Bangur area are:

- Barat Bazar Market
- Annapurna Market
- Lake Town Fruits Market
- Kalindi Vatika Market
- Kalindi Bazar Market
