= Baguiati =

Neighbourhood of Kolkata, India

- Neighbourhood
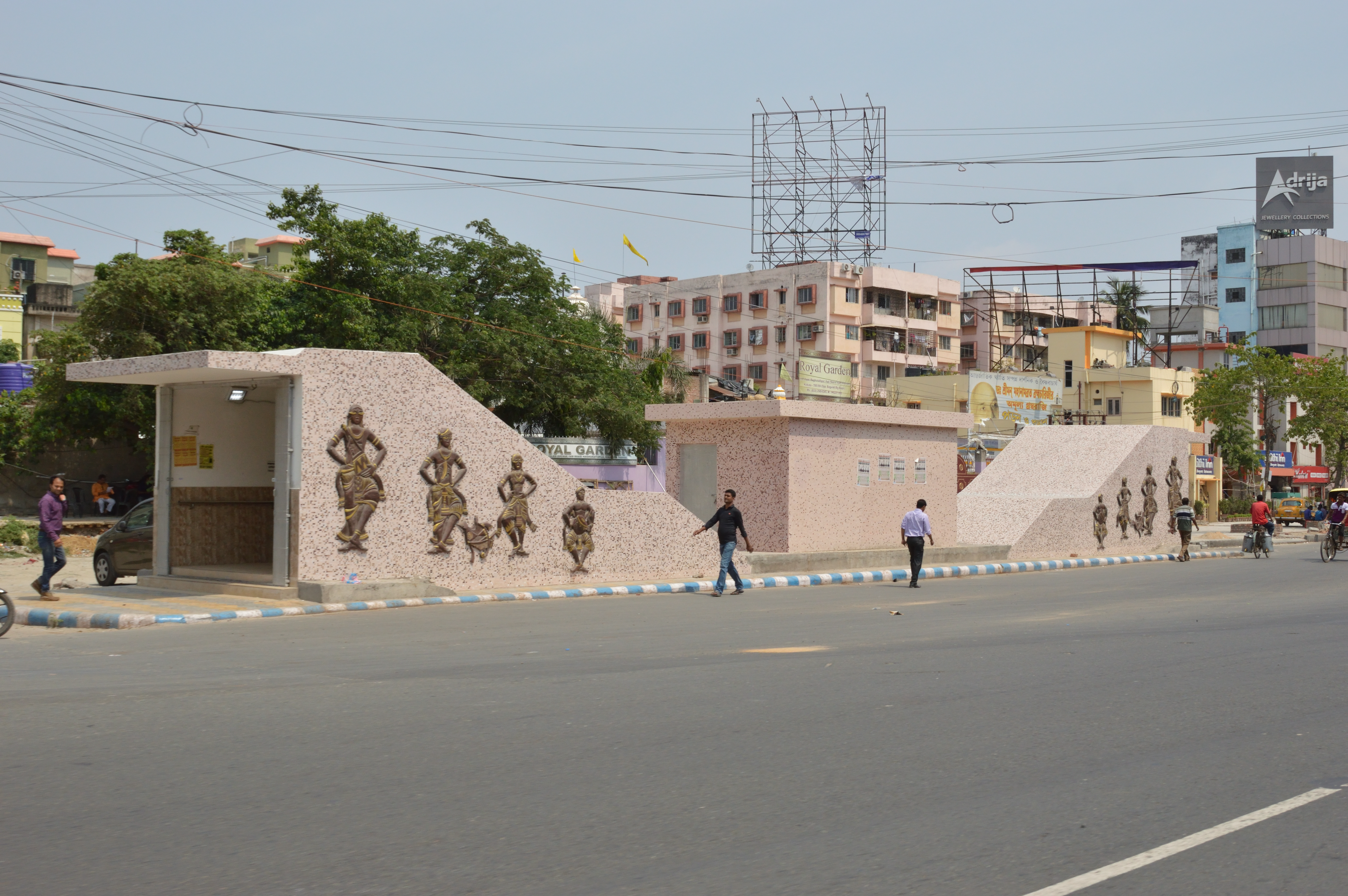
- VIP Road at Raghunathpur, Baguiati

- Location in West Bengal, India Baguiati (West Bengal) Baguiati (India)
- Coordinates: 22.6168°N 88.4275°E
- Country: India
- State: West Bengal
- Division: Presidency
- District: North 24 Parganas
- Metro Station: Belgachia

Government
  - Type: Municipal Corporation
  - Body: Bidhannagar Municipal Corporation

Languages
  - Official: Bengali, English
- Time zone: UTC+5:30 (IST)
- PIN: 700059, 700159
- Telephone code: +91 33
- Vehicle registration: WB
- BMC wards: 8, 9, 10, 11, 15, 16, 17, 18, 19
- Lok Sabha constituency: Dum Dum
- Vidhan Sabha constituency: Rajarhat Gopalpur
- Website: bmcwbgov.in

Baguiati is a neighbourhood in Bidhannagar Municipal Corporation of North 24 Parganas district in the Indian state of West Bengal. It is a part of the area covered by Kolkata Metropolitan Development Authority (KMDA).

== Geography ==
Sub localities within Baguiati area include Deshbandhu Nagar, Ashwini Nagar, Jyangra, Raghunathpur, Arjunpur and adjacent areas. There are 2 main Post offices covering this area, one on the western half of VIP road (Deshbandhunagar), the other one on the eastern half of VIP Road (Aswininagar) which has been newly established. It also has a dedicated police station under the jurisdiction of the Bidhannagar City Police.

The flyover from Dum Dum Park to Raghunathpur above VIP Road was opened in March 2015 to keep the traffic congestion away from Baguiati, and provide a smoother flow to the Airport.

=== Infrastructure ===
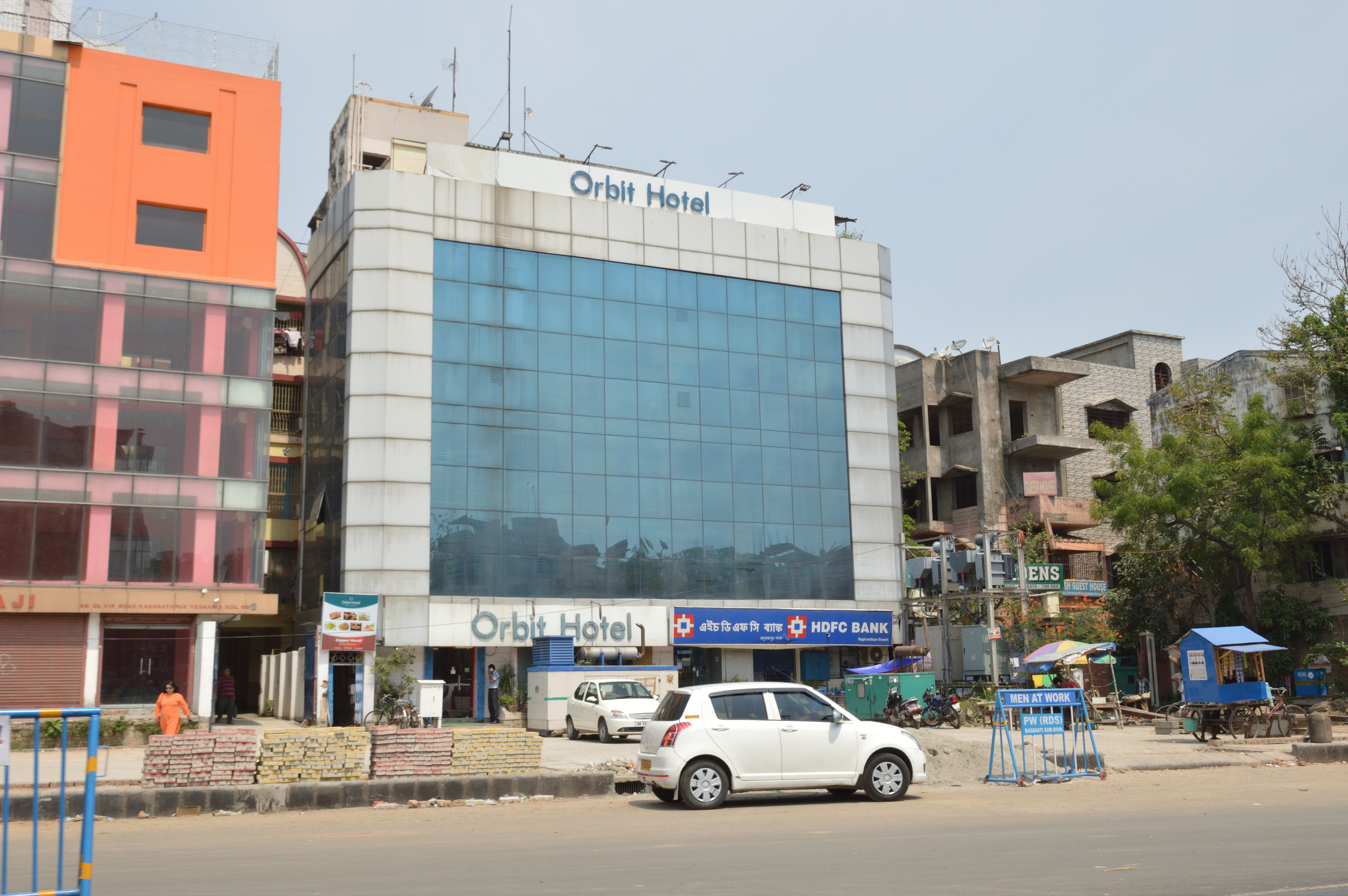
Orbit Hotel, VIP Road at Raghunathpur, Baguiati

A huge number of small enterprises exist in this region. These enterprises primarily deal with the import and export of small articles like jute, electronics, watch manufacturing, polyware manufacturing, medical equipment supplies etc. The area is a hub for shopping in the North Kolkata area, with The bazaar being quite famous. The township has a number of educational institutes, hotels and health care institutes. Baguiati Bazar and Baguiati VIP Super Market are well known as prominent locations for shopping.

=== Retail stores ===
Baguiati is the first location in Kolkata and West Bengal to witness the opening of Big Bazaar, one of the leading retail chains of India. It is located at Parvati Vihar, Raghunathpur and is one of the oldest departmental store of its kind in Kolkata.

== Transport ==
A large number of buses ply on VIP Road.

WBTC Bus

- AC 39 (Airport - Howrah Stn)
- VS 2 (Airport - Howrah Stn)
- V 1 (Airport - Tollygunge)
- AC 37C (Airport - Garia)
- AC 37 (Barasat - Garia)
- AC 50A (Garia - Rajchandrapur)
- AC 2 (Barasat - Howrah Stn)
- EB-13 (Hatisala - Howrah Stn)
- S 64 (Naihati - Newtown)

Private Bus

Bus route numbers 12C/2, 30C, 30C/1, 44, 44/1, 45, 45A, 46, 46B, 79D, 91C, 237, D-1A, L238, DN17, S-151 (Mini), S-152 (Mini), S-172 (Mini), S-175 (Mini), S-184 (Mini), 211, 211A, 211B, 215, 217, 217B etc serve the area.
