= Jawpur =

- Neighbourhood
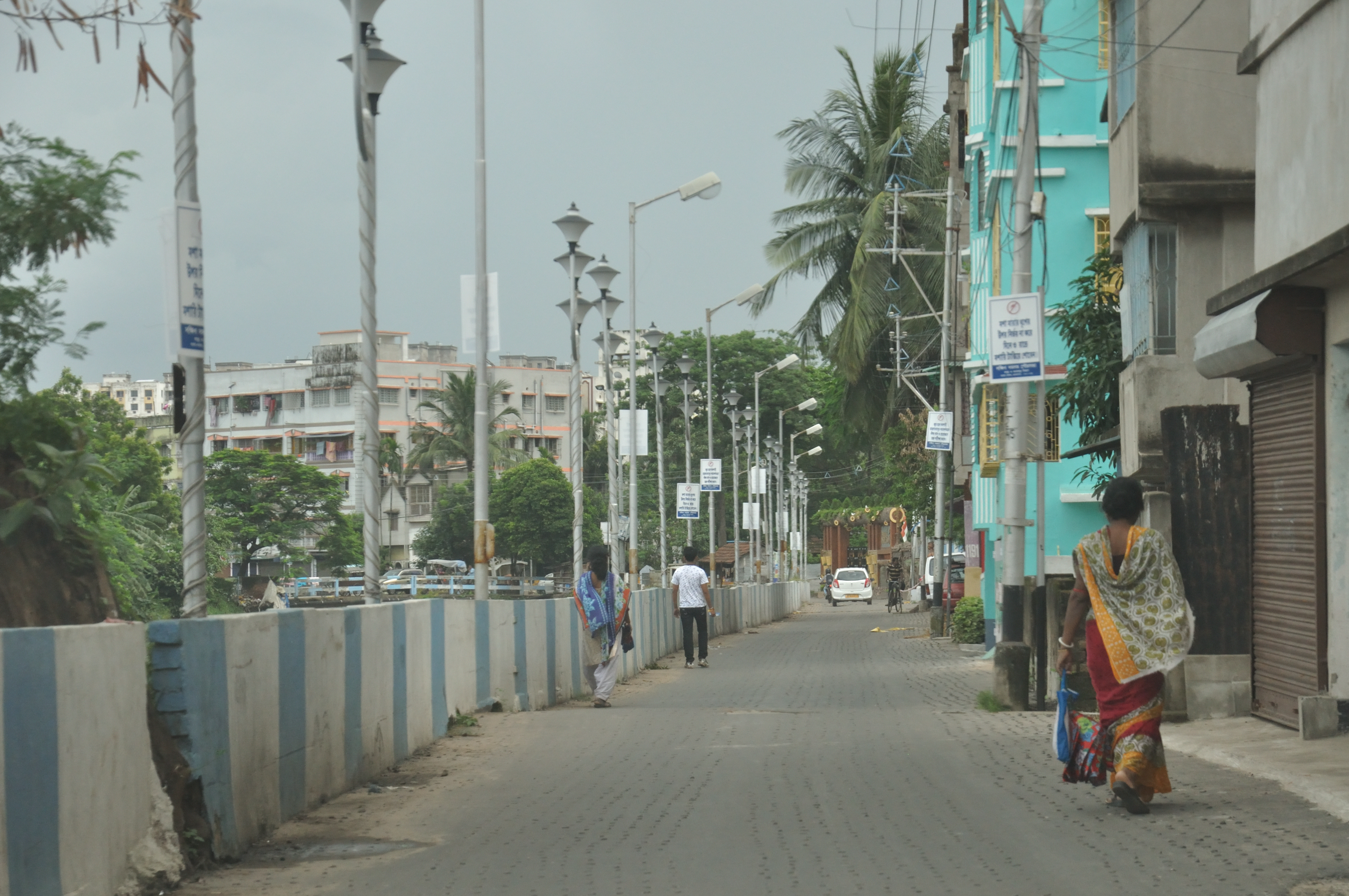
- Jawpur Rd, Dum Dum

- Location in Kolkata Jawpur (West Bengal) Jawpur (India)
- Coordinates: 22.6403°N 88.4077°E
- Country: India
- State: West Bengal
- Division: Presidency
- District: North 24 Parganas
- Metro Station: Dum Dum
- Railway Station: Dum Dum Junction

Government
  - Type: Municipality
  - Body: South Dumdum Municipality

Languages
  - Official: Bengali, English
- Time zone: UTC+5:30 (IST)
- PIN: 700074
- Telephone code: +91 33
- Vehicle registration: WB
- Lok Sabha constituency: Dum Dum
- Vidhan Sabha constituency: Dum Dum

Jawpur is a locality in South Dumdum of North 24 Parganas district in the Indian state of West Bengal. It is a part of the area covered by Kolkata Metropolitan Development Authority (KMDA).

== Geography ==
=== Police station ===
Newly established Nagerbazar police station under Barrackpore Police Commissionerate has jurisdiction over Jawpur areas.

=== Post office ===
Jawpore has a non-delivery sub post office, with PIN 700074 in the Kolkata North Division of Kolkata district in Calcutta region. Other post offices with the same PIN are Dum Dum Road and Motijheel.

== Transport ==
=== Railways ===
Dum Dum Junction railway station is situated nearby.

=== Metro ===
Dum Dum metro station of Blue Line is situated nearby.

=== Bus ===
Several buses ply on Dum Dum Road.

== Markets ==
Markets near Jawpur area are:

- Kalindi Vatika Market
- Kalindi Bazar Market
- Dum Dum Road Market
- Dum Dum New Market
