= Purba Sinthee =

- Neighbourhood
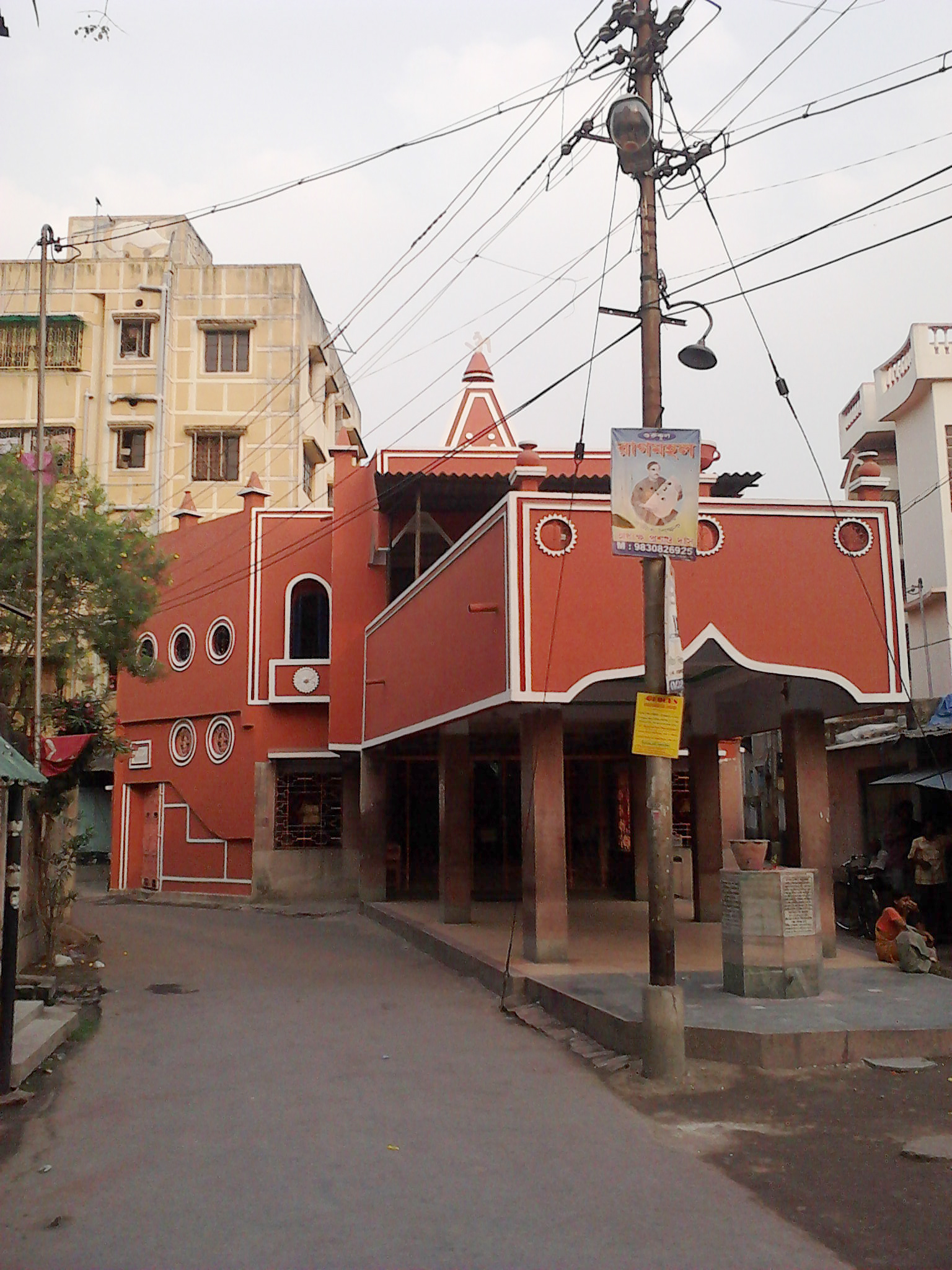
- Shyamasundari Mandir, Purba Sinthee

- Location in Kolkata Purba Sinthee (West Bengal) Purba Sinthee (India)
- Coordinates: 22.6276°N 88.3986°E
- Country: India
- State: West Bengal
- Division: Presidency
- District: North 24 Parganas
- Metro Station: Dum Dum
- Railway Station: Dum Dum Junction

Government
  - Type: Municipality
  - Body: South Dumdum Municipality

Languages
  - Official: Bengali, English
- Time zone: UTC+5:30 (IST)
- PIN: 700030
- Telephone code: +91 33
- Vehicle registration: WB
- Lok Sabha constituency: Dum Dum
- Vidhan Sabha constituency: Dum Dum

Purba Sinthee or Purba Sinthi is a locality in South Dumdum of North 24 Parganas district in the Indian state of West Bengal. It is a part of the area covered by Kolkata Metropolitan Development Authority (KMDA).

== Geography ==
=== Police station ===
Newly established Nagerbazar police station under Barrackpore Police Commissionerate has jurisdiction over Purba Sinthee areas.

=== Post Office ===
Purba Sinthee has a non-delivery sub post office, with PIN 700030 in the Kolkata North Division of Kolkata district in Calcutta region. Other post offices with the same PIN are Sethbagan and Ghughudanga.

== Markets ==
- Purba Sinthee Kadamtala Market
- Purba Sinthee Natun Bazar
- Dum Dum Road Market
- Dum Dum New Market

== Transport ==
=== Railways ===
Dum Dum Junction railway station is situated nearby.

=== Metro ===
Dum Dum metro station of Blue Line is situated nearby.

=== Bus ===
Several buses ply on Dum Dum Road.
