= Amarpalli, Dum Dum =

Amarpally
- Neighbourhood
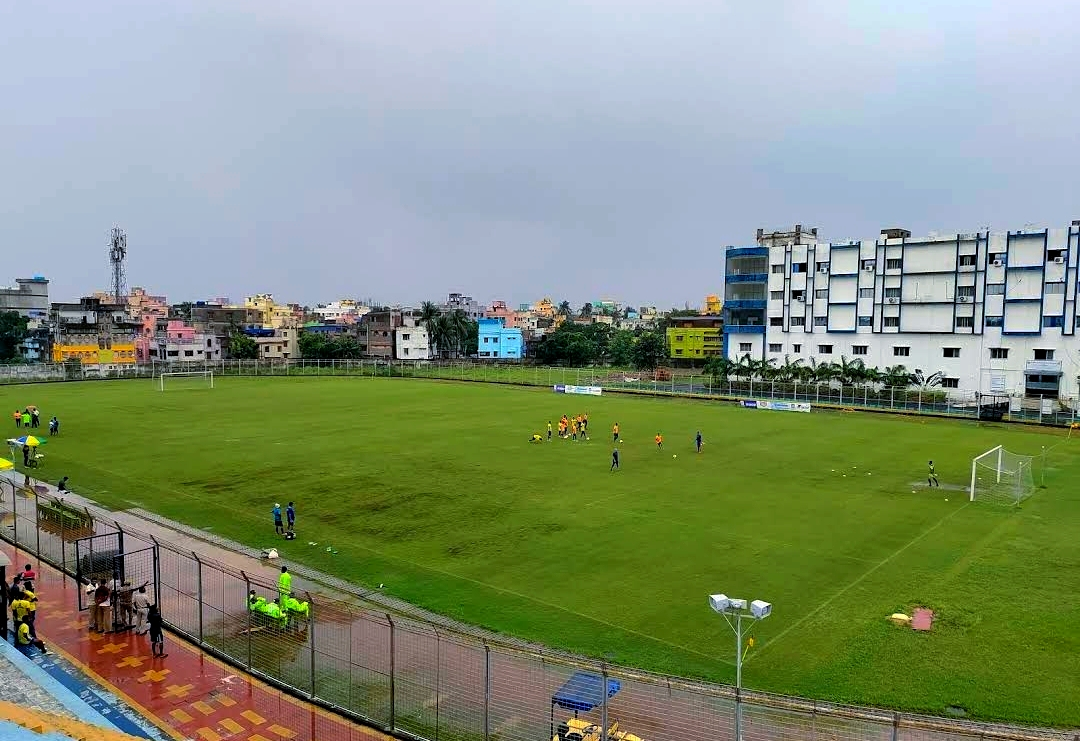
- Amal Dutta Krirangan, Surer Math

- Location in Kolkata Amarpally (West Bengal) Amarpally (India)
- Coordinates: 22.6232°N 88.4107°E
- Country: India
- State: West Bengal
- Division: Presidency
- District: North 24 Parganas
- Metro Station: Dum Dum
- Railway Station: Dum Dum Junction

Government
  - Type: Municipality
  - Body: South Dumdum Municipality

Languages
  - Official: Bengali, English
- Time zone: UTC+5:30 (IST)
- PIN: 700074
- Telephone code: +91 33
- Vehicle registration: WB
- Lok Sabha constituency: Dum Dum
- Vidhan Sabha constituency: Dum Dum

Amarpally is a locality in South Dumdum of North 24 Parganas district in the Indian state of West Bengal. It is a part of the area covered by Kolkata Metropolitan Development Authority (KMDA).

== Geography ==
=== Police station ===
Newly established Nagerbazar police station under Barrackpore Police Commissionerate has jurisdiction over Amarpally areas.

=== Post office ===
Dum Dum Road has a non-delivery sub post office, with PIN 700074 in the Kolkata North Division of Kolkata district in Calcutta region. Other post offices with the same PIN are Jawpore and Motijheel.

== Transport ==
=== Railways ===
Dum Dum Junction railway station is situated nearby.

=== Metro ===
Dum Dum metro station of Blue Line is situated nearby.

=== Bus ===
Several buses ply on Dum Dum Road.

== Markets ==
Markets near Amarpally area are:

- Nagerbazar Market
- Dum Dum Road Market
- Dum Dum New Market
