= Bediapara, Dum Dum =

Bediapara
- Neighbourhood
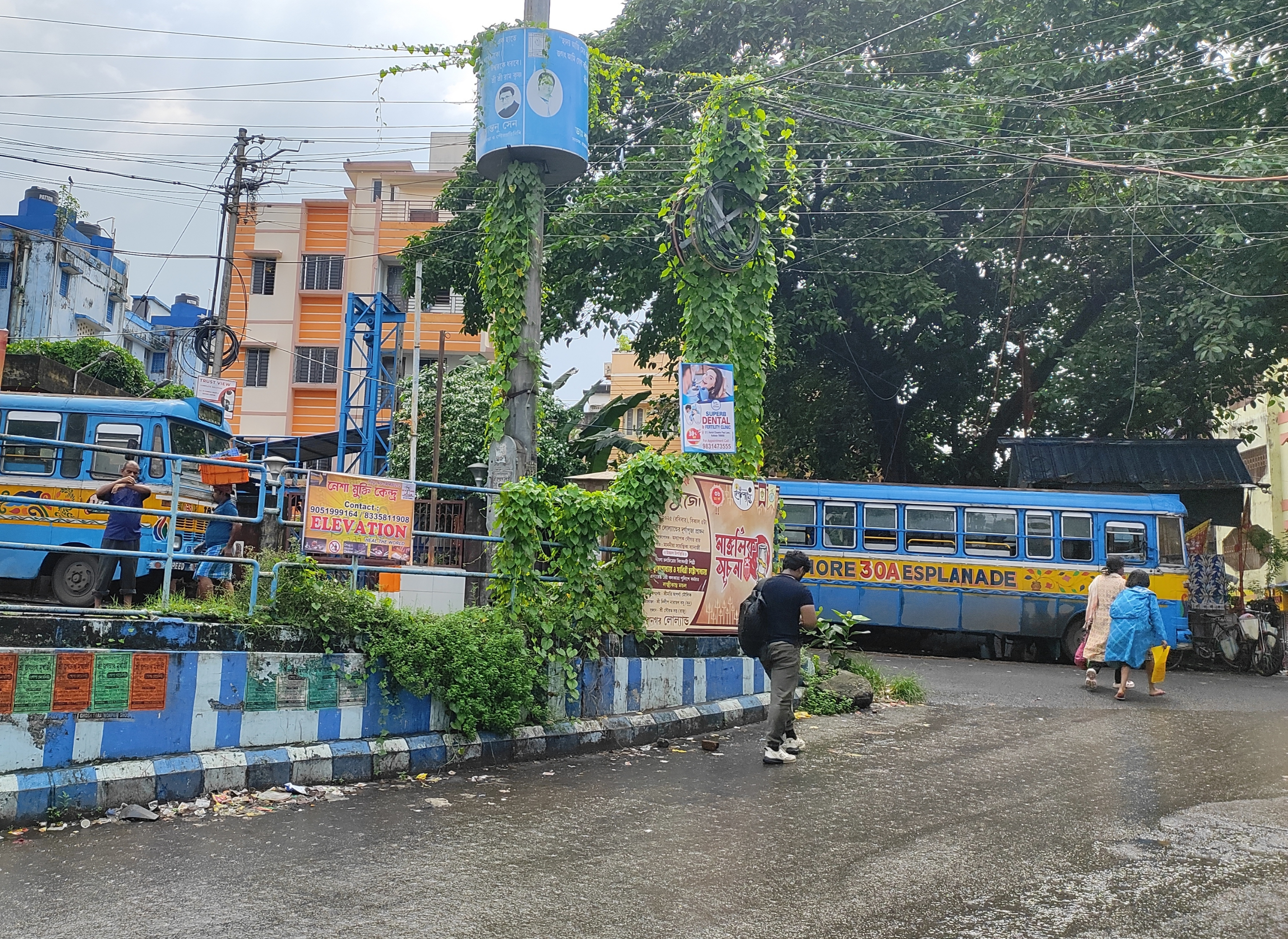
- 30A Bus stand

- Location in Kolkata Bediapara (West Bengal) Bediapara (India)
- Coordinates: 22.6311°N 88.3966°E
- Country: India
- State: West Bengal
- Division: Presidency
- District: North 24 Parganas
- Metro Station: Dum Dum
- Railway Station: Dum Dum Junction

Government
  - Type: Municipality
  - Body: South Dumdum Municipality

Languages
  - Official: Bengali, English
- Time zone: UTC+5:30 (IST)
- PIN: 700077
- Telephone code: +91 33
- Vehicle registration: WB
- Lok Sabha constituency: Dum Dum
- Vidhan Sabha constituency: Dum Dum

Bediapara is a locality in South Dumdum of North 24 Parganas district in the Indian state of West Bengal. It is a part of the area covered by Kolkata Metropolitan Development Authority (KMDA).

== Geography ==
=== Police station ===
Newly established Nagerbazar police station under Barrackpore Police Commissionerate has jurisdiction over Bediapara areas.

=== Post office ===
Bediapara has a delivery sub post office near Bandhu Mahal Club, with PIN 700077 in the Kolkata North Division of Kolkata district in Calcutta region.

== Transport ==
=== Railways ===
Dum Dum Junction railway station and Dum Dum Cantonment railway stations are the nearest railway stations.

=== Metro ===
Dum Dum metro station of Blue Line and Dum Dum Cantonment metro station of Yellow line are the nearest metro stations.

=== Bus ===
Bus route no. 30A which runs from Sinthee More to Esplanade serves the area.

== Markets ==
Markets in or near Bediapara area are:

- Bandhu Mahal Club Market
- Purba Sinthee Natun Bazar
- S Paul Fish Market

== Notable residents ==
- Manu Munsi
