= Satgachi =

- Neighbourhood in South Dumdum
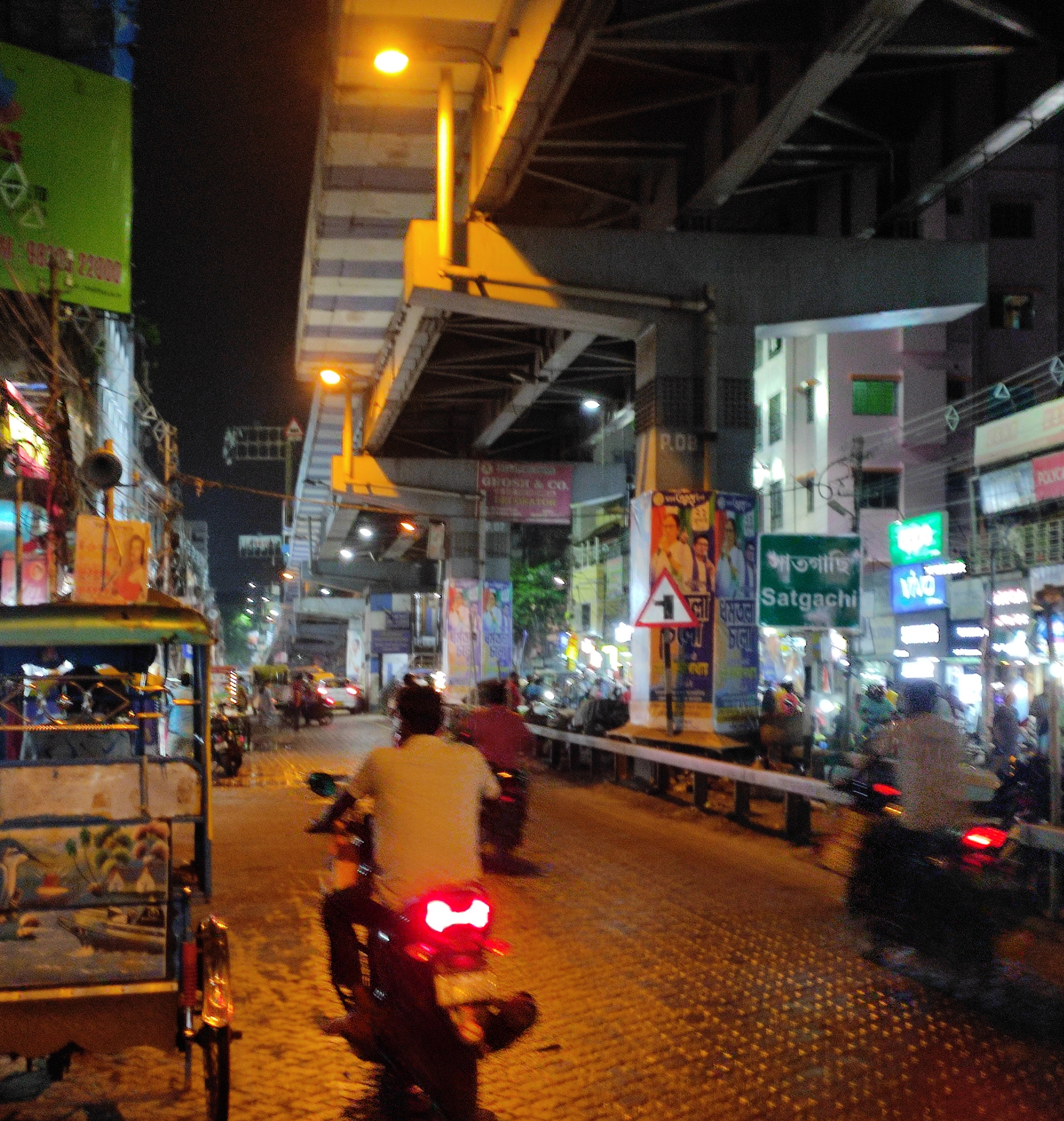
- Jessore Rd, Satgachi

- Location in Kolkata Satgachi (West Bengal) Satgachi (India)
- Coordinates: 22.6151°N 88.4186°E
- Country: India
- State: West Bengal
- Division: Presidency
- District: North 24 Parganas
- Metro Station: Dum Dum
- Railway Station: Dum Dum Junction

Government
  - Type: Municipality
  - Body: South Dumdum Municipality

Languages
  - Official: Bengali, English
- Time zone: UTC+5:30 (IST)
- PIN: 700028
- Telephone code: +91 33
- Vehicle registration: WB
- Lok Sabha constituency: Dum Dum
- Vidhan Sabha constituency: Rajarhat Gopalpur

Satgachi is a locality in South Dumdum of North 24 Parganas district in the Indian state of West Bengal. It is a part of the area covered by Kolkata Metropolitan Development Authority (KMDA).

== Geography ==
=== Police station ===
Newly established Nagerbazar police station under Barrackpore Police Commissionerate has jurisdiction over Satgachi areas.

=== Post office ===
Jugipara Satgachi has a delivery sub-post office, with PIN 700028 in the Kolkata North Division of Kolkata district in Calcutta region. Nagerbazar is another post office with the same PIN.

== Transport ==
=== Railways ===
The Dum Dum Junction railway station and the Dum Dum Cantonment railway station are nearest railway stations.

=== Metro ===
Dum Dum metro station of Blue Line and Dum Dum Cantonment metro station of Yellow Line are the nearest metro stations.

=== Auto ===
Autos are available towards Dum Dum Junction and Dum Dum Cantonment railway stations from Nagerbazar Auto stand which is located near Nagerbazar Crossing. Autos are also available towards Baguiati via Dakshinpara from Satgachi Auto stand.

== Markets ==
Markets near Satgachi area are:

- Nagerbazar Market
- Dum Dum Park Market
