= Jessore Road =

Highway in South Asia

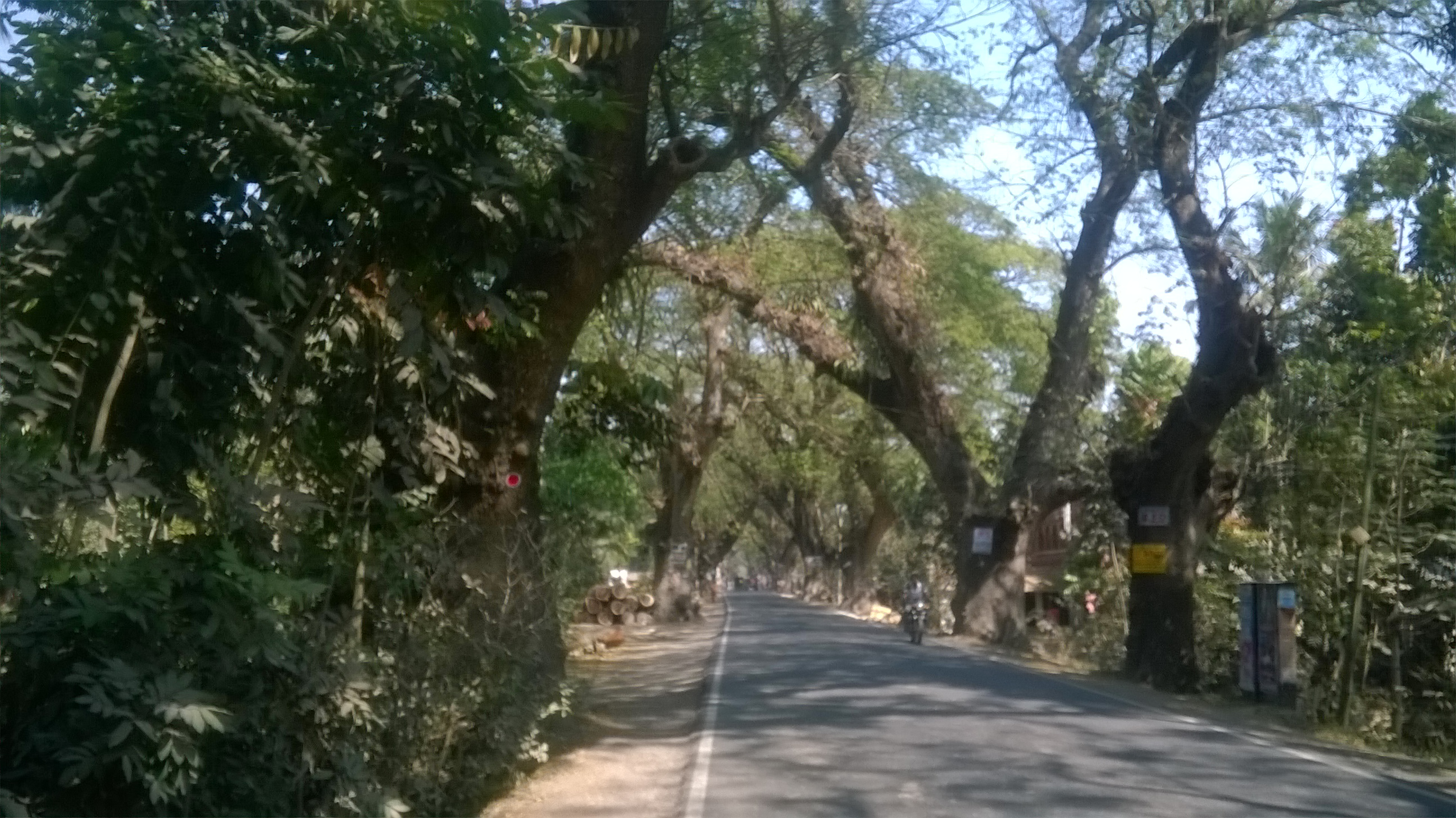

Route information
- Part of AH1
- Length: 121 km (75 mi)
- Existed: British period–present

Major junctions
- West end: Shyambazar, Kolkata, India
- East end: Jashore, Bangladesh

Location
- Countries: India, Bangladesh

Highway system
- Asian Highway Network

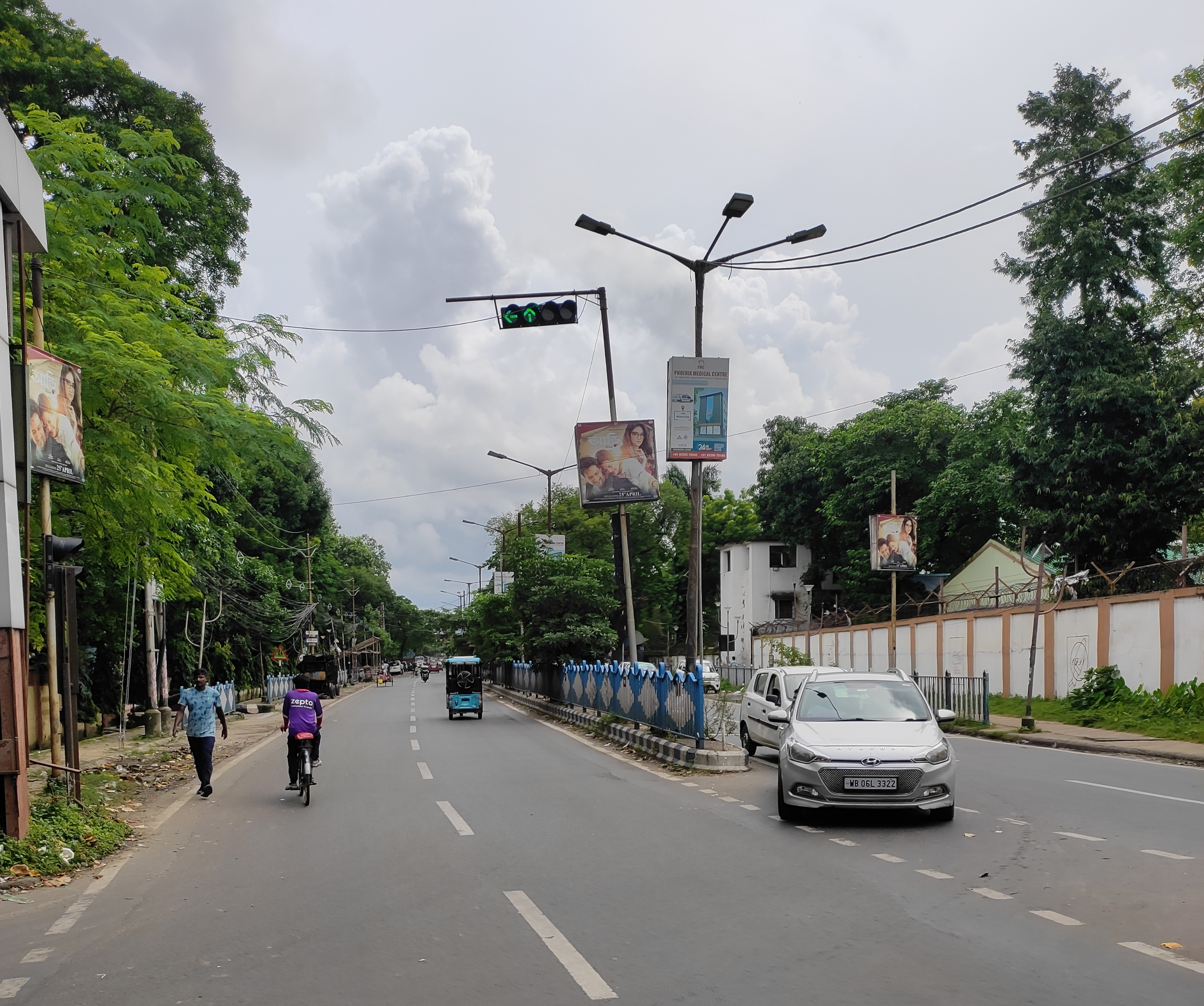
Jessore Road Near Dum Dum, Kolkata, India

Jessore Road is an international highway connecting Kolkata in India with Jashore in Bangladesh. This highway originates at Shyambazar in Kolkata to Daratana interchange in Jashore. While the Indian part of the highway, Dum Dum-Barasat sector is now part of NH 12, the Barasat-Petrapole border is now part of NH 112. And the Bangladeshi part is the part of N706 from Beanpole Border to Jashore. The whole road is part of Asian Highway 1. The part of this road inside Kolkata urban area is still called Jessore Road, and plays an important role to connect Kolkata Airport to downtown Kolkata. And part inside Jashore city is called Mujib Road.

According to legend, the road was made by Kali Prasad Poddar, a landlord of Narail in Jashore. For building the massive road, the HM Government awarded him the title of "Chowdhury".

== History ==
This highway is named after the city of Jashore (old spelling Jessore) (Note: The spelling of the district name in the Latin script was officially changed from Jessore to Jashore in April 2018.) of Bangladesh. Because this highway historically extends from Kolkata to Jashore. In British India, the landlord of Narail, Jashore, built this road to facilitate communication between Jashore, the first district of undivided Bengal, and the capital of British India, Kolkata. Later, its importance increased when the Jashore Cantonment was established. During World War II, the Royal Air Force built the Jashore Airport to prevent Japanese aggression, and the importance of Jessore Road increased many times over. Currently, this Jessore Road is the most important highway in India-Bangladesh international land trade. Currently, Jessore Road refers to the highway from Dumdum in Kolkata, India to Jashore in Bangladesh.

== Expansion and development ==
=== Bangladesh ===
The Honorable Prime Minister of Bangladesh took the initiative to widen the highway into an expressway as it became more important and the cabinet decided to cut down the almost two hundred year old trees located on Jessore Road and widen it, but nature lovers and the common people of Jashore district started protests which spread all over the country and the government suspended the project in the face of this public protest. Later, the government accepted the people's demands and took the initiative to widen the road by keeping the trees. Which is currently underway. However, it is hoped that the widening of the Bangladesh part will be completed in a few years.

=== India ===
The National Roads Authority has started the survey work for the expansion of Jessore Road from Barasat to Bangaon. According to administration sources, representatives of the North 24 Parganas district administration, local municipalities and panchayat samiti met with the National Roads Authority today, Friday, to prepare a design for the implementation of the plan. Under the supervision of Rajiv Chattaraj, Superintending Engineer of the National Roads Authority, "The survey for the expansion of the road is underway." The 60-kilometer-long Jessore Road (National Road No. 35) from Dakbanglo intersection in Barasat to Petrapole border in Bangaon will be expanded to four lanes. In this regard, the ruling party’s district leader and food minister Jyotipriyo Mallick said, "The Chief Minister has ordered that the road work must be completed smoothly and quickly. "The National Highways Authority of India has planned to construct flyovers at all the railway gates on the road, such as Kazipara, Ashoknagar, Habra and Bangaon in Barasat. The tender for the work has been finalised. After going 9 kilometers from Kolkata Airport, Jessore Road splits into two at the Dakbanglo intersection in Barasat. One direction goes to North Bengal via Dalkhola, whose official name is National Highway No. 34. The other, under the name Jessore Road (National Highway No. 35), goes to the Bangladesh border at Petrapole in Bangaon. Currently, the work of expanding National Highway No. 34 has started after overcoming many obstacles. This time, the work of expanding National Highway No. 35 is being started.

== Other key connection on this road ==
The road part acts as a major link between urban places and still around called Kolkata Jessore Road, especially and Netaji Subhash Chandra Bose International Airport and Barasat. Metro stations on this road include Shyambazar, Belgachia and Jessore Road.

Several locations lie between Patipukur and Barasat on Jessore Road such as Patipukur Railway Station, Lake Town, Bangur Avenue, Dum Dum Park, Nagerbazar, Dum Dum Cantonment, Birati, Madhyamgram, Barasat etc.

== Poem ==
Allen Ginsberg wrote a poem "September on Jessore Road" after visiting refugee camps in 1971:

Millions of babies watching the skies
Bellies swollen, with big round eyes
On Jessore Road—long bamboo huts...
