= Patipukur =

- Neighbourhood in South Dumdum
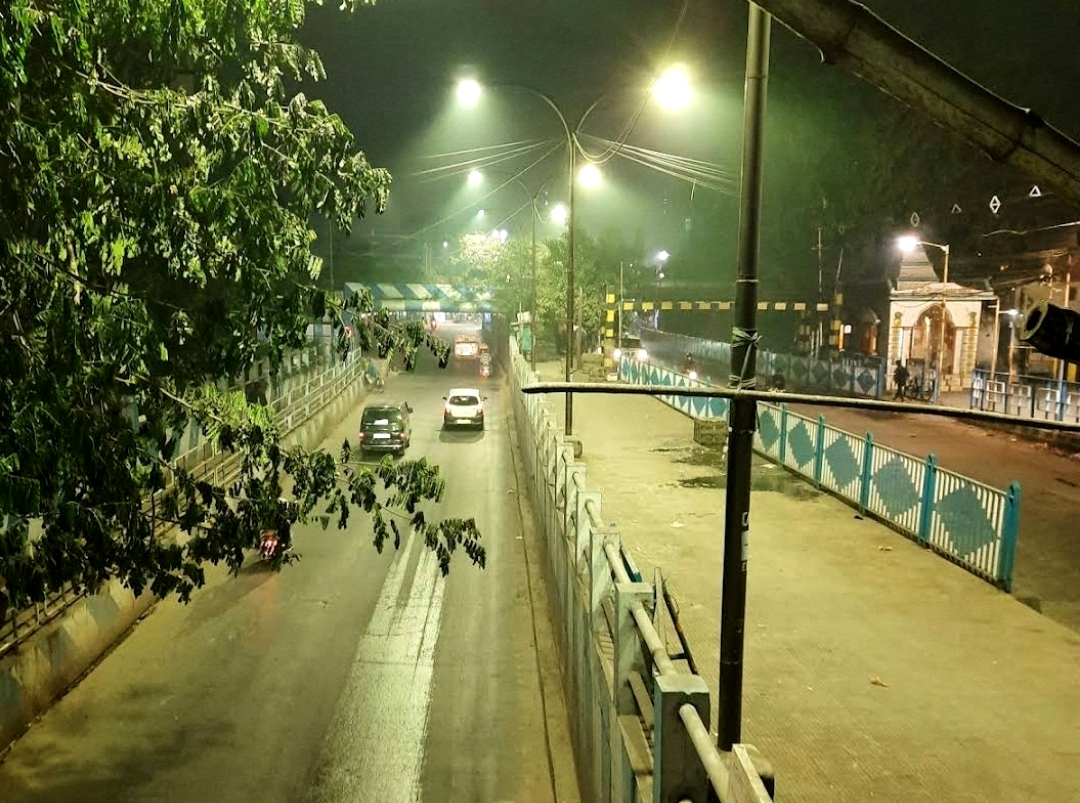

- Location in Kolkata Patipukur (West Bengal) Patipukur (India)
- Coordinates: 22.6044°N 88.3955°E
- Country: India
- State: West Bengal
- Division: Presidency
- District: North 24 Parganas
- Metro Station: Belgachia; Dum Dum
- Railway Station: Dum Dum Junction; Patipukur

Government
  - Type: Municipality
  - Body: South Dumdum Municipality

Languages
  - Official: Bengali, English
- Time zone: UTC+5:30 (IST)
- PIN: 700037, 700048
- Telephone code: +91 33
- Vehicle registration: WB
- Vidhan Sabha constituency: Bidhannagar

Patipukur is a locality in South Dumdum of North 24 Parganas district in the Indian state of West Bengal. It is a part of the area covered by Kolkata Metropolitan Development Authority (KMDA).

== Geography ==
=== Police station ===
Lake Town police station under Bidhannagar Police Commissionerate has jurisdiction over Patipukur areas.

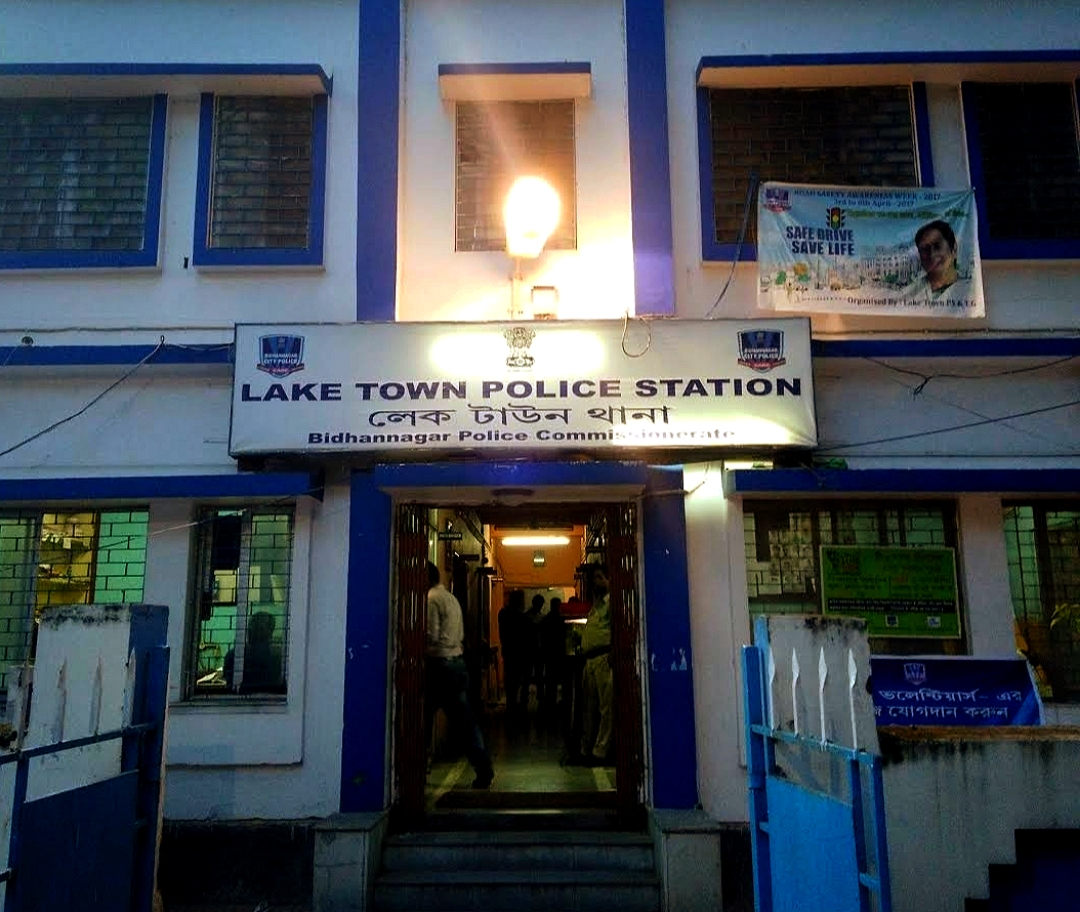
Lake Town police station

=== Post office ===
Patipukur has a non-delivery sub-post office, with PIN 700048 in the Kolkata East Division of North 24 Parganas district in Calcutta region. Other post offices with the same PIN are Sreebhumi and Sadhana Ausudhalaya Road (Dakshindari).

== Markets ==
Markets in or near Bediapara area are:

- Patipukur Fish Market
- Annapurna Market
- Kalindi Vatika Market
- Kalindi Bazar Market
