= Sinthee =

- Neighbourhood in Kolkata (Calcutta)
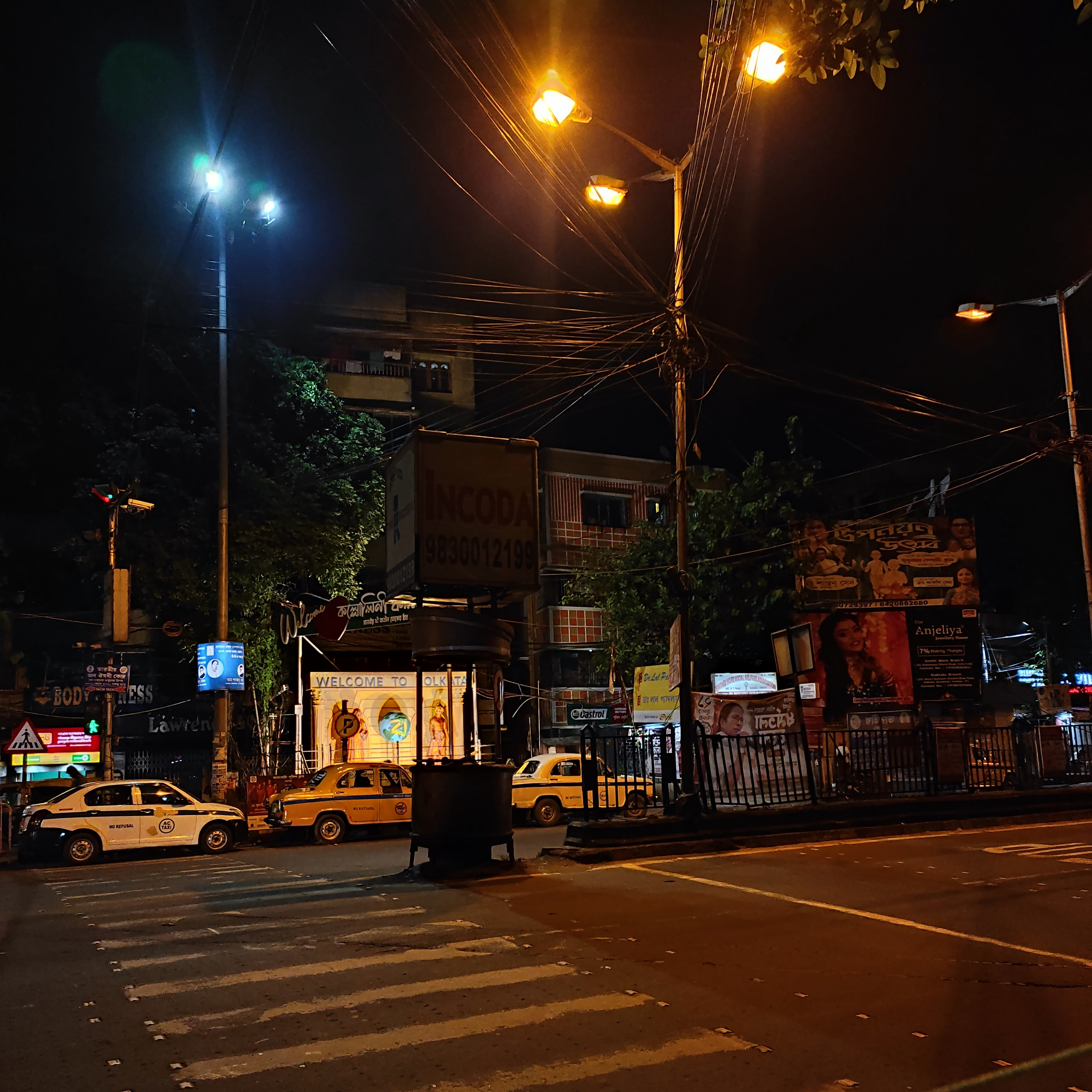
- Sinthee More

- Location in Kolkata Sinthee (West Bengal)
- Coordinates: 22°37′41″N 88°23′04″E
- Country: India
- State: West Bengal
- City: Kolkata
- District: Kolkata
- Metro Station: Dum Dum
- Kolkata Suburban Railway: Dum Dum Junction
- Municipal Corporation: Kolkata Municipal Corporation
- KMC ward: 2

Population
  - Total: For population see linked KMC ward page
- Time zone: UTC+5:30 (IST)
- PIN: 700050
- Area code: +91 33
- Lok Sabha constituency: Kolkata Uttar
- Vidhan Sabha constituency: Kashipur-Belgachhia

Sinthee or Sinthi is a neighbourhood of North Kolkata in Kolkata district in the Indian state of West Bengal.

== History ==
The East India Company obtained from the Mughal emperor Farrukhsiyar, in 1717, the right to rent from 38 villages surrounding their settlement. Of these 5 lay across the Hooghly in what is now Howrah district. The remaining 33 villages were on the Calcutta side. After the fall of Siraj-ud-Daulah, the last independent Nawab of Bengal, it purchased these villages in 1758 from Mir Jafar and reorganised them. These villages were known en-bloc as Dihi Panchannagram and Sinthee was one of them. It was considered to be a suburb beyond the limits of the Maratha Ditch.

== Geography ==
=== Location ===
Sinthee is surrounded by South Dum Dum and Dum Dum in the east, Dum Dum Road in the south, Baranagar in the north, Cossipore & Barrackpore Trunk Road in the west.

=== Police district ===
Sinthee police station is part of the North and North Suburban division of Kolkata Police. Located at 145/1 South Sinthi Road, Kolkata-700050, it has jurisdiction over Sinthee neighbourhood/ Ward No. 2 of Kolkata Municipal Corporation.

Amherst Street Women police station covers all police districts under the jurisdiction of the North and North Suburban division i.e. Amherst Street, Jorabagan, Shyampukur, Cossipore, Chitpur, Sinthi, Burtolla and Tala.

=== Landmarks ===
- Rabindra Bharati University
- B. T. Road Government Sponsored H. S. School
- Birla Institute of Technology
- Department of Economics, University of Calcutta

== Transport ==
=== Road ===
B.T. Road passes along the west boundary of Sinthee. Many buses ply through 'Sinthee More' on B.T. Road. The only bus (Private bus) which enters into Sinthee is 30A (Sinthee More - Esplanade), which runs along KC Ghosh Road.

A large number of buses ply on B.T. Road via Sinthee More are as follows:

WBTC Bus

- AC 54 (Rathtala - Howrah Stn)
- S 9A (Dunlop - Ballygunge Stn)
- E-32 (Nilgunj Depot - Howrah Stn)
- ACT-32 (Barrackpore - Howrah Stn)
- AC-54B (Barrackpore - Howrah Stn)
- AC 20 (Barrackpore - Santragachi)
- S 32 (Barrackpore Court - Howrah Stn)
- S 11 (Nilgunj Depot - Esplanade)
- S 57 (Ariadaha - Nabanna)
- S 58 (Barrackpore - Karunamoyee)
- M-34 (Dum Dum Cant - Esplanade)

Private Bus

- 30A (Sinthee More - Esplanade)
- 34C (Noapara - Esplanade)
- K-4 (Dakshineswar - Ruby)
- 78 (Barrackpore - Esplanade)
- 78/1 (Rahara - Babughat)
- 201 (Nimta - Salt Lake Sector V)
- 214 (Sajirhat - Babughat)
- 214A (Sodepur Girja - Esplanade)
- 32A (Dakshineswar - Salt Lake Sector V)
- 222 (Bon-Hooghly - Behala Chowrasta)
- 230 (Kamarhati - Alipur Zoo)
- 234 (Belgharia - Golf Green)
- 234/1 (Belgharia - Golf Green)
- S-164 Mini (Tobin Road - BBD Bag)
- S-180 Mini (Belgharia - Howrah Fire Service)
- S-185 Mini (Nimta Paikpara - Howrah Stn)
- Nagerbazar - Salap More Bus
- Nagerbazar - Dankuni Housing Bus
- Lake Town - Dankuni Housing Bus
- Kamalgazi - Dankuni Housing Bus
- Barrackpore - Howrah Stn Bus
- Madhyamgram - Howrah Stn Bus
- Shyambazar - Bagnan Bus etc

=== Train ===
Dum Dum Junction is the nearest railway station of Sinthee. Dum Dum Metro Station is the neighborhood subway station.
