= Nagerbazar =

- Neighbourhood
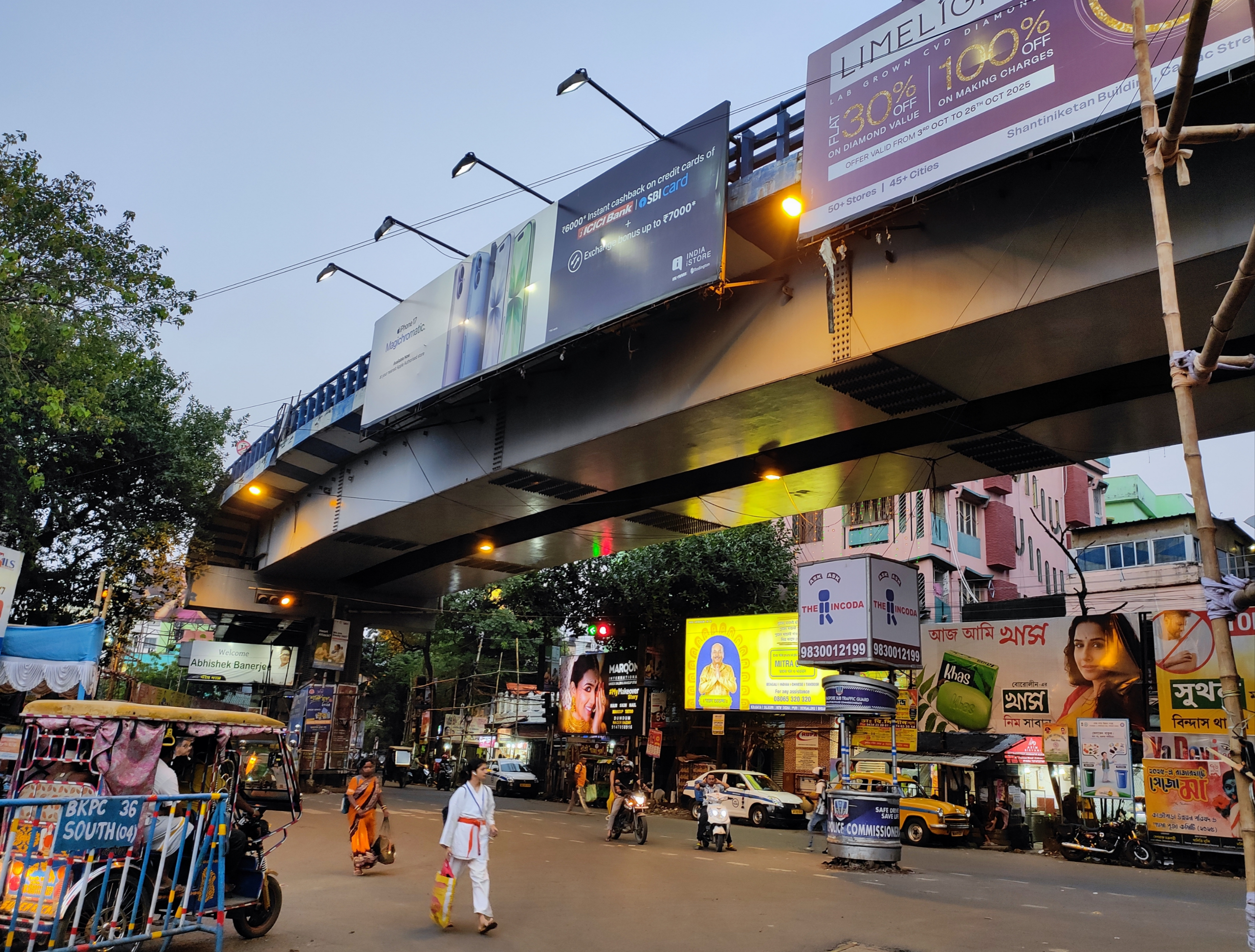
- Dum Dum Road and Jessore Road Junction, Nagerbazar Crossing

- Location in West Bengal, India Nagerbazar (West Bengal) Nagerbazar (India)
- Coordinates: 22.6218°N 88.4180°E
- Country: India
- State: West Bengal
- Division: Presidency
- District: North 24 Parganas
- Metro Station: Dum Dum; Dum Dum Cantonment
- Railway Station: Dum Dum Junction and Dum Dum Cantonment

Government
  - Type: Municipality
  - Body: South Dumdum Municipality

Languages
  - Official: Bengali, English
- Time zone: UTC+5:30 (IST)
- PIN: 700028, 700074
- Telephone code: +91 33
- Vehicle registration: WB
- Lok Sabha constituency: Dum Dum
- Vidhan Sabha constituency: Dum Dum, Rajarhat Gopalpur

Nagerbazar is a locality in South Dumdum of North 24 Parganas district in the Indian state of West Bengal. It is one of the largest markets in the Dum Dum area. It is a part of the area covered by Kolkata Metropolitan Development Authority (KMDA).

== History ==
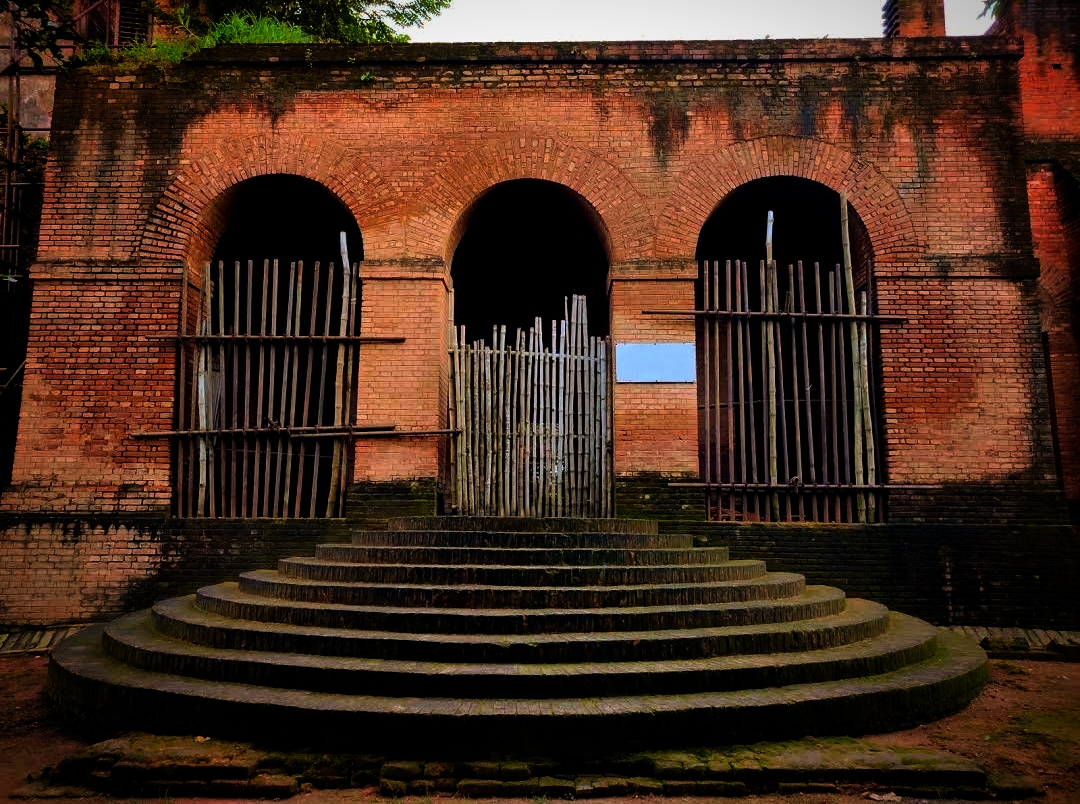
Clive House, Nagerbazar

Clive House is located on Rastraguru Avenue at Ramgarh, Nagerbazar. It is mired in controversy. It is thought of as the first pucca brick and cement building in the Northern fringes of Kolkata, possibly built by the Portuguese. Now, some people are saying that it was the hunting lodge of an Indian prince or noble man (and so where was the jungle?) What is definitely known is that it was used by British soldiers when they first started coming into the country and then Robert Clive took it over, renovated it, added a floor to the single-storeyed building and made it his country house (Some people refer to it as his residence, which appears doubtful) around 1757–60. The house is located on a raised ground. In the otherwise flat surroundings it is even thought of as a mound or a hill. The more interesting part of the story is that "on excavation of Clive House, coins, terracotta figures, sculpture, potteries etc. and information of a Portuguese Fort were found." The articles found could be of the Sen period but some people think that it could have links with the 2,000 years/ more older civilisation unearthed earlier at Chandraketugarh. Clive House is under the Archaeological Survey of India since 2004, but squatters inside and outside Clive House have hindered restoration work.

== Geography ==
It is flanked by Netaji Subhash Chandra Bose International Airport in the north, Dum Dum railway station and Dum Dum metro station in the west, area of Baguiati and adjoining areas of VIP Road in the east and the posh locality of Dum Dum Park and Lake Town in the south.

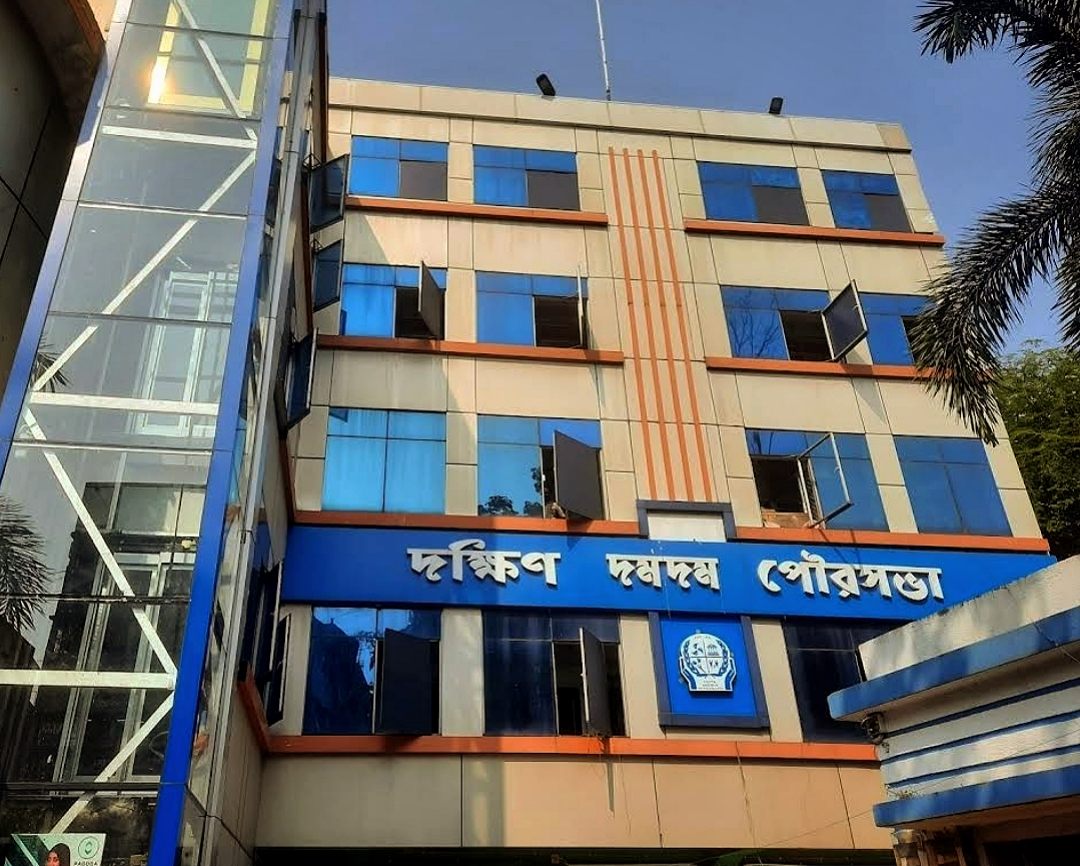
South Dum Dum Municipal Headquarters

=== Police station ===
Newly established Nagerbazar police station under Barrackpore Police Commissionerate has jurisdiction over Nagerbazar areas.

=== Post office ===
Nagerbazar has a non-delivery sub-post office, with PIN 700028 in the Kolkata North Division of Kolkata district in Calcutta region. Jugipara Satgachi is another post office with the same PIN.

== Transport ==
=== Bus ===
Nagerbazar has a bus terminal named Nagerbazar Bus Terminus. A variety of Buses depart from this terminus. Important Bus routes are:

- 3C/1 (Nagerbazar - Anandapur)
- 221 (Nagerbazar - Southern Avenue)
- 202 (Nagerbazar - Science City)
- 219 (Nagerbazar - Howrah Stn.)
- 219/1 (Nagerbazar - Howrah Stn.)
- Nagerbazar - Howrah Mini (S-168)
- Nagerbazar - Dankuni Housing Bus
- Lake Town - Dankuni Housing Bus
- Nagerbazar - Salap More Bus
- 30D (Dum Dum Cant. - Babughat)
- 30B (Gouripur - Babughat)
- S10 (Airport Gate no 3 - Nabanna)
- AC 38 (Dum Dum 11A - Karunamoyee)
- Rajchandrapur - Karunamoyee Bus
- 223 (B.T College - Golf Green)
- DN-8 (Barasat - Salt Lake Sector V)
- DN-9/1 (Barasat - Dakshineswar)
- 79B (Barasat - Bagbazar)
- 93 (Kharibari - Bagbazar)
- D-28 (Chakla - Esplanade)
- AC 40 (Airport - Howrah Maidan)
- Habra - Shyambazar Bus
- DN-18 (Baduria - Shyambazar)

- 91 (Bhangar - Shyambazar)
- 91A (Harao Banstala - Shyambazar)

=== Railways ===
The Dum Dum Junction railway station and the Dum Dum Cantonment railway station are nearest railway stations.

=== Metro ===
Dum Dum metro station of Blue Line and Dum Dum Cantonment metro station of Yellow Line are the nearest metro stations.

=== Auto ===
Autos are available towards Dum Dum Junction and Dum Dum Cantonment. Nagerbazar Auto stand is located near Nagerbazar Crossing.

=== Connectivity ===
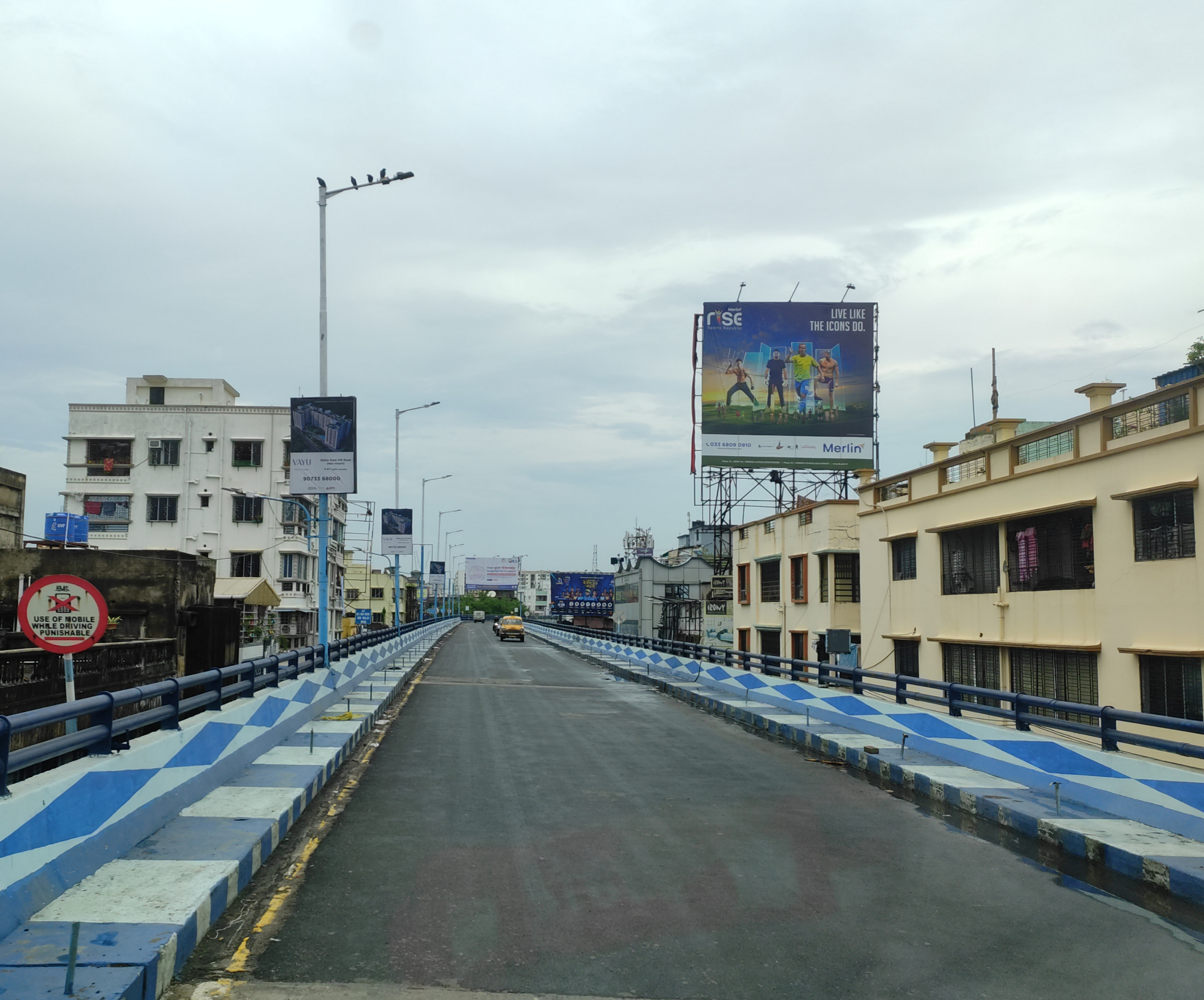
Nagerbazar Flyover

In 2012, a flyover called Ramkrishna Paramhamsa Deb Setu, was opened from Bhagabati Park to Nagerbazar Sarojini Naidu Women College to decongest the heavy traffic on Jessore Road towards Dumdum/Kolkata Airport.

== Gallery ==
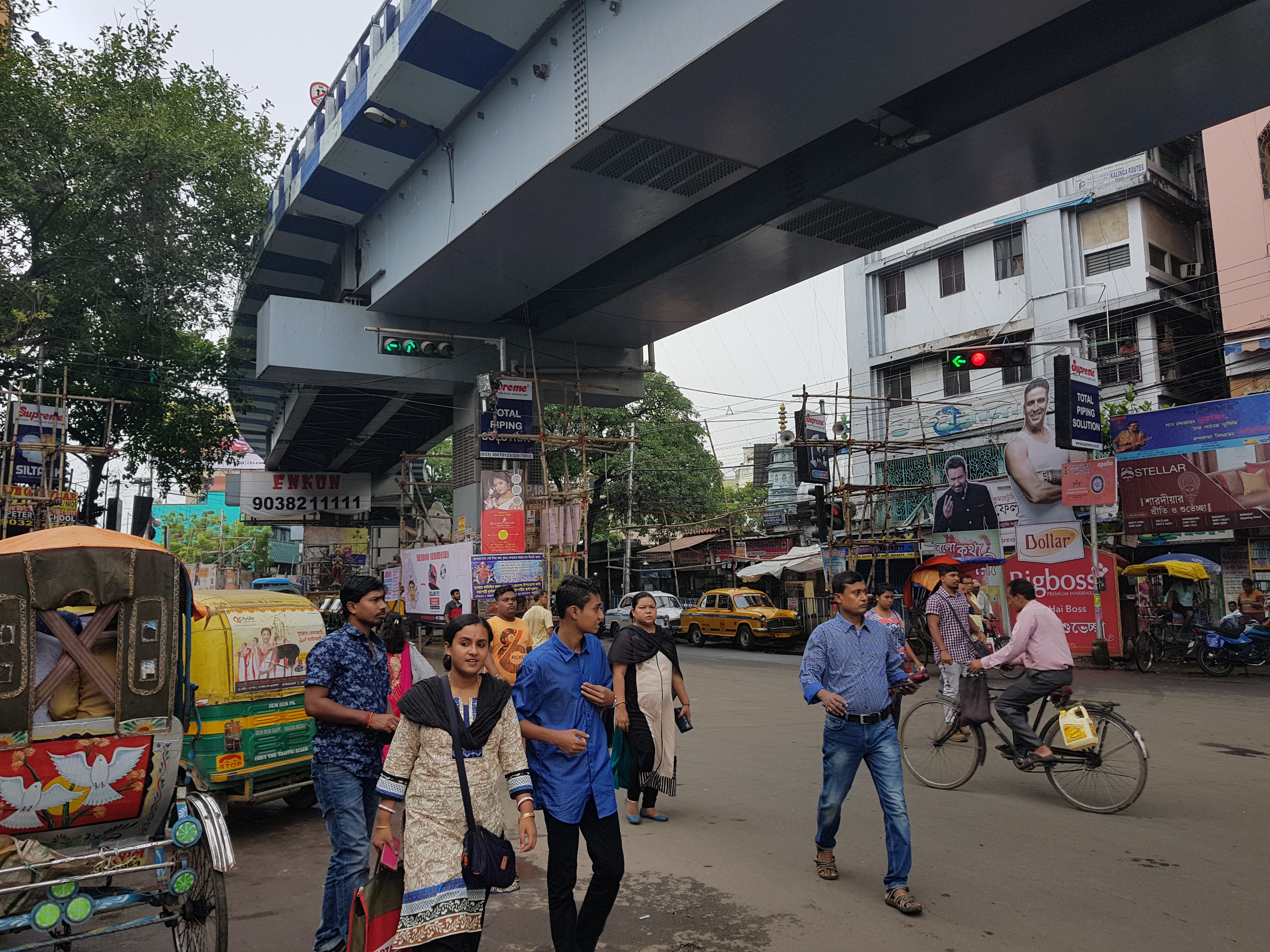
Nagerbazar Crossing and Flyover

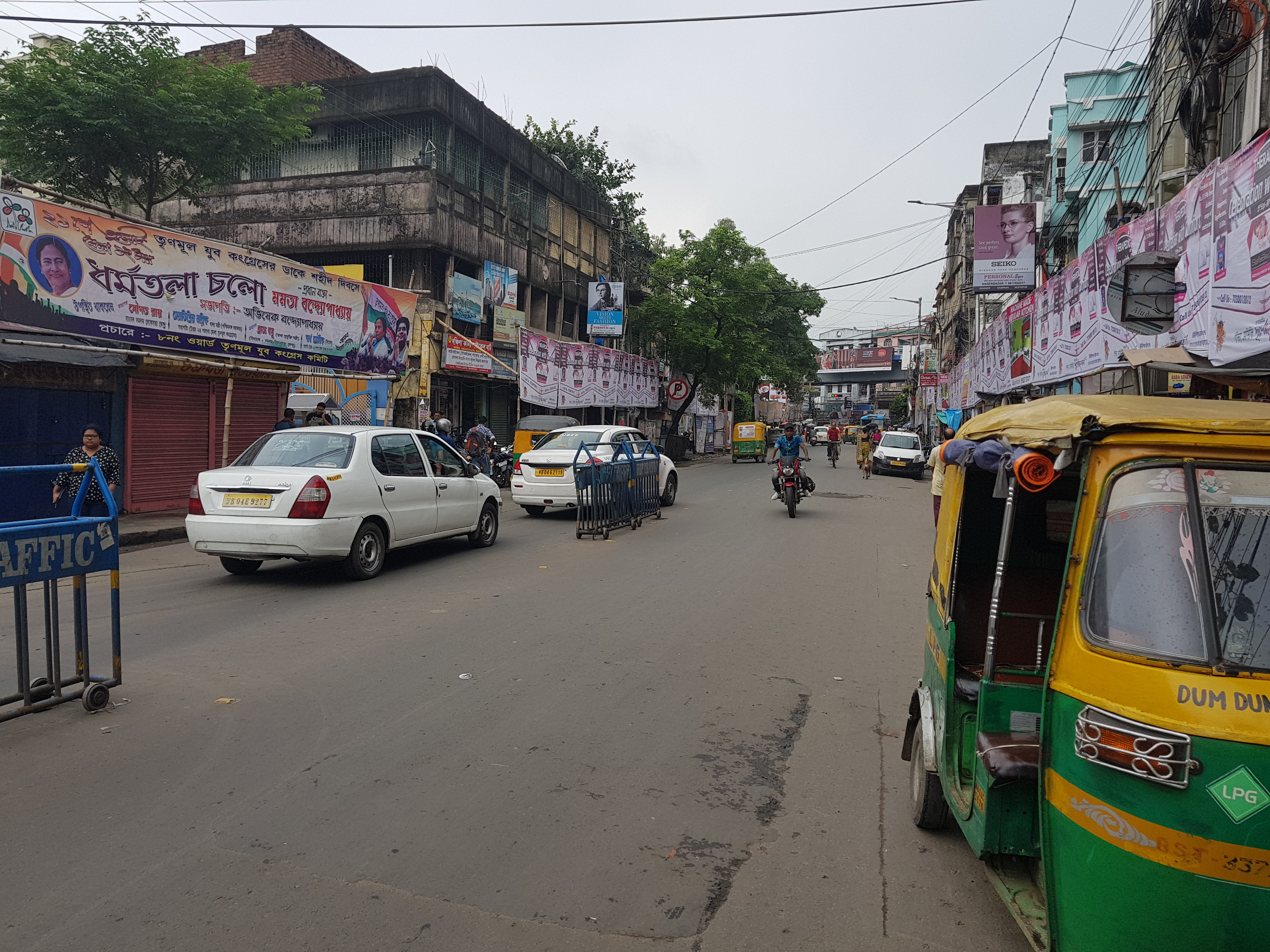
Dum Dum Road in Nagerbazar

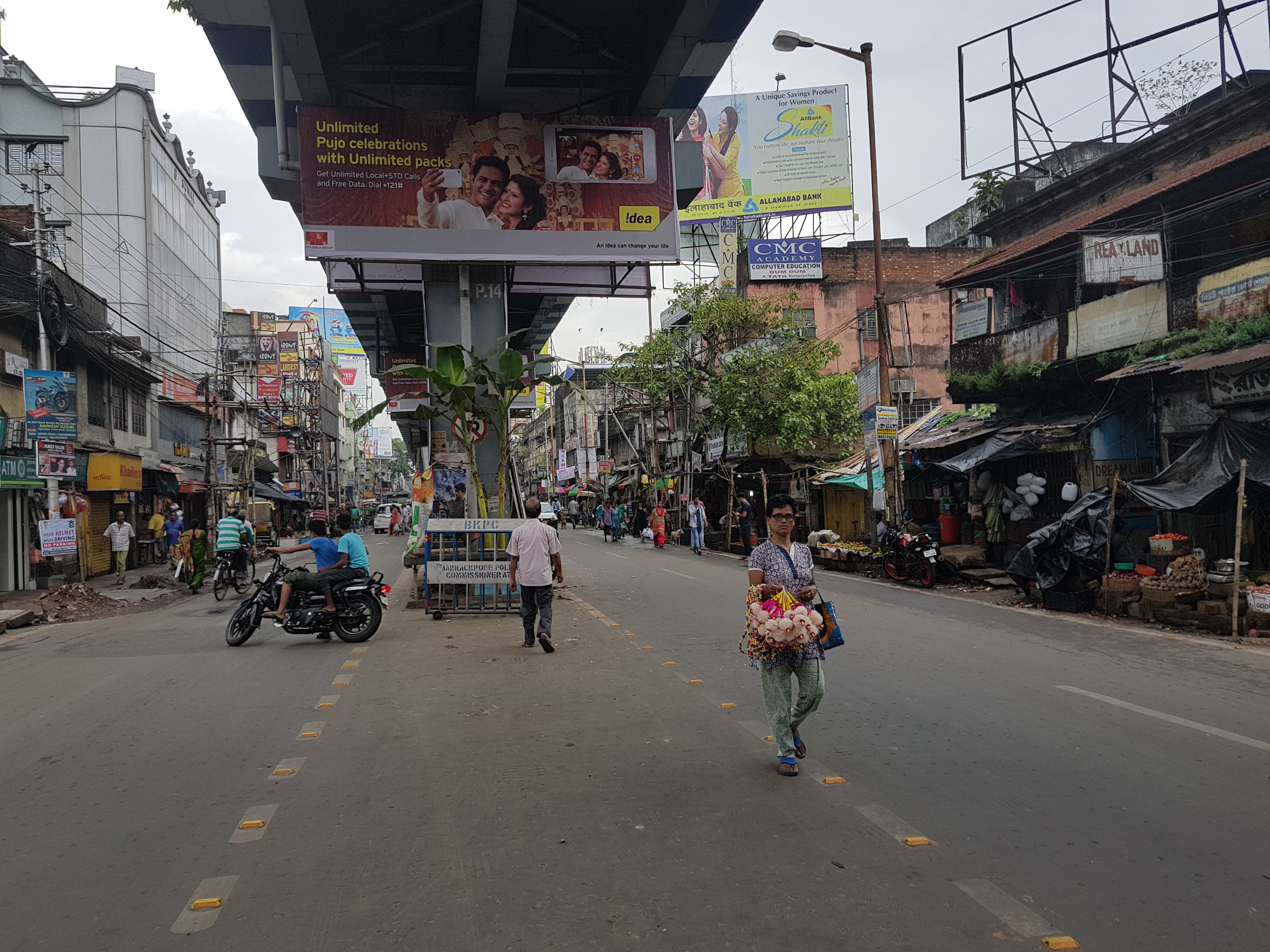
Jessore Road in Nagerbazar

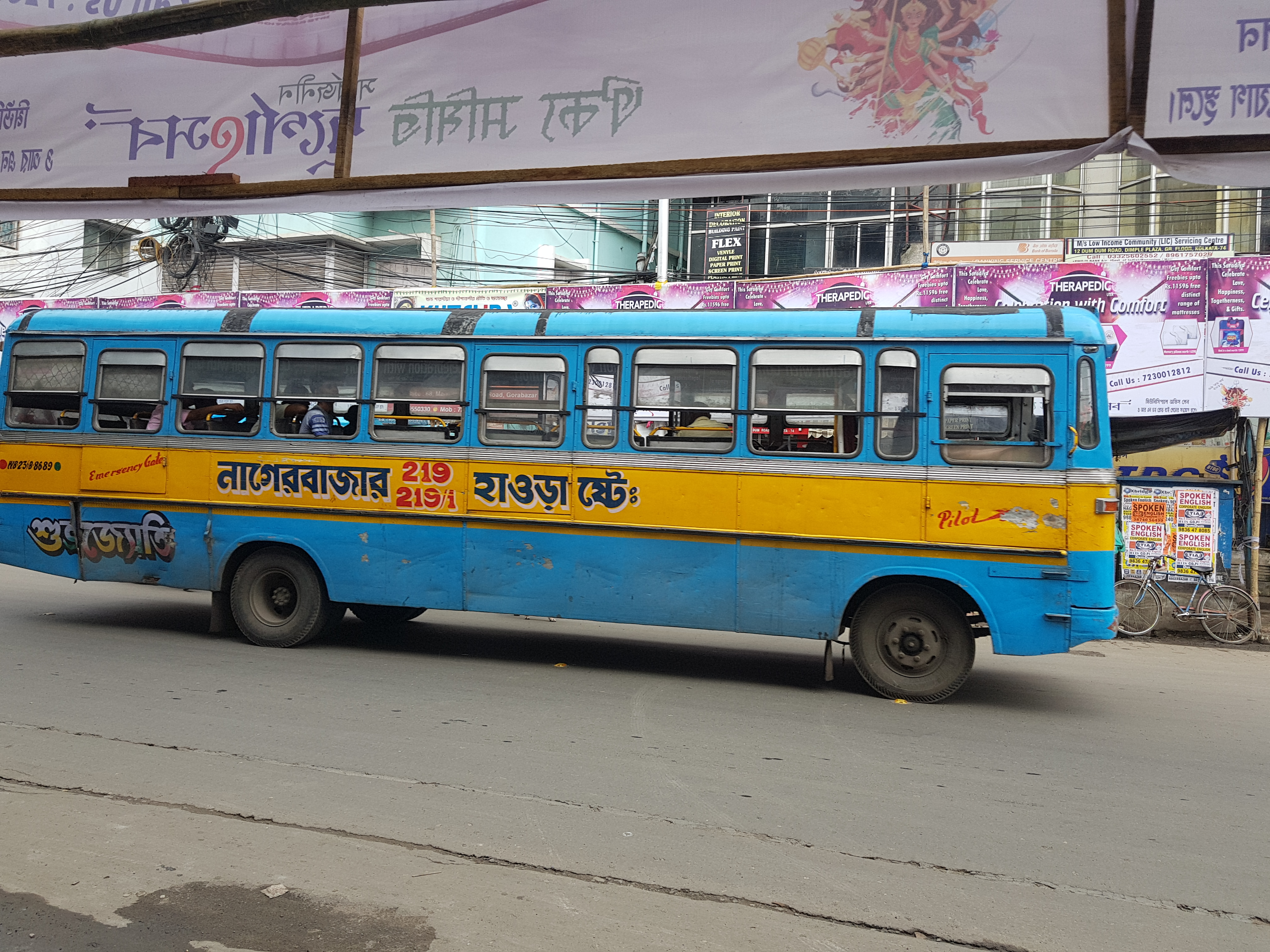
A Private Bus in Nagerbazar

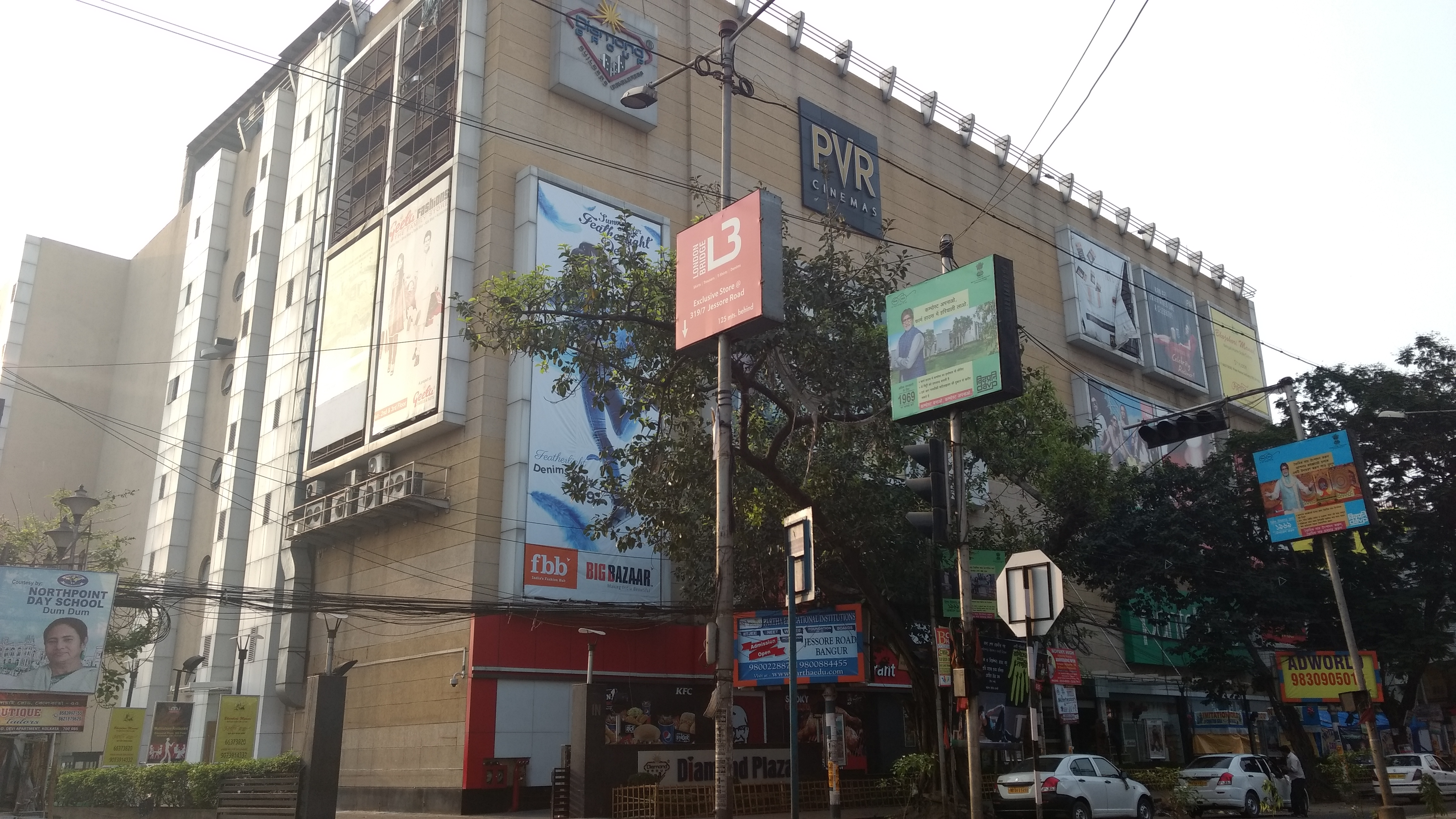
Diamond Plaza Mall, Satgachi (Near Nagerbazar)

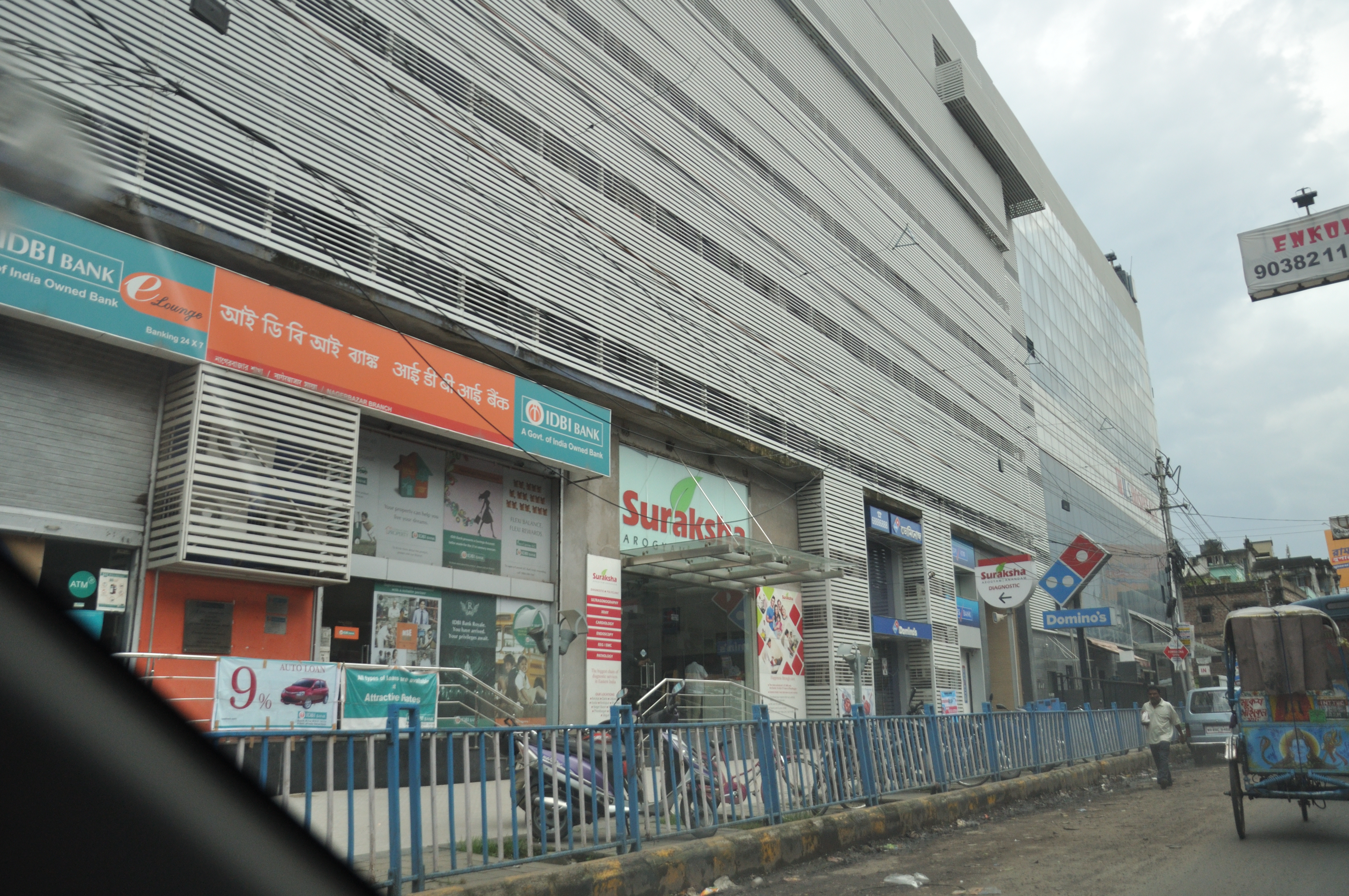
Saltee Plaza (Commercial Complex), Nagerbazar

== See also ==
- Kolkata
- South Dum Dum
- Dum Dum
