= Patipukur railway station =

Railway Station in West Bengal, India

Patipukur

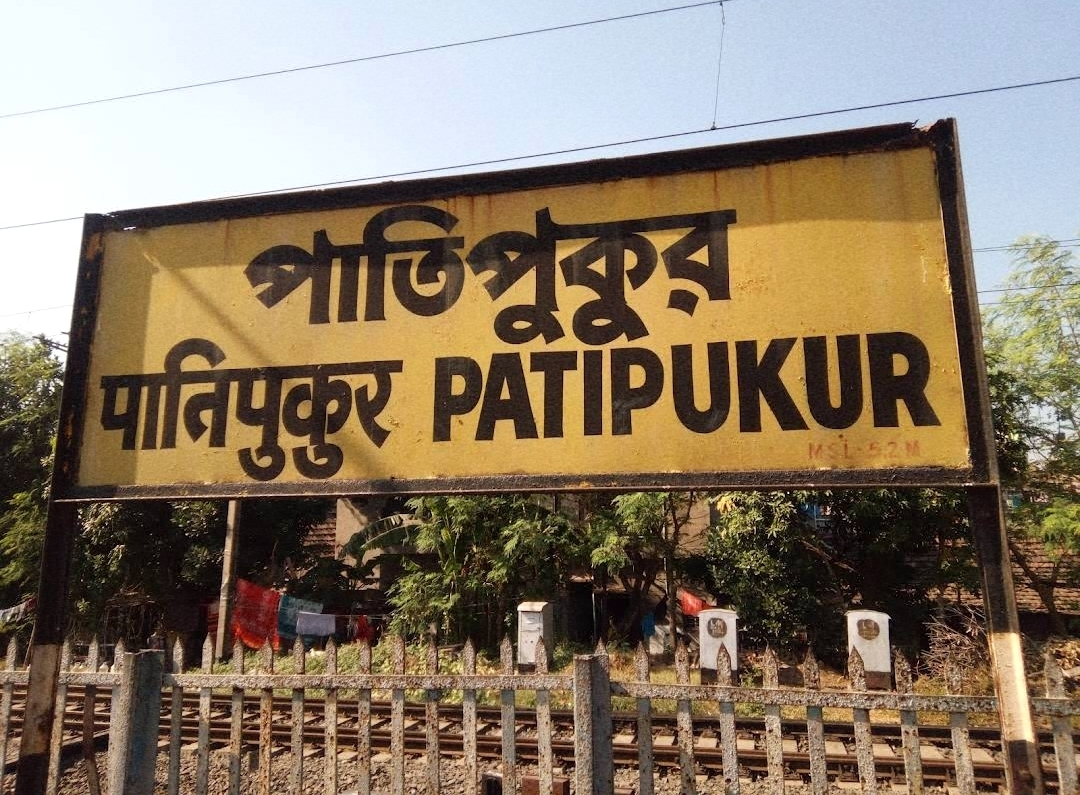

General information
- Location: Patipukur, South Dumdum, Kolkata, West Bengal 700048; India
- Coordinates: 22.606464°N 88.395262°E
- Elevation: 5 metres (16 ft)
- System: Kolkata Suburban Railway station
- Owner: Indian Railways
- Operator: Eastern Railway
- Platforms: 1
- Tracks: 3

Construction
- Structure type: At grade
- Parking: Not available
- Cycle facilities: Not available
- Accessible: Not available

Other information
- Status: Functioning
- Station code: PTKR
- Zone(s): Eastern Railway
- Division(s): Sealdah

History
- Opened: 1984; 42 years ago
- Electrified: 1984; 42 years ago
Services
Preceding station	Kolkata Suburban Railway	Following station
Dum Dum Junction Terminus	Circular Line	Kolkata towards Dum Dum Junction
Route map
Location

Patipukur railway station is a Kolkata Suburban Railway station in Patipukur. Its station code is PTKR. It serves the local areas of Patipukur in South Dumdum and Belgachia in Kolkata district. Only a few local trains halt here. It has only a single platform.

== The Station ==
=== Complex ===
The platform is not very well sheltered. The station lacks many facilities including water and sanitation. It is well connected to the Jessore Road. There is no proper approach road to this station.

== Connection ==
=== Bus ===
Bus route number 3C/1, 3C/2, 30C, 30D, 47B, 79B, 91, 91A, 93, 211A, 215/1, 219, 227, DN18, KB16, S160 (Mini), AC40, D11, D23 serve the station.

=== Metro ===
Belgachia metro station is the nearest metro station.

=== Air ===
Netaji Subhas Chandra Bose International Airport is connected via Jessore Rd; distance between Patipukur and the airport is 6.8 km.
