= South Dum Dum Municipality =

Indian local government

South Dum Dum Municipality দক্ষিণ দমদম পৌরসভা
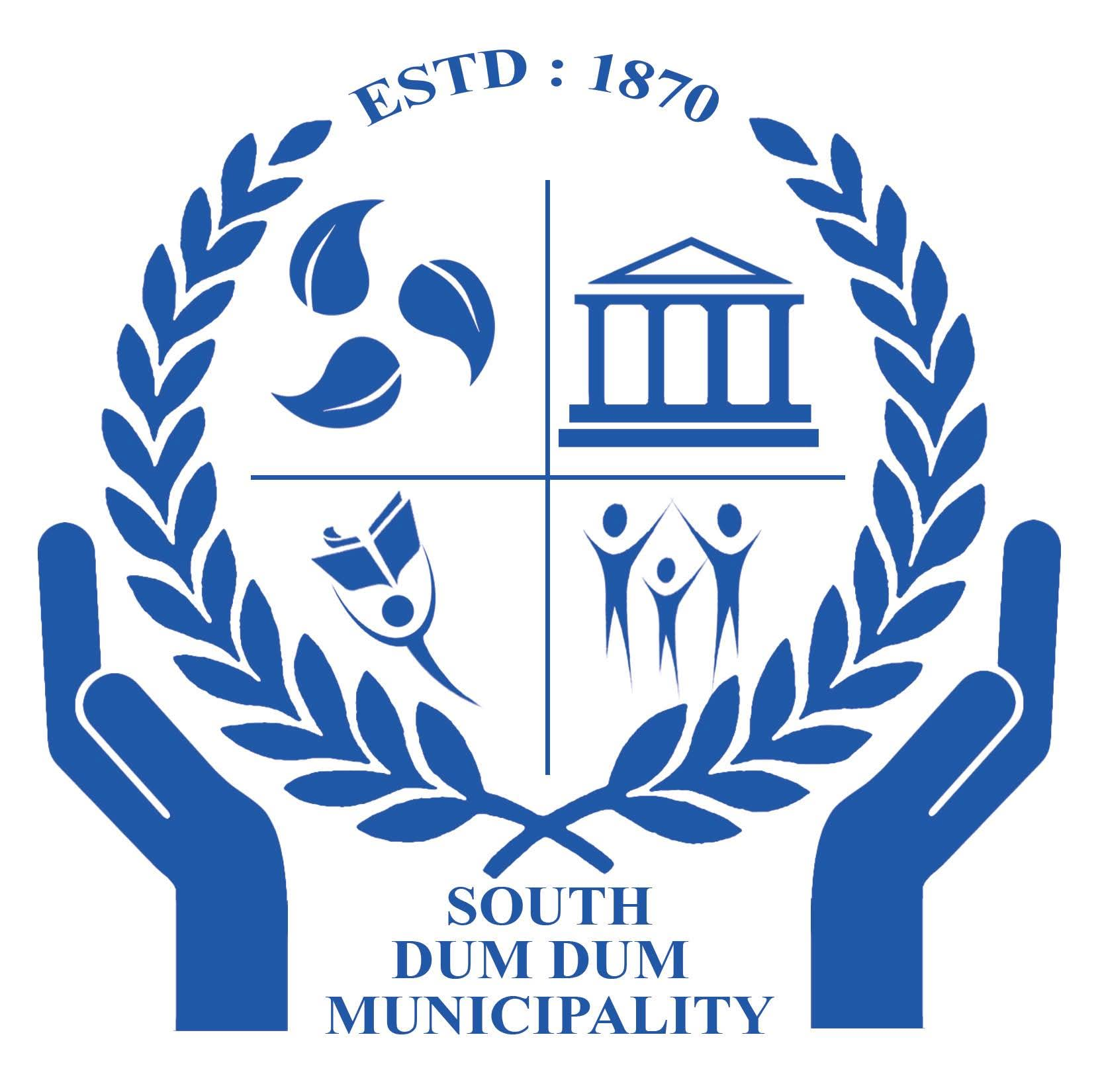
- Coat of Arms

Type
- Type: Municipality

History
- Founded: 1870; 156 years ago

Leadership
- Chairman: Smt. Kasturi Chowdhury (AITC)
- Vice Chairman: Sri Netai Dutta (AITC)

Structure
- Seats: 35
- Political groups: Government (35): AITC (33); IND (2)

Elections
- Last election: 2022
- Next election: 2027

Meeting place
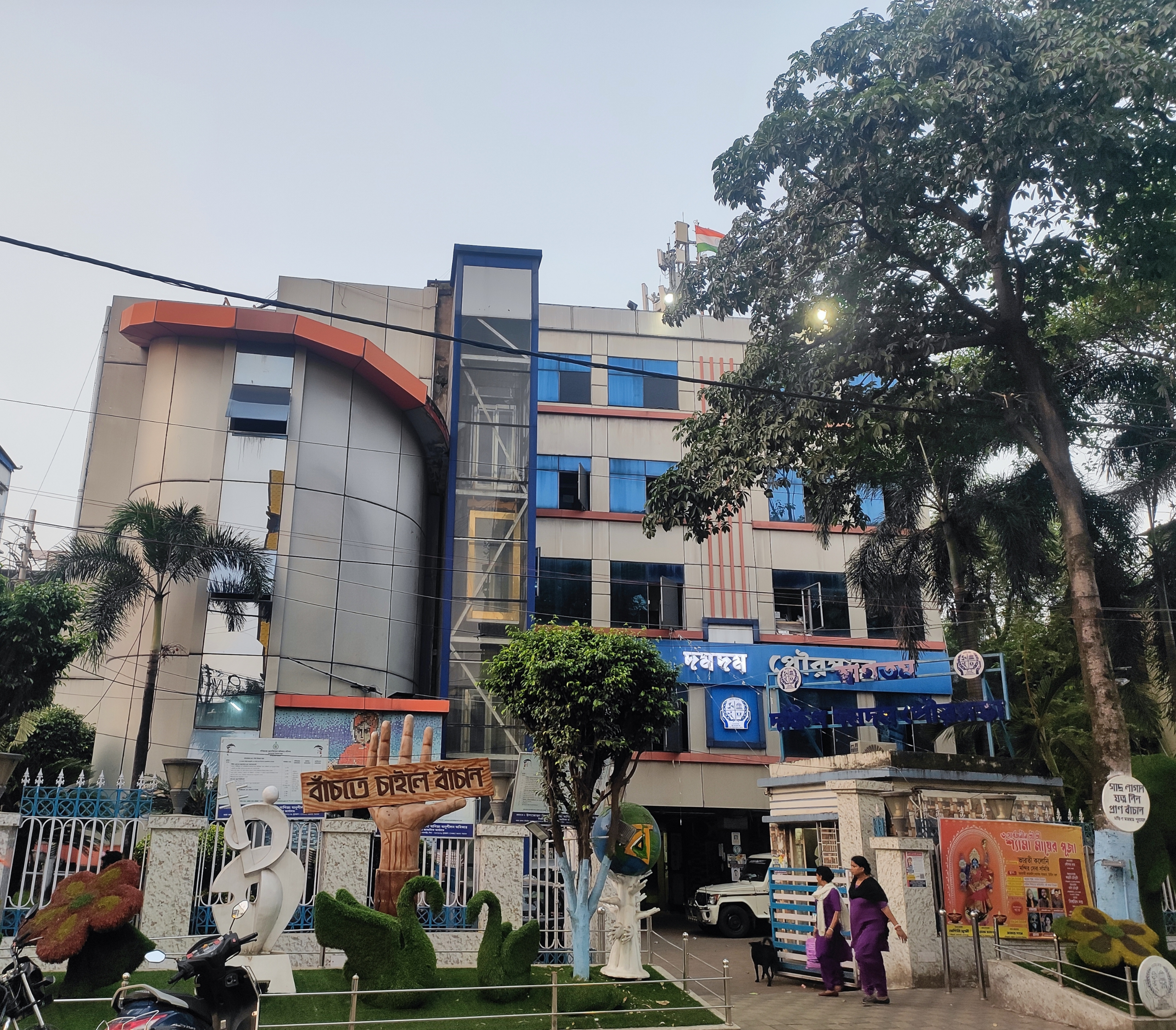

Website
- www.sddm.ind.in

South Dum Dum Municipality is the civic body that governs South Dumdum areas (Nagerbazar, Satgachi, Amarpalli, Motijheel, Laxminagar, Patipukur, Lake Town, Jawpur, Dum Dum Park, Purba Sinthee, Bediapara, Subhas Nagar, Rabindra Nagar and Mathkal) in the Barrackpore subdivision of North 24 Parganas district in West Bengal, India.

== Administration and Councillors ==
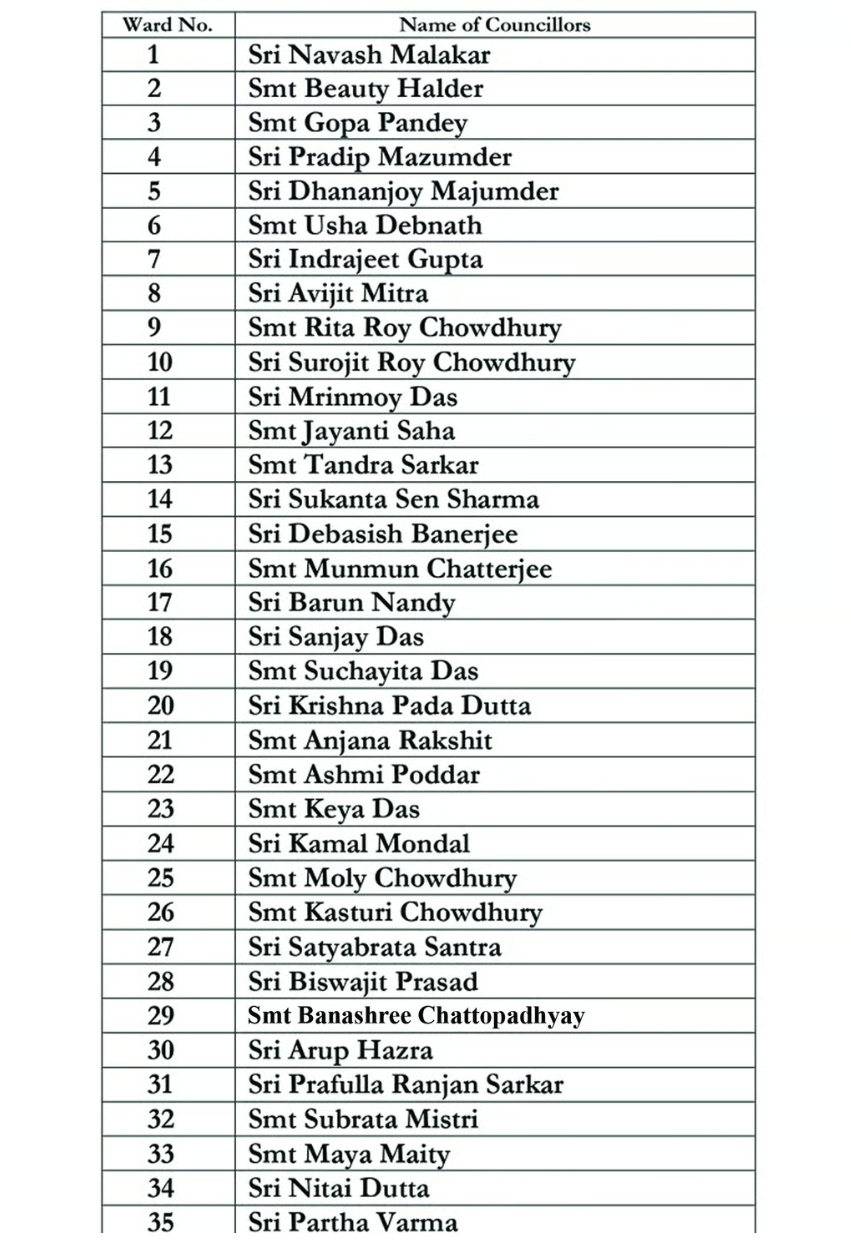
