= Dum Dum Road =

- Road in Kolkata (Calcutta)
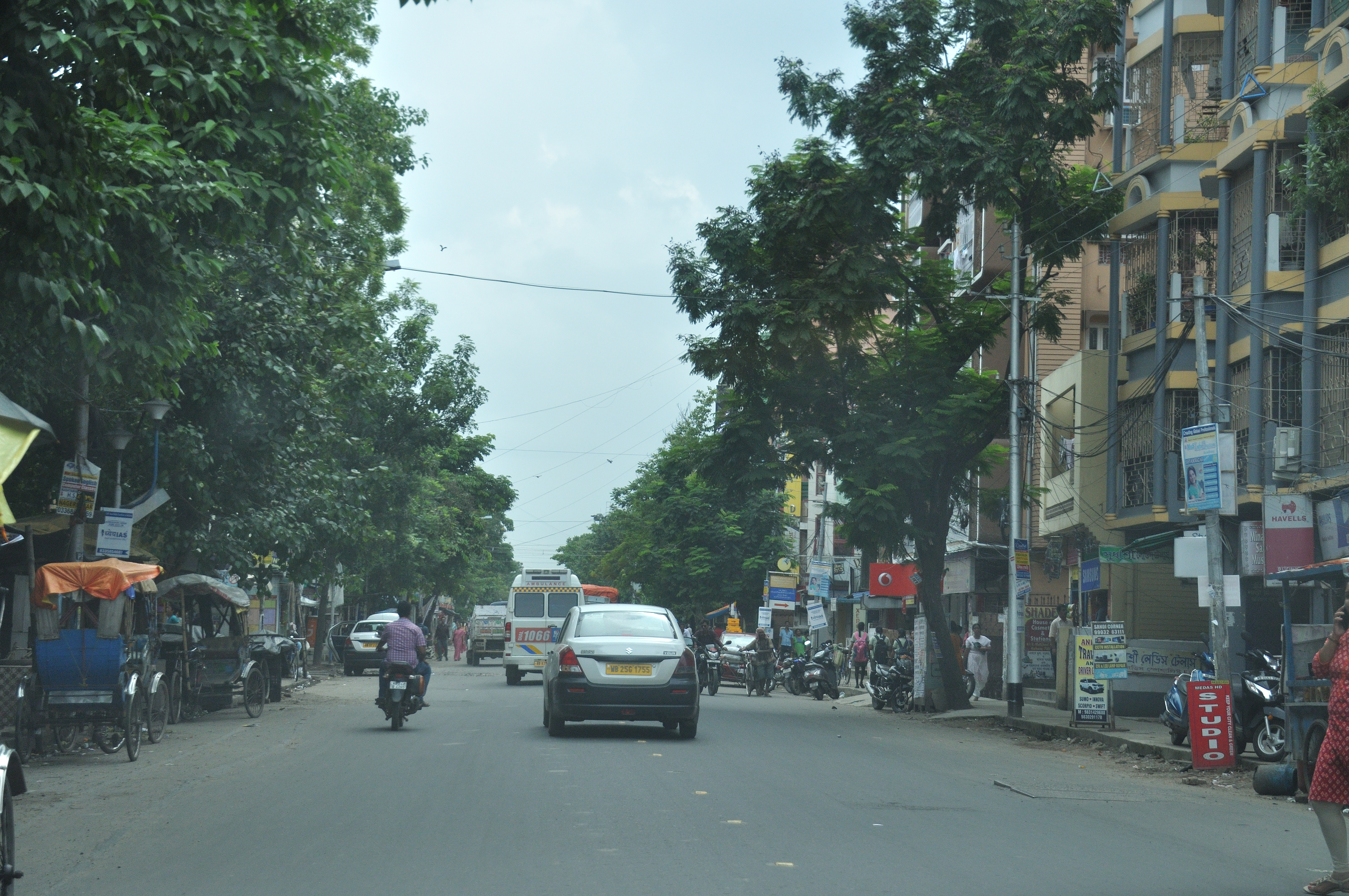
- Dum Dum Road

- Location in Kolkata
- Coordinates: 22.6188°N 88.3887°E
- Country: India
- State: West Bengal
- District: Kolkata
- City: Kolkata
- Metro Station: Dum Dum

Government
  - Body: Kolkata Municipal Corporation; South Dumdum Municipality
- PIN: 700030, 700074
- Planning agency: KMDA

Dum Dum Road runs through Kolkata and South Dumdum connecting Barrackpore Trunk Road near Chiriamore and Jessore Road near Nagerbazar.

== Landmarks ==
- Cossipore Club
- Dum Dum Road Govt. Sponsored High School for Girls
- Dum Dum Junction railway station
- Dum Dum Metro station
- St. Mary's Orphanage & Day School
- Indira Maidan
- Hanuman Mandir, Dum Dum Rd
- Private Road Crossing
- Dum Dum Motijheel Girls' High School
- Dum Dum Motijheel College
- Dum Dum Motijheel Rabindra Mahavidyalaya
- Dum Dum Kishore Bharati High School
- Nagerbazar Bus Terminus

== Transport ==
=== Bus ===
Many Buses ply on Dum Dum Rd are as follows:

- 202 (Nagerbazar - Science City)
- Nagerbazar - Howrah Mini (S-168)
- AC 38 (Dum Dum 11A - Karunamoyee)
- S10 (Airport - Nabanna)
- 30B (Gouripur - Babughat)
- DN-9/1 (Barasat - Dakshineswar)
- Nagerbazar - Dankuni Housing Bus
- Nagerbazar - Salap More Bus
- Rajchandrapur - Karunamoyee Bus
- D-39 (Seven Tanks - Howrah Stn.)
