= Dum Dum metro station =

Metro station in North 24 Parganas, WB, India

Dum Dum
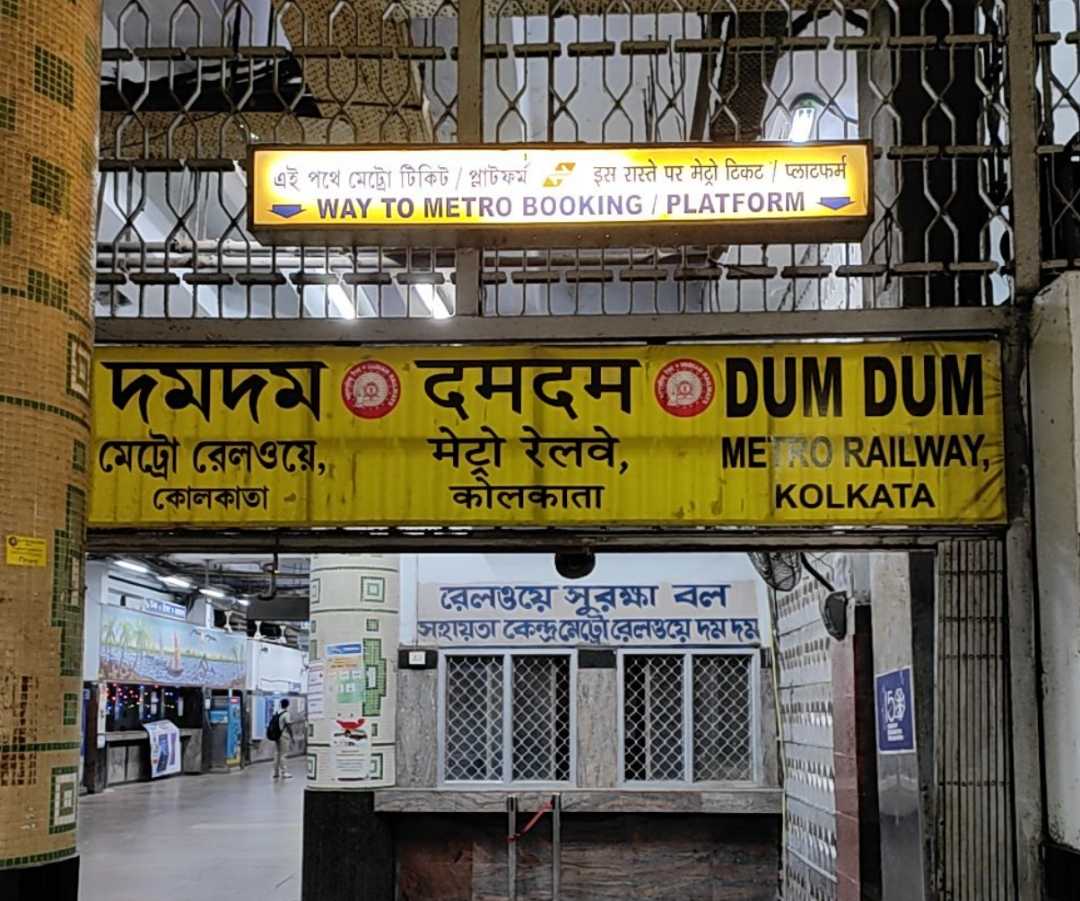
- Entrance of Dum Dum Metro

General information
- Location: Dum Dum Road; Kolkata, West Bengal 700030; India
- Coordinates: 22.621027°N 88.392818°E
- System: Kolkata Metro
- Operator: Metro Railway, Kolkata
- Line: Blue Line
- Platforms: 2 (2 side platforms)
- Connections: Dum Dum Junction: Eastern; Chord link; Circular

Construction
- Structure type: Elevated
- Parking: No
- Cycle facilities: No
- Accessible: Yes

Other information
- Status: Operational
- Station code: KDMI

History
- Opened: 12 November 1984; 41 years ago

Services
Preceding station	Kolkata Metro	Following station
Noapara towards Dakshineswar	Blue Line	Belgachia towards Shahid Khudiram
Route map
Location

Dum Dum is an elevated metro station on the North-South corridor of the Blue Line of Kolkata Metro in Kolkata, West Bengal, India. The metro station adjoins the platforms of the Dum Dum Junction railway station where connections can be made with Indian Railways services.

== History ==
The Kolkata Metro's Blue Line was built in stretches from time to time. The first section opened between Esplanade & Bhawanipore (now called Netaji Bhawan) in 1984 and the stretch was not connected to the Dum Dum Metro station. Metro service started from Dum Dum to Belgachia in parallel with the extension of the line to the south but the service was stopped due to lack of passengers. The stretch was very unpopular. Metro service from Dum Dum metro station restarted in 1994 connecting Shyambazar metro station. The service from Dum Dum metro station to Tollygunge station started in 1995. Dum Dum metro station was the terminal station in the northern end of the city before the Blue line was extended to Dakshineshwar metro station.

== Station layout ==
L2	Side platform, Doors will open on the left
L2	Platform 2	Train towards Shahid Khudiram (Belgachia) →
L2	Platform 1	← Train towards Dakshineswar (Noapara)
L2	Side platform, Doors will open on the left
L1	Mezannine	Fare control, station agent, Metro QR ticket vending machines, crossover
G	Street level	Exit/Entrance

=== Facilities ===
ATM is available.

== Connections ==
=== Auto ===
Autos services available towards Nagerbazar, 30A Bus Stand, Sinthee More, Milk Colony at Belgachia and Chiria More.

=== Bus ===
Bus route numbers 30B, 202, S-168 (Mini), S10, AC 38, D-39 etc. serve the station via Dum Dum Road.

=== Train ===
It is connected to Dum Dum Junction railway station, is the meeting point Sealdah–Ranaghat line, Sealdah–Bangaon line and Grand Chord Link Line of Kolkata Suburban Railway.

=== Air ===
This was (prior to commencement of commercial serives on the yellow line) the closest metro station to Netaji Subhas Chandra Bose International Airport and is connected via Dum Dum Road and Jessore Road.

== Entry/ Exit ==
North Gate and Main Gate on South Sinthee Road. Subway connections available from Platform No 1, 2, 3 and 4 of Dum Dum Junction railway station and Dum Dum Road.

South Gate leads to Dum Dum Road.

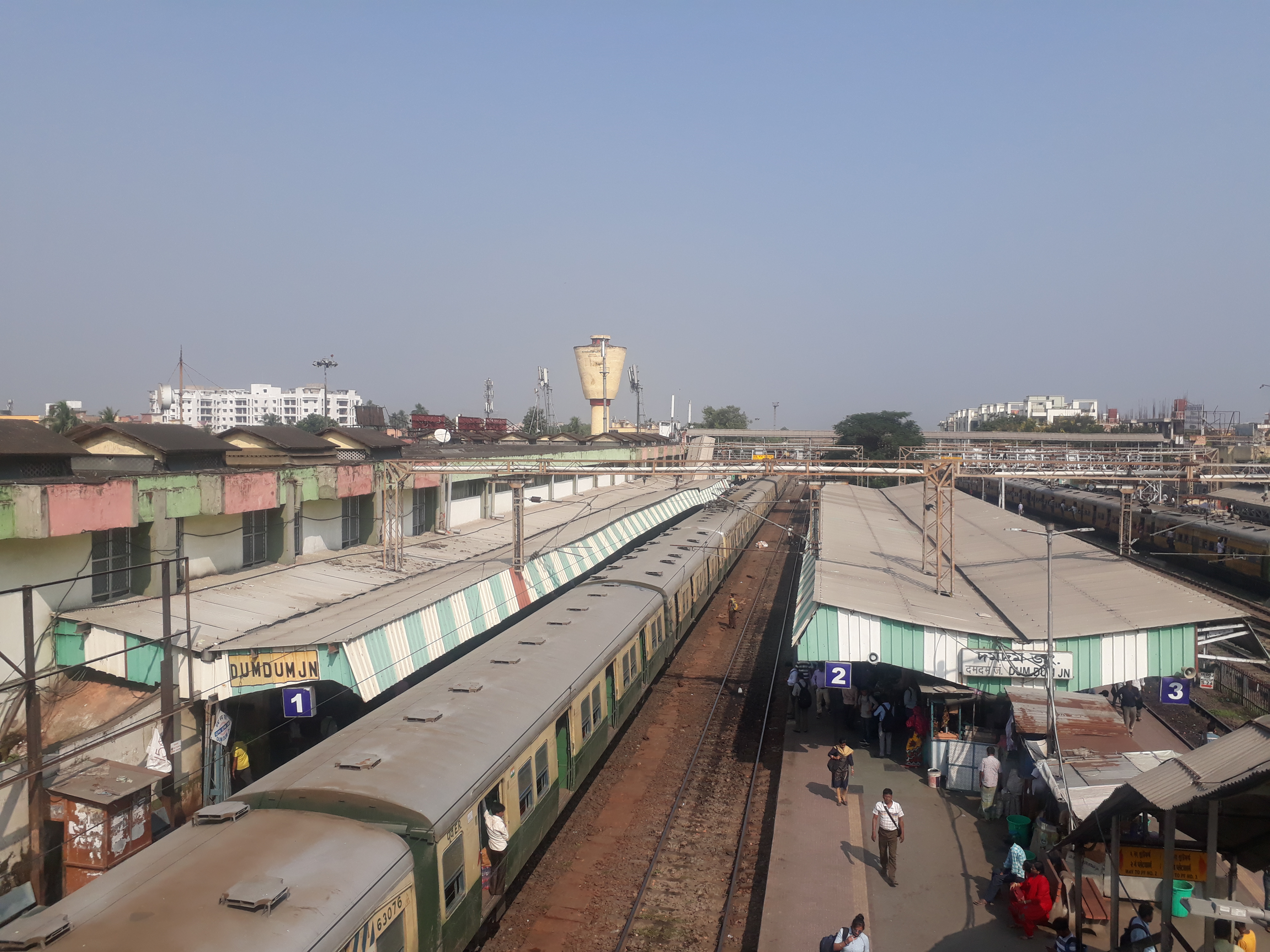
Dum Dum metro station (left) and railway station (right)

== See also ==
- Dum Dum Cantonment metro station
- List of Kolkata Metro stations
- Transport in Kolkata
- Kolkata Metro Rail Corporation
- Kolkata Suburban Railway
- Trams in Kolkata
- South Dum Dum
- List of rapid transit systems
- List of metro systems
