= Dum Dum Junction railway station =

Railway Junction Station in West Bengal, India

Dum Dum Junction
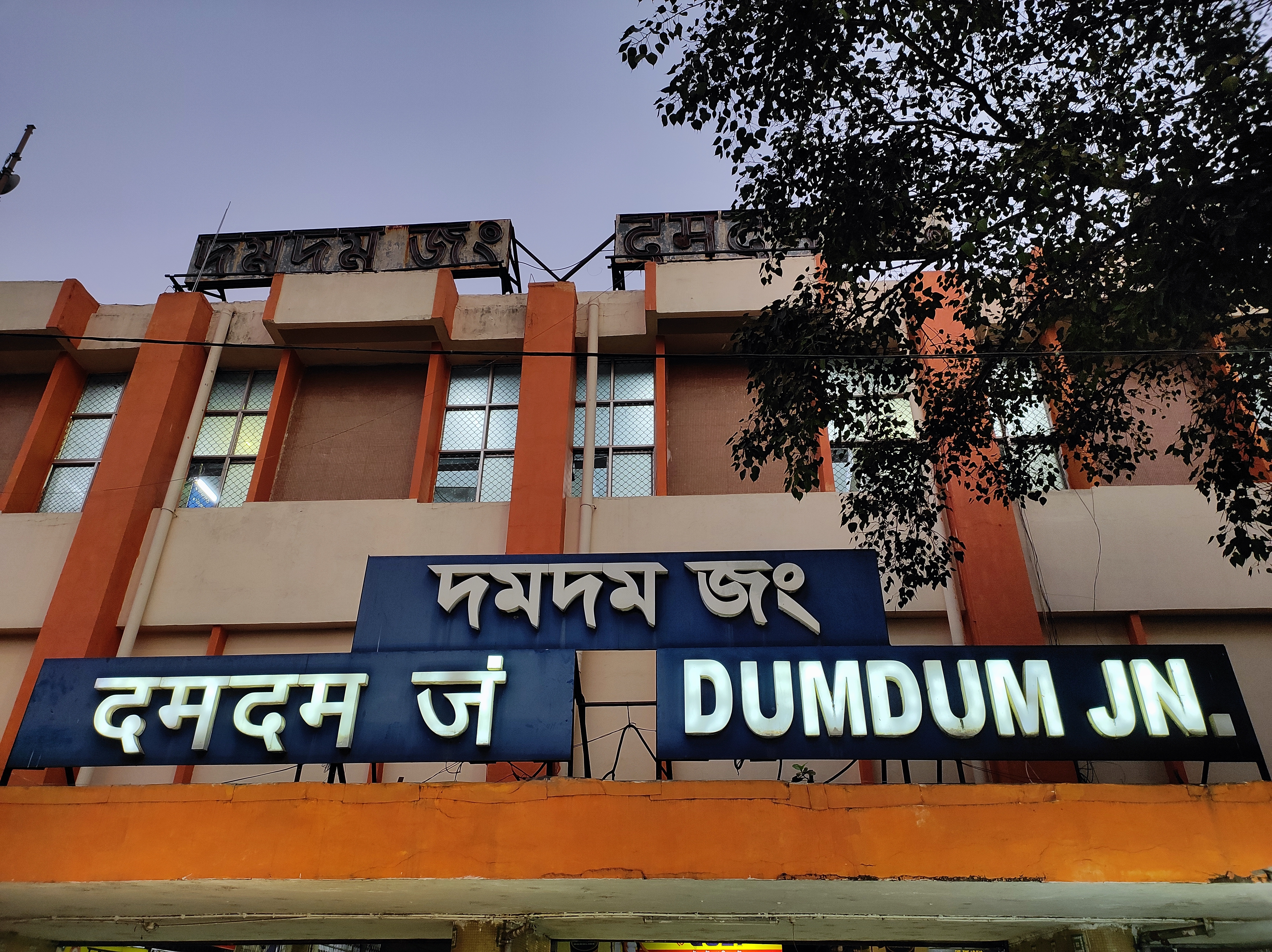
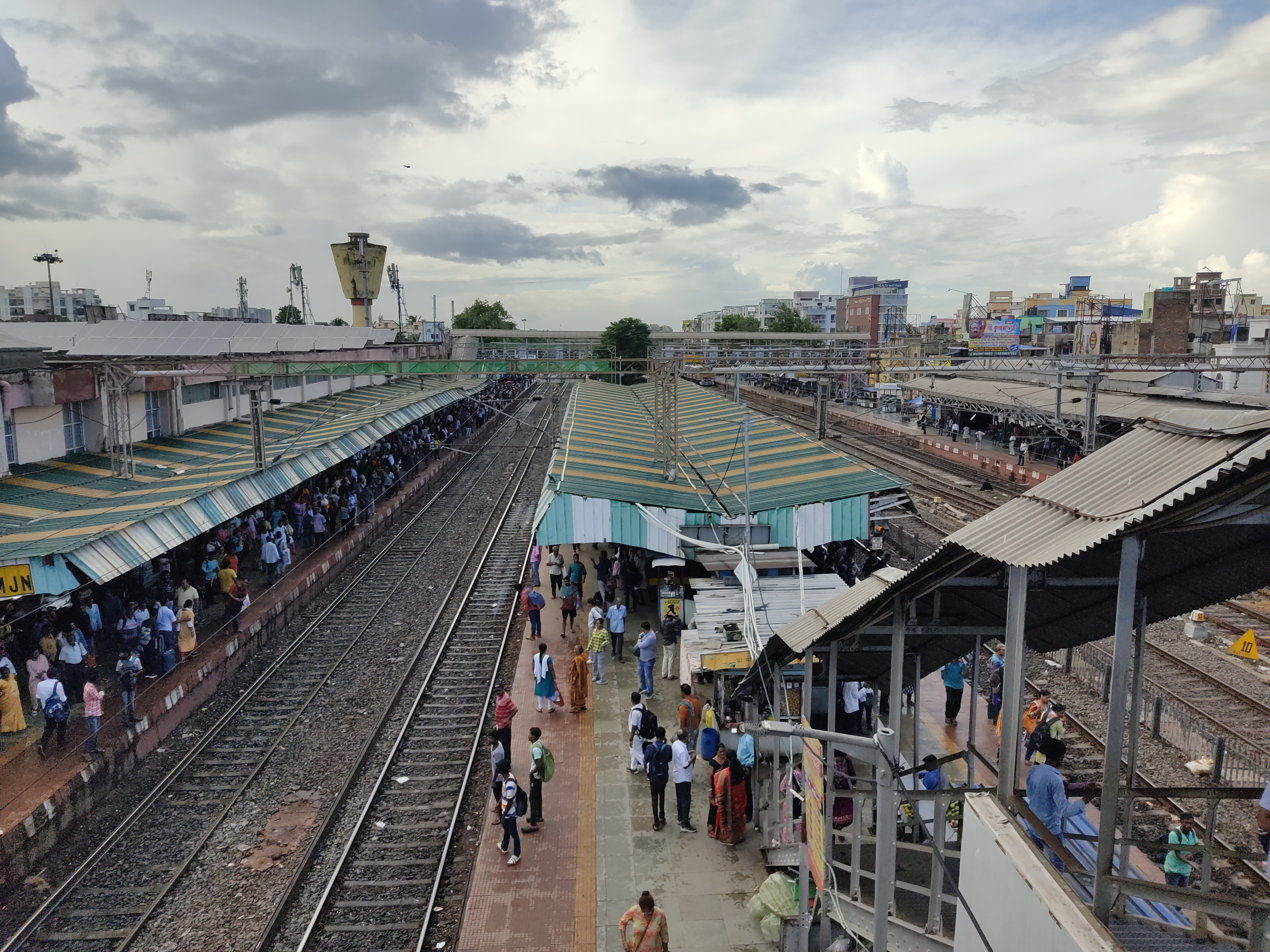

General information
- Location: Dum Dum Rd, Kolkata, West Bengal 700030; India
- Coordinates: 22°37′16″N 88°23′35″E
- Elevation: 9.61 metres (31.5 ft)
- System: Indian Railways; Kolkata Suburban Railway
- Owner: Indian Railways
- Operator: Eastern Railway
- Platforms: 5
- Tracks: 7
- Connections: Dum Dum

Construction
- Structure type: At grade
- Parking: Not available
- Cycle facilities: Available
- Accessible: Not available

Other information
- Status: Active
- Station code: DDJ
- Zone(s): Eastern Railway
- Division(s): Sealdah

History
- Opened: 1862; 164 years ago
- Electrified: 1963–1965; 61 years ago
- Former names: Eastern Bengal Railway
Services
Preceding station	Kolkata Suburban Railway	Following station
Bidhannagar Road towards Sealdah	Eastern Line Main line& Sealdah–Bangaon line	Belgharia towards Ranaghat Junction
Bidhannagar Road towards Sealdah	Eastern Line Main line& Sealdah–Bangaon line	Dum Dum Cantonment towards Bangaon Junction
Bidhannagar Road towards Sealdah	Chord link Line	Baranagar Road towards Dankuni Junction
Bidhannagar Road towards Dum Dum Junction	Circular Line	Patipukur towards Dum Dum Junction
Location

Dum Dum Junction (DDJ) is a Kolkata Suburban Railway junction station in Kolkata. Three lines branch out from Dum Dum in the north direction–the Kolkata Eastern line to Gede, the Calcutta chord line to Dankuni and the Sealdah–Hasnabad–Bangaon–Ranaghat line to Bangaon and Hasnabad. On the other hand, in the south direction, those three lines go towards Sealdah, while the Kolkata Circular Railway line arises from it towards Patipukur, and also ends to it through Bidhannagar Road after encircling the city of Kolkata through various important stations like Kolkata railway station and Majerhat. The Dum Dum metro station of the Blue Line is adjacent to Dum Dum Jn. railway station. It serves Sinthee, Cossipore, Nagerbazar and surrounding Dum Dum areas.

== History ==
The Calcutta Sealdah–Kusthia line of Eastern Bengal Railway was opened to traffic in 1862. Eastern Bengal Railway worked on the eastern side of the Hooghly River, which in those days there was no bridge.

In 1882–84 the Bengal Central Railway Company constructed two lines: one from Dum Dum to Khulna present day which is in Bangladesh, via Bangaon and the other linking Ranaghat and Bangaon. The Bengal Central Railway was formed in 1881 to construct and operate a line to Khulna. Later, it was merged with Eastern Bengal Railway in 1903.

The 33.06 km (21 mi) long 5 ft 6 in (1,676 mm) broad gauge line from Barasat to Hasnabad was constructed between 1957 and 1962. In 1932, the Calcutta Chord line was built over the Willingdon Bridge joining Dum Dum and Dankuni.

=== Redevelopment ===
In 2024, Ministry of Railways allocated ₹7.98 crore (US$830,000) for the redevelopment purpose of this station under the Amrit Bharat Station Scheme.

== Electrification ==
The Sealdah–Ranaghat line and the Dum Dum–Barasat–Ashok Nagar–Bangaon line were electrified in 1963–64. Further, the Dum Dum–Dankuni sector was electrified in 1964–65.

== Platforms ==
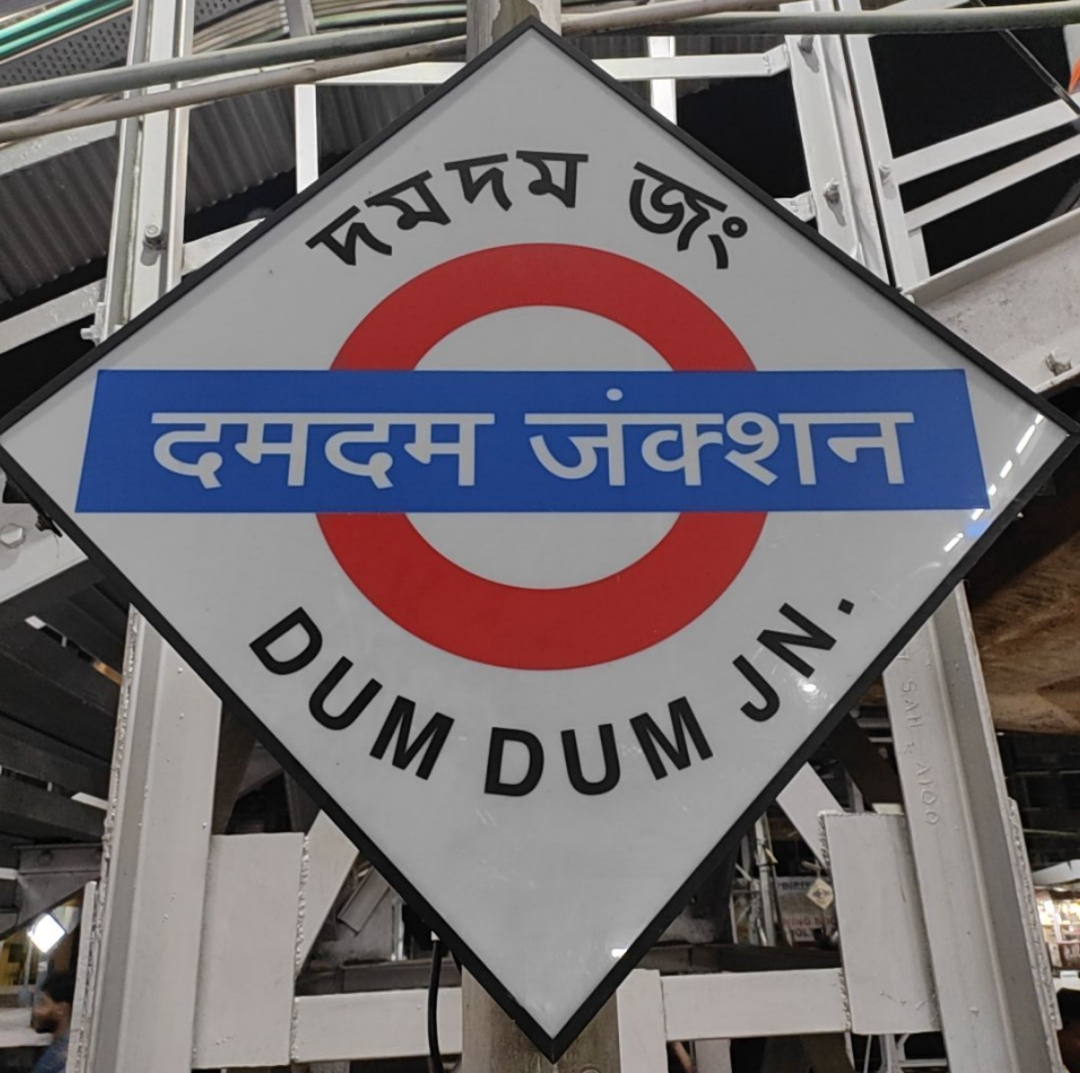

=== Platform 1 ===
Platform 1 mostly handles trains in the Up Sealdah Main Line sections. It also handles a few trains in the Up Sealdah-Dankuni chord line, Sealdah-Baruipara local, Sealdah-Bangaon section.

=== Platform 2 ===
Platform 2 only handles Down Sealdah bound trains in the Sealdah-Main Line section and almost all trains from Dankuni and Baruipara and a few from the Bangaon-Sealdah section.

=== Platform 3 ===
Platform 3 mostly handles Up train in the Sealdah-Dankuni chord line section, Sealdah-Baruipara local, the Sealdah-Bangaon section, Kolkata-Lalgola MEMU and Sealdah-Lalgola Passenger and MEMU trains. It also handles a few trains in the Up Sealdah-Main Line section and trains coming from Budge Budge, Majerhat through Ballygunge Junction.

=== Platform 4 ===
Platform 4 mostly handles trains in the Sealdah bound trains in the Bangaon-Sealdah section. It also handles a few Dankuni-Sealdah trains and also handles trains from Majerhat and Ballygunge through Princep Ghat joining the Sealdah-Main Line section(and sometimes the reverse route too) and down passengers trains coming from Lalgola.

=== Platform 5 ===
It mostly handles trains coming from or going to Princep Ghat, although Princep Ghat is not the terminus for trains passing through this platform. The Bangaon-Canning local also stops by this platform.

== Passengers ==
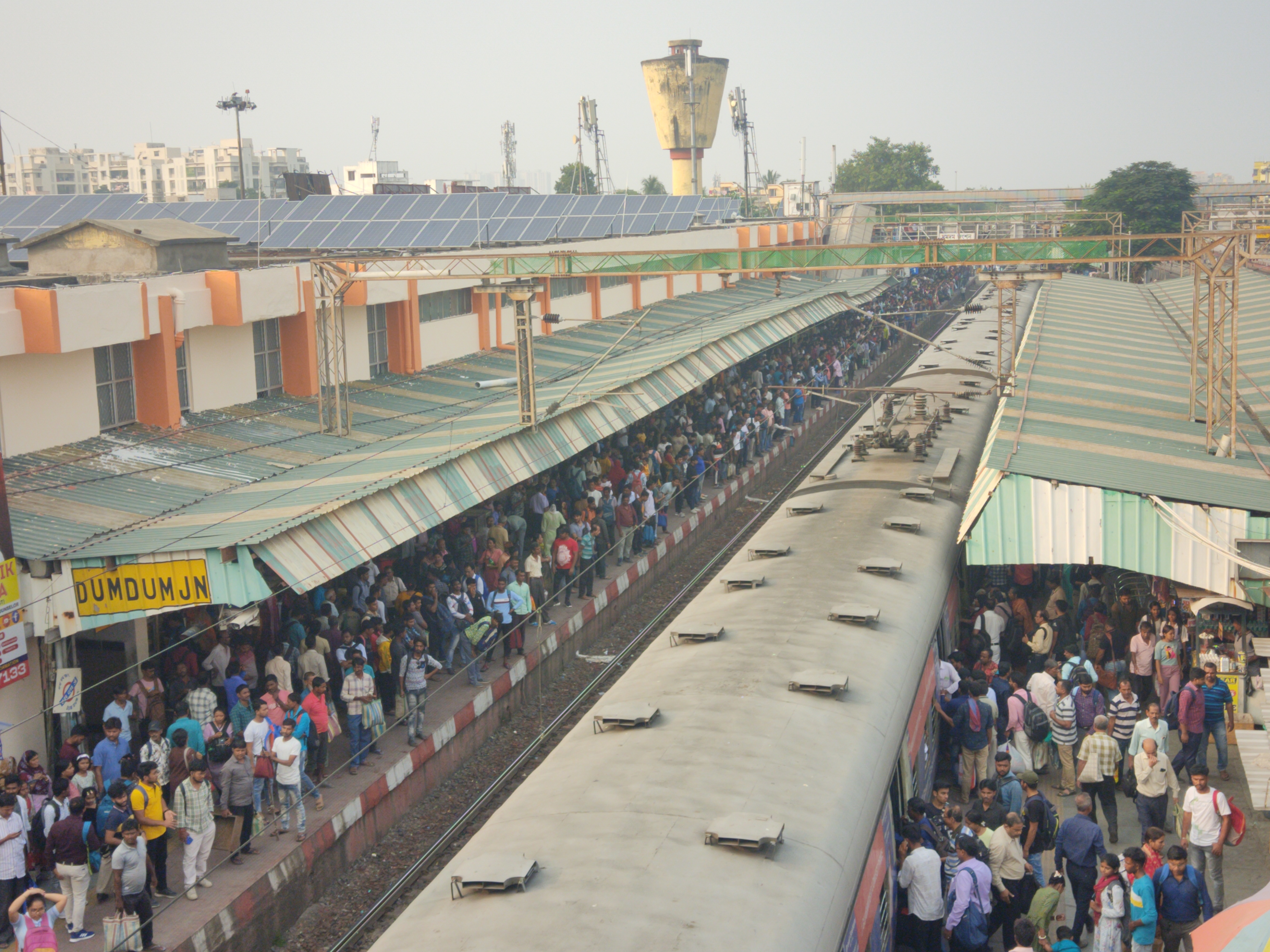

Dum Dum railway station handles 576,000 passengers daily.

== Connections ==
=== Train ===
Being an important railway junction station in the Sealdah Division of the Eastern Railways, Dum Dum Junction serves as an important halt to many long-distance trains including:

- Sealdah–Lalgola Passenger (Up 53171, 53175, 53179,53181, 63105 / Dn 53172, 53176, 53180, 53182, 53186, 63106)
- Sealdah-Jangipur Road Express (Up 13177/ Dn 13178)
- Sealdah–Godda MEMU (Up 63141 / Dn 63142) etc.

=== Metro ===
It is connected with Dum Dum metro station of Blue Line via subways.

=== Auto ===
Autos are available towards Nagerbazar, Chiriamore, Patipukur, 30A Bus stand, Sinthee More and RG Kar Hospital.

=== Buses ===
Bus route numbers AC 38, 30B, 202, DN-9/1, S-168 (Mini), S10, Nagerbazar - Dankuni, Nagerbazar - Salap, Rajchandrapur - Karunamoyee, Lake Town - Dankuni etc. serve the station via Dum Dum Road.

=== Air ===
Netaji Subhas Chandra Bose International Airport is connected via Dum Dum Rd and Jessore Rd; distance between Dumdum junction and the airport is 5.6 km.
