= Kolkata Metro rolling stock =

Rolling stock used in Kolkata Metro

The rolling stock of Kolkata Metro consists of five classes, three classes for Blue and Yellow Lines, one of which is also used for Purple and Orange Lines, and one class for Green Line.

All trains receive 750 V DC using third rail electrification system. Trains can operate up to eight (Blue, Purple, Orange and Yellow Lines) and six (Green Line) cars in length.

Since Kolkata Metro was constructed in 1970s, there were some technical limitations. Due to the tunnel dimensions, and being under Indian Railways, Kolkata Metro opted Indian metre gauge shell (22.7 m (74 ft 6 in)) with 1,676 mm (5 ft 6 in) tracks for Blue Line, which was later used for Purple, Orange and Yellow Lines. So the options of rake manufacturers for Blue, Purple, Orange and Yellow Lines are very limited. On the other hand, Green Line uses the 1,435 mm (4 ft 8 1/2 in) standard gauge tracks similar to most other Indian metro networks.

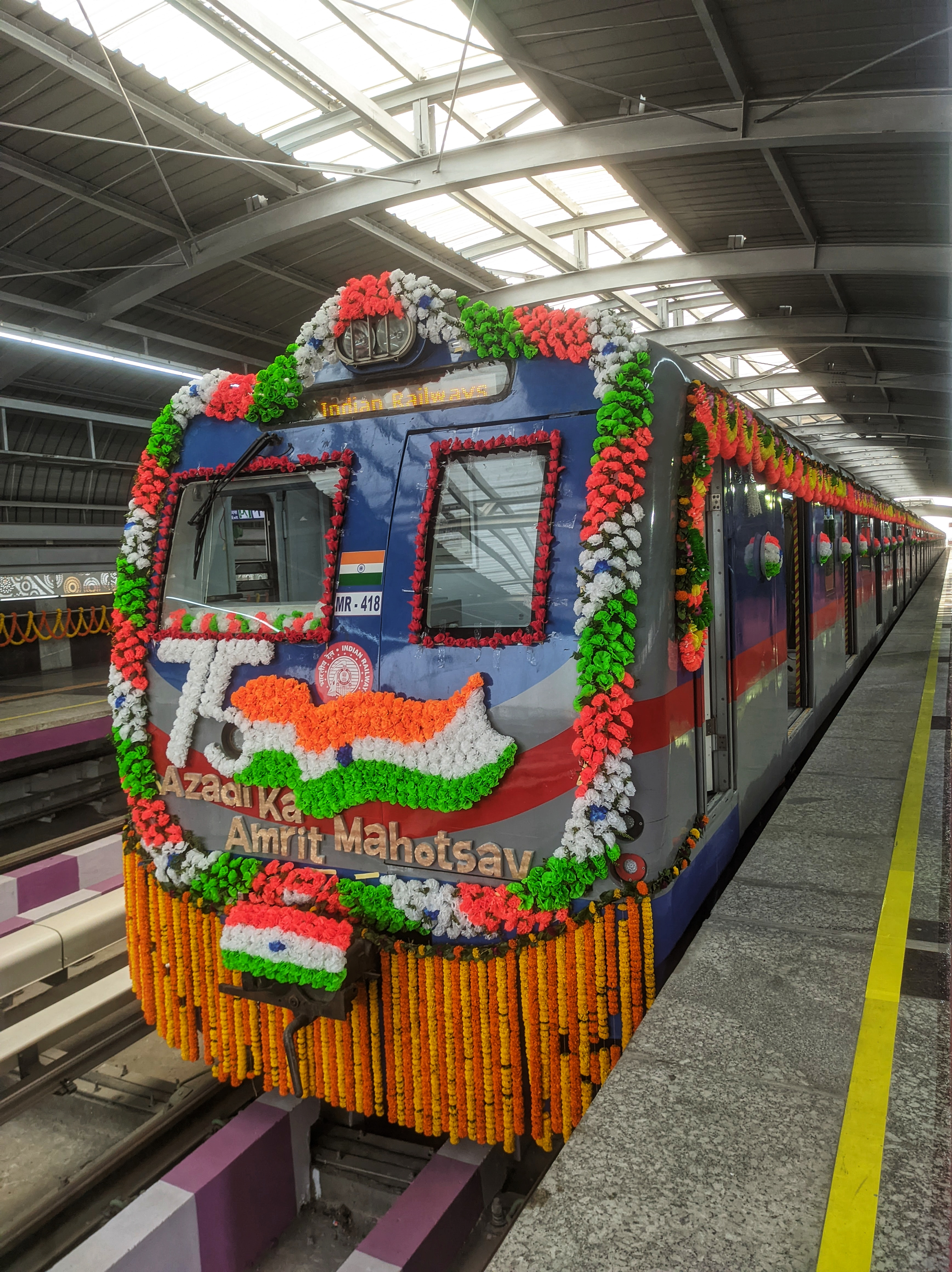
ICF MEDHA rake MR-418 During the Inauguration Day of Purple Line at Joka Metro Station

== Operational ==
=== ICF/BHEL rake ===
ICF/BHEL rake
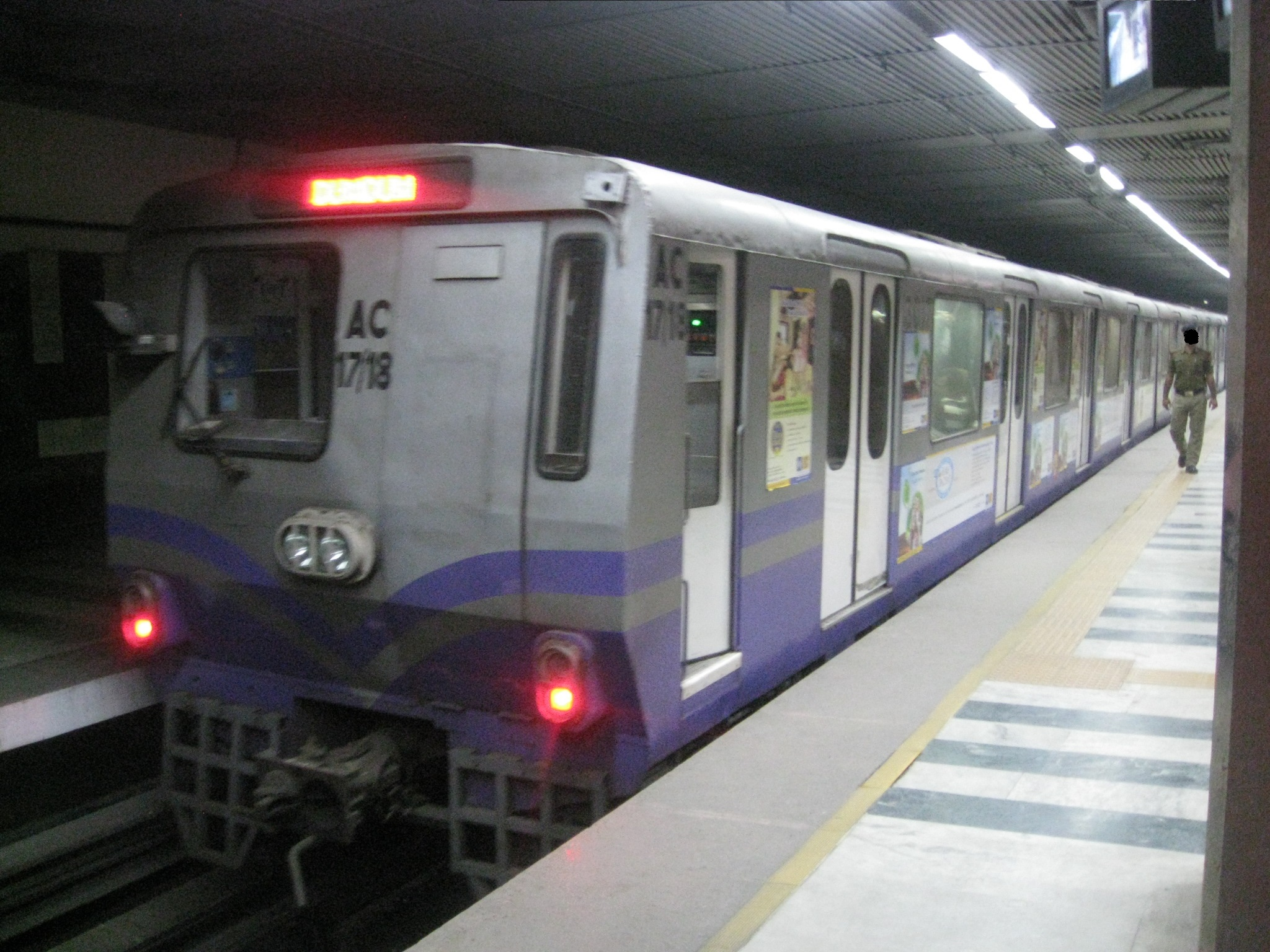
- In service: 2010–present
- Manufacturers: Bharat Heavy Electricals Limited, Integral Coach Factory and Knorr-Bremse
- Designer: Integral Coach Factory
- Assembly: Chennai
- Family name: ICF 3000 series
- Number built: 13
- Number in service: 13
- Successor: 4000 series
- Design code: Old: ACn/n+1; New: MR-30n
- Capacity: 3,136 passengers
- Operator: Metro Railway, Kolkata
- Depots: Noapara depot, Tollygunge depot and New Garia depot
- Lines served: Blue Line; Yellow Line

Specifications
- Doors: Sliding doors
- Power supply: 750 V DC
- HVAC: Air conditioned
- Electric system: Third rail
- Current collection: Contact shoe
- Bogies: ICF bogie
- Seating: Longitudinal facing seats
- Track gauge: 5 ft 6 in (1,676 mm) Indian gauge

These are the first AC trains that were passed into service in 2010, after the elevated corridor from Mahanayak Uttam Kumar to Kavi Nazrul was completed. Later, as the last extension from Kavi Nazrul to Kavi Subhash was finished, more 3000 series rakes were introduced. These trains are manufactured by ICF in collaboration with BHEL. Presently there are 13 (3000 series) rakes, which are operating on Blue Line. These rakes are numbed ACn/n+1 (where (n+1)/2 is the rake number). The rolling stocks numbers are now being changed to MR-30n (where n is the rake no.; 1, 2, 3....18) as they are being gradually repainted to white and violet. Some rakes are also used in Yellow Line.

=== ICF/MEDHA rake ===
ICF/MEDHA rake
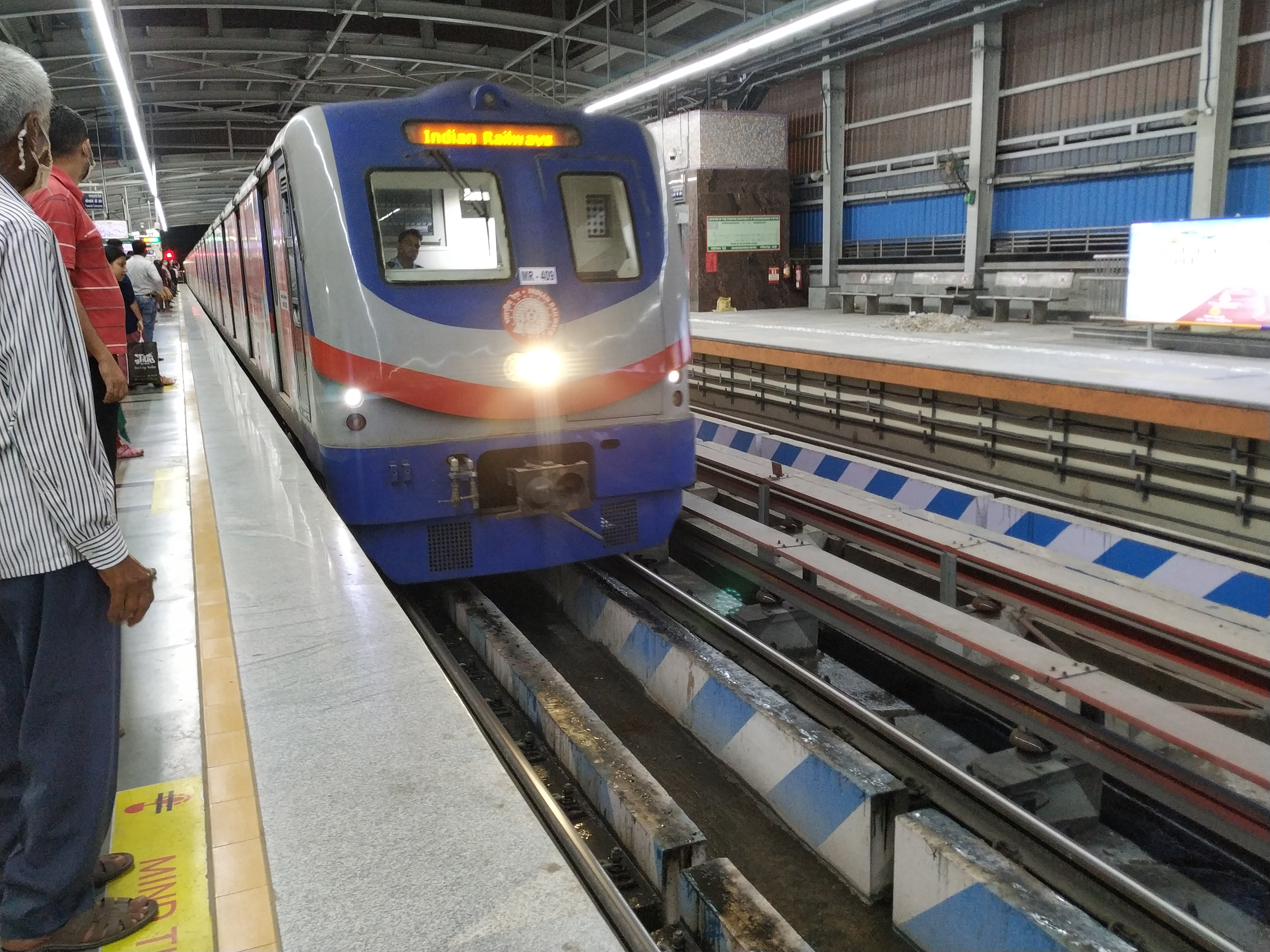
- MEDHA metro rake at Dakshineswar metro station
- In service: 2019–present
- Manufacturers: Integral Coach Factory and Medha Servo Drives Private Limited
- Designer: Integral Coach Factory
- Assembly: Chennai, India
- Family name: ICF 4000 series
- Number under construction: 1
- Number built: 18
- Number in service: 18
- Formation: 2DTC+4MC+2TC
- Design code: MR-40n
- Capacity: 3,520 passengers
- Lines served: Blue Line; Purple Line; Orange Line; Yellow Line

Specifications
- Car length: 19.5 m
- Width: 2.74 m
- Height: 3.625 m
- Doors: Sliding doors
- Maximum speed: 90 kmph
- Traction motors: 204 kW / 3 phase
- Power output: 3264 HP
- Acceleration: 0.85 m/s^{2}
- Deceleration: 1.1 m/s^{2}
- HVAC: Air conditioned
- Current collection: Contact shoe
- Bogies: ICF bogie
- Braking system: Regenerative braking
- Coupling system: Scharfenberg coupler
- Seating: Longitudinal facing seats
- Track gauge: 5 ft 6 in (1,676 mm) Indian gauge

2 prototype rakes manufactured by ICF Chennai and Medha and were supplied to Kolkata Metro by September 2017. These trains were extremely snagprone and Kolkata Metro officials took 2 years to fix the snags and to bring these trains into operation. Some of these trains were sent back to ICF during testing phase. These trains are completely different from existing AC trains made by ICF, BHEL, Knorr-Bremse. These trains have 3 phase alternating current motors, regenerative braking, stainless steel body, CCTV cameras (not present in rakes, numbered as MR-401 & MR-402), and better passenger information system. 14 rakes were delivered by April 2021.On 3 April 2019, the first ICF MEDHA rake ran between Noapara and New Garia, after 20 months. Gradually followed by 2 more rakes. After the initial hiccups these trains are praised by passengers for their comfort during braking and acceleration. Metro expressed satisfaction over the performance of the rakes as these rakes are more energy efficient. These rakes are numbed MR-40n (where n is the rake no.; 1, 2, 3....18). As of 2025, 18 such trains operate on Blue line. The last 3 trains of this type are compatible with both CBTC and the present DTG signalling system, although CBTC is not used on Blue line.

As of 2025, two sets of ICF MEDHA rakes with the rake numbers MR-417 and MR-418 have been brought to the Joka Depot and are currently operational on Purple Line.

As of 2025, two sets of ICF MEDHA rakes are also currently operational on Orange Line similar to Purple Line. Some rakes are also used in Yellow Line.

=== CRRC Dalian rake ===
CRRC Dalian rake
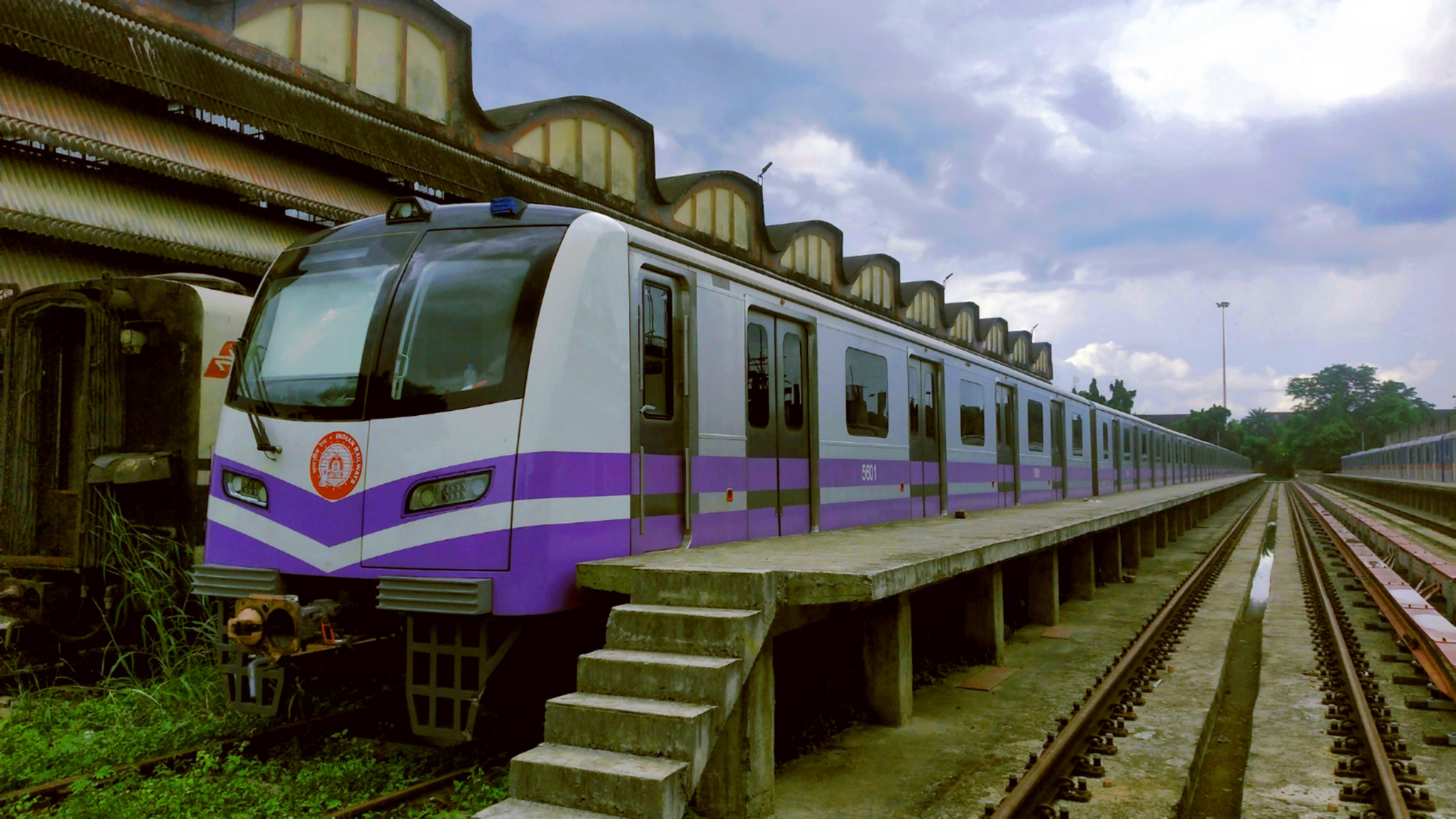
- The first rake at Noapara depot
- Manufacturer: China Railway Rolling Stock Corporation
- Assembly: Dalian, China
- Number built: 14
- Number in service: 11
- Design code: MR-50n
- Operator: Metro Railway, Kolkata
- Line served: Blue Line Yellow Line

Specifications
- Car length: 19.5 m
- Width: 2.74 m
- Height: 3.65 m
- Floor height: 1.13 m
- Wheel diameter: 860 mm
- Maximum speed: 80 kmph
- Axle load: 17 tons
- Power supply: 750 V DC
- HVAC: Air conditioned
- Electric system: Third rail
- Current collection: Contact shoe
- Seating: Longitudinal facing seats
- Track gauge: 5 ft 6 in (1,676 mm) Indian gauge

Notes/references
- Passenger operation Started on 17th march 2023

There was a need to replace non-AC rakes on Blue Line and so during mid 2015 it was announced that Indian Railways for the first time would rope an international train-maker, China Railway Rolling Stock Corporation (CRRC) based in Dalian. As per the tender, 14 rakes composed of 8 coaches each were to be supplied to Kolkata metro by CNR Dalian Locomotive company, a subsidiary of CRRC, which will be running on Blue Line. These rakes will be of ultra-modern technology. They will have doors that will be 20 cm (7.9 in) wider than any other metro rails in India. They will have wide vestibules, 2 feet 6 inches (0.76 m) wider than the existing trains. The design consists of the aerodynamic front with large doors and LED lights, and violet colored stripe on silver color body. These rakes are capable of a top speed of 80 km/h (50 mph). The first of the 14 rakes from Chinese firm Dalian was slated to arrive by December 2017 but got delayed due to various reasons. The first rake finally arrived in Kolkata on 3 March 2019 on a vessel at Netaji Subhas Dock (NSD). Each of the 8 coaches of the rake weigh nearly 45 tonnes. The rake was unloaded and taken to Noapara carshed after which trial runs and inspection would be carried out before commencing operations. Other 13 rakes are ready, but the shipment got delayed due to the ongoing coronavirus pandemic.

These rakes were under performance trials for more than 20 months as serious problems related to performance of the rake were identified during trials. Some of the issues related to insufficient power to climb up the slopes in the tunnels and higher oscillation in the bogie.

On 17th March 2023, the first Dalian rake was inducted into service. In August 2024, two more Dalian rakes were introduced on the Blue line - MR513 and MR514. Till August 2025, MR-504, MR-512, MR-507, MR-508, MR-509, MR-510 joined the fleet. MR-508 and MR-510 are specifically allotted for the Yellow Line.

=== BEML rake ===
BEML rake
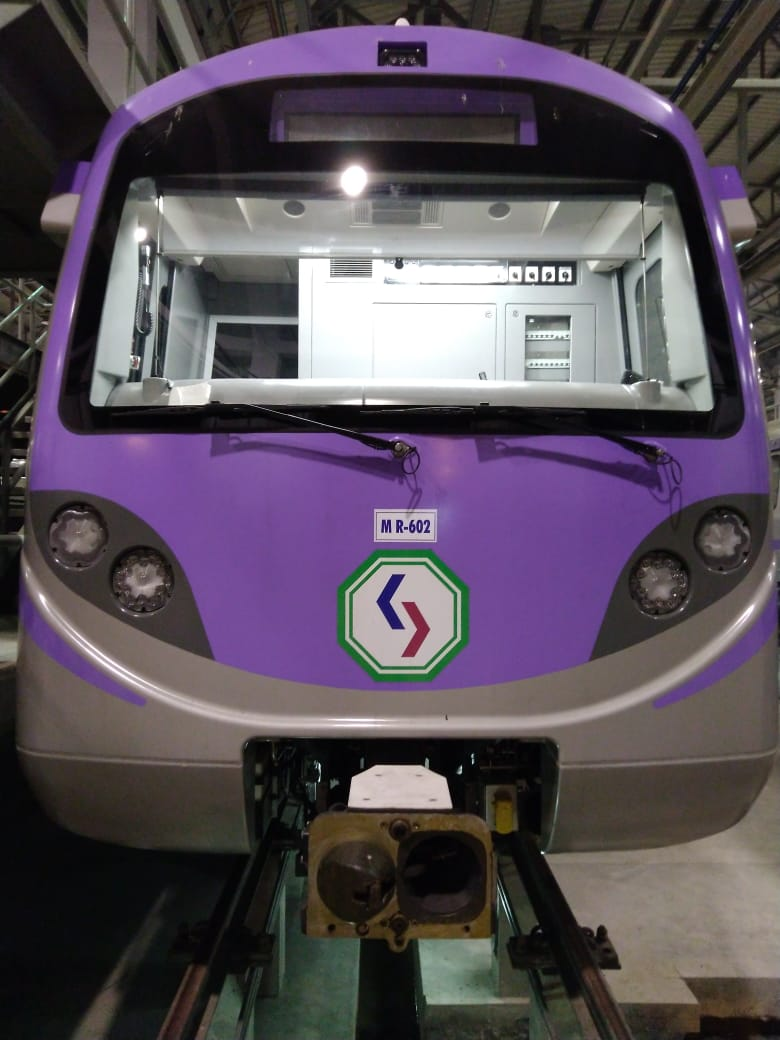
- In service: 2020–present
- Manufacturer: BEML Limited
- Designer: BEML Limited
- Assembly: Bengaluru
- Order no.: KMRCL/RS (3R)/2016
- Built at: BEML Limited
- Family name: BEML RS (3R)
- Constructed: 2016–2020
- Entered service: 2020–present
- Number in service: 17
- Formation: 2 DMC + 2 TC + 2 MC
- Design code: MR-60n
- Capacity: 2,002 passengers
- Operator: Metro Railway, Kolkata
- Depot: Central Park depot
- Line served: Green Line

Specifications
- Car body construction: Stainless steel
- Train length: 124.8 m
- Car length: 20 m
- Width: 2.88 m
- Height: 3.84 m
- Doors: Sliding doors
- Maximum speed: 95 kmph
- Power supply: 750 V DC
- HVAC: Air conditioned; Roof mounted ventilation
- Current collection: Contact shoe
- Braking systems: Regenerative and pneumatic brakes
- Headlight type: LED based
- Seating: Longitudinal facing seats
- Track gauge: 1,435 mm (4 ft 8 1/2 in) standard gauge

The bidding by the Spanish company CAF for Green Line was cancelled due to funding related problems. Re-bidding was done and BEML was given the contract for 14 rakes of 6 coaches each at a cost of ₹900 crore. Another 3 rakes were ordered in 2022, increasing the total to 17 rakes. The rakes are microprocessor controlled with 3 phase AC motors and CBTC system. The rakes were supplied to Kolkata from 2017. They are numbered MR-60n (where n is the rake no.; 1, 2, 3....17).

=== ICF/MEDHA rake ===
ICF/MEDHA rake
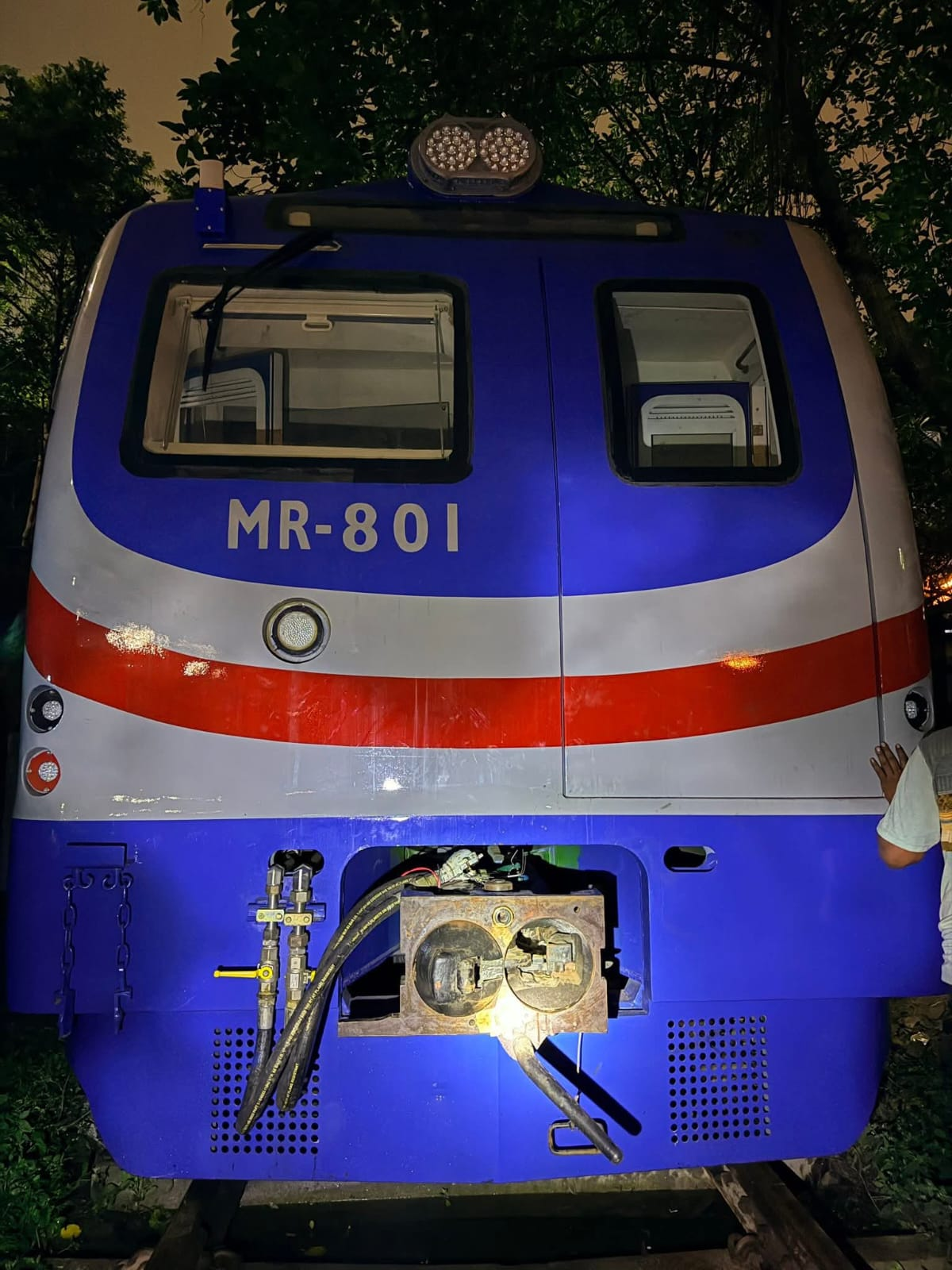
- MEDHA Metro Rake at Noapara Carshed
- In service: 202x–20xx
- Manufacturers: Integral Coach Factory and Medha Servo Drives Private Limited
- Designer: Integral Coach Factory
- Assembly: Chennai, India
- Family name: ICF 8000 series
- Number under construction: 1
- Number built: 20
- Number in service: 00
- Formation: 2DTC+4MC+2TC
- Design code: MR-80n
- Capacity: 3,520 passengers
- Lines served: Purple Line; Orange Line

Specifications
- Car length: 19.5 m
- Width: 2.74 m
- Height: 3.625 m
- Doors: Sliding doors
- Maximum speed: 90 kmph
- Traction motors: 204 kW / 3 phase
- Power output: 3264 HP
- Acceleration: 0.85 m/s^{2}
- Deceleration: 1.1 m/s^{2}
- HVAC: Air conditioned
- Current collection: Contact shoe
- Bogies: ICF bogie
- Braking system: Regenerative braking
- Coupling system: Scharfenberg coupler
- Seating: Longitudinal facing seats
- Track gauge: 5 ft 6 in (1,676 mm) Indian gauge

1 prototype rake and one new rake manufactured by ICF Chennai and Medha and were supplied to Kolkata Metro by February 2026. These trains were newly built and based upon CBTC System.Kolkata Metro officials suggested changes in 1st prototype rake which was MR - 801, to change the interior layout along with new stainless steel gates from MR - 803 onwards. These rakes are numbed MR-80n (where n is the rake no.; 1, 2, 3....20). As of 2026, 04 such trains arrived at Kolkata and on which 03 rakes especially (MR - 802, 803 & 804) are allotted to Purple line. These trains of this type are compatible with CBTC signalling system only.

== Scrapped or retired ==
=== ICF/BHEL rake (1984–2019) ===
ICF/BHEL rake
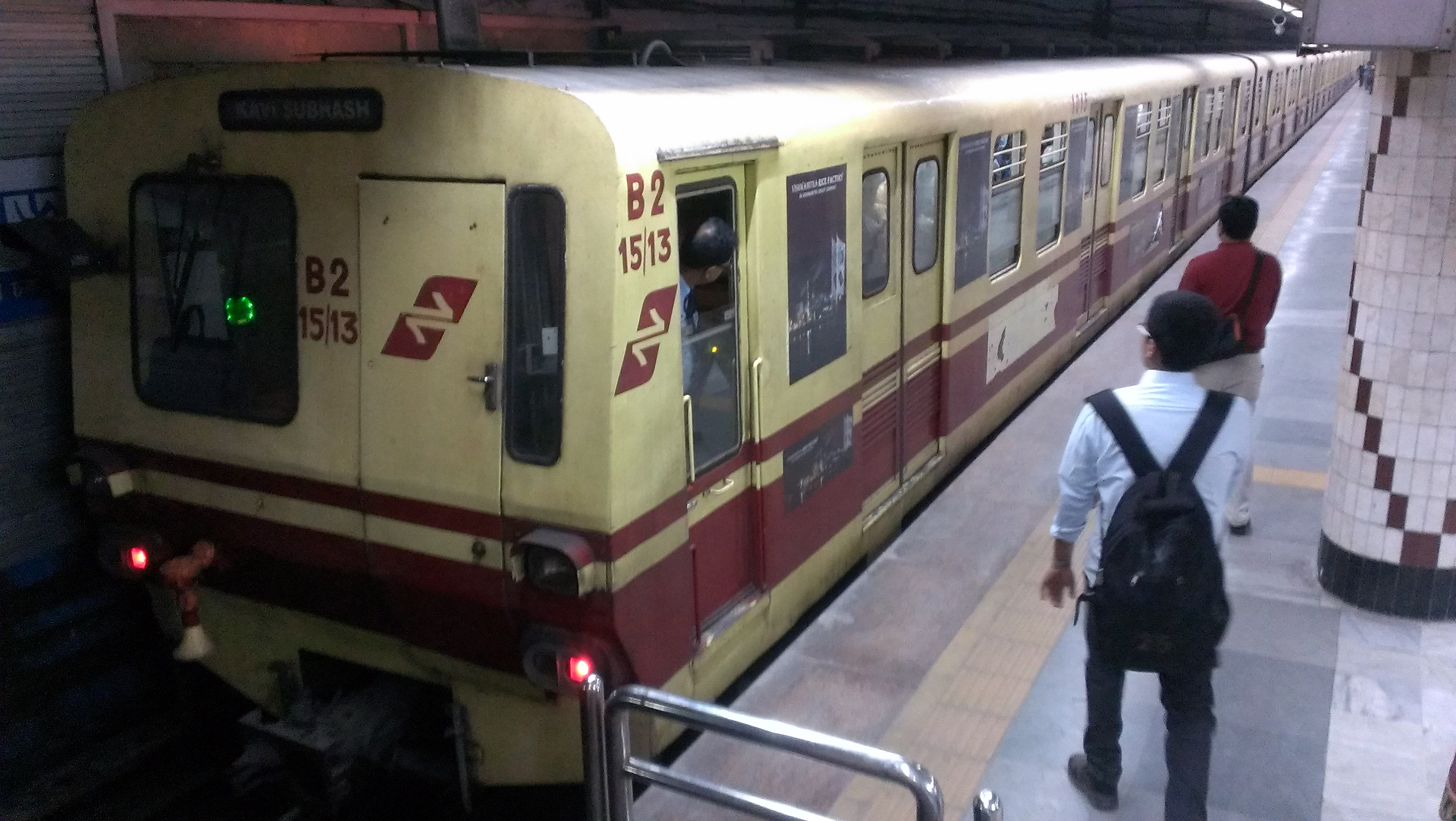
- In service: 1984–2019
- Manufacturers: Bharat Heavy Electricals Limited and Integral Coach Factory
- Designer: Integral Coach Factory
- Assembly: Chennai, India
- Built at: Integral Coach Factory
- Family name: ICF 1000 series
- Entered service: 1984–1988
- Number built: 9
- Number in service: 0
- Number preserved: 1
- Number scrapped: 8
- Successor: 3000 series
- Formation: 6 MC + 2 TC
- Design code: Bn
- Capacity: 2,400 passengers
- Operator: Metro Railway, Kolkata
- Depots: Noapara depot, Tollygunge depot and New Garia depot
- Line served: Blue Line

Specifications
- Train length: 156 m
- Car length: 19.5 m
- Width: 2.74 m
- Height: 3.7 m
- Doors: Sliding doors
- Maximum speed: 80 kmph
- Power output: 3036 HP
- Acceleration: 1.1 m/s^{2}
- Deceleration: 1.3 m/s^{2}
- Power supply: 750 V DC
- HVAC: Non AC, forced ventilation with washed and cooled air
- Electric system: Third rail
- Current collection: Contact shoe
- Bogies: ICF bogie
- Braking systems: Eddy current and electro-pneumatic brakes
- Seating: Longitudinal facing seats
- Track gauge: 5 ft 6 in (1,676 mm) Indian gauge

9 rakes were manufactured by Integral Coach Factory (ICF), Chennai and were passed into service in the first phase when the metro initially ran from Esplanade to Bhawanipur. These trains were yellow in colour and had a brown stripe at the bottom. Later the colour was changed to white with a maroon stripe. Lastly, they were yellow with a wide red band at the bottom. These rakes were numbed Bn (where n was the rake no.; 1, 2,...., 9)

=== ICF/NGEF rake (1988–2021) ===
ICF/NGEF rake
- In service: 1988–2021
- Manufacturers: NGEF and Integral Coach Factory
- Assembly: Chennai
- Family name: ICF 2000 series
- Entered service: 1988–1992
- Number built: 9
- Number in service: 0
- Number scrapped: 6
- Successor: 3000 series
- Formation: 6 MC + 2 TC
- Design code: 8N
- Capacity: 2,400 passengers
- Operator: Metro Railway, Kolkata
- Depots: Noapara depot, Tollygunge depot and New Garia depot
- Line served: Blue Line

Specifications
- Train length: 156 m
- Car length: 19.5 m
- Width: 2.74 m
- Doors: Sliding doors
- Wheel diameter: 860 mm (0.86 m)
- Wheelbase: 2.45 m
- Maximum speed: 80 kmph
- Axle load: 20.32 MT
- Traction motors: 566 kW
- Power output: 5221 HP
- Acceleration: 1.1 m/s^{2}
- Deceleration: 1.3 m/s^{2}
- Power supply: 750 V DC
- HVAC: Non AC, forced ventilation with washed and cooled air
- Electric system: Third rail
- Current collection: Contact shoe
- Bogies: ICF bogie
- Braking systems: Eddy current and electro-pneumatic brakes
- Seating: Longitudinal facing seats
- Track gauge: 5 ft 6 in (1,676 mm) Indian gauge

By 1988–90, 9 more rakes manufactured by ICF were procured and put in service when the system expanded. These rakes were tougher and had higher acceleration than the previous ones. The colors of these trains were dark green with a yellow stripe at the bottom, later they were repainted in white with a blue stripe and lastly, they were sky blue with a deep blue band at the bottom. In 2017–18, these were refurbished and put into service in a phased manner. In 2021, the rakes were scrapped. However, later in 2022, 2 rakes were used for trial runs on Purple and Orange Lines and one motor car is kept at Howrah rail museum. The rakes were marked with 8N symbols.
