= Mathkal =

- Neighbourhood
- Matkal
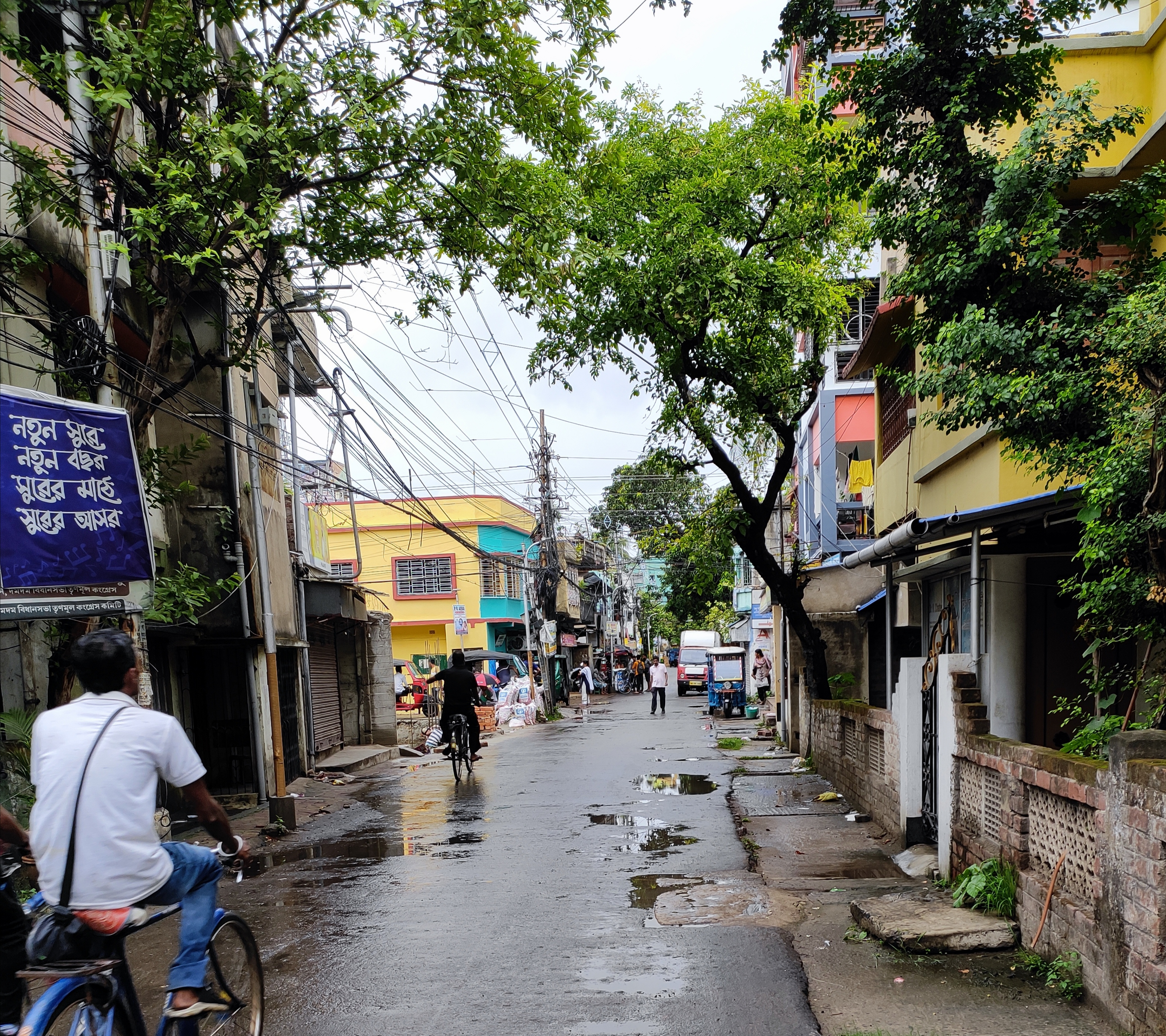
- Vivekananda Rd, Mathkal

- Location in Kolkata Mathkal (West Bengal) Mathkal (India)
- Coordinates: 22.6458°N 88.4063°E
- Country: India
- State: West Bengal
- Division: Presidency
- District: North 24 Parganas
- Metro Station: Noapara; Dum Dum Cantonment
- Railway Station: Dum Dum Cantonment

Government
  - Type: Municipality
  - Body: South Dumdum Municipality

Languages
  - Official: Bengali, English
- Time zone: UTC+5:30 (IST)
- PIN: 700065
- Telephone code: +91 33
- Vehicle registration: WB
- Lok Sabha constituency: Dum Dum
- Vidhan Sabha constituency: Dum Dum

Mathkal or Matkal is a neighbourhood in South Dumdum of North 24 Parganas district in the Indian state of West Bengal. It is a part of the area covered by Kolkata Metropolitan Development Authority (KMDA). Localities within Matkal are Sukanta Pally, Surya Sen Pally and Vivekananda Pally.

== Geography ==
=== Post Office ===
Rabindra Nagar has a delivery sub post office, with PIN 700065 in the Kolkata North Division of Kolkata district in Calcutta region. Other post office with the same PIN is Subhas Nagar and Health Institute.

=== Police station ===
Dum Dum police station under Barrackpore Police Commissionerate has jurisdiction over Mathkal areas.

== Transport ==
=== Railways ===
Dum Dum Cantonment railway station on the Sealdah-Bangaon line is the nearest railway station.

=== Metro ===
Noapara metro station of Blue Line and Dum Dum Cantonment metro station of Yellow Line are the nearest metro stations.

=== Bus ===
Buses ply along Belghoria Expressway are:

==== WBTC Bus ====
- AC23A Rajchandrapur - Salt Lake Karunamoyee
- AC50A Rajchandrapur - Garia 6 no. Bus stand
- ACT-23 Park Circus - Dankuni
- C23 Park Circus - Dankuni
- S23A Rajchandrapur - Salt Lake Karunamoyee

==== Private Bus ====
- 285 Serampore - Salt Lake Sector-V
- DN2/1 Dakshineswar - New Town
- DN9/1 Barasat - Rajchandrapur
- DN44 Dakshineswar - Bangaon
- DN46 Dankuni Housing - Salt Lake Karunamoyee

Many unnumbered shuttle buses also pass through Mathkal along Belghoria Expy.

== Markets ==
Markets in or near Mathkal area are:

- Shibtala Bazar
- Promodnagar Market
- Natun Bazar Market
