= Gorabazar, Dum Dum =

Gora Bazar
- Neighbourhood
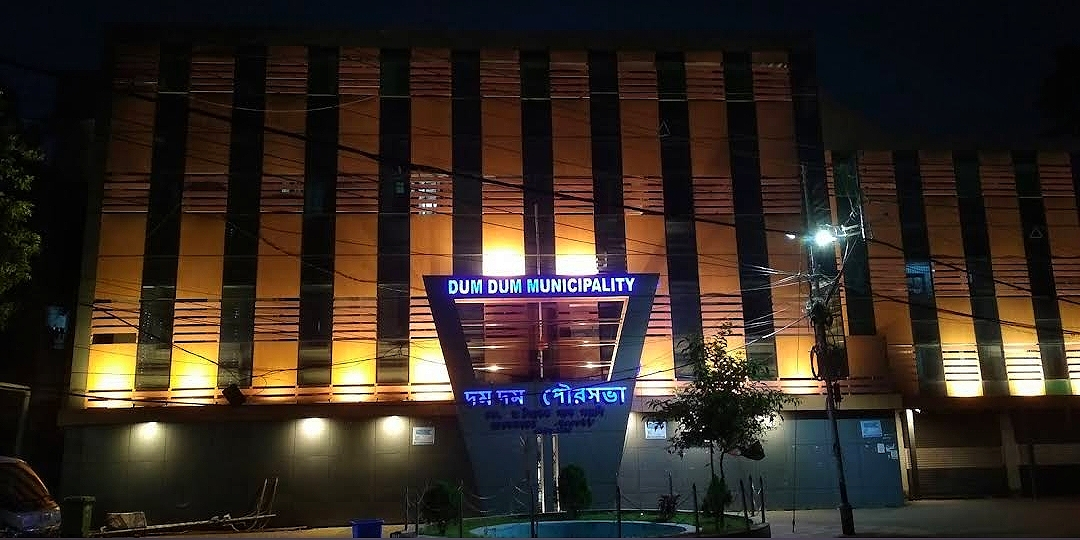
- Dum Dum Municipal Headquarters

- Location in Kolkata Gora Bazar (West Bengal) Gora Bazar (India)
- Coordinates: 22.6352°N 88.4143°E
- Country: India
- State: West Bengal
- Division: Presidency
- District: North 24 Parganas
- Metro Station: Dum Dum Cantonment
- Railway Station: Dum Dum Cantonment

Government
  - Type: Municipality
  - Body: Dum Dum Municipality

Languages
  - Official: Bengali, English
- Time zone: UTC+5:30 (IST)
- PIN: 700028
- Telephone code: +91 33
- Vehicle registration: WB
- Lok Sabha constituency: Dum Dum
- Vidhan Sabha constituency: Dum Dum

Gora Bazar is a neighbourhood in Dum Dum of North 24 Parganas district in the Indian state of West Bengal. It is one of the largest markets in the Dum Dum Cantonment area. It is a part of the area covered by Kolkata Metropolitan Development Authority (KMDA).

== Geography ==
=== Post Office ===
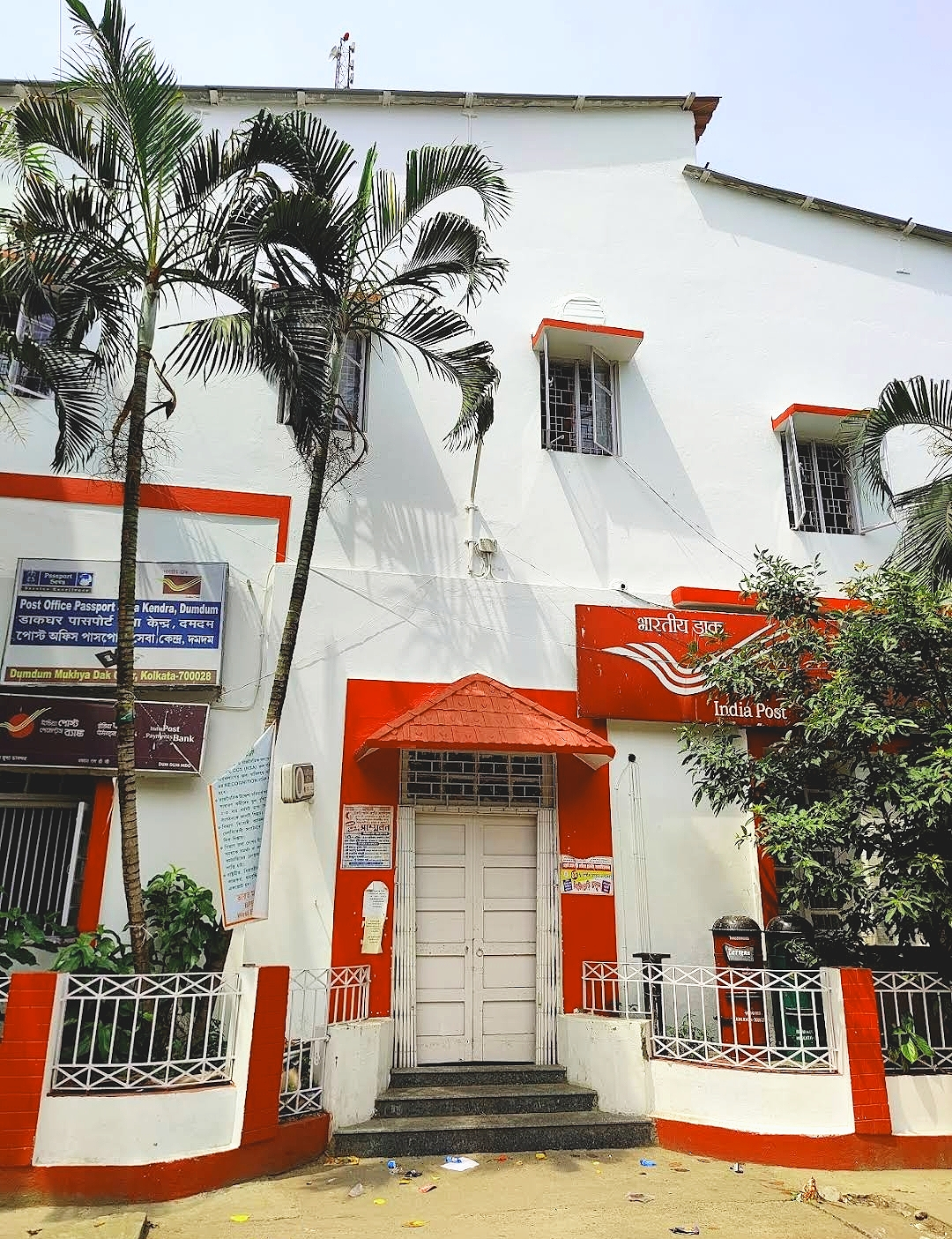
Dum Dum Head Post Office and Passport Seva Kendra

Dum Dum has a delivery Head post office, with PIN 700028 in the Kolkata North Division of Kolkata district in Calcutta region. Other post offices with the same PIN are Ordnance Factory, Kumarpara, Kamalapur and Rajabagan.

=== Police station ===
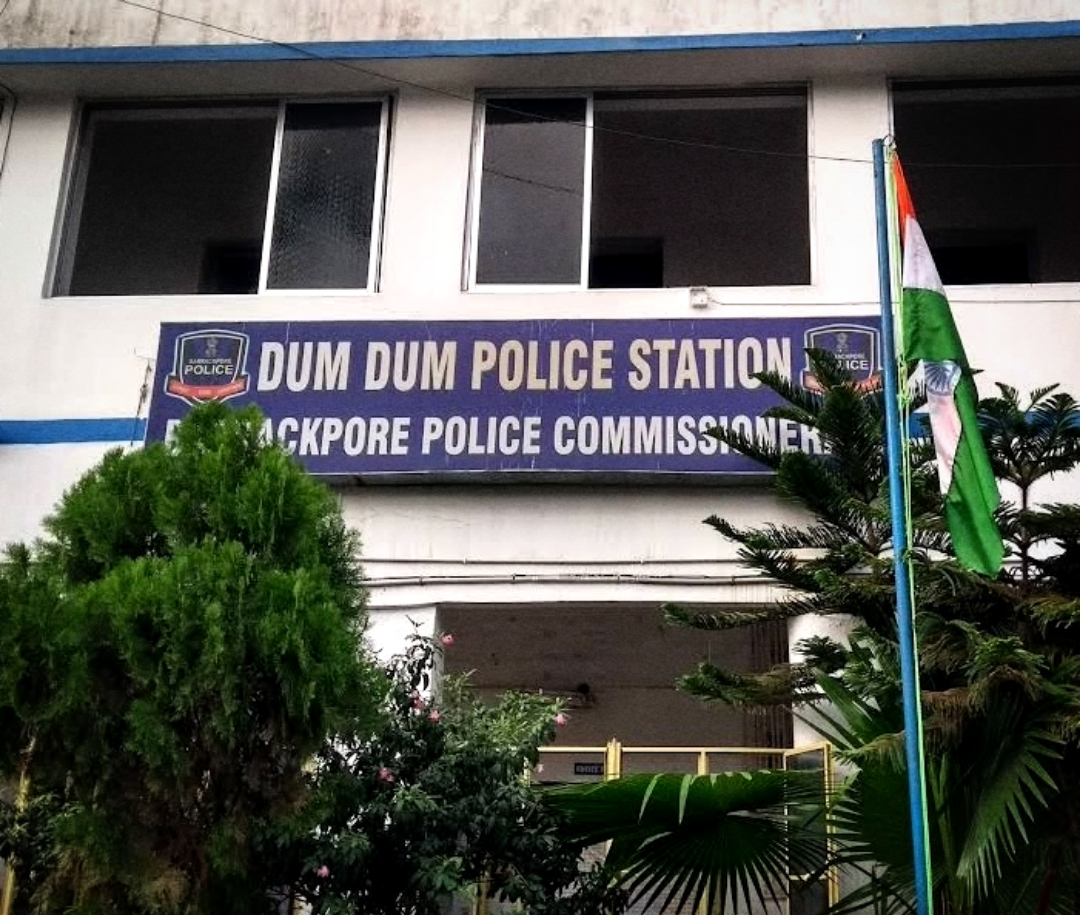
Dum Dum police station

Dum Dum police station under Barrackpore Police Commissionerate has jurisdiction over Gora Bazar areas.

== Transport ==
=== Railways ===
Dum Dum Cantonment railway station on the Sealdah-Bangaon line is situated nearby.

=== Metro ===
Dum Dum Cantonment metro station of Yellow Line is situated nearby.

=== Bus ===
Bus route number 30D serves the area which runs from Dum Dum Cantonment to Babughat.

=== Air ===
Netaji Subhash Chandra Bose International Airport is just 3.9 Km away from Dum Dum Cantonment.
