= Subhas Nagar =

- Neighbourhood
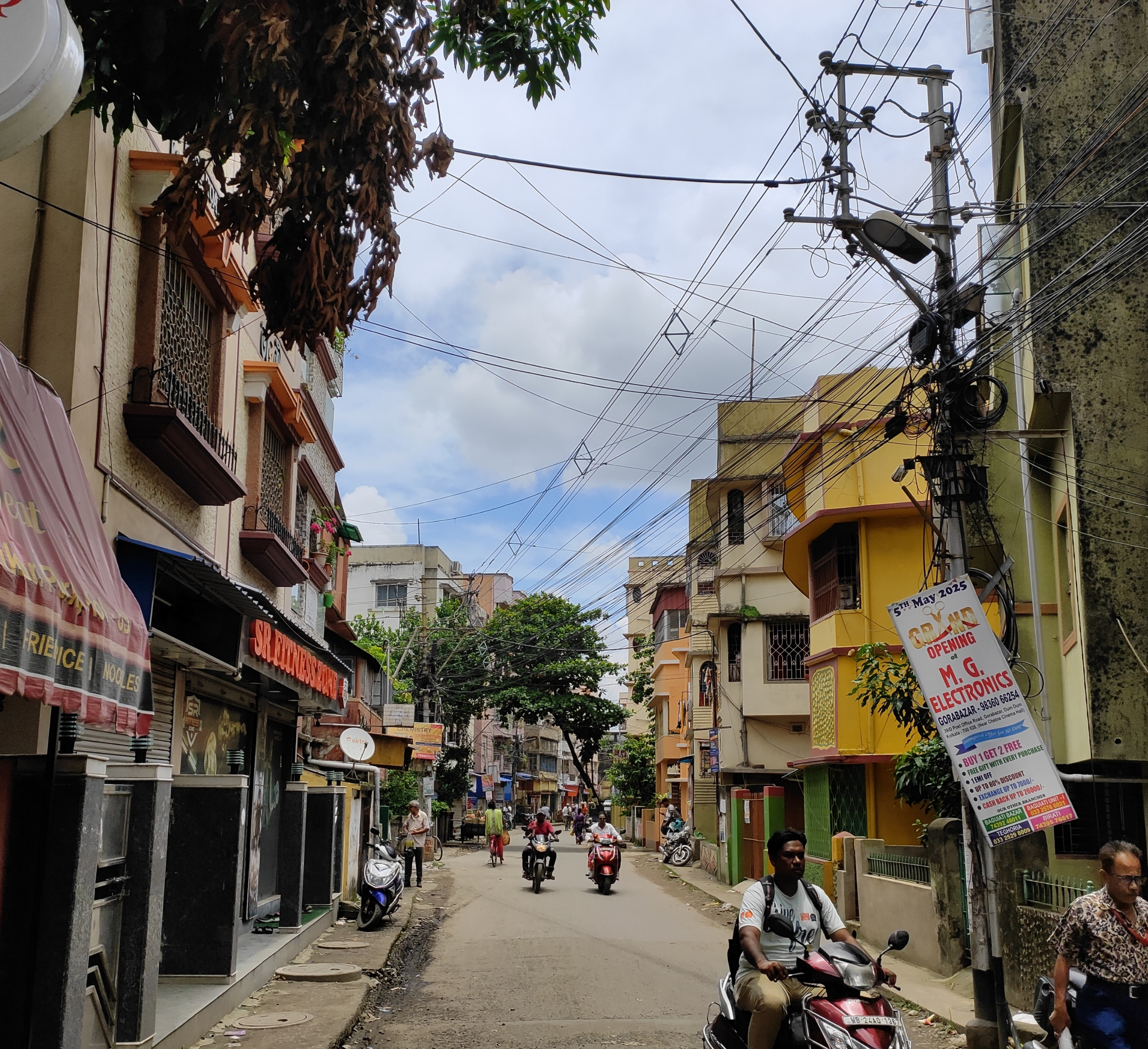
- Sarat Bose Rd

- Location in Kolkata Subhas Nagar (West Bengal) Subhas Nagar (India)
- Coordinates: 22.6354°N 88.4086°E
- Country: India
- State: West Bengal
- Division: Presidency
- District: North 24 Parganas
- Metro Station: Dum Dum Cantonment
- Railway Station: Dum Dum Cantonment

Government
  - Type: Municipality
  - Body: South Dumdum Municipality

Languages
  - Official: Bengali, English
- Time zone: UTC+5:30 (IST)
- PIN: 700065
- Telephone code: +91 33
- Vehicle registration: WB
- Lok Sabha constituency: Dum Dum
- Vidhan Sabha constituency: Dum Dum

Subhas Nagar is a locality in South Dumdum of North 24 Parganas district in the Indian state of West Bengal. It is a part of the area covered by Kolkata Metropolitan Development Authority (KMDA).

== Geography ==
Subhas Nagar is spread across Ward nos. 5 and 6 of South Dum Dum Municipality. Ward no. 6 covers the South Subhas Nagar area. It is a posh locality located near Dum Dum Cantonment metro station and Dum Dum Cantonment railway station. The locality is named after the prominent freedom fighter Netaji Subhas Chandra Bose.

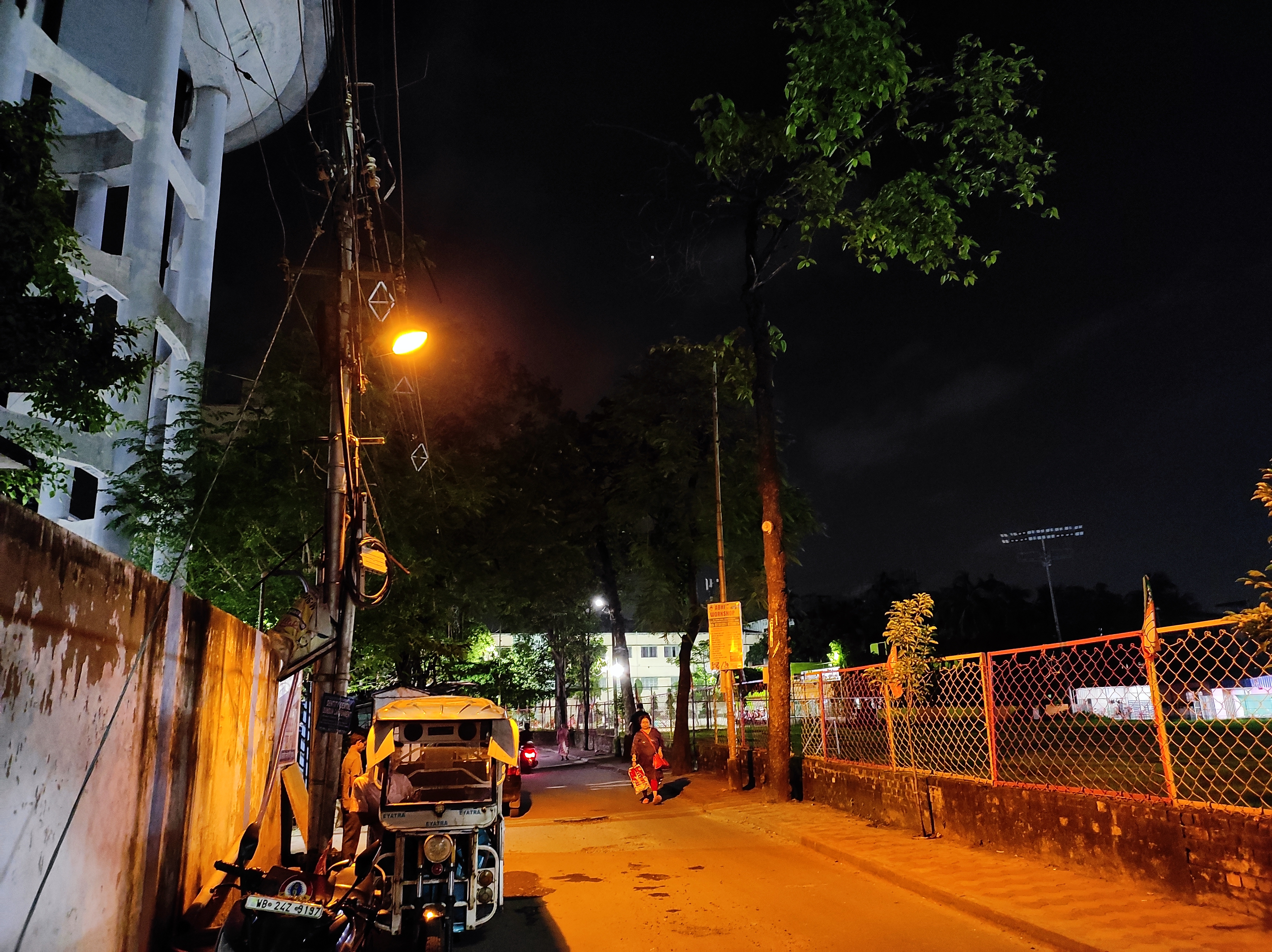
Lanes of Subhas Nagar

=== Police station ===
Dum Dum police station under Barrackpore Police Commissionerate has jurisdiction over Subhas Nagar areas.

=== Post Office ===
Rabindra Nagar has a delivery sub post office, with PIN 700065 in the Kolkata North Division of Kolkata district in Calcutta region. Other post office with the same PIN is Subhas Nagar.

== Education ==
Prominent schools in Subhas Nagar area are as follows:

- Dum Dum Subhas Nagar High School and
  Dum Dum Subhas Nagar Girls High School, Estd. in 1954 and 1955 respectively, are oldest and reputed higher secondary schools at Sarat Bose Rd, Subhas Nagar.
- Dum Dum Deshbandhu High School is a primary and a higher secondary school at Subhas Nagar Bye Lane, South Subhas Nagar. It was established in the year 1968.
- Subhas Nagar Prathamik Vidyalaya is a primary school at Subhas Nagar Rd. It was established in the year 1951.
- Adarsha Vidyabhavan, established in 1957, is a primary school at Sarat Bose Rd, Subhas Nagar (near Trikon Park).
- Rajendra Sarkhel Prathamik Vidyalaya is a primary school at South Rabindra Nagar. It was established in 1973.

== Transport ==
=== Railways ===
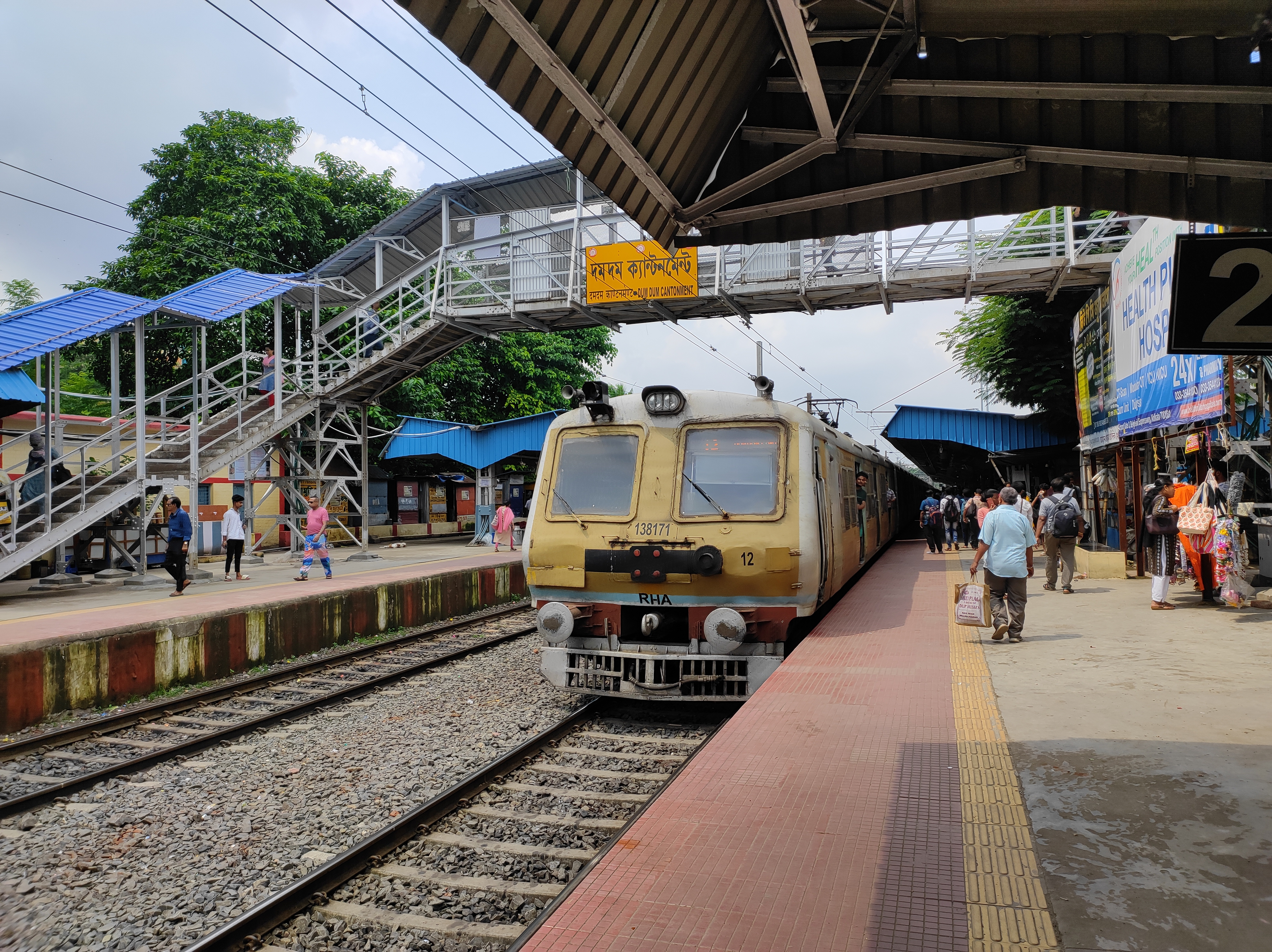
Dum Dum Cant. railway station

Dum Dum Cantonment railway station on the Sealdah-Bangaon line is situated nearby.

=== Metro ===
Dum Dum Cantonment metro station of Yellow Line is situated just near Subhas Nagar. Gate no. 1 and 2 of Dum Dum Cant. metro station serve Subhas Nagar areas.

=== Bus ===
Bus route number 30D serves the area which runs from Dum Dum Cantonment to Babughat.

=== Air ===
Netaji Subhash Chandra Bose International Airport is just 3.9 Km away from Dum Dum Cantonment.

== Markets ==
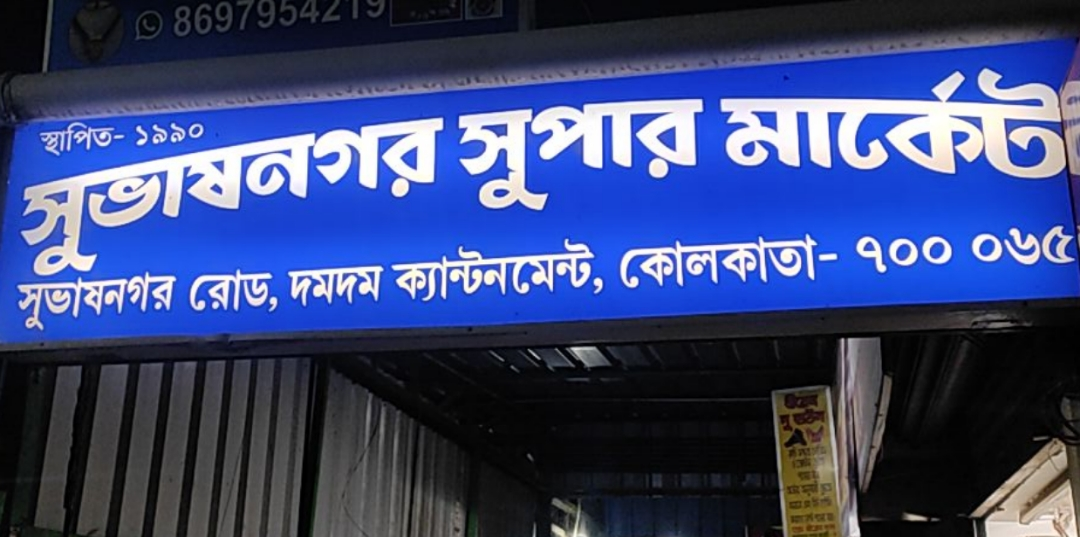
Subhas Nagar Supermarket

Markets in or near Subhas Nagar area are:

- Subhas Nagar Supermarket
- Gorabazar Market
- Natun Bazar Market
- S Paul Fish Market

== See also ==
- South Dum Dum
- Dum Dum Cantonment metro station
