= Dum Dum Cantonment metro station =

Metro station in Kolkata, India

Dum Dum Cantonment
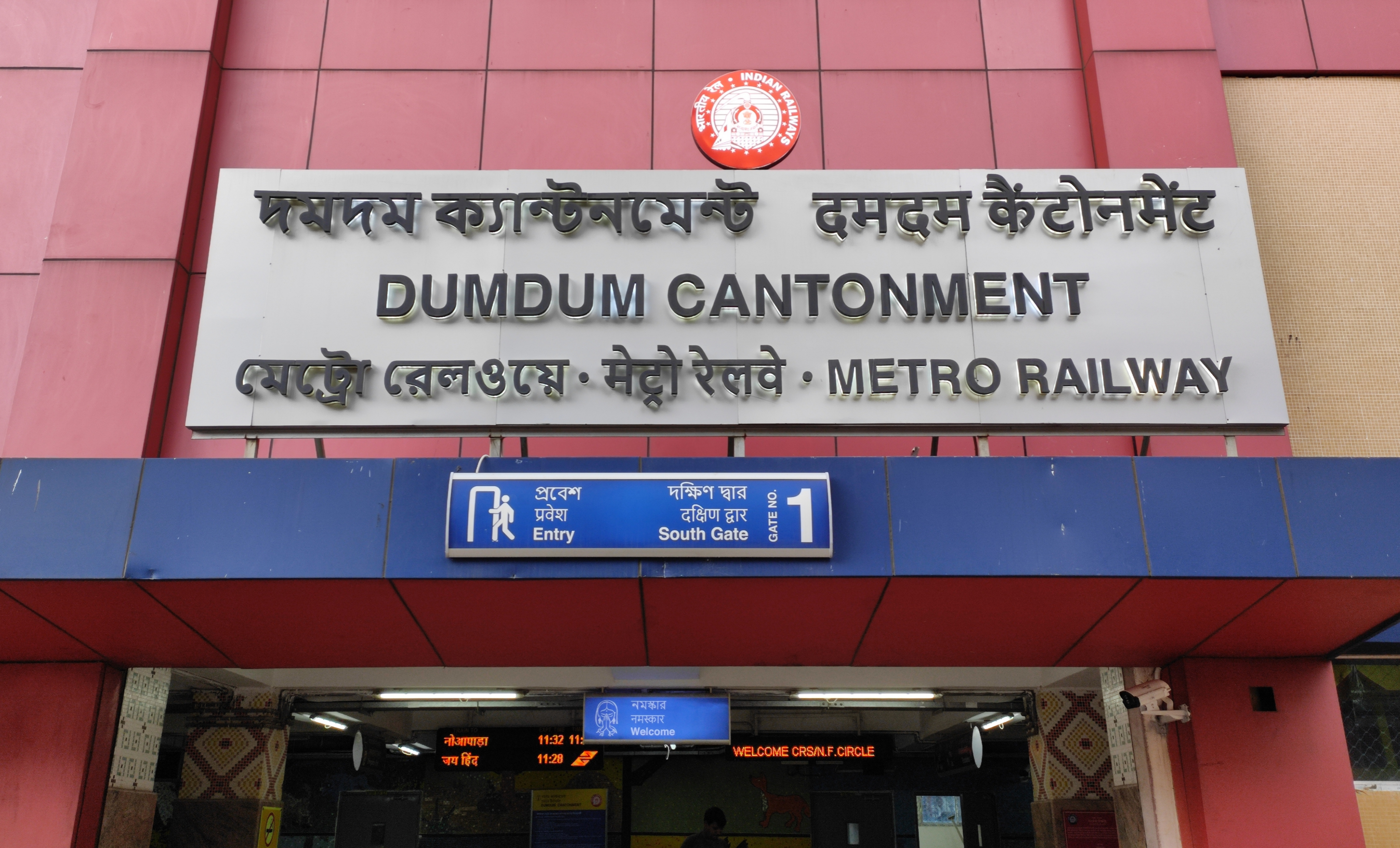

General information
- Location: Subhas Nagar, South Dumdum, West Bengal 700065; India
- Coordinates: 22.63732°N 88.41272°E
- System: Kolkata Metro
- Operated by: Metro Railway, Kolkata
- Line: Yellow Line
- Platforms: 2 (2 Side platforms)
- Tracks: 2
- Connections: Dum Dum Cantonment: Eastern; 30D Bus Stand

Construction
- Structure type: Elevated
- Parking: Yes
- Accessible: Yes

Other information
- Status: Operational
- Station code: KDCM

History
- Opened: 22 August 2025; 9 months ago

Services
Preceding station	Kolkata Metro	Following station
Noapara Terminus	Yellow Line	Jessore Road towards Jai Hind
Route map
Location

Dum Dum Cantonment is an elevated metro station of Yellow Line of Kolkata Metro in Subhas Nagar, South Dum Dum, West Bengal, India. The metro station adjoins the platforms of the Dum Dum Cantonment railway station where connections can be made with Indian Railways services. It was a part of the integration of old line of Circular Railway from Dum Dum Cantonment to Biman Bandar. The station was inaugurated on 22 August 2025.

== Station Layout ==
L2	Side platform
L2	Platform 1	towards Jai Hind (Jessore Road) →
L2	Platform 2	← towards Noapara (terminus)
L2	Side platform
L1	Mezzanine	Fare control, station agent, Metro Card vending machines, crossover
G	Street level	Exit/Entrance

== Entry/Exits ==
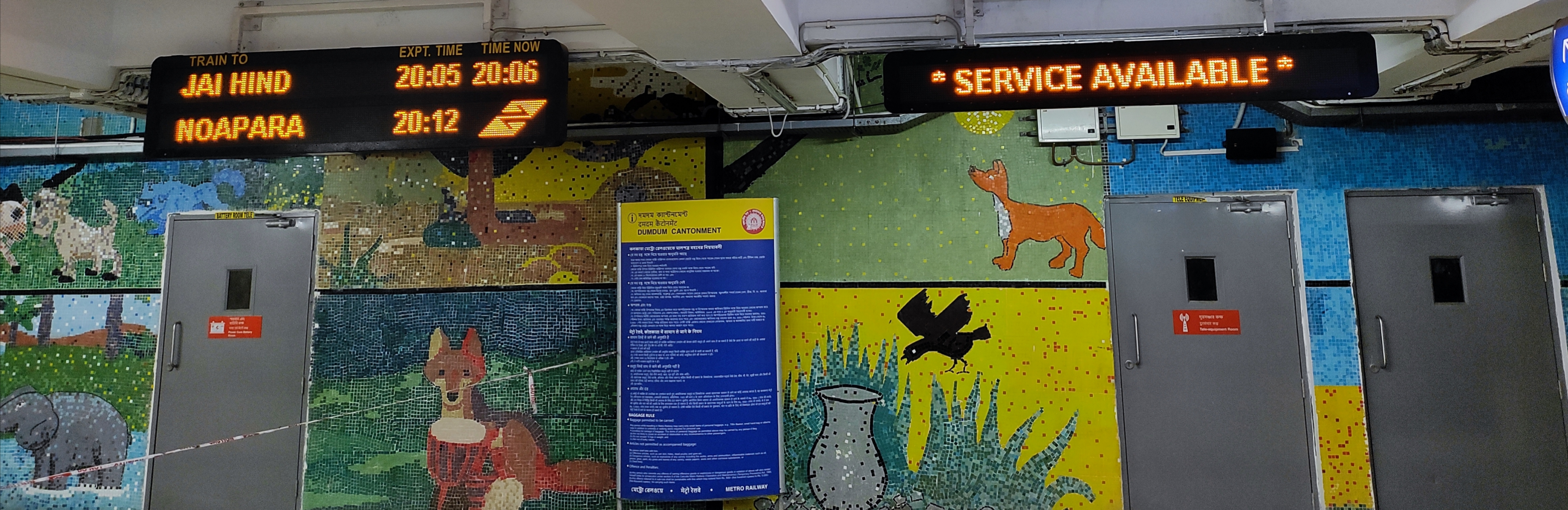

There are four entry and exit gates at this station. Gates 1 and 2 at the southern end serve Subhas Nagar. Gate 3 at the northern end serves Health More and the adjacent Dum Dum Cantonment areas. Gate 4 connects to the existing foot overbridge (FOB) of Dum Dum Cantonment railway station, providing direct access to the mezzanine floor.

- 1 & 2 - Subhas Nagar
- 3 - Health More
- 4 - Foot Over Bridge
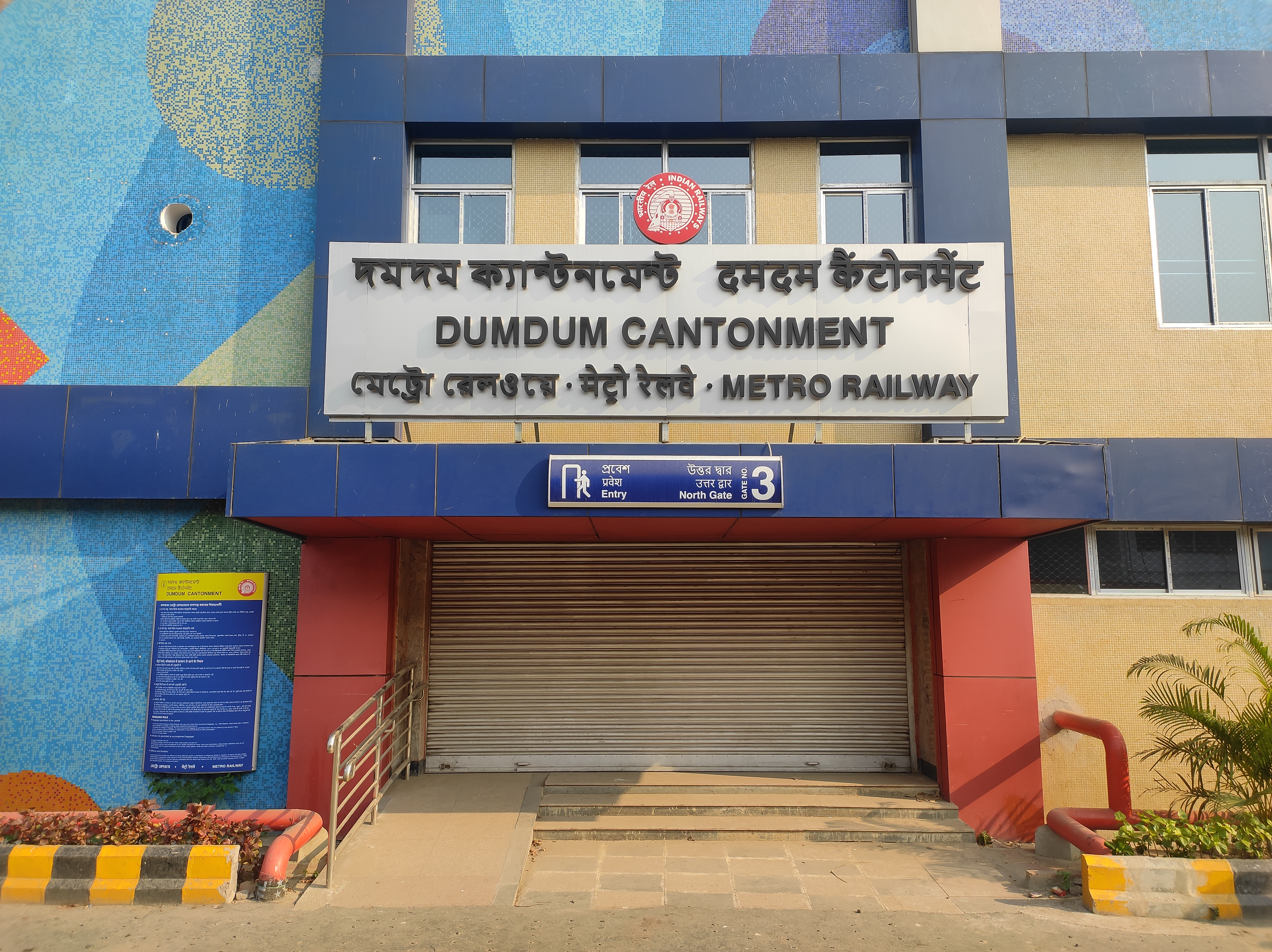
Dum Dum Cant Metro Stn. Gate no. 3

== Connections ==
=== Auto ===
8 Auto services are available from this station. Autos are available towards Nagerbazar More, Promod Nagar Bazar, Mathkal, Shibtala, Matish Roy Setu, 1 no. Airport Gate, Sukur Ali More and Dudhpukur.

=== Bus ===
Bus route number 30D serves the station which runs from Dum Dum Cantonment to Babughat.

=== Rail ===
Dum Dum Cantonment railway station is just beside the metro station.

=== Air ===
Netaji Subhash Chandra Bose International Airport is just 3.9 km away from the station which will be connected via this metro line. The Jai Hind metro station which will serve the airport.

== See also ==
- Dum Dum metro station
- Metro Railway, Kolkata
- List of Kolkata Metro stations
- Kolkata Metro Rail Corporation
- Kolkata Suburban Railway
- South Dum Dum
- Dum Dum
