= Dum Dum Cantonment railway station =

Railway station in West Bengal, India

Dum Dum Cantonment
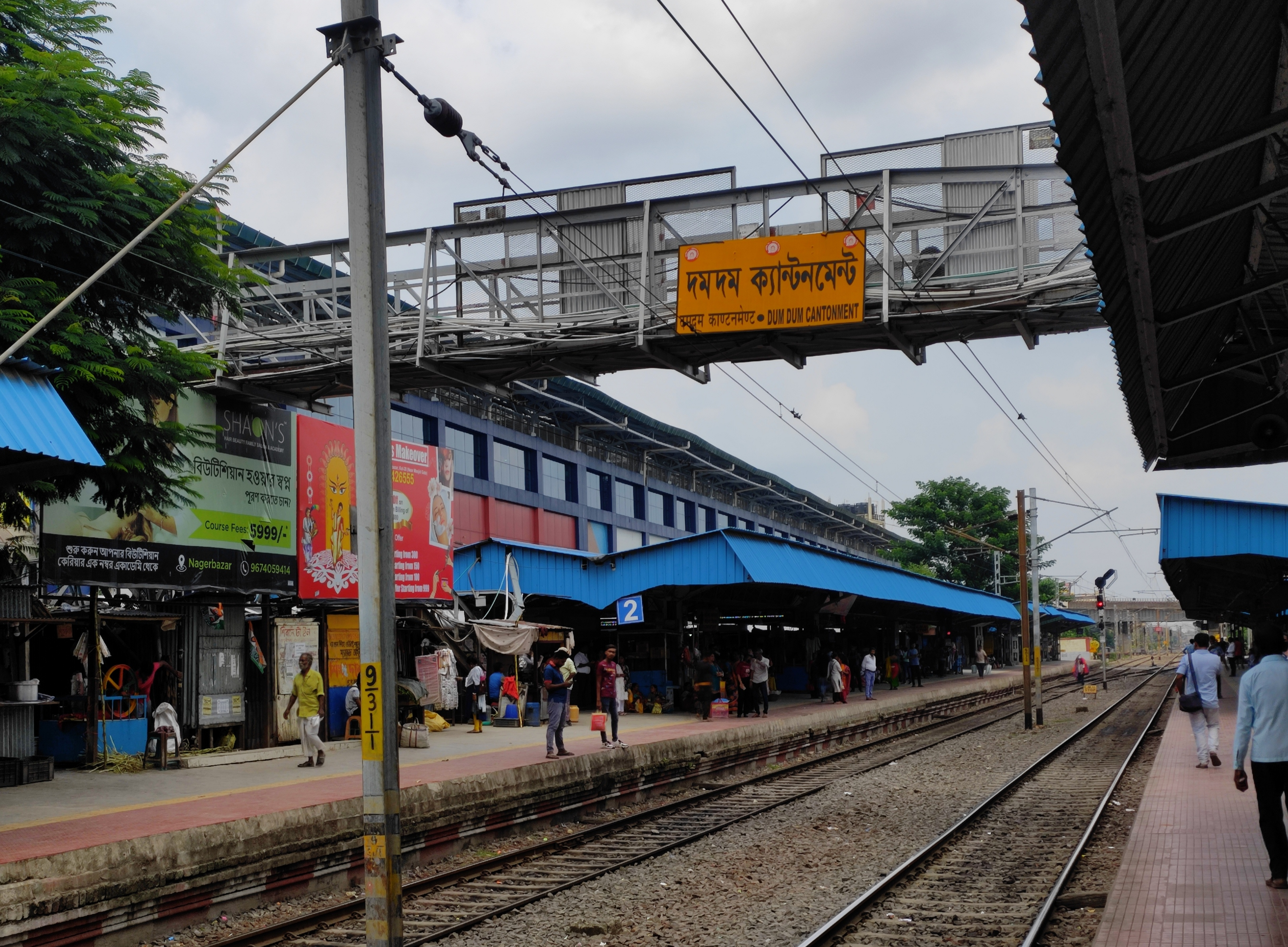

General information
- Location: NC Mitra Rd, Gorabazar, Kolkata, West Bengal 700028; India
- Coordinates: 22.636947°N 88.412212°E
- Elevation: 5 metres (16 ft)
- System: Kolkata Suburban Railway Station
- Owner: Indian Railways
- Operator: Eastern Railway
- Platforms: 3
- Tracks: 3
- Connections: Dum Dum Cantonment; 30D Bus stand

Construction
- Structure type: At grade
- Parking: Available
- Cycle facilities: Available

Other information
- Status: Active
- Station code: DDC
- Zone(s): Eastern Railway
- Division(s): Sealdah

History
- Opened: 1883; 143 years ago
- Electrified: 1963; 63 years ago

Services
Preceding station	Kolkata Suburban Railway	Following station
Dum Dum Jn towards Sealdah	Eastern Line Sealdah–Bangaon line	Durganagar towards Bangaon Junction
Route map
Location
- Location within Kolkata

Dum Dum Cantonment (DDC) is a Kolkata Suburban Railway station in Dum Dum. The Dum Dum Cantonment metro station is adjacent to Dum Dum Cantonment railway station. It was named by the Cantonment area near Dum Dum. It serves Gora Bazar, Subhas Nagar, Rabindra Nagar, Kumarpara and surrounding Dum Dum Cant. areas.

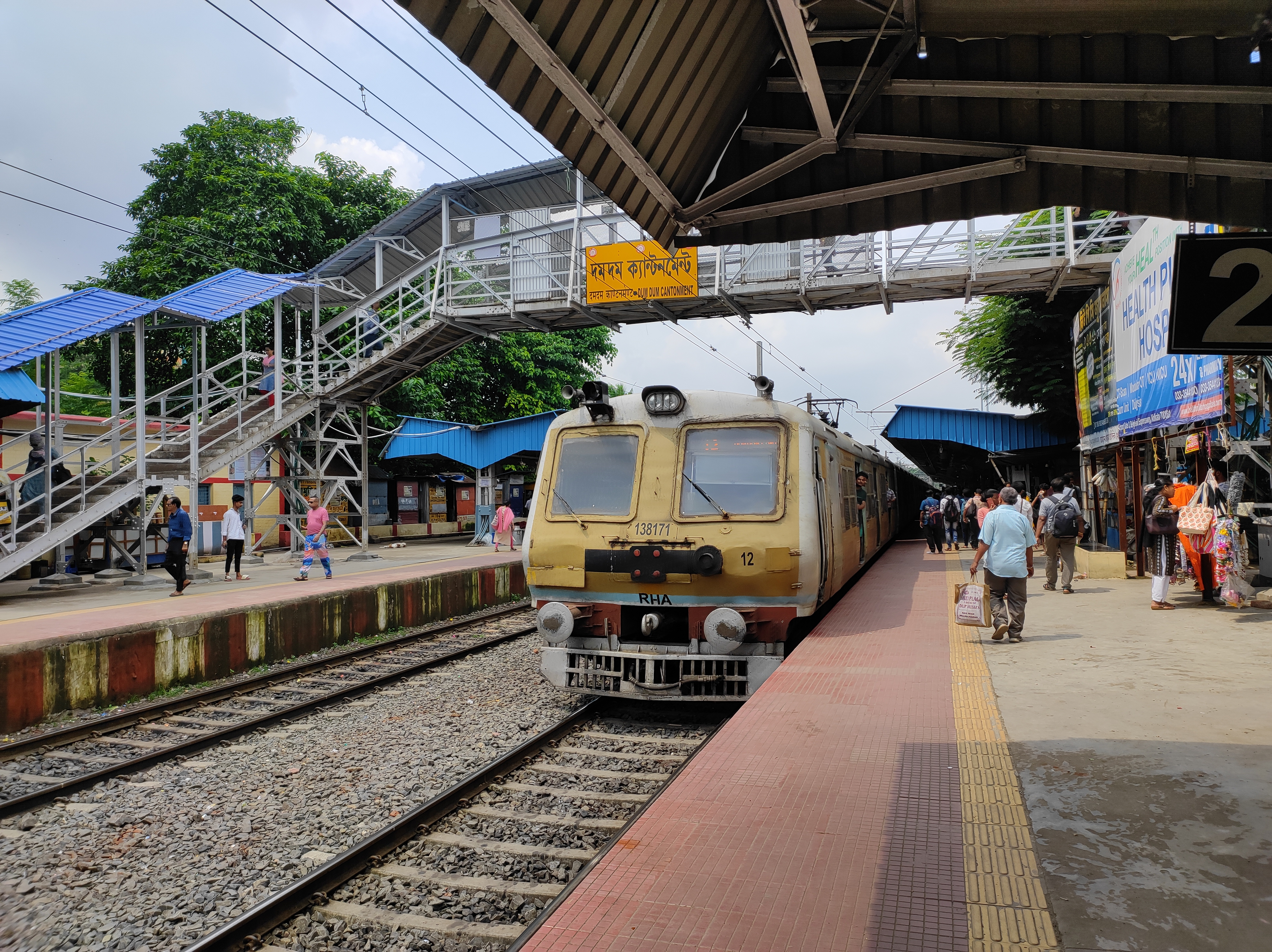
Sealdah - Dum Dum Cantonment Local

Dum Dum Cantonment is located on Sealdah–Hasnabad–Bangaon–Ranaghat line of Kolkata Suburban Railway. Link between Dum Dum to Khulna now in Bangladesh, via Bangaon was constructed by the Bengal Central Railway Company in 1882–84. The Sealdah–Dum Dum–Barasat–Ashok Nagar–Bangaon sector was electrified in 1963–64. It had been also a station of Kolkata Circular Railway between 2006 and 2016, after closure and dismantling of Dum Dum Cantonment - Biman Bandar section it is removed from Kolkata Circular Railway stations.

== Station complex ==
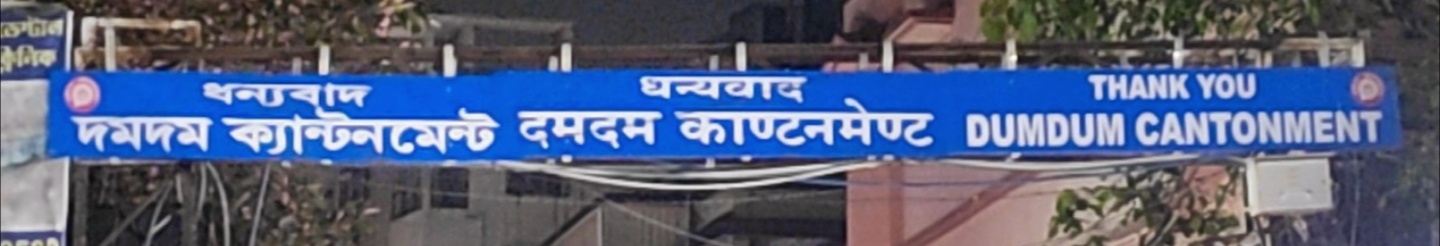

The station consists of three platforms. The platform is very much well sheltered with newly installed seating arrangements and fans.

== Connections ==
=== Air ===
Netaji Subhash Chandra Bose International Airport is just 3.9 km away from the station which was previously connected through Rail between 2006 and 2016. But after 2016 it was closed and dismantled. As of 2025, it is now connected through Yellow Line of Kolkata Metro.

=== Auto ===
8 Auto services are available from this station. Autos are available towards Nagerbazar More, Promod Nagar Bazar, Mathkal, Shibtala, Matish Roy Setu, 1 no. Airport Gate, Sukur Ali More and Dudhpukur.

=== Bus ===
Bus route number 30D serves the station which runs from Dum Dum Cantonment to Babughat.

=== Metro ===
Dum Dum Cantonment metro station of Yellow Line is situated just beside of it. It is connected through footover bridge.

== See also ==
- Indian Railways
- Sealdah railway station
- Sealdah–Hasnabad–Bangaon–Ranaghat line
- Dum Dum Junction railway station
- Transport in West Bengal
- List of railway stations in India
