= List of Kolkata Metro depots and yards =

Depots of Kolkata Metro

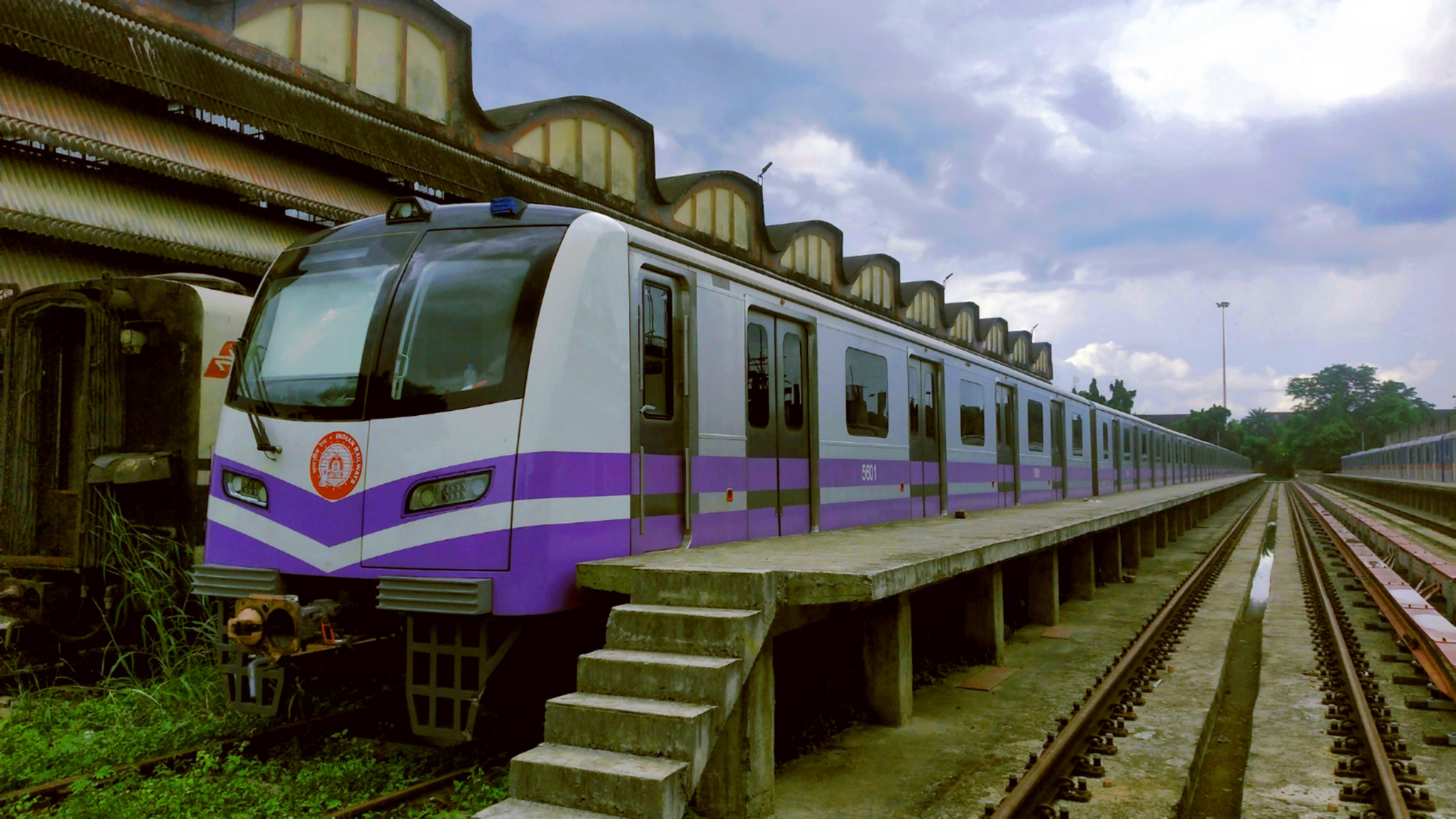
Noapara metro depot

The Kolkata Metro is a mass rapid transit urban railway network in Kolkata, India. It was the first underground railway to be built in India, with the first operations commencing on 24 October 1984. As of August 2025, there are 6 commercially operational depots Noapara, Tollygunge, New Garia, Central Park, Joka and Airport.

== Depots ==
=== Operational ===
#	Depot Name		Photo	Layout	Line(s)	Connected station	Opened	Track gauge	Electrification	Notes	Ref
#	English	Bengali	Photo	Layout	Line(s)	Connected station	Opened	Track gauge	Electrification	Notes	Ref
1	Noapara	নোয়াপাড়া			Blue Line; Yellow Line; Pink Line	Noapara and Dum Dum	1984	Broad gauge	750V DC	Oldest and biggest depot of Kolkata Metro. Also only depot of Kolkata metro, which is connected with Indian railways.	
2	Tollygunge	টালিগঞ্জ			Blue Line	Mahanayak Uttam Kumar	1984	Broad gauge	750V DC	Only metro depot in proper Kolkata	
3	New Garia	নিউ গড়িয়া			Blue Line; Orange Line	Kavi Subhash	2010	Broad gauge	750V DC		
4	Central Park	সেন্ট্রাল পার্ক			Green Line	Central Park City Centre	2018	Standard gauge	750V DC	Only Standard gauge depot of Kolkata metro.	
5	Joka	জোকা			Purple Line	Joka	2022	Broad gauge	750V DC	Southernmost Depot of Kolkata Metro.	
6	Airport	এয়ারপোর্ট			Yellow Line; Orange Line	Jai Hind	2025	Broad gauge	750V DC	Largest underground facility in India, but just a stabling yard.	

=== Under Construction ===
#	Depot Name		Photo	Layout	Line(s)	Connected station	Opening (expected)	Track gauge	Electrification	Notes	Ref
#	English	Bengali	Photo	Layout	Line(s)	Connected station	Opening (expected)	Track gauge	Electrification	Notes	Ref
1	New Town	নিউটাউন			Orange Line	Mother's Wax Museum	2026	Broad gauge	750V DC		
2	Jaypur	জয়পুর			Yellow Line	Jaypur	2030s	Broad gauge	750V DC		

== See also ==
- Kolkata Metro
- List of Kolkata Metro stations
- List of proposed and under-construction Kolkata metro stations
