= Noapara metro station and depot =

Metro interchange station and a terminus in North 24 Parganas, WB, India

Noapara
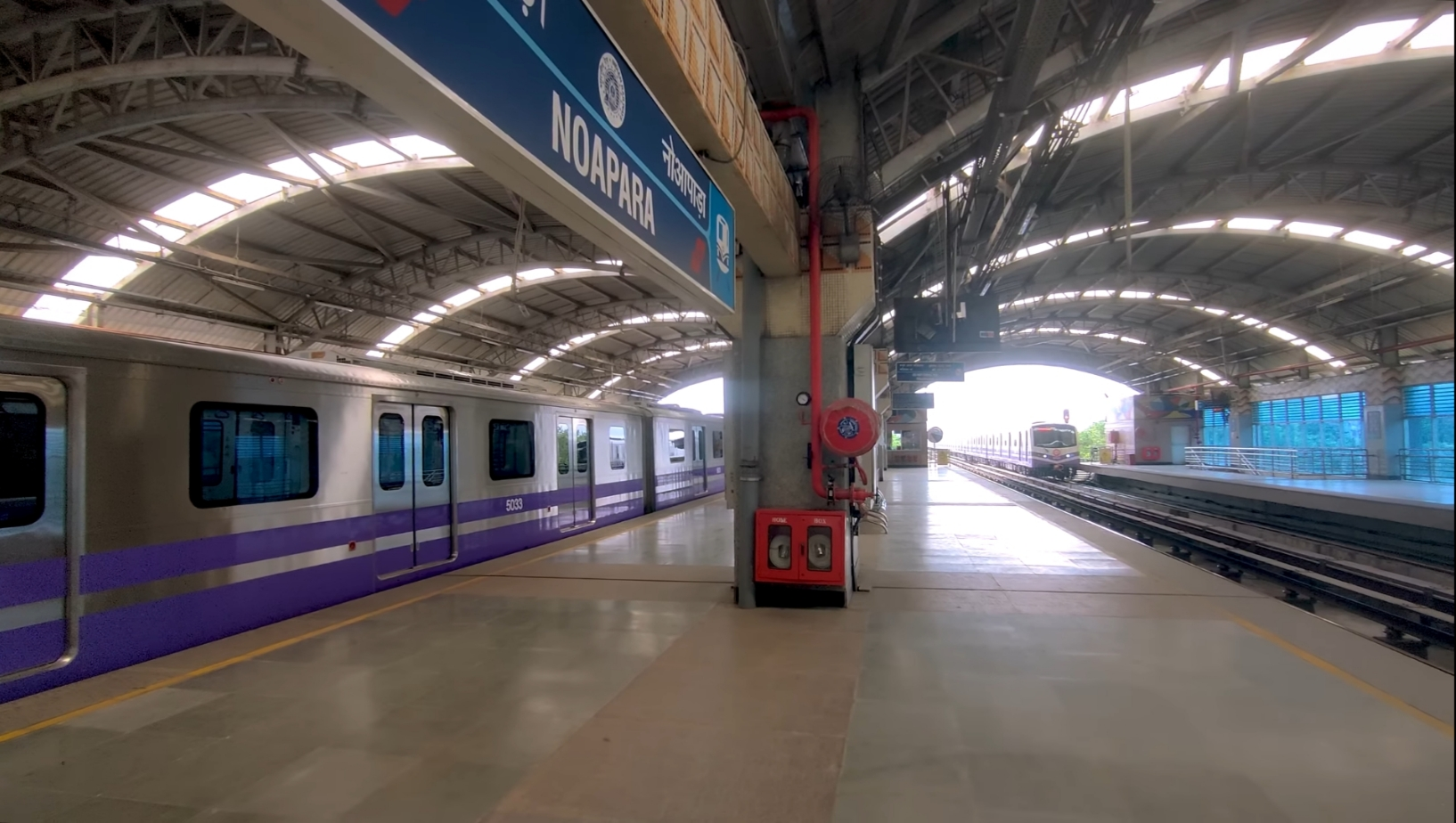
- A Blue Line CRRC Dalian rake at the interchange platform of Noapara metro station

General information
- Location: A.K Mukherjee Road, Noapara, Baranagar, Kolkata, West Bengal 700090; India
- Coordinates: 22.639673°N 88.393978°E
- System: Kolkata Metro
- Operator: Metro Railway, Kolkata
- Lines: Blue Line; Yellow Line
- Platforms: 4 (2 side platforms; 1 island platform)
- Tracks: 4

Construction
- Structure type: Elevated
- Accessible: Yes

Other information
- Status: Operational
- Station code: KNAP

History
- Opened: Blue Line : 10 July 2013; 13 years ago; Yellow Line : 25 August 2025; 14 months ago

Services
| Preceding station | Kolkata Metro | Following station |
|---|---|---|
| Baranagar towards Dakshineswar | Blue Line | Dum Dum towards Shahid Khudiram |
| Terminus | Yellow Line | Dum Dum Cantonment towards Jai Hind |
Route map
Location

Noapara is the largest elevated metro station on the North-South corridor of the Blue Line of Kolkata Metro in Noapara, Baranagar, West Bengal, India. It opened on 10 July 2013. The station is an interchange where it hosts Yellow Line of Kolkata Metro till Jai Hind via Dum Dum Cantonment.

== Station ==
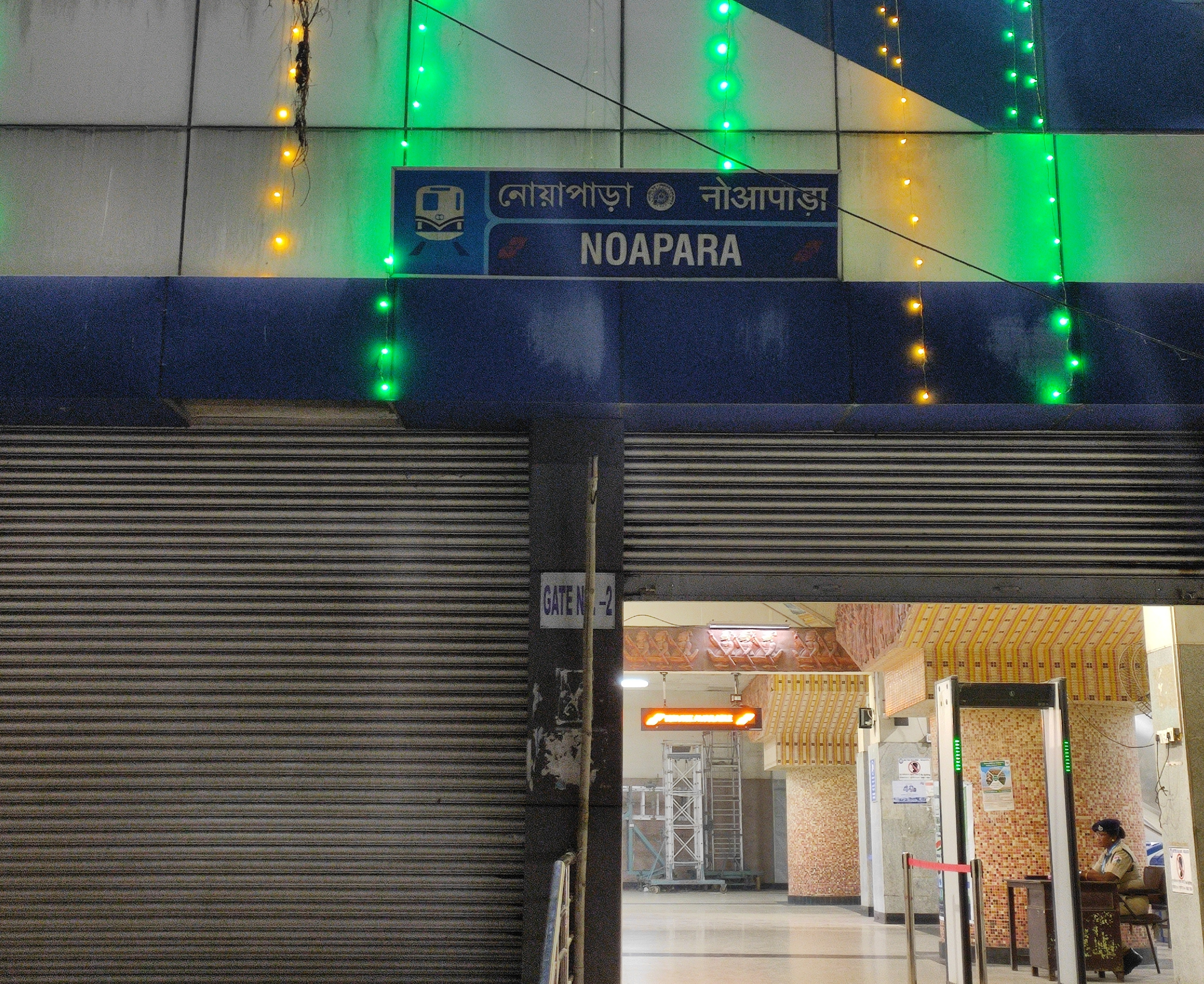
Noapara Metro station Gate no. 2

This interchange station includes two side and an island platform with lengths of 182 meters, unlike other Kolkata Metro stations. It serves the localities of Noapara, Tobin Road and Bonhooghly. The station has 2 stories, with 6 escalators and 4 elevators. There are also 31 CCTV cameras for increased security. The Metro Railway, Kolkata owns a 147 acres (59 ha) depot for maintenance and storage of rakes immediate east of the station. This elevated metro station for the serves both Blue Line and Yellow Line of Kolkata Metro, the latter being opened on 22 August 2025 as a part of Noapara–Jai Hind extension.

== Layout ==
| L2 | Side platform, Doors will open on the left |
| L2 | Platform 4 | Train towards Jai Hind (Dum Dum Cantonment) → |
| L2 | Platform 3 | ← Alighting only |
| L2 | Island platform, Doors will open on the left |
| L2 | cross-platform interchange |
| L2 | Platform 2 | Train towards Shahid Khudiram (Dum Dum) → |
| L2 | Platform 1 | ← Train towards Dakshineswar (Baranagar) |
| L2 | Side platform, Doors will open on the left |
| L1 | Concourse | Fare control, station agent, metro card vending machines, crossover |
| G | Street level | Exit/Entrance |

== Depot ==
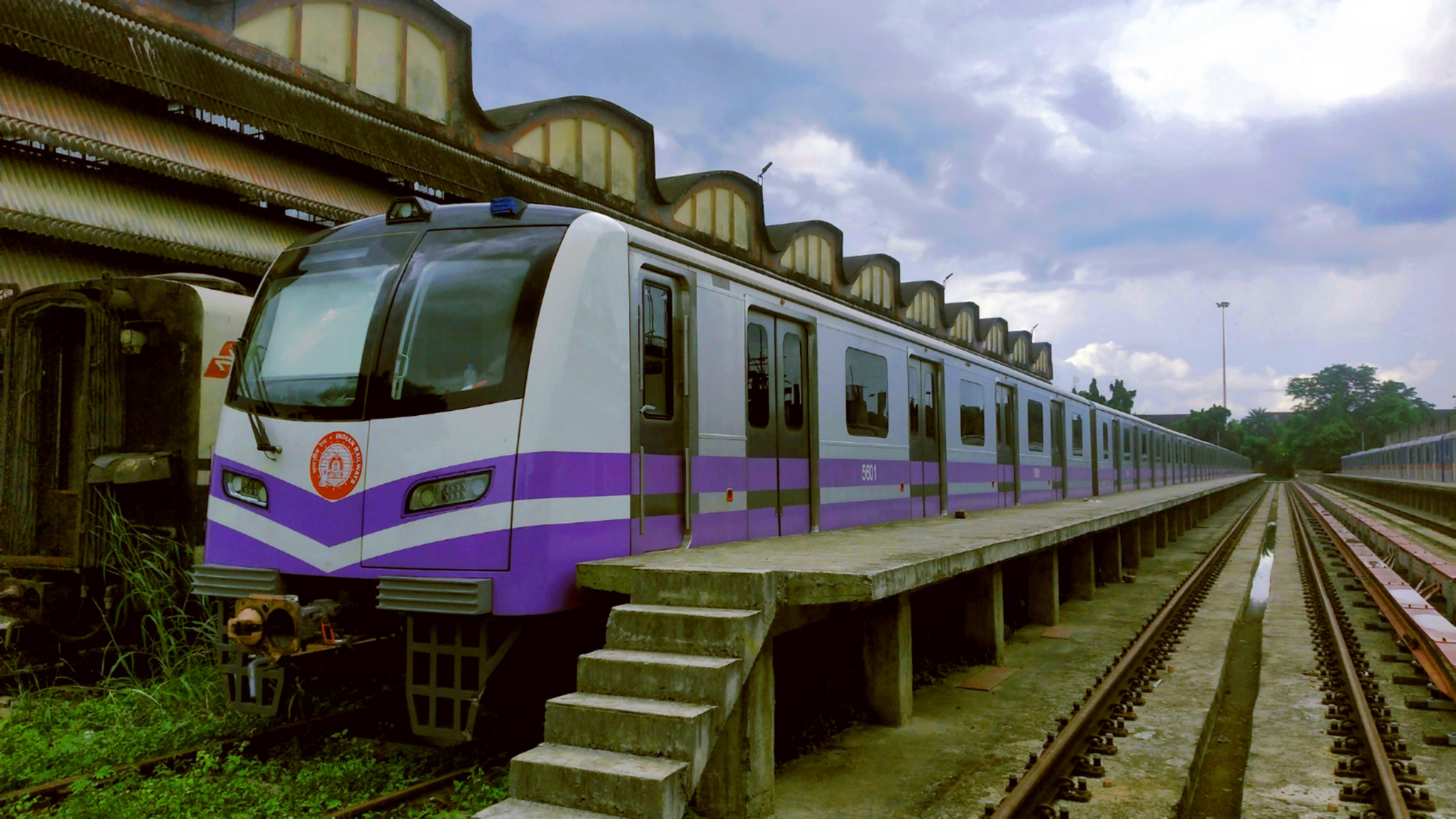
Metro depot at Noapara

Map of Noapara depot, Kolkata

This is the oldest and biggest metro depot in India. It serves the Blue Line and Yellow Line. This depot can hold maximum 40 rakes at a time. Newly received rakes are also tested here, and the old ones are kept here. The depot is connected to the Kolkata Chord line, so that newly manufactured rakes can directly be brought via train.

=== History ===
It was opened in 1984. Before that, it was a Railway yard and a track extended till Texmaco Rail & Engineering manufacturing unit.

== Connections ==
=== Bus ===
Bus route number 34C serves the station.

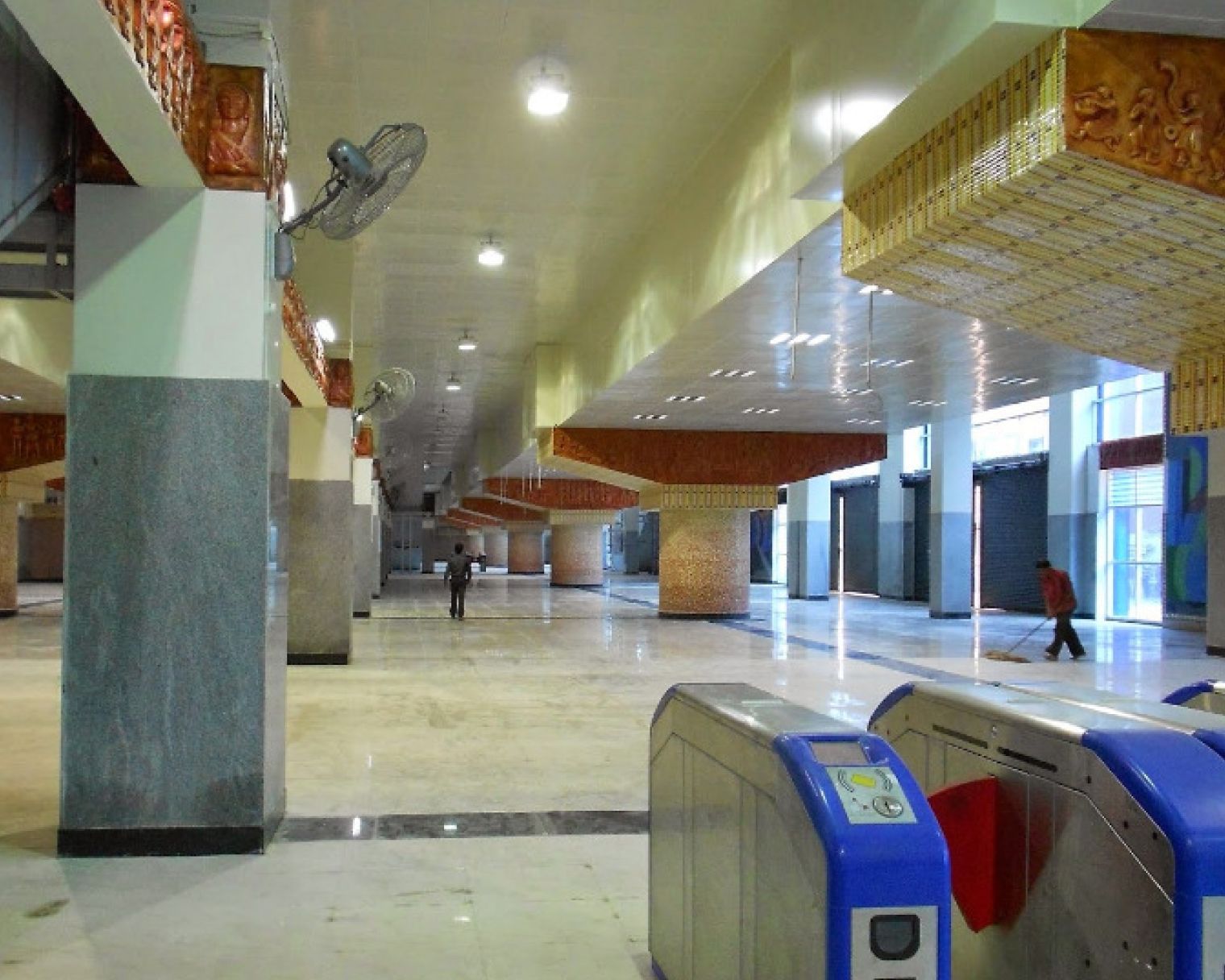
Noapara station concourse level

=== Auto ===
Autos are available towards Dunlop via Bon-Hooghly, Tobin Road, Mathkal via Promodnagar Bazar.

== See also ==
- Kolkata
- List of Kolkata Metro stations
- Transport in Kolkata
- Kolkata Metro Rail Corporation
- Kolkata Suburban Railway
- Kolkata Monorail
- Trams in Kolkata
- Noapara, India
- List of rapid transit systems
- List of metro systems
