= Yellow Line (Kolkata Metro) =

Transit line in Kolkata, India

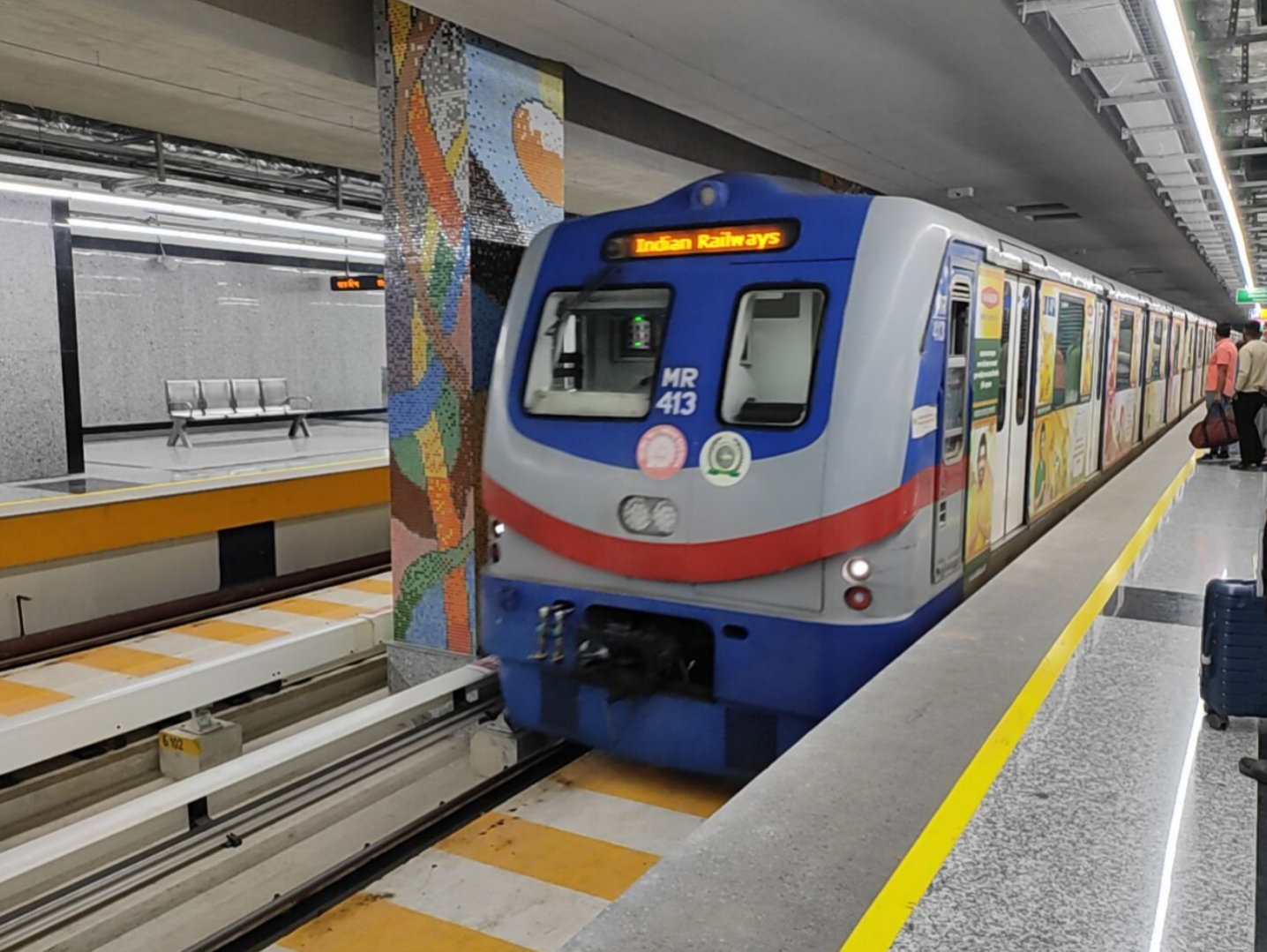
- A ICF Medha rake at Jai Hind metro station

Overview
- Status: Phase 1 - Operational; Phase 2 - Under Construction; Phase 3 - Planned
- Owner: Indian Railways
- Locale: Kolkata Metropolitan Region
- Termini: Noapara(West); Jai Hind(East)
- Connecting lines: Blue Line; Future: Orange Line
- Stations: 10
- Website: Indian Railways

Service
- Type: Rapid transit
- System: Kolkata Metro
- Operator: Metro Railway, Kolkata
- Depots: Noapara Depot; Airport yard; Barasat Depot (planned)
- Rolling stock: ICF BHEL; ICF MEDHA; CRRC Dalian

History
- Opened: 22 August 2025; 14 months ago

Technical
- Line length: 16.876 km (10.486 mi): Operational: 7.04 km (4.37 mi); Under Construction: 2.24 km (1.39 mi); Planned: 7.596 km (4.720 mi)
- Number of tracks: 2
- Track gauge: 5 ft 6 in (1,676 mm) broad gauge
- Electrification: 750 V DC third rail using third rail
- Operating speed: 80 km/h (designed)
- Signalling: CBTC signalling
Route map
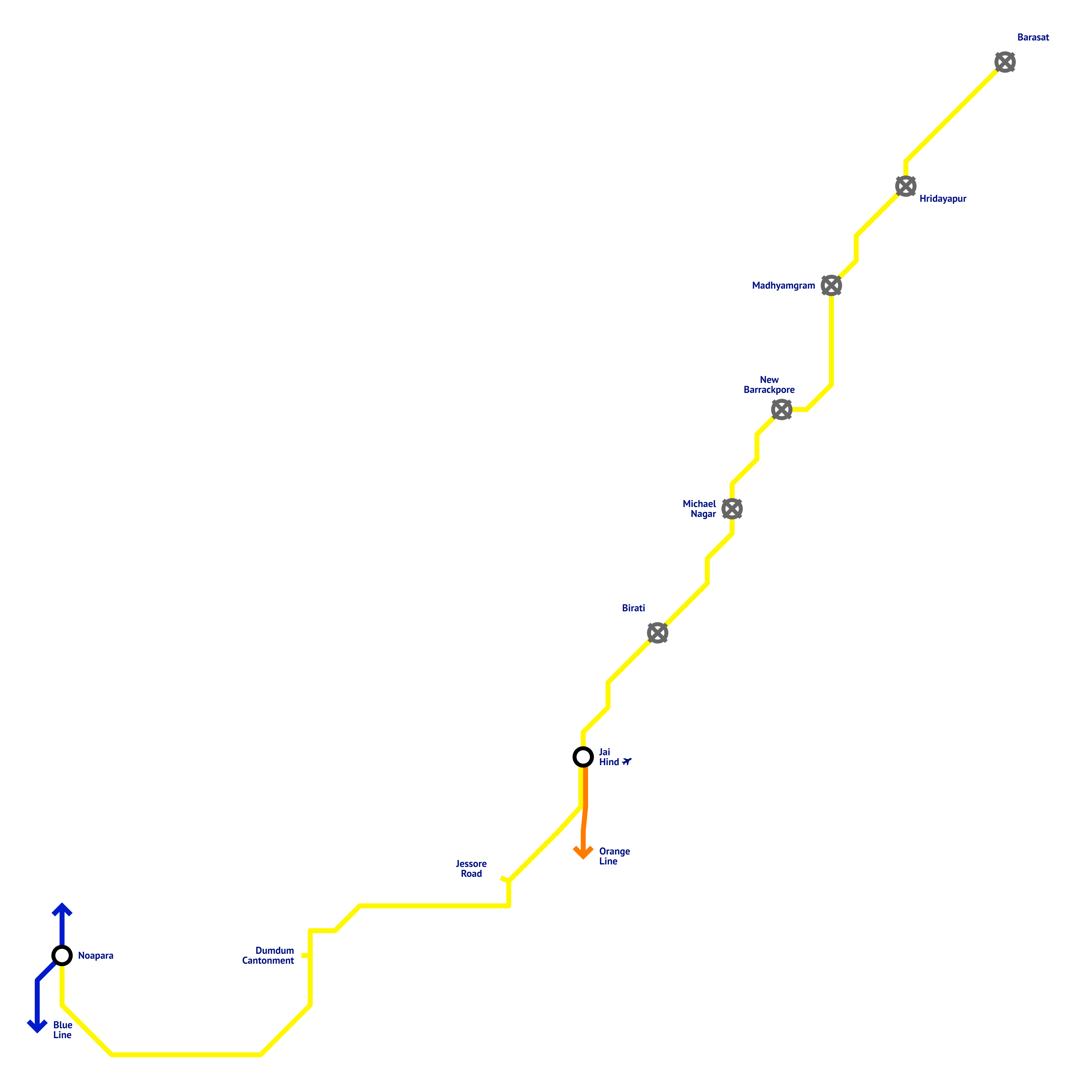

Yellow Line is a rapid transit metro line of the Kolkata Metro in Kolkata, West Bengal, India. It currently consists of a short operational section between Noapara and Jai Hind (Kolkata Airport) that was inaugurated on 22 August 2025. The full line will be 16.876 km (10.486 mi) long with 10 stations, running from Noapara to Barasat in North 24 Parganas. It is being built by RVNL, Senbo & ITD. It will run mostly on underground tunnels, the track is elevated from Noapara to Jessore Road and then go underground towards Barasat. It has an interchange at the Kolkata Airport with Orange Line.

== History ==
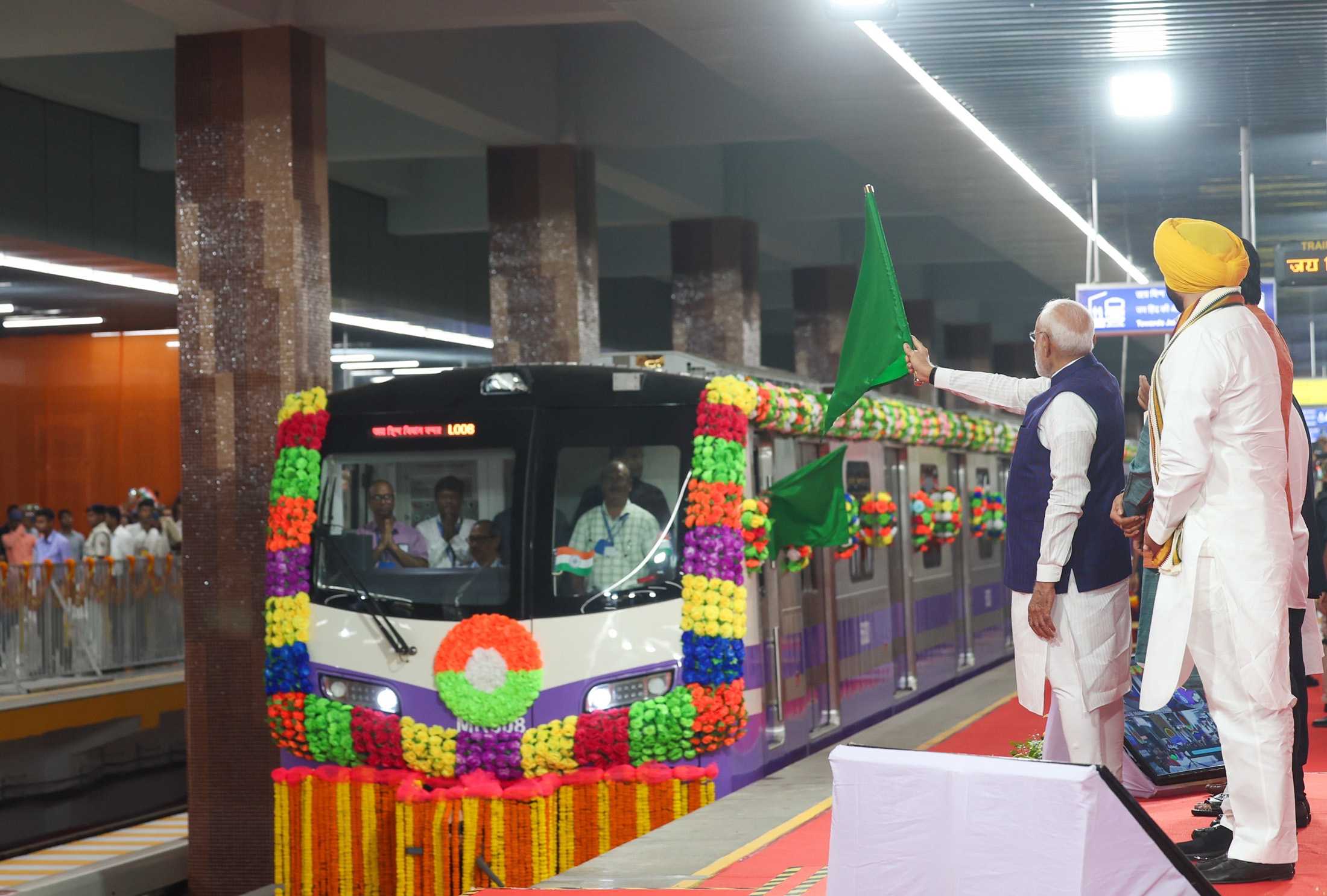
Prime Minister Narendra Modi flagging off yellow line metro train on August 22, 2025

The first phase of the Yellow Line between Noapara and Jai Hind (Biman Bandar) station was inaugurated by the Prime Minister Narendra Modi on August 22, 2025.

Commercial Operations between Noapara and Jai Hind (Bimanbandar) began on 25 August 2025.

weekday operations would increase to 120 services comprising 60 UP and 60 DN trains with operating hours extended from 7.18 am to 9.30 pm, instead of the current 7.55 am to 8.17 pm.

The first train will now leave Noapara at 7.18 am for the airport, advancing by nearly 40 minutes, while the first service from the airport to Noapara will begin at 7.40 am instead of 8 am.

Similarly, the last train from Noapara to Jai Hind (Bimanbandar) will now depart at 9.58 pm instead of 8 pm, and the final service from the airport will leave at 9.18 pm, nearly an hour later than before.

Weekend travellers will also benefit from a substantial frequency upgrade. On Saturdays, the number of services will more than double to 92 trains (46 UP and 46 DN), operating between 7.18 am and 9.30 pm, while on Sundays, 78 services (39 UP and 39 DN) will run from 9.18 am to 9.30 pm.

Importantly, the interval between trains on weekends will be reduced to 18 minutes from the earlier 35 minutes, providing smoother and more convenient travel for passengers.

== Timeline ==
The dates given are of Commercial Passenger Service not of Inauguration Day.

History
Extension date	Terminals		Length
25 August 2025	Noapara	Jai Hind	6.77 kilometers (4.21 mi)
Total	Noapara	Jai Hind	6.77 kilometers (4.21 mi)

=== Trial Run:- ===
11 March 2024 -> The first ever trial run was conducted between Noapara Metro Station and DumDum Cantonment Metro station using a Medha Metro Rake.

14 December 2024 -> The first full trial run of Phase - I i.e., the stretch from Noapara Metro Station to Jai Hind (Bimanbandar / Kolkata Airport) Metro Station was conducted.

=== Inaugural Run:- ===
22 August 2025 -> The first Inaugural Run was commenced from Noapara Metro Station to Jai Hind (Bimanbandar / Kolkata Airport) Metro Station.

== Stations for newly proposed alignment ==
The stations of this corridor proposed according to the new alignment are:

Yellow Line
No.	Station Name		Station Code	Opening	Connections	Layout	Platform Type
No.	English	Bengali	Station Code	Opening	Connections	Layout	Platform Type
1	Noapara	নোয়াপাড়া	KNAP	22 August 2025	Blue Line	Elevated	Side & Island
2	Dum Dum Cantonment	দমদম ক্যান্টনমেন্ট	KDCM	22 August 2025	Dum Dum Cantonment	Elevated	Side
3	Jessore Road	যশোহর রোড	KJRO	22 August 2025		At grade	Side
4	Jai Hind	জয় হিন্দ	KJHD	22 August 2025	Orange Line (Under Construction); Netaji Subhas Chandra Bose International Airport	Underground	Side & Island
5	Birati	বিরাটি	-	Under construction		Underground	Island
6	Michael Nagar	মাইকেল নগর	-	Under construction		Underground	Island
7	Bidhanpally	বিধানপল্লী	-	Proposed		Underground	Island
8	Madhyamgram	মধ্যমগ্রাম	-	Proposed	Madhyamgram	Underground	Island
9	Hridaypur	হৃদয়পুর	-	Proposed	Hridaypur	Underground	Island
10	Vidyasagar Stadium	বিদ্যাসাগর স্টেডিয়াম	-	Proposed		Underground	Island
11	Barasat	বারাসত	-	Proposed	Barasat Junction	Underground	Island
12	Uttar Seethi	উত্তর সিঁথি	-	Proposed		Underground	Island
13	Jaypur	জয়পুর	-	Proposed		Underground	Island
14	Suripukur	সুরি পুকুর	-	Proposed		Underground	Island

== Project development ==
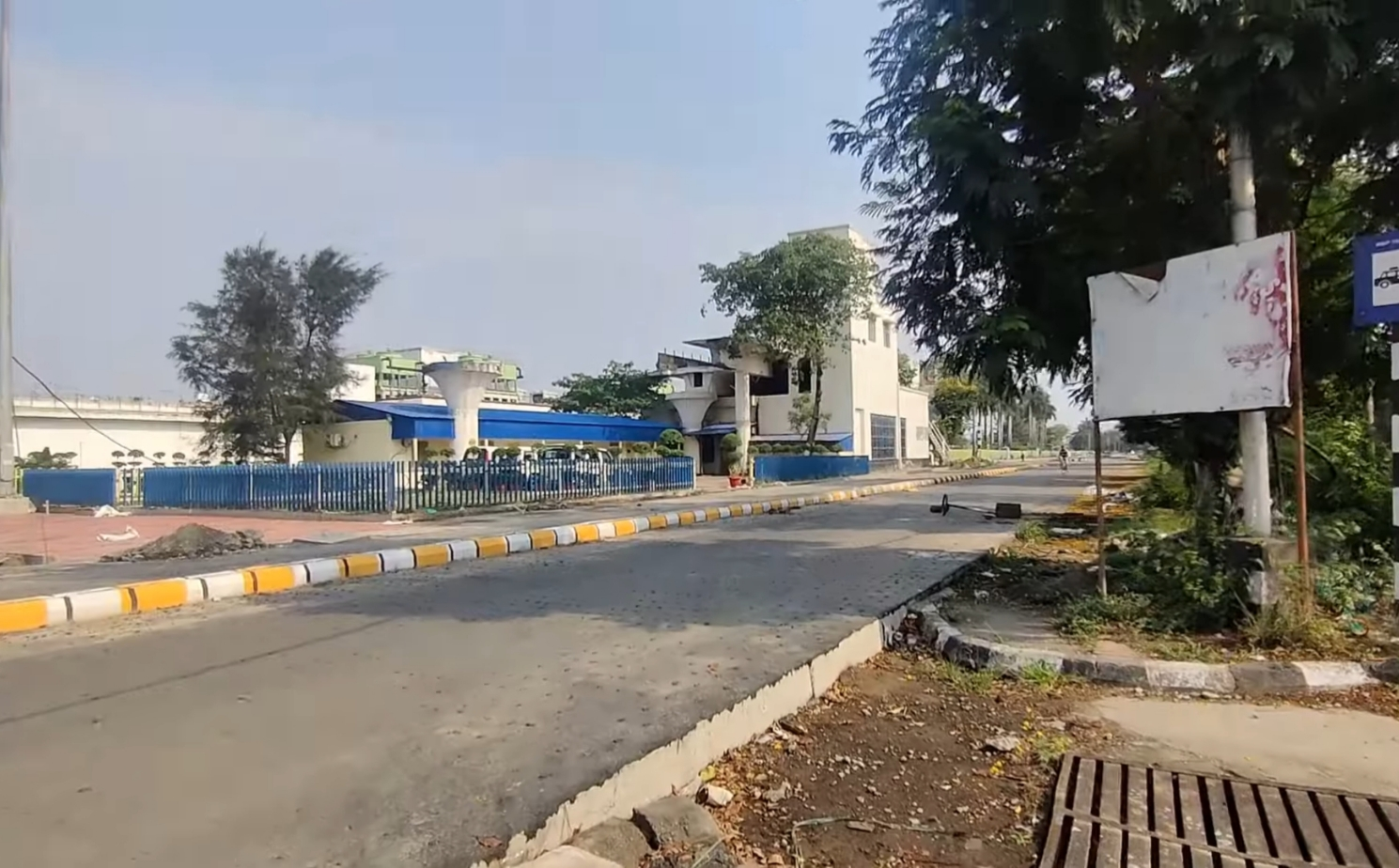
Biman Bandar railway station remants

Earlier, this line was planned to be divided into two lines: the up line and the down line. Both were meant to start from Noapara Metro Station and meet at Bimanbandar railway station. The up line was meant to run along with the Belghoria express and meant to have two new stations at Ramkrishna Pally and Shantinagar. The down line was meant to use Old Dum Dum Cantonment - Biman Bandar section's alignment, viaducts, and stations. However, the plan changed later, and now both lines will pass through the Dum Dum Cantonment - Bimanbandar section.

The project will be completed in three phases. The first phase of work from Noapara to Jai Hind was opened on 22 August 2025. In the second phase work from Jai Hind to New Barrackpore will be done and in the last phase from New Barrackpore to Barasat work will be done. But the development work from New Barrackpore to Barasat has been stalled for the last eight years since it was sanctioned because of encroachments. and the Airport Authority of India objected to the elevated stretches from New Barrackpore to Barasat. Later, after objections from AAI, a decision was taken to convert this into an underground stretch. On 29 June 2019 sanction for material modification for underground construction at an additional cost of ₹1,615 crore (US$170 million) was sent to the Railway Board by Metro. For this underground tunneling, AAI has agreed to shift its fuel tanks, buildings, and cables, and the project is expected to start in 2020.

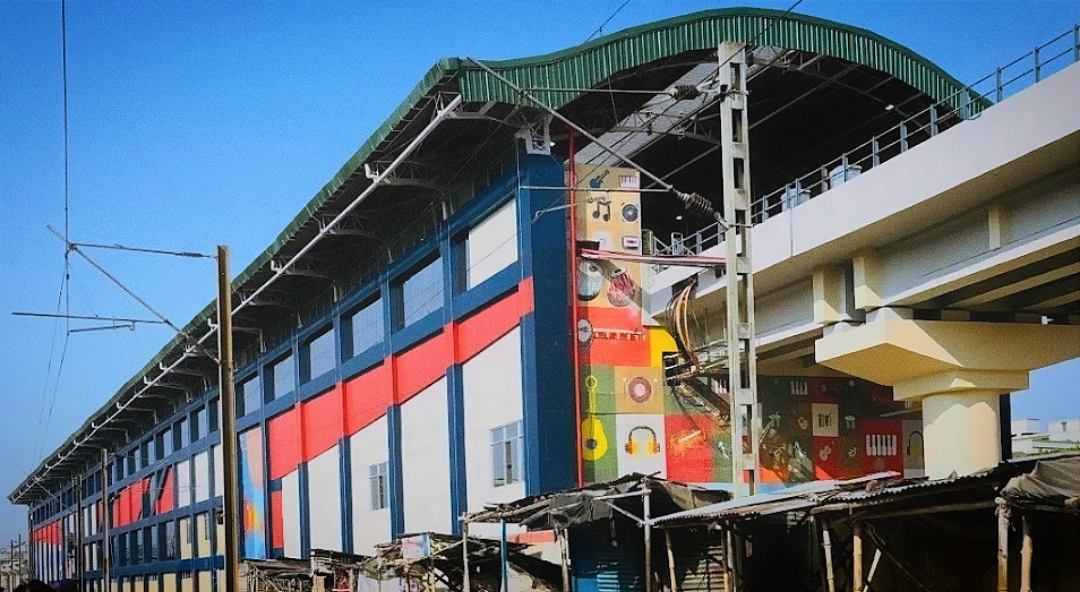
Dum Dum Cantonment metro station

An amount of Rs 227 crore contract to build this station, along with a mostly at-grade 2.16 km (1.34 mi) section from the Bagjola Canal to the existing ramp of the Airport Circular Railway track was awarded to Senbo Engineering Limited back in June 2011. Since then, the station's civil structure has been built, but work on the at-grade track section could not be started due to land acquisition issues along the line's proposed alignment. But the rehabilitation work was completed in 2020, and the work is going smoothly. Recently, girders were placed over Eastern Railway tracks. The metro station is set to be operational by Mid-2025. Construction of an underground integrated station for Orange Line and Yellow Line has begun at NSCBI Airport land just 150 metres (492 ft) away from the terminal building.

The development of New Barrackpore to Barasat was supposed to go elevated to cut down the expenses, but the stretch was in doubt due to a huge encroachment problem. But in February 2021, Prime Minister Narendra Modi gave his nod to construct this stretch underground, giving respite to thousands of families who were supposed to be evicted for the development of the elevated stretch. To lower the cost of the underground work, latest technology TBM will not be used, instead old technology of cut and cover method will be used for metro.

However, in August 2025, before the inauguration of the Noapara–Biman Bandar section, it was reported that some changes in line alignment from Michael Nagar to Barasat would be made which would be constructed underground using Tunnel boring machine that would lead to an increase in the total length of the line from 18 km to 22 km, adding three new stations beyond Barasat. These changes were made due to objections from AAI regarding the use of tall cranes and to avoid significant encroachment problems.

Yellow Line has been divided into three phases.

- Phase 1: Noapara - Jai Hind (Biman Bandar) (Operational)
- Phase 2: Jai Hind (Biman Bandar) - Michael Nagar (Under construction)
- Phase 3: Michael Nagar - Suripukur (Planned, construction will begin soon)

== See also ==
- List of Kolkata metro stations
- Kolkata Metro Rolling Stock
- List of rapid transit systems
- Trams in Kolkata
- Kolkata Lightrail
- Kolkata Monorail
- Kolkata Suburban Railway
