= Metro Railway, Kolkata =

Railway zone of India

- India's first, Kolkata's pride
- Company type: Public transport
- Predecessor: Metropolitan Transport Project (MTP)
- Founded: 1969
- Headquarters: Metro Railway, Kolkata, Metro Rail Bhavan, 33/1 J.L. Nehru Road, Kolkata - 700071, India
- Area served: Kolkata
- Key people: S.S.Mishra (General Manager)
- Services: Metro transportation service
- Operating income: ₹150 crore (US$16 million) ▲ (2018)
- Net income: ₹164.86 crore (US$17 million) ▲ (2018)
- Owner: Govt. of India
- Parent: Indian Railways
- Website: Metro Railway, Kolkata

Metro Railway, Kolkata, is the owner and operator of Kolkata Metro, the oldest metro system of India. On 29 December 2010, it became the 19th zone of the Indian Railways, operated by the Ministry of Railways.

== History ==
Logo previously used before becoming the zone of Indian Railways

In 1969, the Metropolitan Transport Project was formed under Indian Railways. In 1971, MTP proposed to build 5 rapid transit lines for Kolkata. With help of Soviet specialists (Lenmetroproekt) and East German engineers, prepared a master plan to provide metro lines for the city of Kolkata, totaling a route length of 97.5 km in 1971.

== Lines ==
Currently it owns and operates Blue Line, Yellow Line, Purple Line, Orange Line and operates Green Line. It will operate Pink line after its completion. From July 2019, KMRC handed over the operations of Green Line to Metro Railway, Kolkata.

== Construction ==
=== Under Metro Railway, Kolkata ===
It is currently constructing the Yellow Line. It is a 16.876 km long line from Noapara to Barasat.

=== Total sanctioned projects ===
- No. of projects: 6
- Total length: 98.3 kilometres (61.1 mi)
- Sanctioned cost: ₹23,481.79 crore (US$2.4 billion)
- Expenditure: ₹91,330.02 crore (US$9.5 billion) (up to March 2019)
- Budget outlay (2019-20): ₹1,676 crore (US$170 million)

== Departments ==
1. Accounts
2. Electrical
3. Vigilance
4. Traffic
5. Engineering
6. Signalling
7. Personnel
8. Medical
9. Stores

== Magazine ==
Metro Chetna, a e-magazine published in Hindi, every 3 months by Metro Railway, Kolkata. It was first published in 2017, and discontinued in 2018.

== Durga Puja arrangements ==
Some special arrangements and services are made especially during Durga Puja and Depavali every year. These are-

- Greeting passengers along with commercial displays
- Distribution of pamphlets among pandal hoppers showing names of important puja pandals around the 24 stations
- Affixing of posters at earmarked locations inside 24 stations displaying names of important Puja pandals
- Vinyl stickers conveying festive greetings
- Placement of directional boards, showing names of well-known puja pandals for better crowd management

== See also ==
- Indian Railways
- Kolkata Metro
- Kolkata Metro Rail Corporation
- Zones and divisions of Indian Railways
