= Motijheel (disambiguation) =

Motijheel Thana is the central business district, city centre and downtown of Dhaka, Bangladesh.

Motijheel (lit. 'Pearl Lake') may also refer to:

== Lakes ==
- Motijhil, a lake in Murshidabad, West Bengal, India
- Moti Jheel, a lake in Kanpur, Uttar Pradesh, India
- Motijheel, Dum Dum, a neighbourhood of Presidency, West Bengal, India

== Metro stations ==
- Motijheel metro station, an elevated metro station in Dhaka
- Moti Jheel metro station, terminal metro station in Kanpur, Uttar Pradesh, India

== Schools ==
- Motijheel Government Boys' High School, Motijheel, Dhaka
