= Rabindra Nagar =

- Neighbourhood
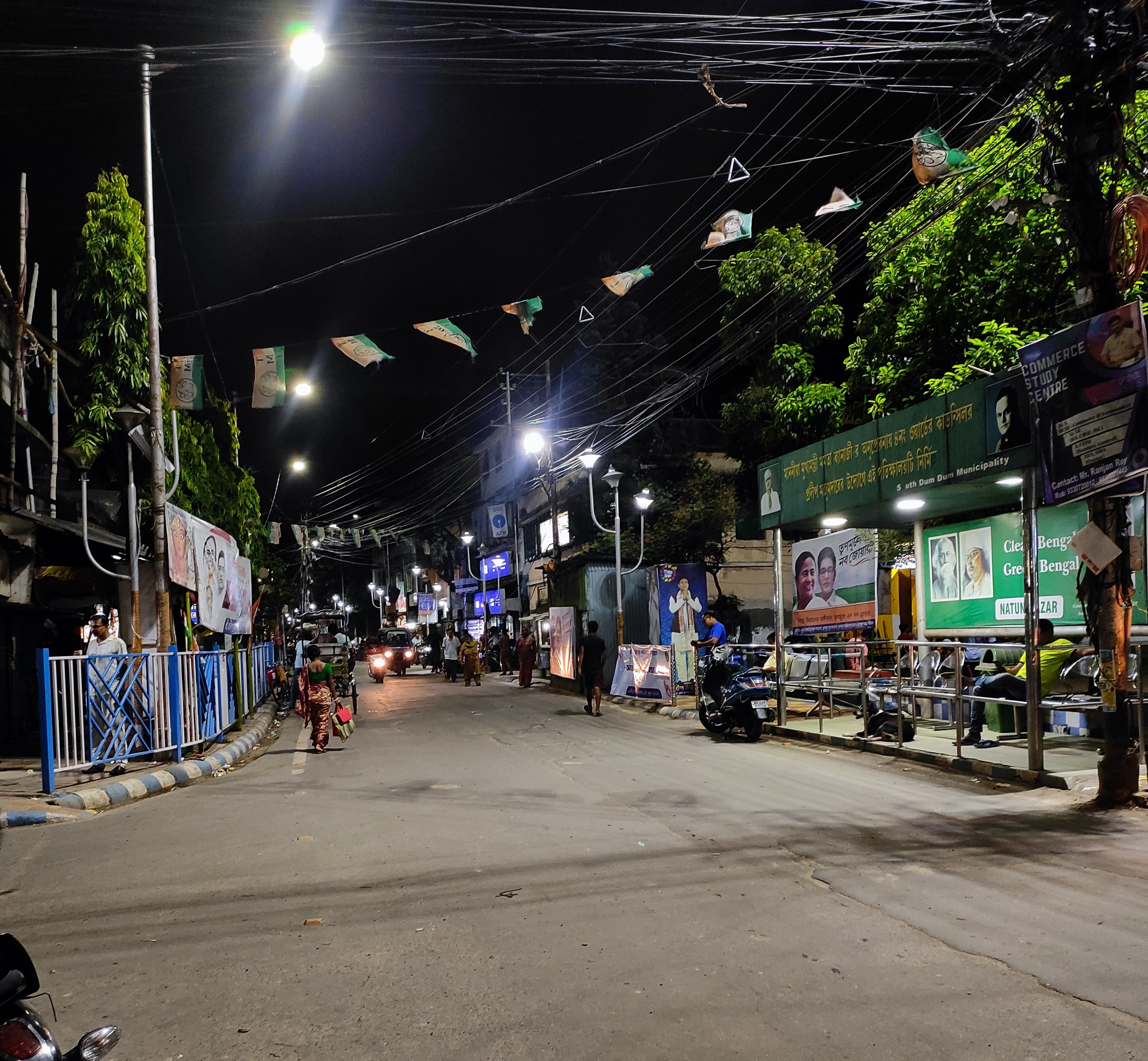
- Rabindra Sarani

- Location in Kolkata Rabindra Nagar (West Bengal) Rabindra Nagar (India)
- Coordinates: 22.6403°N 88.4077°E
- Country: India
- State: West Bengal
- Division: Presidency
- District: North 24 Parganas
- Metro Station: Dum Dum Cantonment
- Railway Station: Dum Dum Cantonment

Government
  - Type: Municipality
  - Body: South Dumdum Municipality

Languages
  - Official: Bengali, English
- Time zone: UTC+5:30 (IST)
- PIN: 700065
- Telephone code: +91 33
- Vehicle registration: WB
- Lok Sabha constituency: Dum Dum
- Vidhan Sabha constituency: Dum Dum

Rabindranagar is a locality in South Dumdum of North 24 Parganas district in the Indian state of West Bengal. It is a part of the area covered by Kolkata Metropolitan Development Authority (KMDA). Adjoined localities are West Rabindra Nagar, Garui and Subhas Nagar.

== Geography ==
=== Post Office ===
Rabindra Nagar has a delivery sub post office, with PIN 700065 in the Kolkata North Division of Kolkata district in Calcutta region. Other post office with the same PIN is Subhas Nagar and Health Institute.

=== Police station ===
Dum Dum police station under Barrackpore Police Commissionerate has jurisdiction over Natun Bazar areas.

== Transport ==
=== Railways ===
Dum Dum Cantonment railway station on the Sealdah-Bangaon line is situated nearby.

=== Metro ===
Dum Dum Cantonment metro station of Yellow Line serve Rabindra Nagar areas.

=== Bus ===
Bus route number 30D serves the area which runs from Dum Dum Cantonment to Babughat.

=== Air ===
Netaji Subhash Chandra Bose International Airport is just 3.9 Km away from Dum Dum Cantonment.

== Markets ==
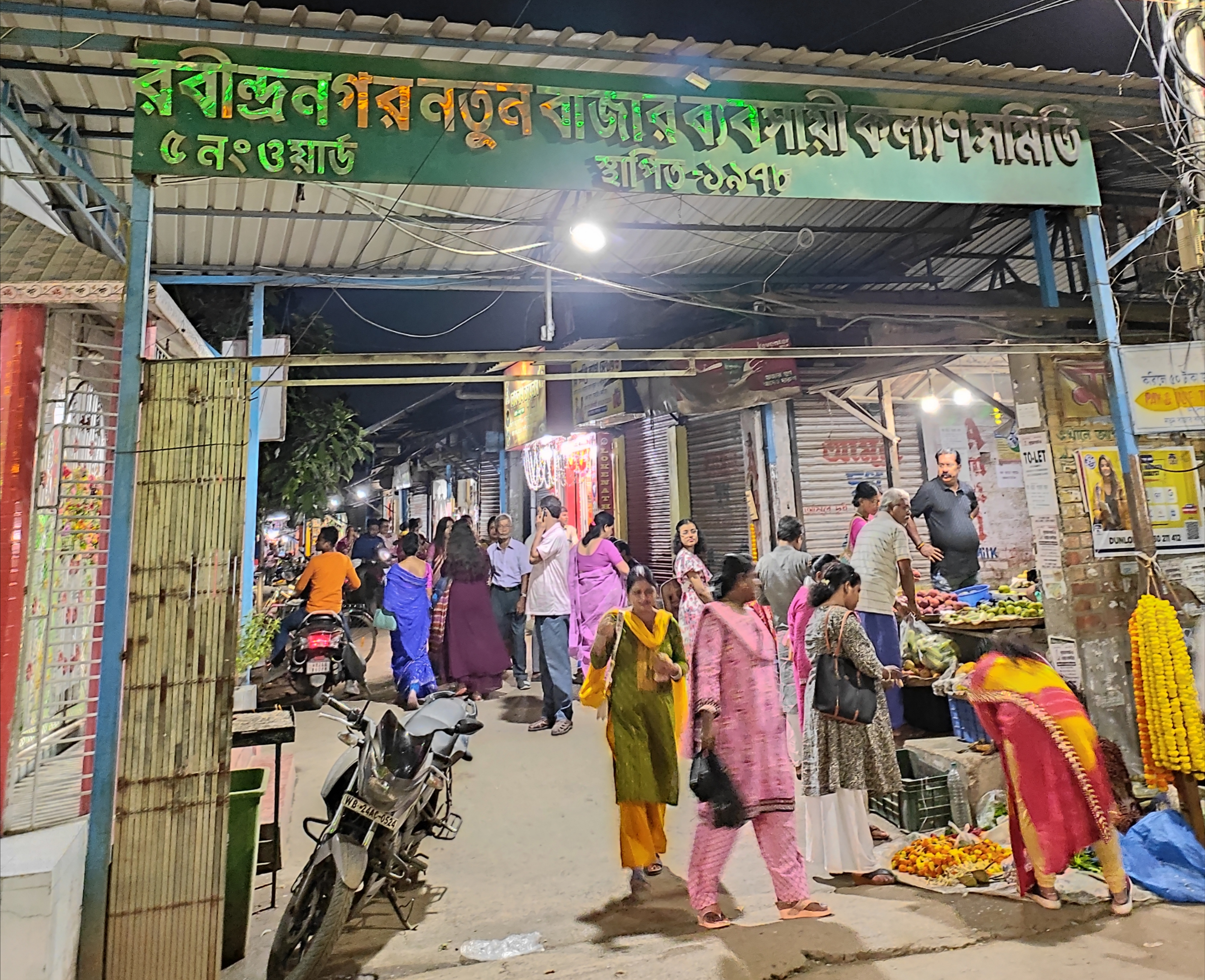
Rabindra Nagar Natun Bazar

Markets in or near Rabindra Nagar area are:

- Natun Bazar Market
- Gorabazar Market
