= South Dum Dum =

Neighbourhood of Kolkata, India

- City
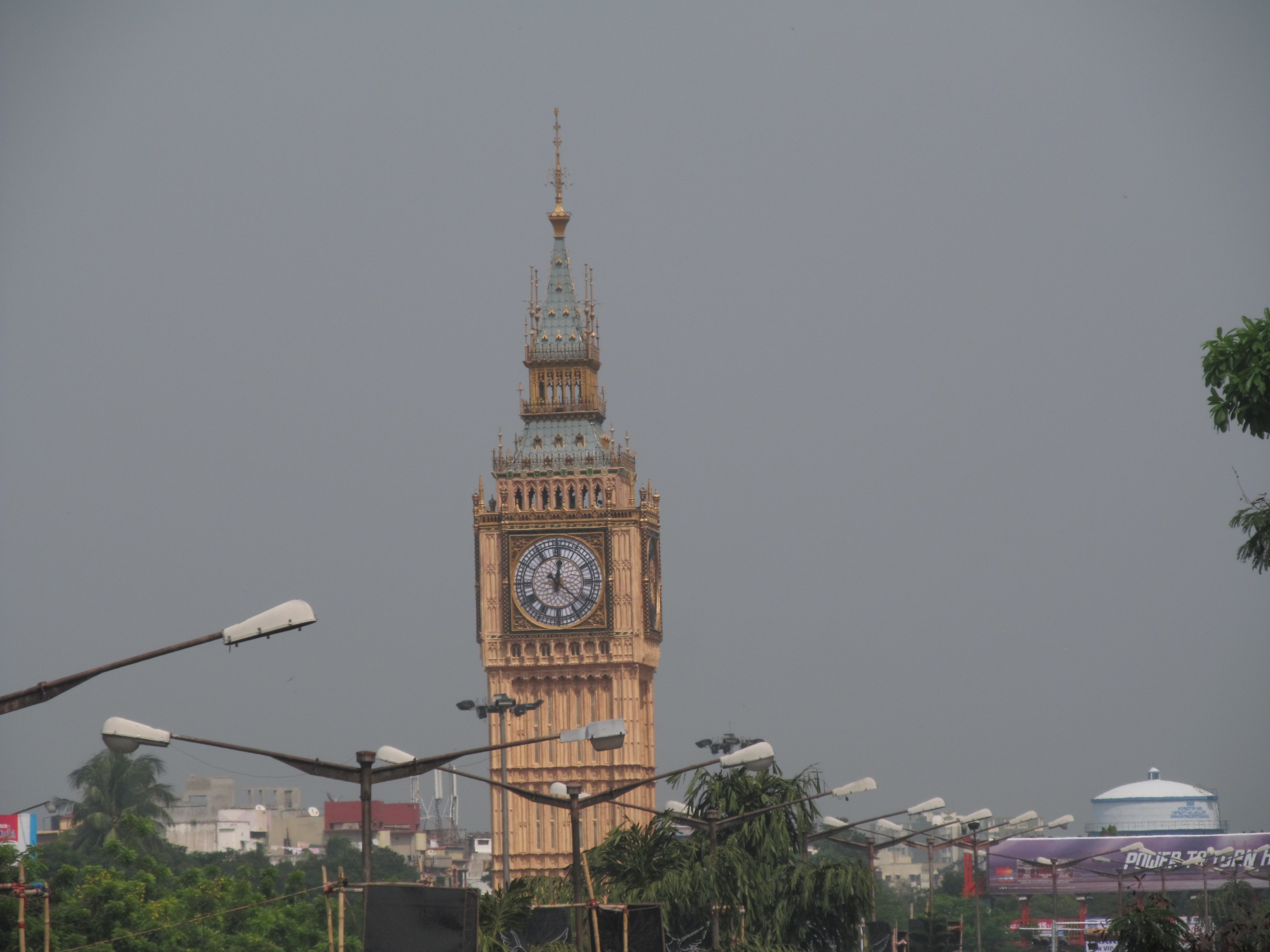
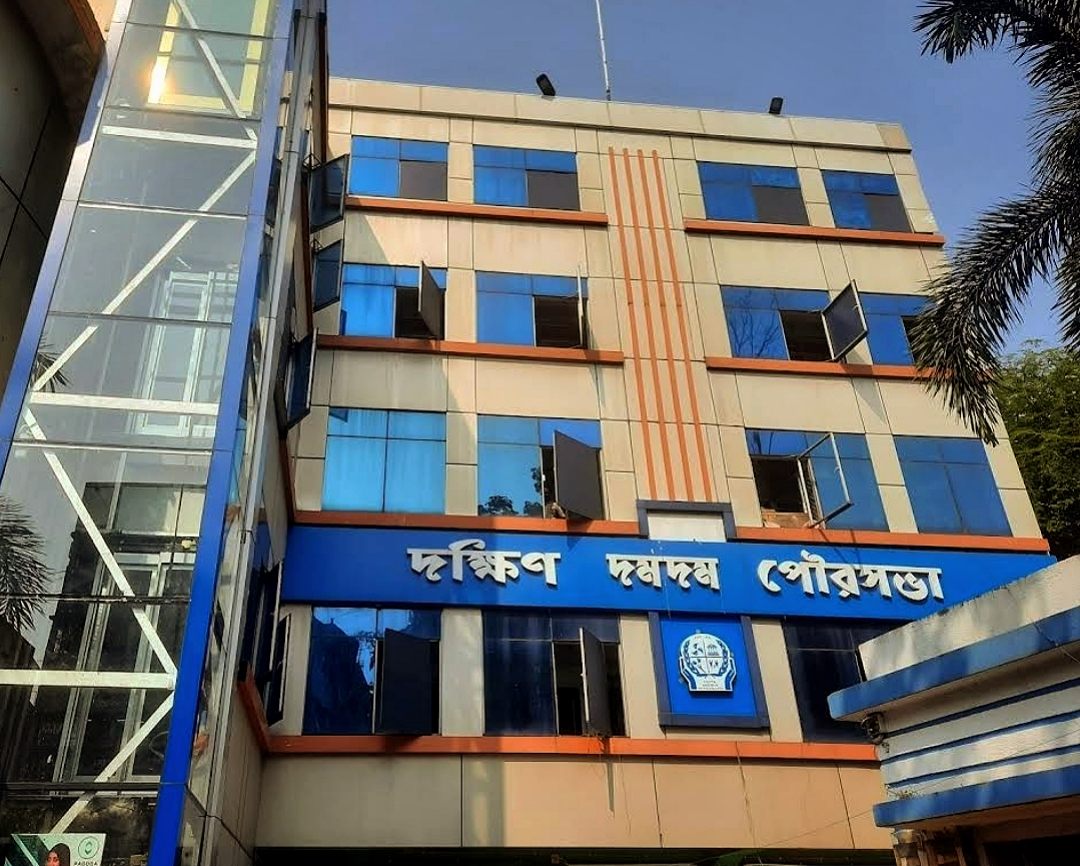
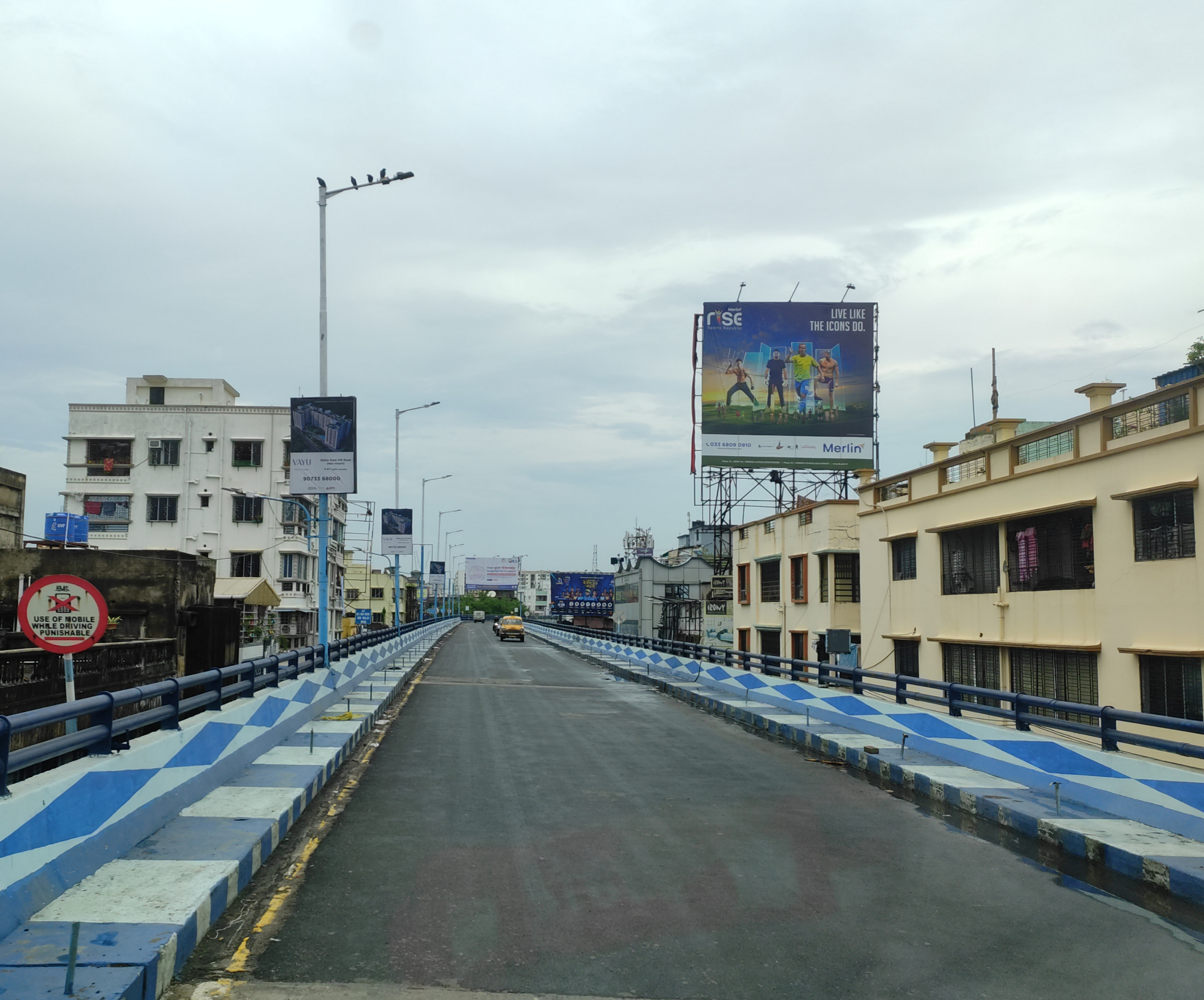
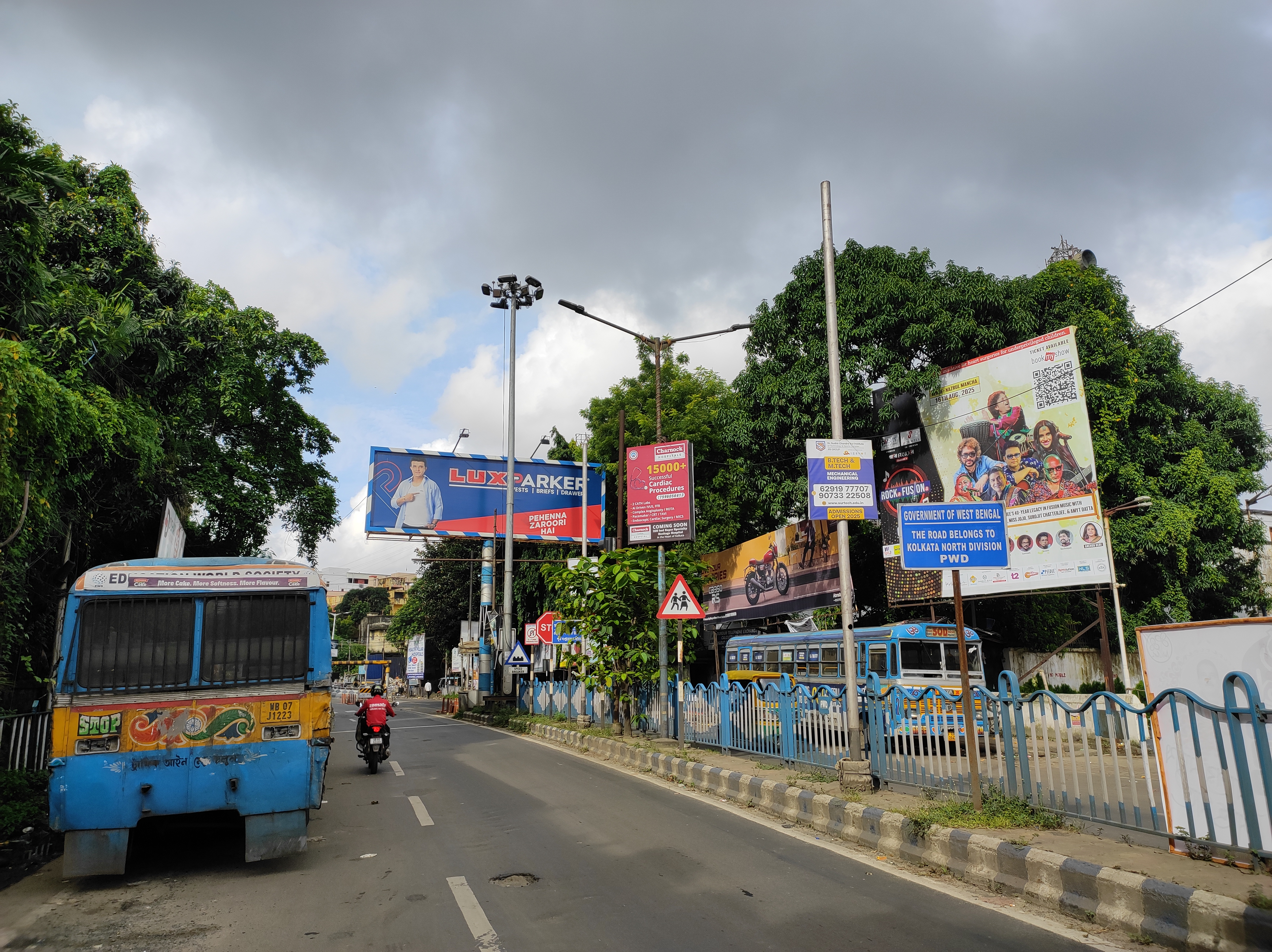
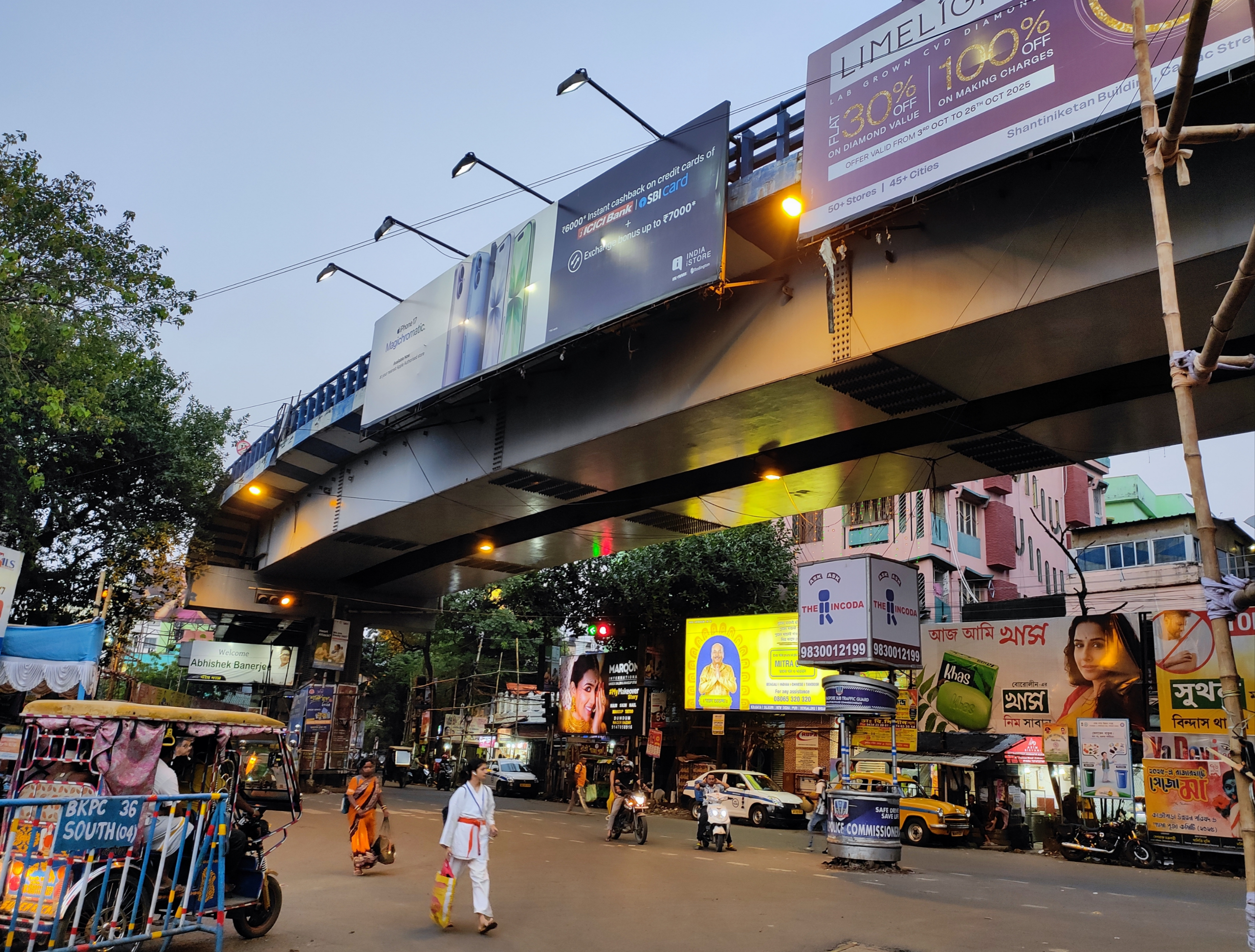
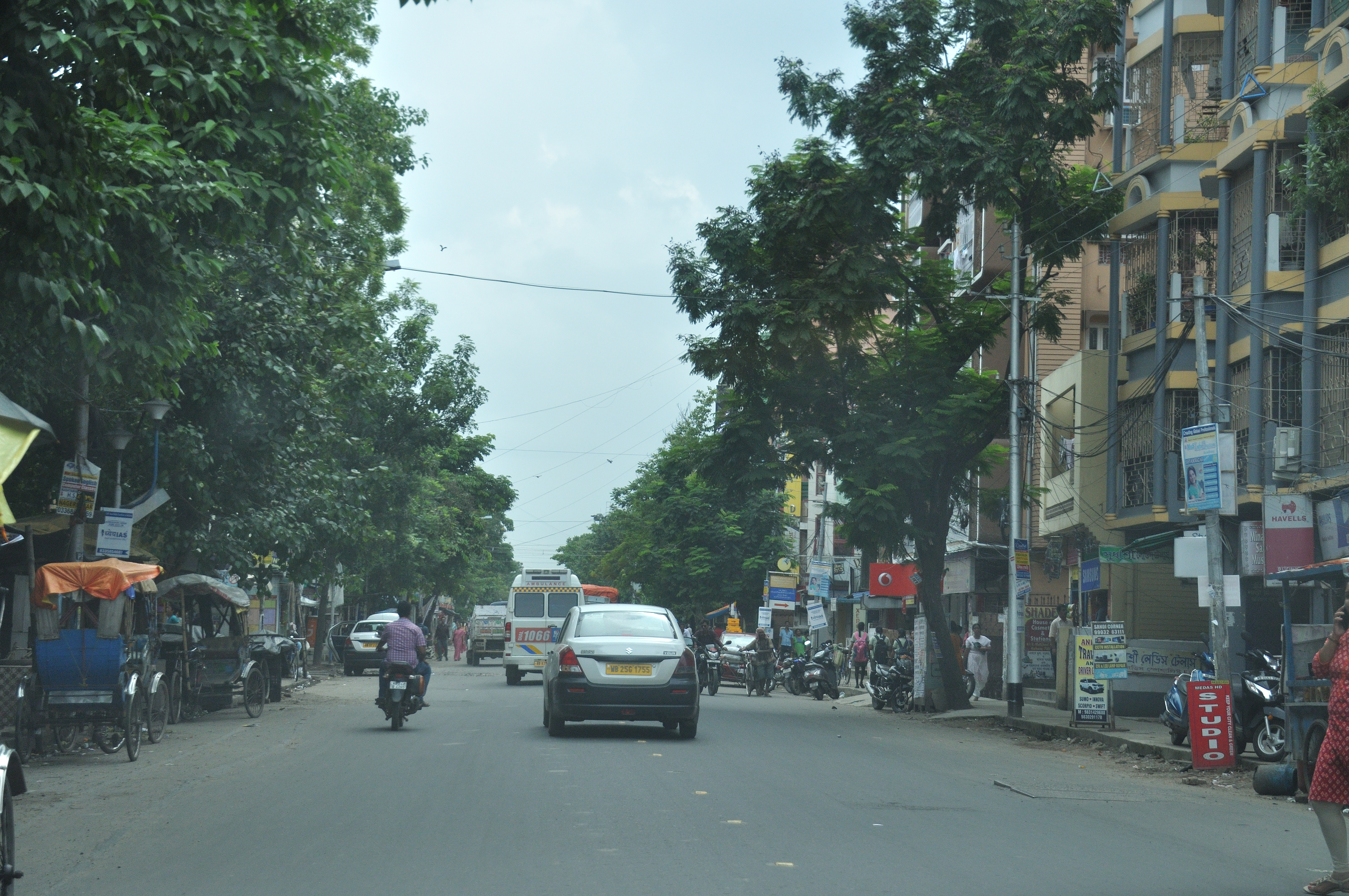
- Kolkata Time Zone Tower, Lake Town South Dum Dum Municipal Headquarters Nagerbazar Flyover Jessore Road Nagerbazar Crossing Dum Dum Road

- Location in Kolkata South Dum Dum (West Bengal) South Dum Dum (India)
- Coordinates: 22.61°N 88.40°E
- Country: India
- State: West Bengal
- Division: Presidency
- District: North 24 Parganas
- Metro Station: Belgachia; Dum Dum; Dum Dum Cantonment; Noapara
- Railway Station: Dum Dum Junction and Dum Dum Cantonment
- Established: 1870; 156 years ago (as South Dum Dum Municipality)

Government
  - Type: Municipality
  - Body: South Dum Dum Municipality
  - Chairman: Kasturi Chowdhury
  - Vice-Chairman: Netai Dutta

Area
  - Total: 13.54 km^{2} (5.23 sq mi)

Population (2011)
  - Total: 403,316
  - Density: 29,790/km^{2} (77,150/sq mi)

Languages
  - Official: Bengali, English
- Time zone: UTC+5:30 (IST)
- PIN: 700028, 700030, 700048, 700055, 700065, 700074, 700077, 700089
- Telephone code: +91 33
- Vehicle registration: WB
- Lok Sabha constituency: Dum Dum
- Vidhan Sabha constituency: Dum Dum, Bidhannagar, Rajarhat Gopalpur
- Website: sddm.ind.in

South Dum Dum is a city and a municipality in the Kolkata Metropolitan Area of North 24 Parganas district in the Indian state of West Bengal. It is a part of the area covered by Kolkata Metropolitan Development Authority (KMDA).

== Etymology ==
During the 19th century Dum Dum area was home to the Dum Dum Arsenal, a British Royal Artillery facility.

== History ==
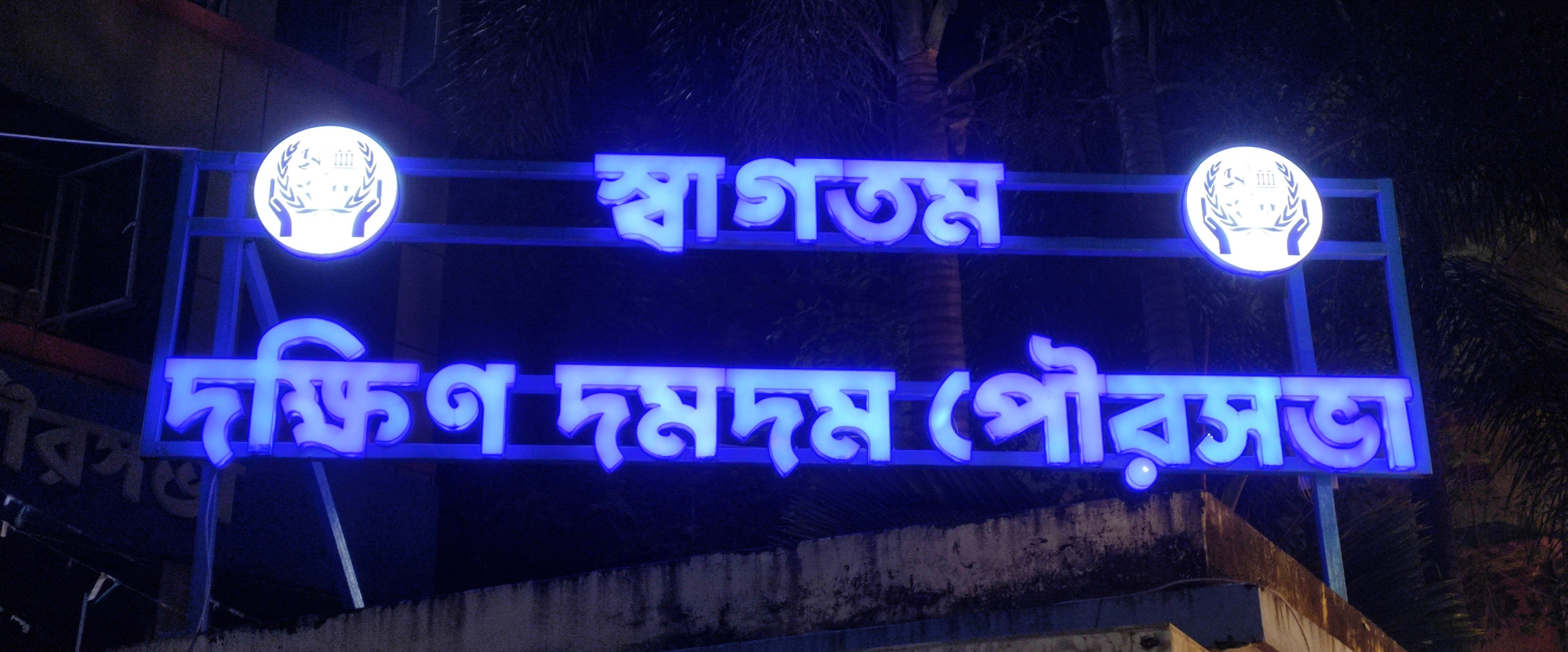

In 1870, Dum Dum was divided into two parts named as South Dum Dum and North Dum Dum. Though South Dum Dum Municipality was established on 3rd July, 1870.

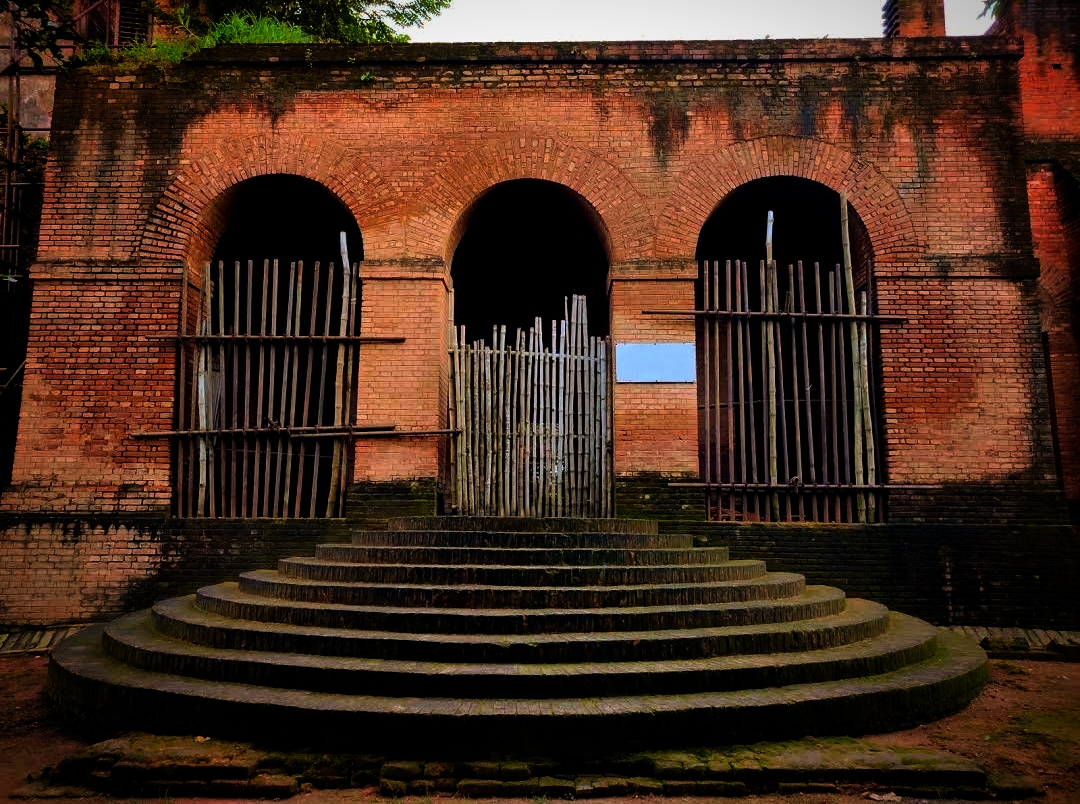
Clive House, Nagerbazar

Clive House on Rastraguru Avenue in Nagerbazar is mired in controversy. It is thought of as the first pucca brick and cement building in North Kolkata area and was possibly built by the Portuguese. Some say that it was the hunting lodge of an Indian prince or nobleman. What is known is that it was used by British soldiers when they first entered the country. Later, Robert Clive took the area over, renovated it, added a floor to the single-story building, and made it his country house around 1757-60. The house is located on raised ground in otherwise flat surroundings. When Clive House was excavated, a variety of artefacts were recovered, including coins, terracotta figures, sculptures, pottery and intelligence on a Portuguese fort. The articles found could be of the Sen period, or may alternatively have links with the ancient civilization unearthed earlier at Chandraketugarh. Clive House has been in the domain of the Archaeological Survey of India since 2004, but squatters inside and outside the structure have hindered restoration work.

With the partition of Bengal in 1947, "millions of refugees poured in from erstwhile East Pakistan." In the initial stages, the bulk of these refugees were non-agriculturists. A few of them made their own arrangements, but "it was squatters who made the East Bengali refugees famous or infamous." Squatting (jabardakhal in Bengali) ranged from the forcible occupation of barracks to the collective take-over of private, government, and wasteland. By 1949, there were a total of 65 refugee colonies in the Dum Dum and Panihati zones. The squatters were in a way "self-settlers" in the absence of adequate official arrangements for rehabilitation. Within a very short time, the refugees (quite often with government/administrative support) not only found a place to stay but developed a society that included markets, schools, temples and sometimes even colleges, hospitals and recreational centres.

== Geography ==
Cities and towns in the southern portion of Barrackpore subdivision in North 24 Parganas district
M: municipal city/ town, CT: census town,
N: neighbourhood/ administrative location
Owing to space constraints in the small map, the actual locations in a larger map may vary slightly

=== Location ===
South Dum Dum is located at 22.61°N 88.40°E.

South Dum Dum is bounded by North Dum Dum (Municipality) and Dum Dum (Municipality) on the north, Baguiati and adjacent areas of VIP Road on the east, Salt Lake on the south and Belgachia and Sinthee in Kolkata district and Baranagar (Municipality) on the west.

96% of the population of Barrackpore subdivision (partly presented in the map alongside, all places marked on the map are linked in the full screen map) lives in urban areas. In 2011, it had a density of population of 10,967 per km^{2}. The subdivision has 16 municipalities and 24 census towns.

=== Neighbourhoods ===
South Dum Dum consists of localities such as Nagerbazar, Satgachi, Amarpalli, Motijheel, Laxminagar, Bandhab Nagar, Golpark, Purba Sinthee, Subhas Nagar, Bediapara, Rabindra Nagar, Jheel Bagan, Basak Bagan, Seth Bagan, Jawpur, Kalindi, Patipukur, Dakshindari, Dum Dum Park, Bangur Avenue, Lake Town, Shyamnagar, Naskar Bagan, Green Park and Mathkal.

=== Police station ===
Dum Dum police station under Barrackpore Police Commissionerate has jurisdiction over South Dum Dum municipal areas.

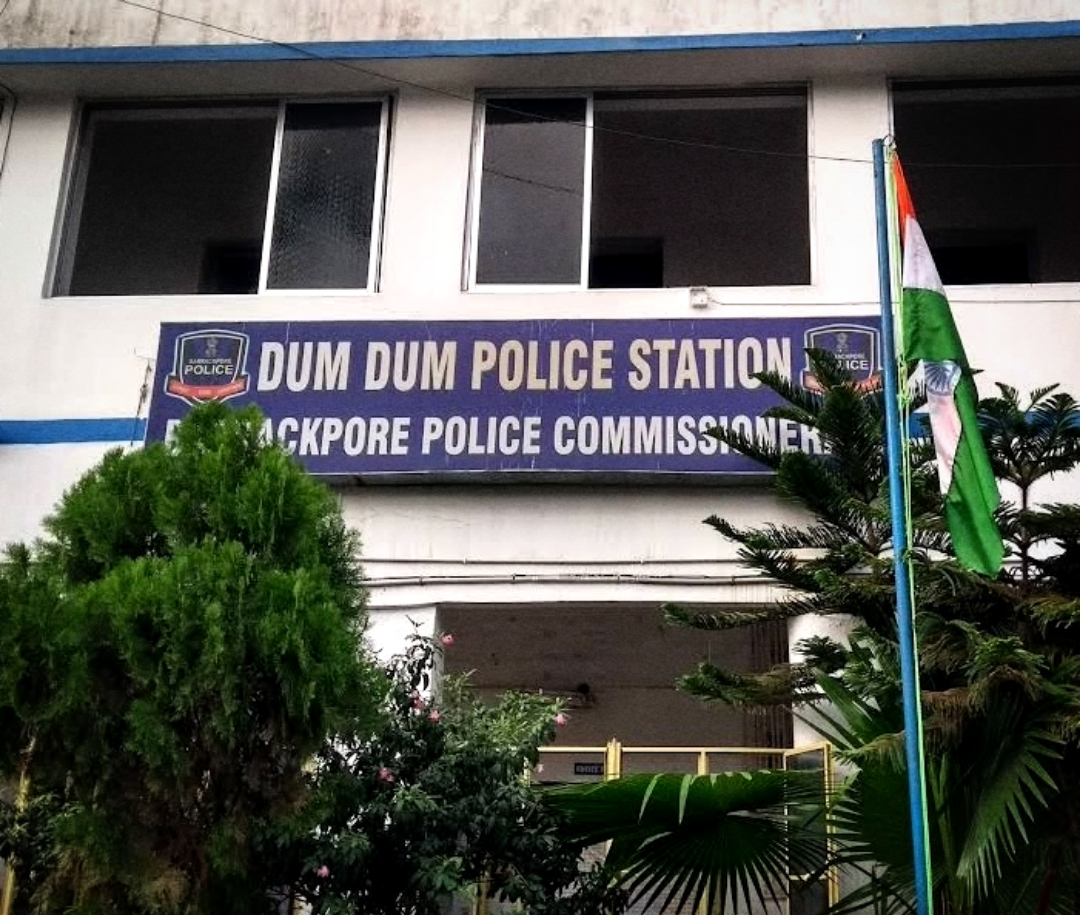
Dum Dum police station

Lake Town police station under Bidhannagar Police Commissionerate also has jurisdiction over parts of South Dum Dum municipal areas.

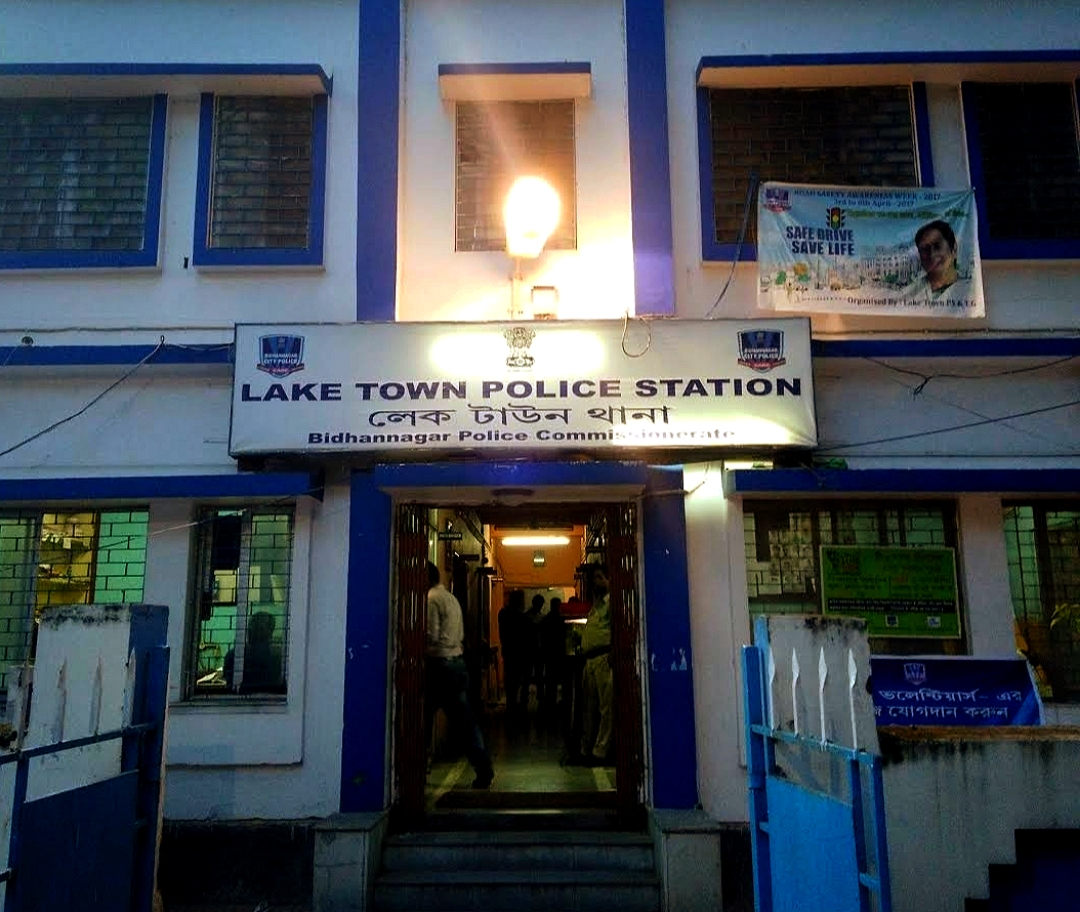
Lake Town police station

Newly established Nagerbazar police station under Barrackpore Police Commissionerate also has jurisdiction over parts of South Dum Dum municipal areas.

=== Post Offices ===
South Dum Dum is a vast locality with many Postal Index Numbers:

Purba Sinthee has a non-delivery sub post office, with PIN 700030. Other post offices with the same PIN are Sethbagan and Ghughudanga.

Rabindra Nagar has a delivery sub post office, with PIN 700065. Other post office with the same PIN is Subhas Nagar and Health Institute.

Bediapara has a delivery sub post office, with PIN 700077.

Nagerbazar has a non-delivery sub-post office, with PIN 700028. Jugipara Satgachi is another post office with the same PIN.

Motijheel has a delivery sub post office, with PIN 700074. Other post offices with the same PIN are Dum Dum Road and Jawpore.

Dum Dum Park has a non-delivery sub post office, with PIN 700055. Other post offices with the same PIN are Bangur Avenue and Shyamnagar.

Lake Town has a delivery sub-post office, with PIN 700089. Another post office with the same PIN is Kalindi Housing Estate.

Patipukur has a non-delivery sub-post office, with PIN 700048. Other post offices with the same PIN are Sreebhumi and Sadhana Ausudhalaya Road (Dakshindari).

== Demographics ==
Population of South Dum Dum
Year	Pop.	±%
1901	10,904	—
1911	12,874	+18.1%
1921	14,030	+9.0%
1931	18,471	+31.7%
1941	25,838	+39.9%
1951	61,391	+137.6%
1961	111,284	+81.3%
1971	174,342	+56.7%
1981	230,266	+32.1%
1991	232,811	+1.1%
2001	392,444	+68.6%
2011	403,316	+2.8%

=== Population ===
As per the 2011 Census of India, South Dum Dum had a total population of 403,316, of which 202,214 (50%) were males and 201,102 (50%) were females. Population below 6 years was 28,703. The total number of literates in South Dum Dum was 344,971 (92.09% of the population over 6 years).

As of 2001 India census, South Dumdum had a population of 392,150. Males constitute 51% of the population and females 49%. South Dum Dum has an average literacy rate of 83%, higher than the national average of 59.5%: male literacy is 87%, and female literacy is 80%. In South Dum Dum, 8% of the population is under 6 years of age.

=== Kolkata Urban Agglomeration ===
The following Municipalities, Census Towns and other locations in Barrackpore subdivision were part of Kolkata Urban Agglomeration in the 2011 census: Kanchrapara (M), Jetia (CT), Halisahar (M), Balibhara (CT), Naihati (M), Bhatpara (M), Kaugachhi (CT), Garshyamnagar (CT), Garulia (M), Ichhapur Defence Estate (CT), North Barrackpur (M), Barrackpur Cantonment (CB), Barrackpore (M), Jafarpur (CT), Ruiya (CT), Titagarh (M), Khardaha (M), Bandipur (CT), Panihati (M), Muragachha (CT) New Barrackpore (M), Chandpur (CT), Talbandha (CT), Patulia (CT), Kamarhati (M), Baranagar (M), South Dum Dum (M), North Dumdum (M), Dum Dum (M), Noapara (CT), Babanpur (CT), Teghari (CT), Nanna (OG), Chakla (OG), Srotribati (OG) and Panpur (OG).

=== Languages ===
Languages spoken in South Dumdum City (2011)
1. Bengali (81.8%)
2. Hindi (15.1%)
3. Urdu (0.89%)
4. Marwari (0.81%)
5. Odia (0.36%)
6. Others (1.19%)

== Economy ==
- The Wesman Engineering Company Ltd.

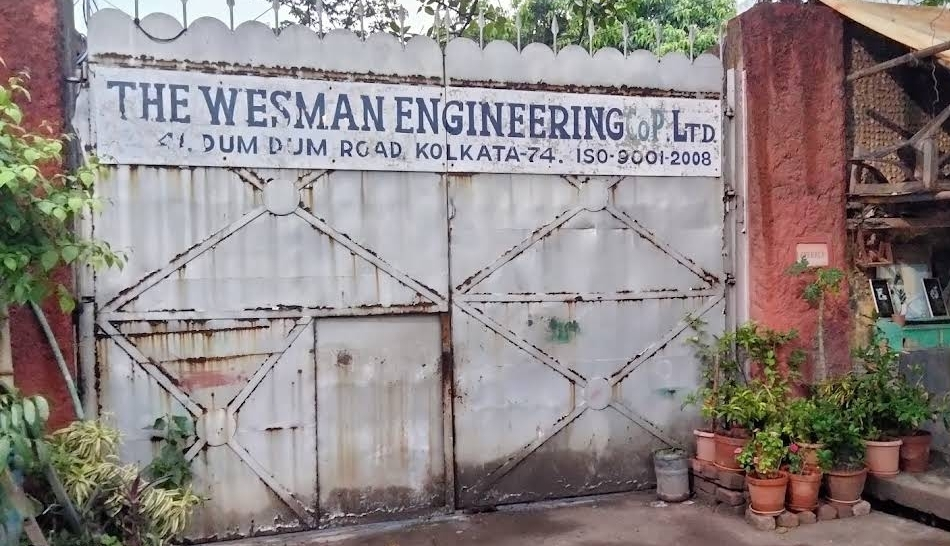
Wesman Engineering Co Ltd, Dum Dum Road

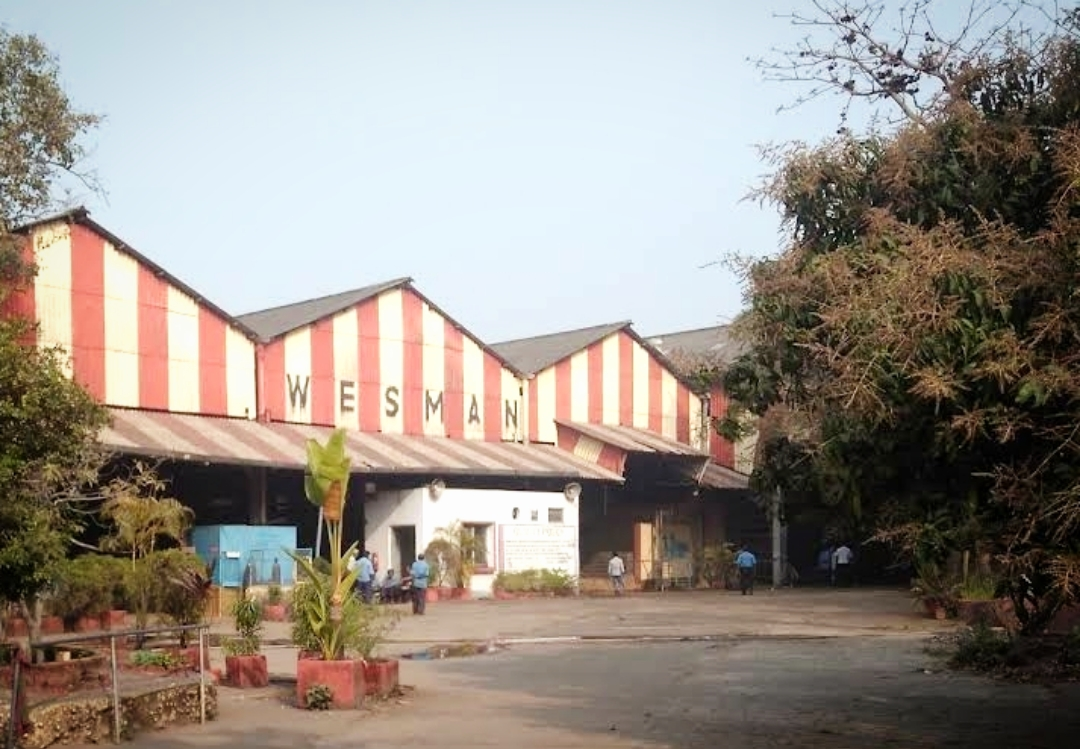
Wesman Engineering Ltd. Workshop

- Gluconate Health Limited

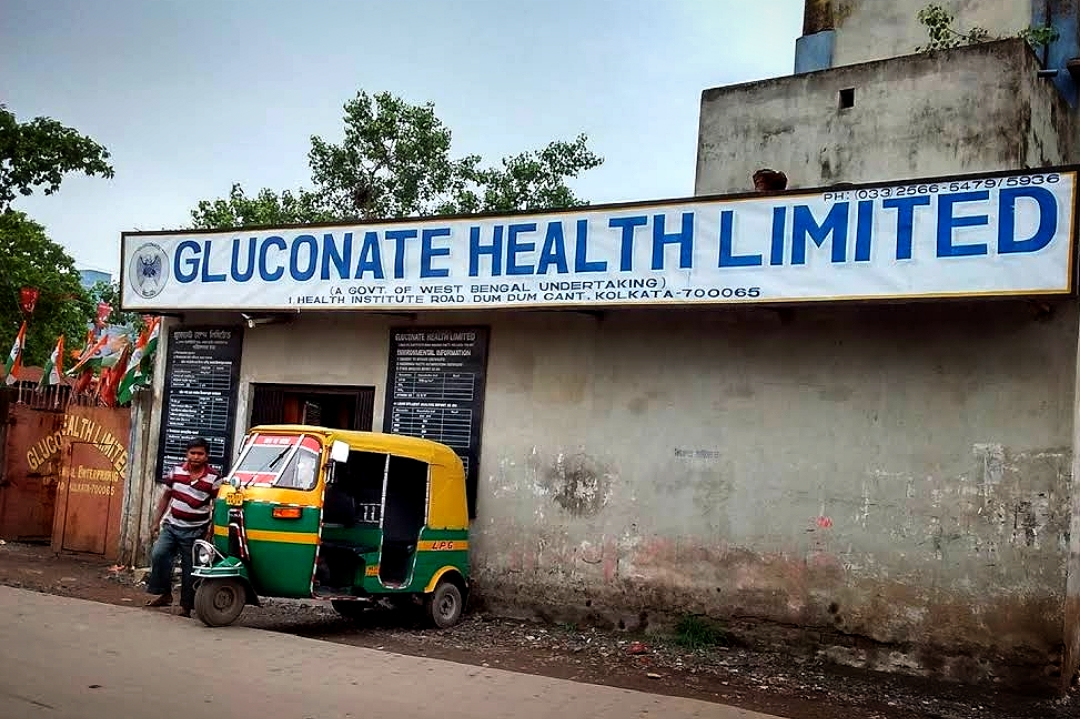
Gluconate Health Ltd, Health Inst. Rd, Dum Dum Cantonment

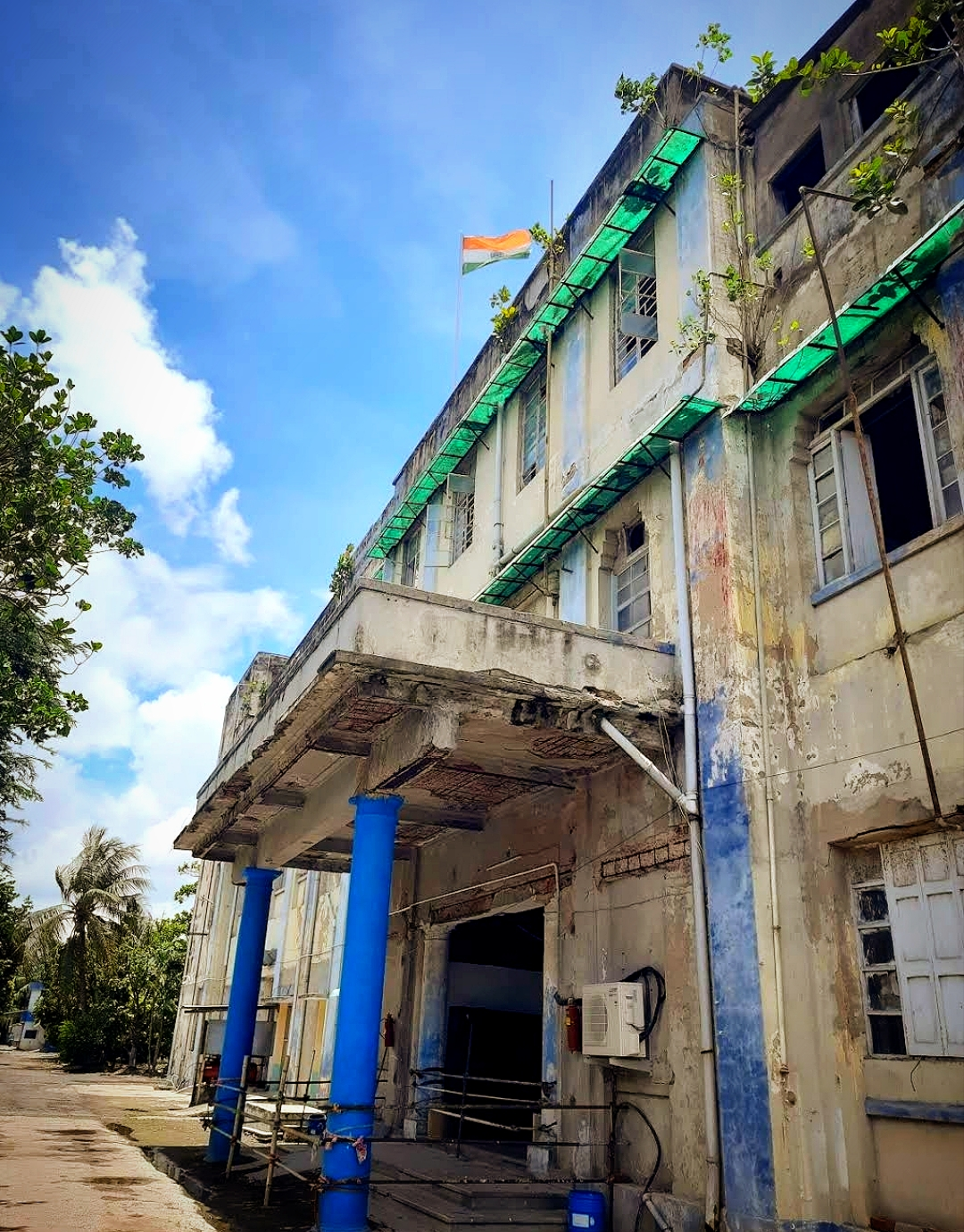
Gluconate Health Ltd. Admin Building

- Saltee Plaza (Commercial Complex)

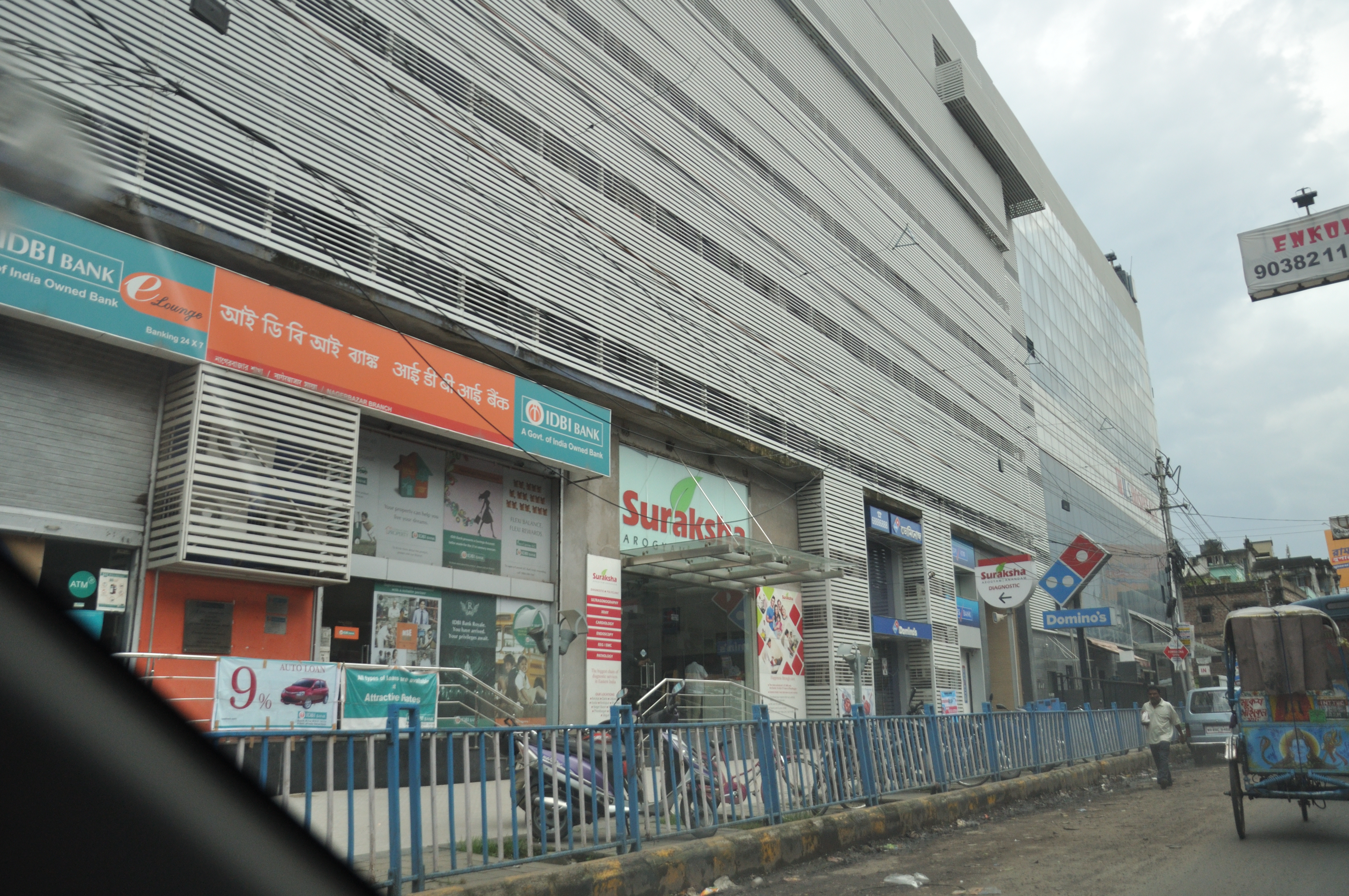
Saltee Plaza, Nagerbazar

=== KMDA ===
South Dum Dum municipality is included in the Kolkata Metropolitan Area for which the KMDA is the statutory planning and development authority.

== Education ==
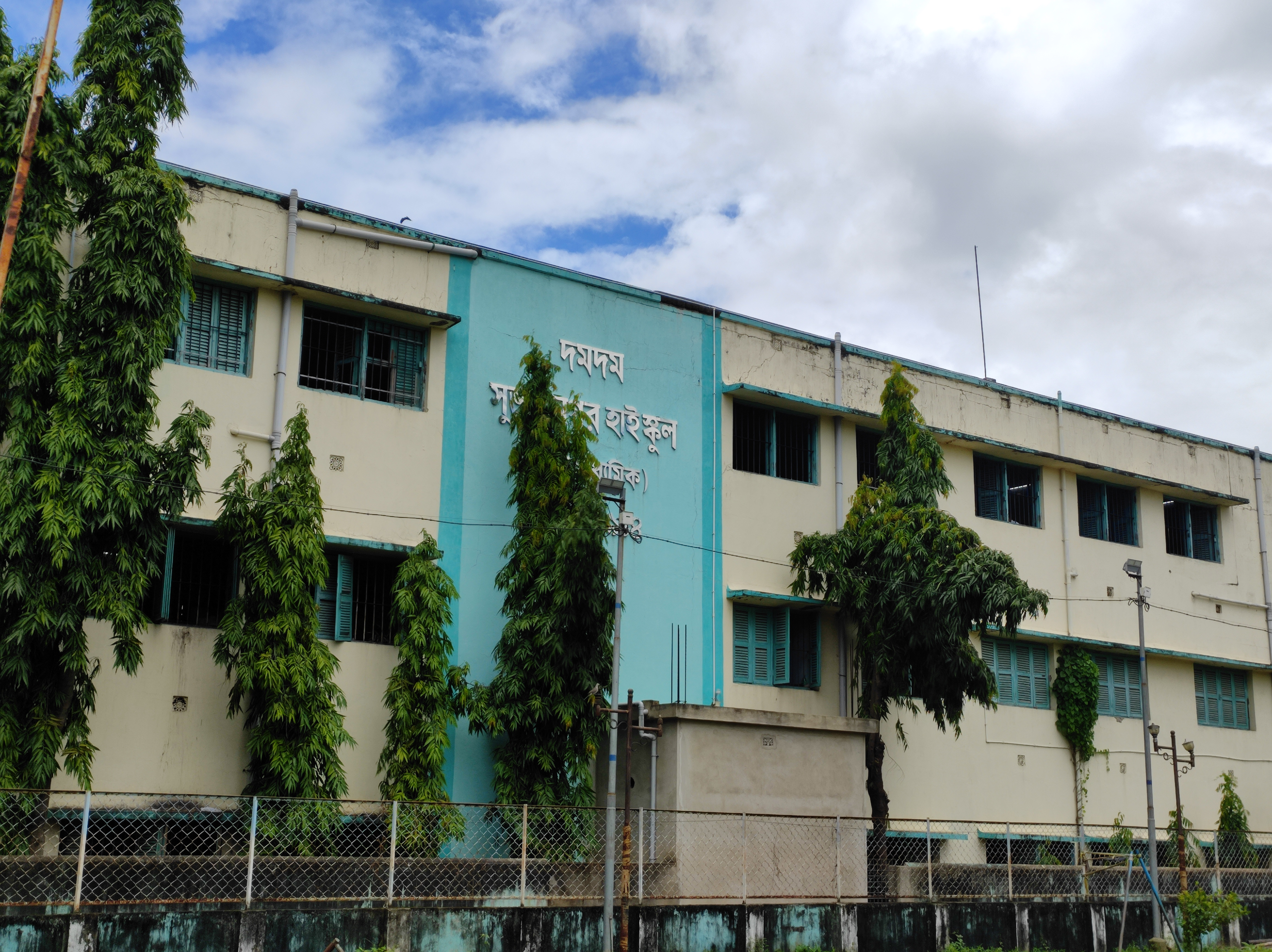
Dum Dum Subhas Nagar High School

The following institutions are located in South Dum Dum:

- Dum Dum Motijheel College was established in Dum Dum in 1950. The college runs in two shifts. The women's section has classes in the morning and the coeducational section has classes during the day. Both the sections offer various subjects. The college has a post graduate unit in M.Sc. mathematics and M.A. English. It offers a vocational course in instrumentation.
- Dum Dum Motijheel Rabindra Mahavidyalaya was established at Dum Dum in 1968.It was started as an evening college in commerce, became a day college in commerce in 1974 and finally a general day college, with arts, science, and commerce courses, in 2004. It offers B.Com (Hons) in marketing, geography honours in B.Sc. and Journalism honours in B.A.
- East Calcutta Girls' College, Lake Town, was established in 1992. It is a women's college in Kolkata and offers undergraduate courses in commerce, arts and sciences. It is affiliated to West Bengal State University. Until 2008, the college was affiliated to Calcutta University.
- Ramakrishna Sarada Mission Vivekananda Vidyabhavan was established by Ramakrishna Sarada Mission at Dum Dum in 1961. It is a partly residential college for women. It offers honours courses in Bengali, English, Sanskrit, education, history, philosophy, political science, sociology, journalism & mass communication, economics and geography.
- Indian College of Arts and Draftsmanship, was established at Dum Dum in 1893. It offers courses in painting, applied arts, sculpture and graphics. It is affiliated with Rabindra Bharati University.
- Dum Dum Krishna Kumar Hindu Academy, at Motijheel Avenue, Amarpalli, is a boys only Bengali-medium higher secondary school. It has arrangements for teaching from Classes VI – XII. It was established in 1933.
- Dum Dum Kishore Bharati High School, Motijheel Avenue, in Ward No. 9, South Dum Dum Municipality, is a boys only Bengali-medium higher secondary school. It has arrangements for teaching from Classes VI – XII. It was established in 1965.
- Dum Dum Motijheel Girls' High School, at Dum Dum Road, is a girls’ only high school, under WB board, providing higher secondary education.
- Dum Dum Prachya Banimandir for Boys and Dum Dum Prachya Banimandir for Girls at Seth Bagan. Schools are different for both genders and is a higher secondary school.
- Dum Dum Sree Arabinda Vidyamandir at Khudiram Colony is a co-educational higher secondary school.
- Patipukur Girls' High School, Estd. in 1957, is a girls' higher secondary school at Patipukur.
- Patipukur Pallisree Vidyalaya Higher secondary School, Estd. in 1964, is a co-educational higher secondary school at Patipukur.
- Patipukur Adyanath Siksha Mandir, Estd. in 1950, is a co-educational higher secondary school at Patipukur.
- Laketown Govt. Sponsored Girls' High School, Estd. in 1974, is a girls higher secondary school at Lake Town.
- NarainDass Bangur Memorial Multipurpose School, Estd. in 1966, is a boys higher secondary school at Bangur Avenue.
- Krishnapur Adarsha Vidyamandir and Krishnapur Adarsha Vidyamandir for Girls, at Dum Dum Park, in Ward No. 28, are Bengali-medium higher secondary schools. It has facilities for teaching in Classes VI to XII. It was established in 1954.
- Sahid Rameswar Vidyamandir, Estd. in 1950, Jessore Road, Amarpalli, is a co-educational, higher secondary school.
- Seth Bagan Adarsha Vidyamandir, Estd. in 1950, is a co-educational, higher secondary school at Seth Bagan.
- Laxminagar High School, Estd. in 1966, is a secondary school at Laxminagar.
- Dr. B.C Roy Vidyamandir is an English medium co-educational secondary school at Jawpur Rd, Dum Dum.
- Ghughudanga Bharati Vidyamandir, Estd. in 1970, is a co-educational secondary school at Dum Dum Purba Sinthee.
- Christ Church Girls' High School, Jessore Road, is a Bengali-medium, girls only school preparing students for madhyamik and higher secondary examination of the West Bengal boards. Established in 1882, it has arrangements for teaching from Infant to Class XII. Admission for Primary section starts around December. It has hostel facilities.
- St. Mary's Orphanage & Day School, Kolkata was initially set up by Christian Brothers from Ireland at Murgighata in Calcutta in 1848 and shifted to Dum Dum Road in 1947. It is a boys only institution and prepares students for the ICSE and ISC examinations.
- Dum Dum Subhas Nagar High School and
  Dum Dum Subhas Nagar Girls High School, Estd. in 1954 and 1955 respectively, are oldest and reputed higher secondary schools at Subhas Nagar, Dum Dum Cantonment.
- Dum Dum Deshbandhu High School is a primary and higher secondary school at Subhas Nagar Bye Lane, South Subhas Nagar, Dum Dum Cantonment.
- Assembly of God Church School, Dum Dum was set up by Assembly of God Mission in Dum Dum area at Surya Sen Pally, Dum Dum Cantonment.
- Dum Dum Bapuji Colony Adarsha Buniadi Vidyamandir is a government sponsored co-educational secondary school at Satgachi, Dum Dum.
- Dum Dum Sarvodaya Balika Vidyapith is a govt. sponsored girls secondary school at Satgachi, Dum Dum.
- Dum Dum Vivekananda Vidyalaya is a govt. sponsored co-educational secondary school at Nagendra Nath Rd, Nagerbazar.
- Uttar Rabindranagar Vivekananda High School, Estd. in 1964, is a co-educational higher secondary school at Vivekananda Pally, Rabindra Nagar, Dum Dum Cantonment.
- Shibtala Adarsha High School is a co-educational high school at Laxmi Narayan Rd, P.O Rabindra Nagar, Dum Dum Cantonment.
- Bediapara Monomohit Vidyapith High is a co-educational higher secondary school at Dum Dum Bediapara.
- Nalanda English Day High School is a co-educational English medium self-financed higher secondary school at Nagerbazar.
- North Kolkata Public High School is a co-educational English medium self-financed higher secondary school at Dum Dum Rd.
- Indira Gandhi Memorial Senior Secondary School is a co-educational English medium self-financed higher secondary school at Sreebhumi.
- St. Stephen's School, Dum Dum established in 1971, is a co-educational English Medium higher secondary school under Barrackpore Diocesan Education Society. It is affiliated to CISCE. Out of its multiple branches throughout West Bengal, it has two of them in Dum Dum; namely Wesley Primary Department and Main Branch.
- Dr. Sudhir Chandra Sur Institute of Technology & Sports Complex is a private engineering college owned by JIS Group, offering various technology courses in different engineering disciplines. It is currently affiliated to MAKAUT.

== Healthcare ==
Hospitals:

- South Dum Dum Maternity Home functions with 15 beds.
- South Dum Dum Municipal Hospital (near South Dum Dum Municipality), Nagerbazar.
- Dum Dum Medical Centre (3A Pollock Avenue, Kolkata 700080) is a multi-speciality hospital at Dum Dum.
- ILS Hospital (near Nagerbazar Flyover) is a 120-bed multi-speciality hospital. It offers 14 surgical facilities and 2 speciality clinics – bariatric (weight-loss) and diabetic.
- Gandhi Seva Sadan Hospital, Gandhi More, 207/1, S K Deb Road, (Shreebhumi) Kolkata 700048, (CT Scan, Digital X-ray, Ultrasonography with Colour Doppler, Cardiology Diagnosis with TMT, Halter Study, Echocardiography, ECG and Spirometry, Dialysis units, Pediatric Ward, Surgical Unit complete with Operation Theatres, Post-Operative Recovery, Geriatric ward, etc)
- Dakshindari Hospital (Nehru colony, Dakshindari, Kolkata 700048) is a hospital aided by South Dum Dum Municipality.
- Dafodil Hospitals (Sreebhumi, Lake Town, Kolkata 700048) is a multi-speciality hospital.

A new municipality hospital is under construction, located on Jessore Road, near Shyamnagar Bus stop. Though the work is halted for many years due to some issues.

== Culture ==
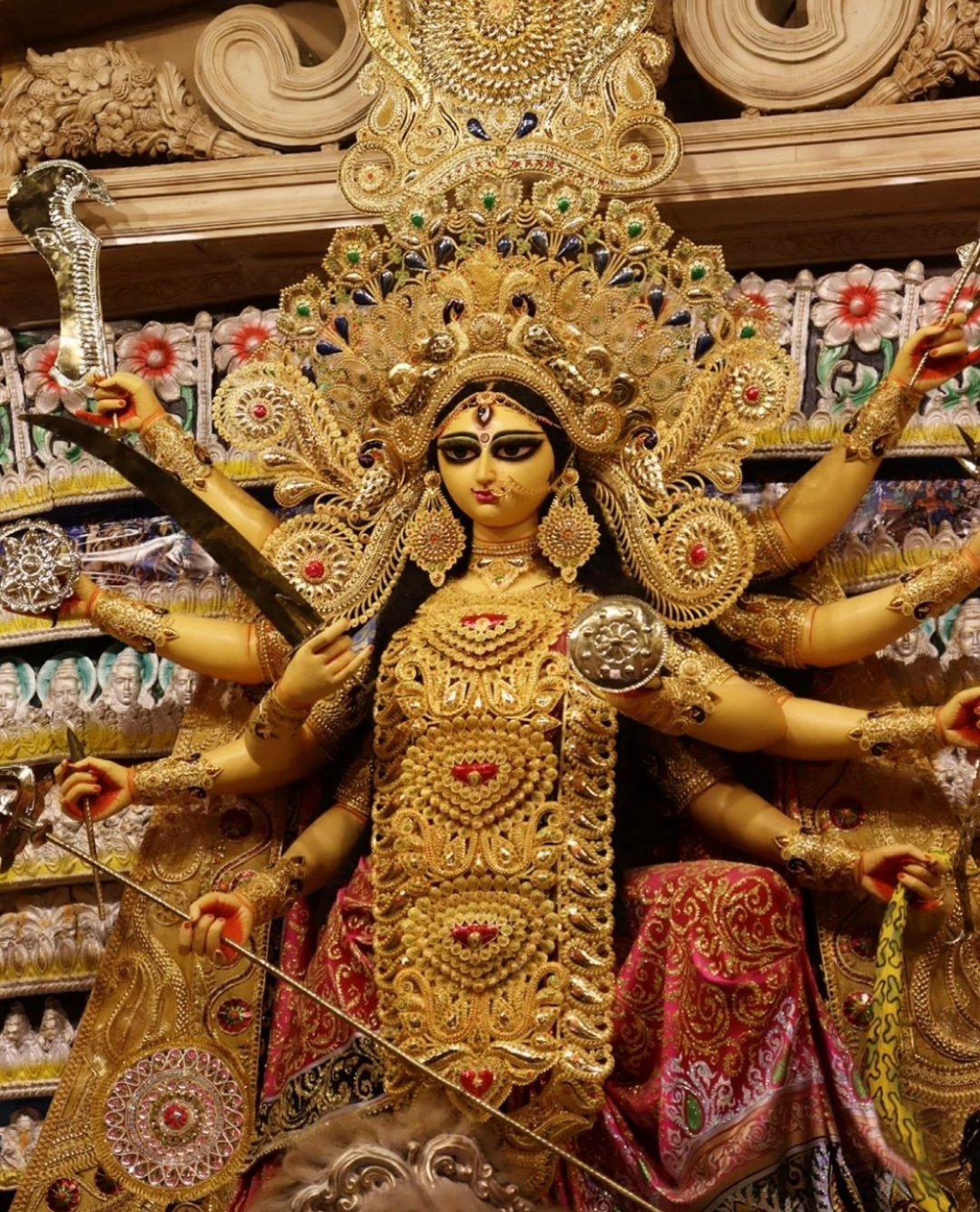
Sreebhumi Sporting Club 2022

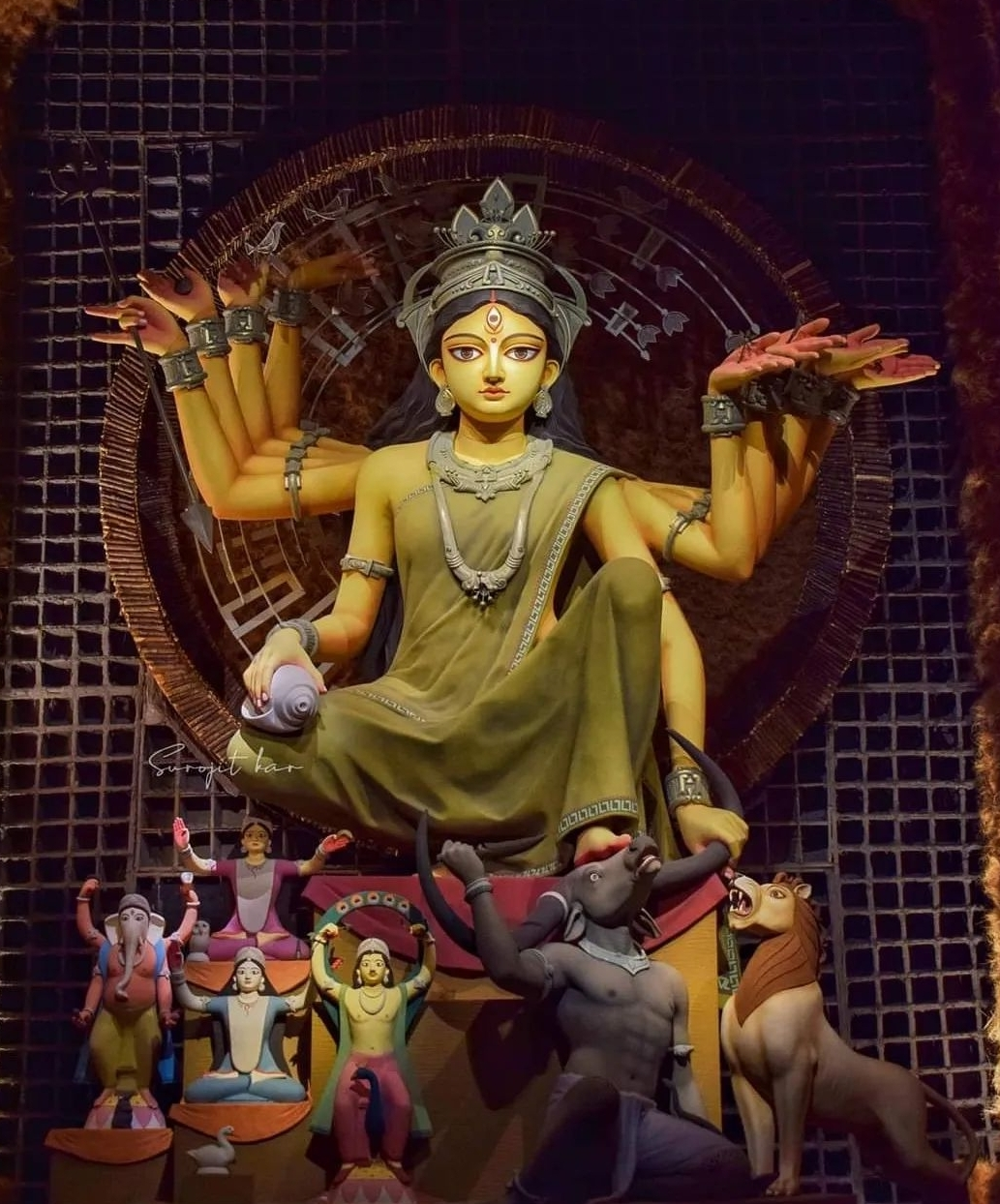
Dum Dum Park Tarun Sangha 2023

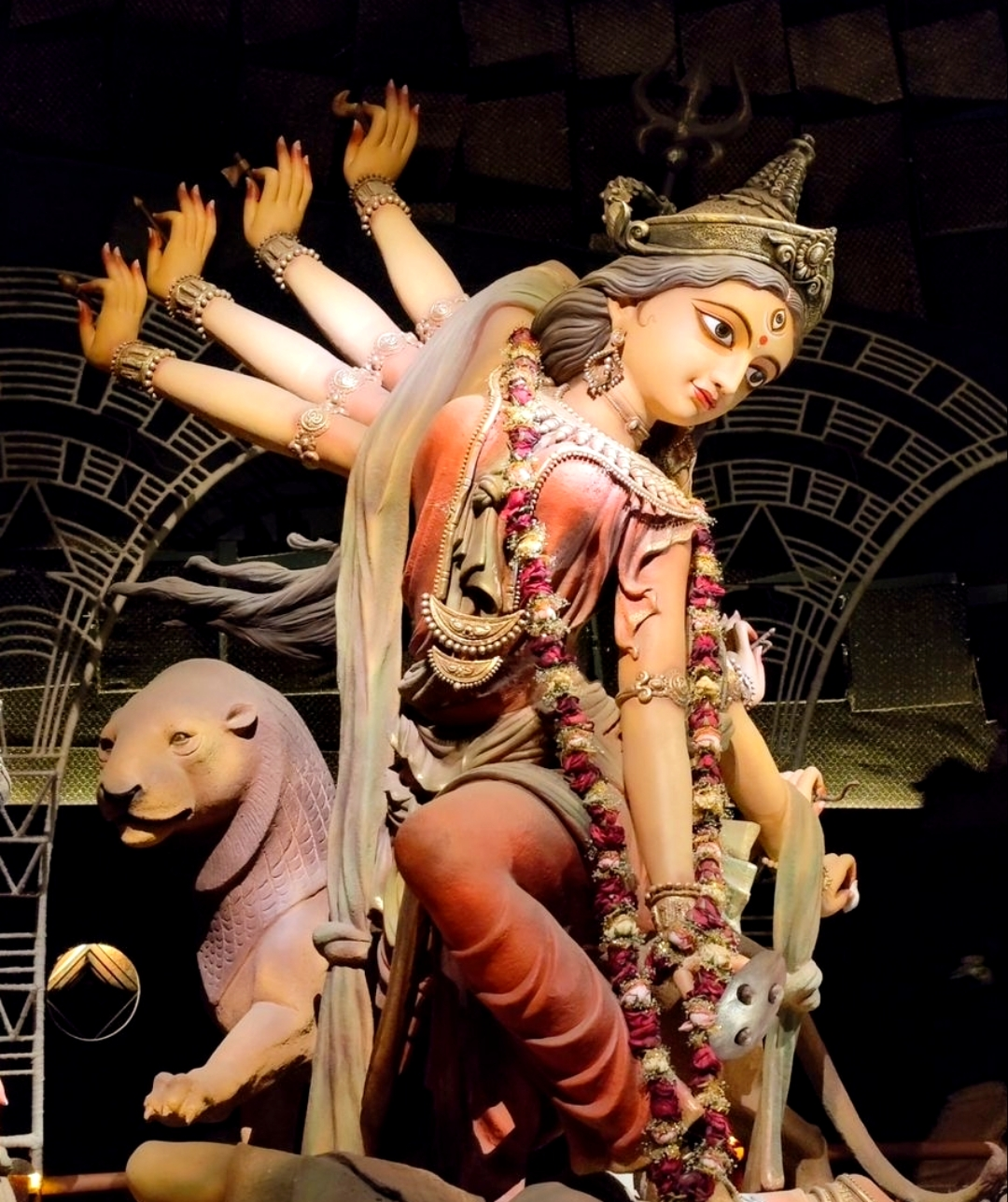
Dum Dum Dakshinpara Durgotsab 2024

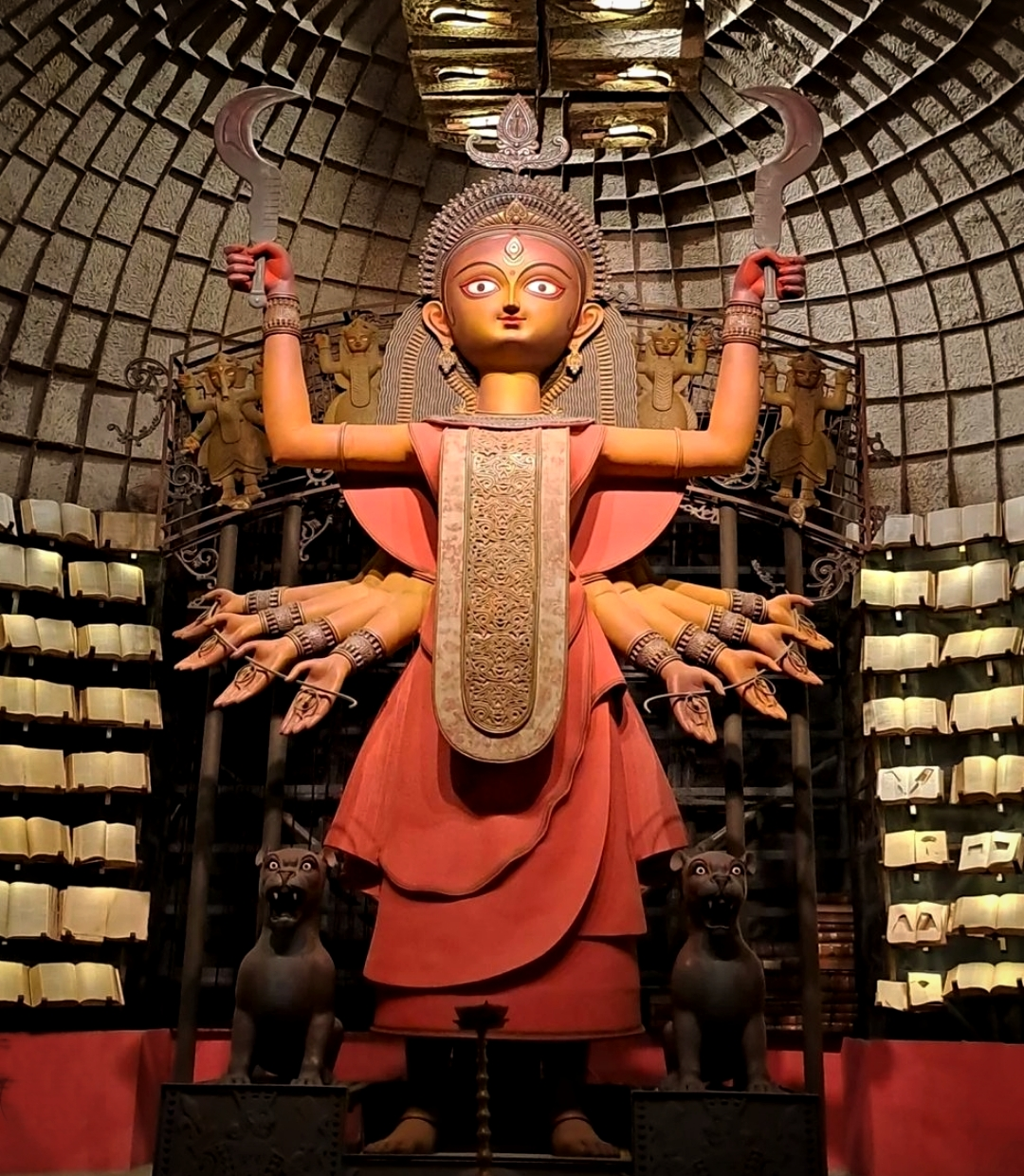
Dum Dum Park Tarun Dal 2023

In recent years, the multiple elaborate and innovative themed Durga Puja of Kolkata are organised by various organizations like Sreebhumi Sporting Club, Dum Dum Park Tarun Sangha, Dum Dum Park Bharat Chakra, Dum Dum Park Tarun Dal, Dum Dum Park Sarbojanin Durga Puja Samity, Dum Dum Park Yubak Brinda, Lake Town Adhibasi Brindo, Netaji Sporting Club Lake Town, Dakshinpara Durgotsab committee and others. They draw several visitors to the area during Durga Puja.

== Markets ==
Major markets in South Dumdum:

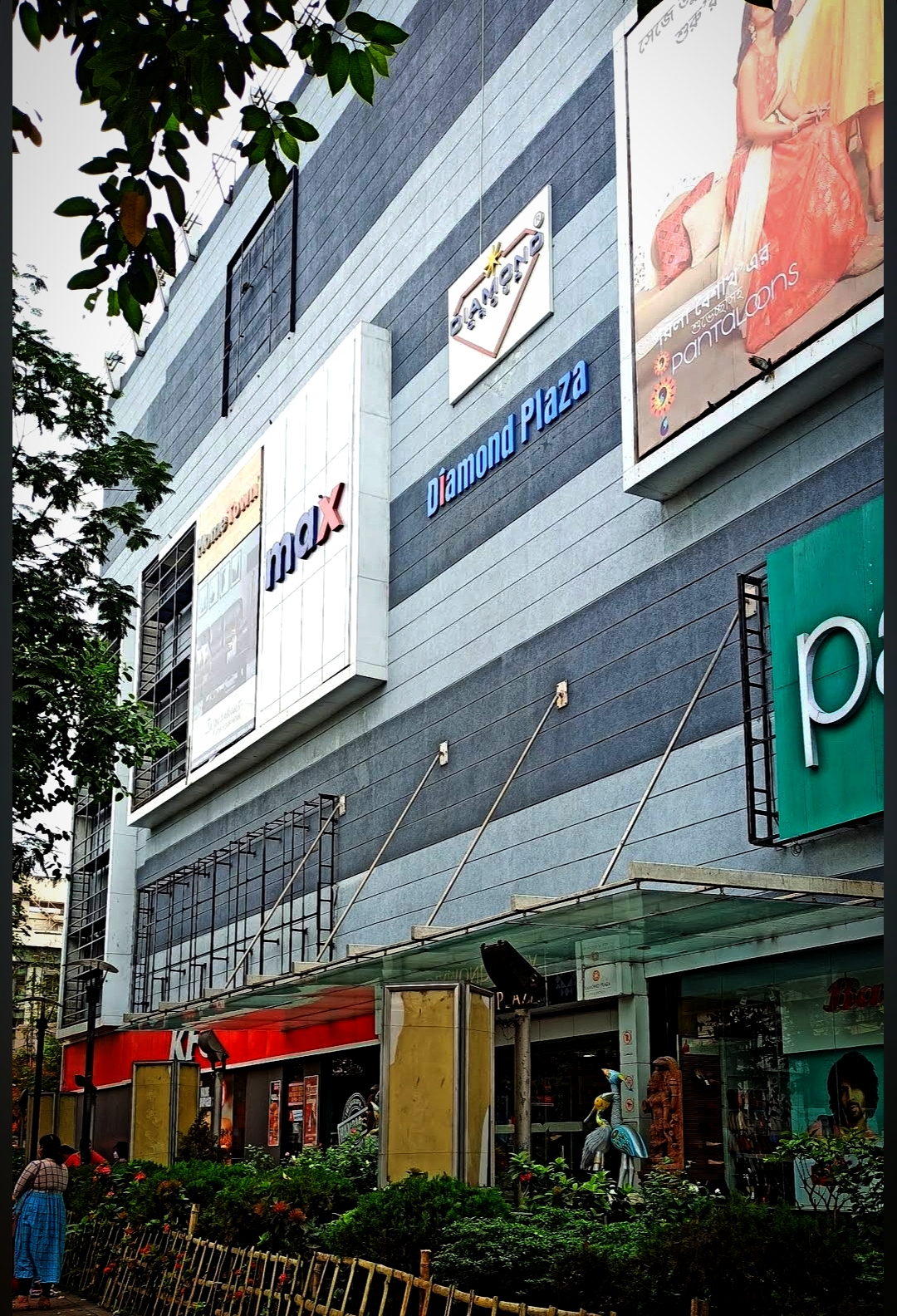
Diamond Plaza Mall, Jessore Rd

- Diamond Plaza Mall
- Nagerbazar Market
- Gorabazar Market
- Amrita Bazar Market
- Dum Dum Road Market
- Patipukur Fish Market
- Dum Dum Park Market
- Laketown-Kalindi Market
- Purba Sinthee Market
- Natun Bazar Market
  (Dum Dum Cantonment)
- Promodnagar Market

== Entertainment ==
Entertainment areas in South Dumdum:

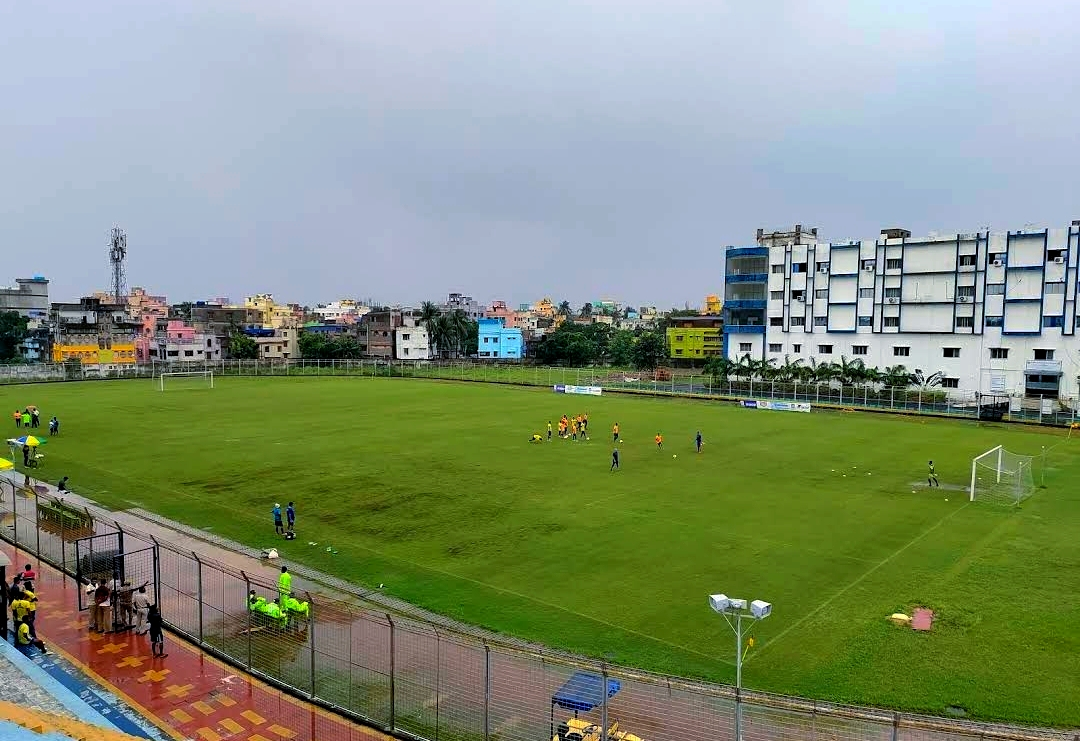
Amal Dutta Krirangan, Surer Math

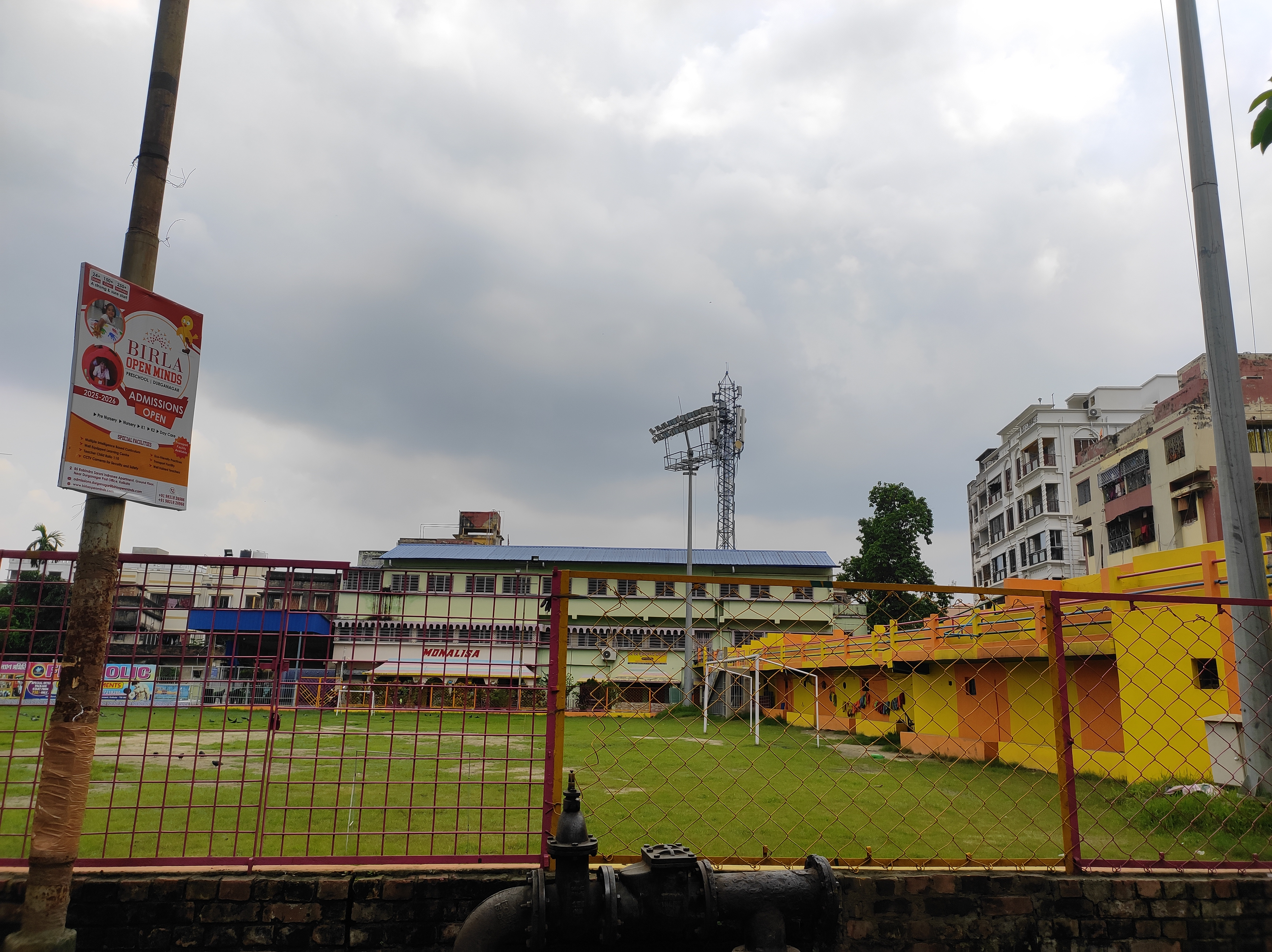
Subhas Maidan, Subhas Nagar

- Diamond Plaza Mall
- Indira Maidan
- Rabindra Bhavan
- Amal Dutta Krirangan
- Subhas Maidan

== Real Estates ==
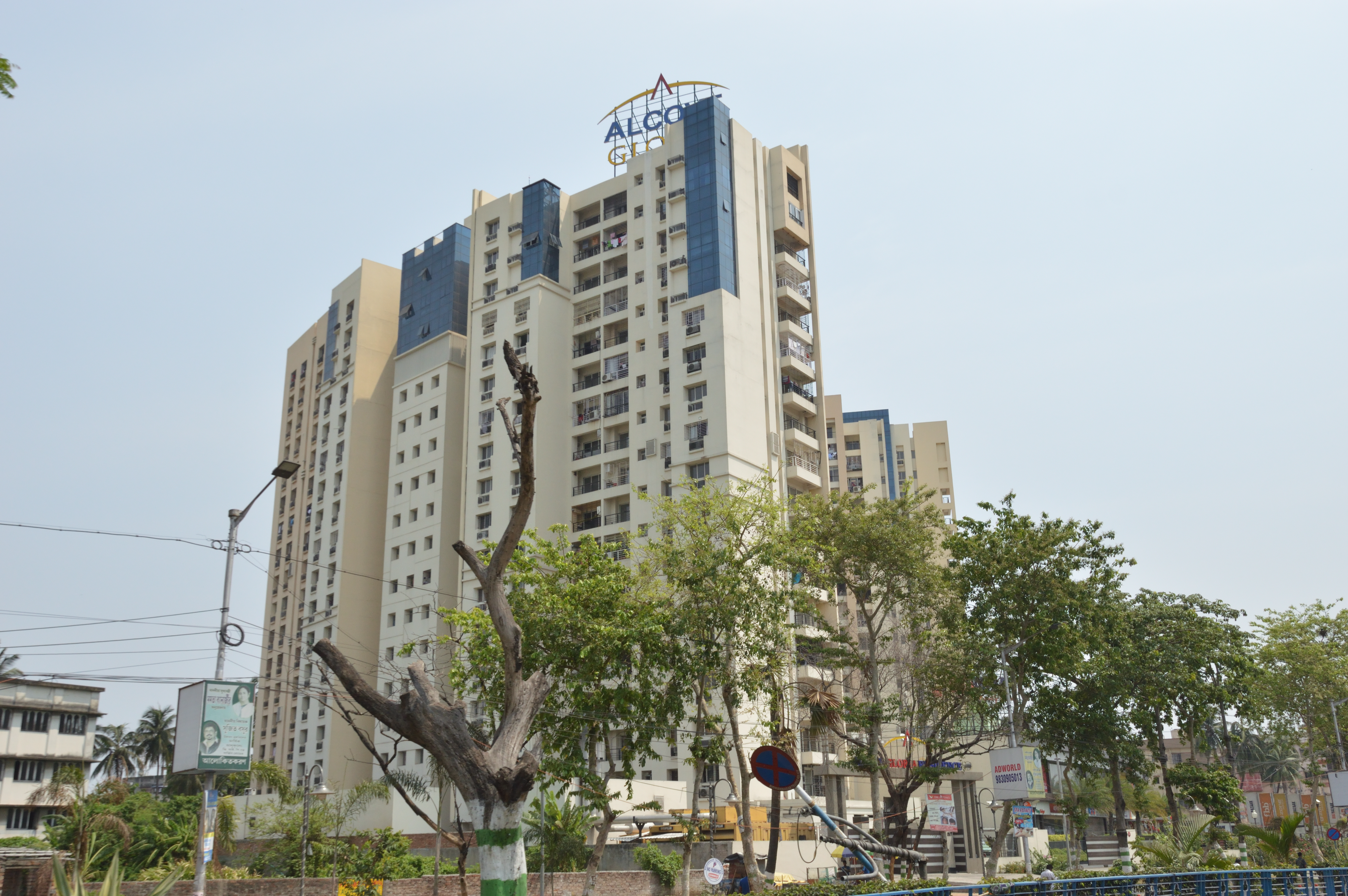
Alcove Gloria, VIP Road (Lake Town)

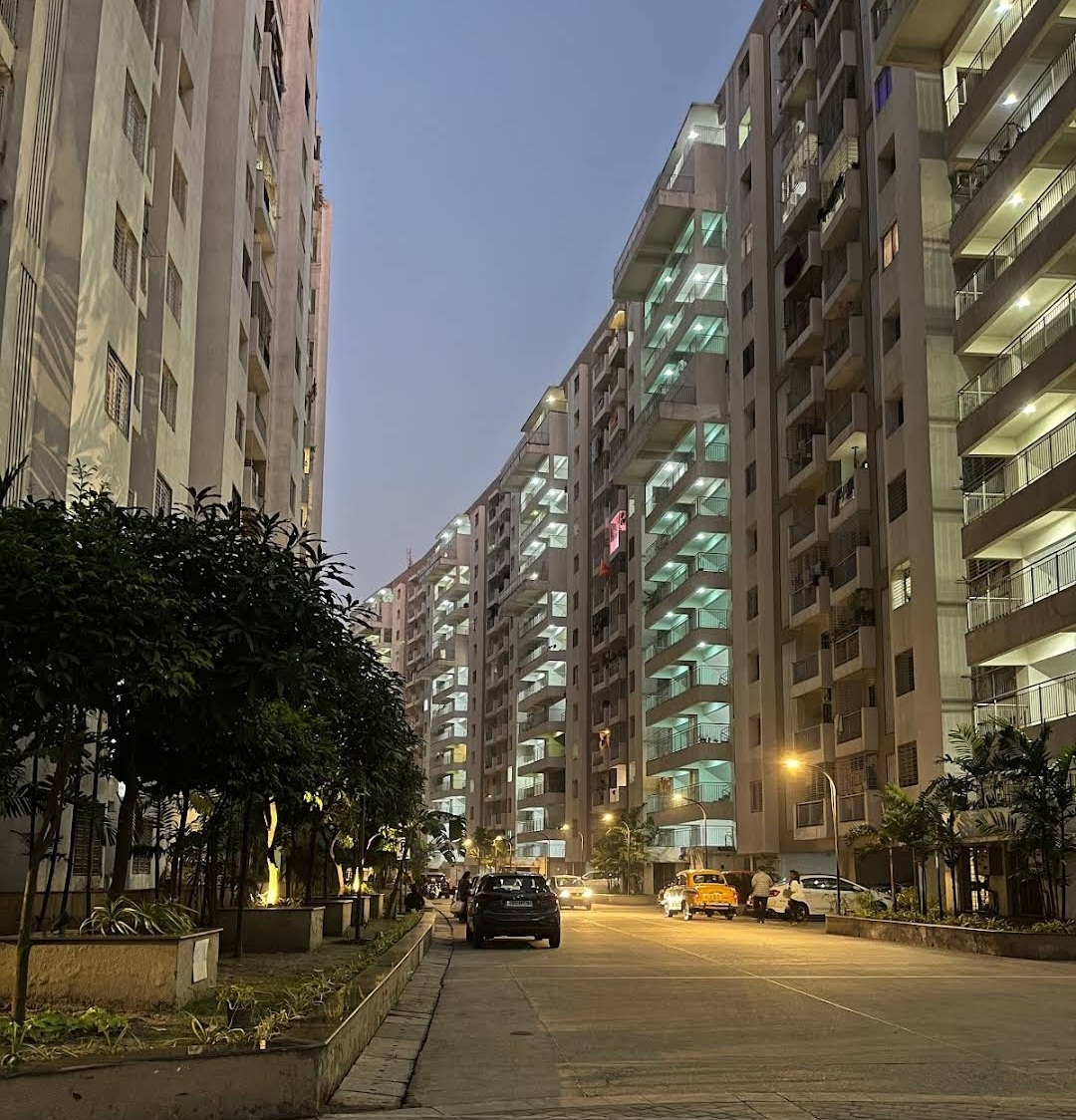
Emami City, Golpark (Nagerbazar)

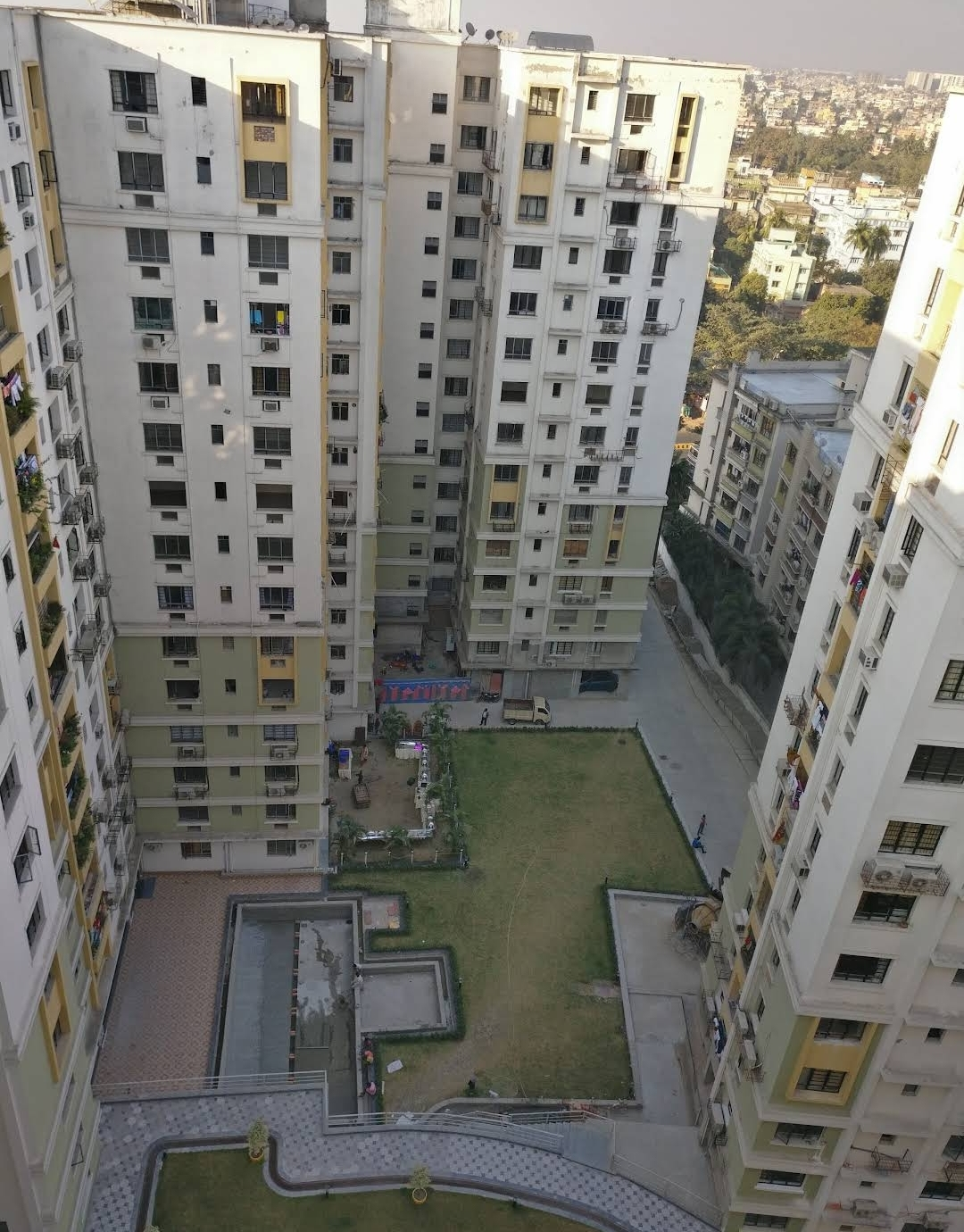
Avani Oxford, Jessore Road (Lake Town-Bangur Avenue)

A planned township with large open spaces, parks and a lake, South Dumdum is one of the most sought-after residential areas of Northern fringes of Kolkata. Its proximity to Kolkata Airport and commercial centres like Salt Lake and New Town has been a catalyst for the rising property prices in recent years.

== Transport ==
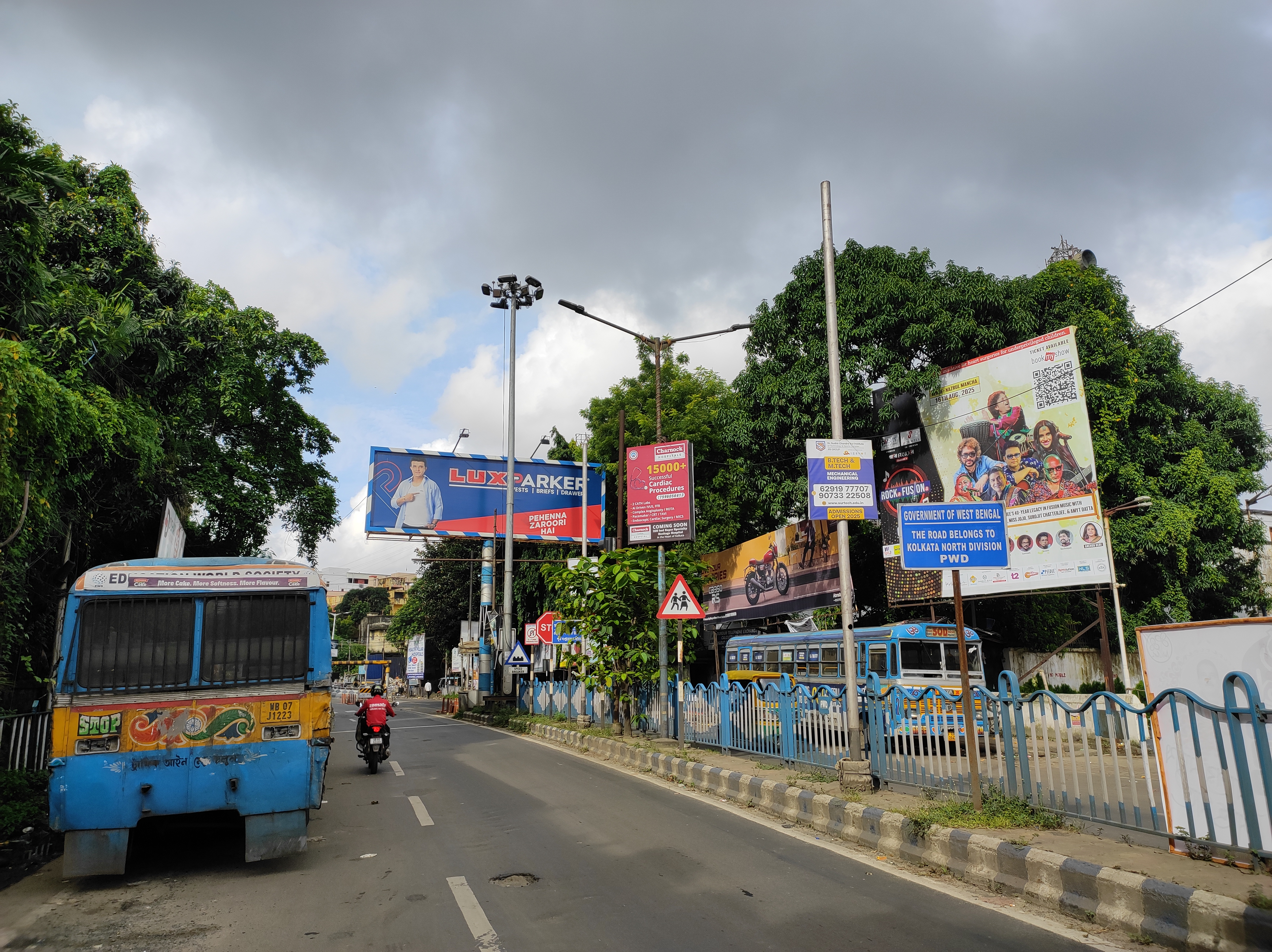
Jessore Road in South Dumdum

NH 12 (previously NH 34), running from Dalkhola to Bakkhali, locally popular as Jessore Road, passes through South Dumdum. In 2012, a flyover was opened from Amarpally to Nagerbazar Sarojini Naidu Women College to decongest the heavy traffic on Jessore Road towards the Dumdum/Kolkata Airport. Another important road named Dum Dum Road passes through South Dumdum connecting Dum Dum Junction railway station with Nagerbazar.

A large number of Buses ply along Jessore Rd and Dum Dum Rd are as follows:

- 3C/1 (Nagerbazar - Anandapur)
- 221 (Nagerbazar - Southern Avenue)
- 202 (Nagerbazar - Science City)
- 219 (Nagerbazar - Howrah Stn.)
- 219/1 (Nagerbazar - Howrah Stn.)
- Nagerbazar - Howrah Mini (S-168)
- 30D (Dum Dum Cant. - Babughat)
- 30B (Gouripur - Babughat)
- S10 (Airport Gate no 3 - Nabanna)
- AC 38 (Dum Dum Stn. - Karunamoyee)
- DN-8 (Barasat - Salt Lake Sector V)
- DN-9/1 (Barasat - Dakshineswar)
- 223 (B.T College - Golf Green)
- 227 (Bangur Avenue - B.N.R)
- 215/1 (Lake Town - Howrah Stn.)
- 47B (Lake Town - Kasba Dhanmath)
- KB-16 (Bangur Avenue - Shapoorji)
- 93 (Kharibari - Bagbazar)
- 79B (Barasat - Bagbazar)
- Nagerbazar - Dankuni Housing Bus
- Nagerbazar - Salap More Bus
- Rajchandrapur - Karunamoyee Bus
- AC 40 (Airport - Howrah Maidan)
- DN-18 (Baduria - Shyambazar)
- 91 (Bhangar - Shyambazar)
- 91A (Harao Banstala - Shyambazar)

Dum Dum Junction railway station, on the Sealdah-Ranaghat line, is about 7 km from the Sealdah railway station. It is a part of the Kolkata Suburban Railway system. Two lines branch out after Dum Dum Junction railway station – the Calcutta Chord line linking Dum Dum Junction railway station with Dankuni Junction railway station and the Sealdah-Bangaon line. Besides, Dum Dum Cantonment railway station is situated on the Sealdah-Bangaon line.

Kolkata Metro, the first underground metro in India, was initially constructed from Dum Dum to Tollygunge. It was progressively commissioned, the full length of 16.45 km being commissioned in 1995. Dum Dum metro station is located adjacent to Dum Dum Junction railway station.

Dum Dum Cantonment metro station is a under construction metro station of Yellow Line of Kolkata Metro. It is situated just beside the Dum Dum Cantonment railway station. The station was inaugurated on 22 August 2025.

=== Travel within South Dum Dum and Dum Dum ===
There are plenty of private buses, mini-buses and taxis, as well as a few WBTC buses in South Dum Dum. Autos can be found and used for short stretches.

Nagerbazar is the hub of autos where there are 4 routes originates viz:

1) Nagerbazar - Dum Dum Junction,

2) Nagerbazar - Dum Dum Cantonment,

3) Nagerbazar - Airport 1 no. gate,

4) Nagerbazar - Lake Town.

In addition, there are taxis: Nagerbazar has a large taxi stand. The other popular means of travel over short distances is the rickshaw, newly battery operated rickshaws (locally called Totos) can also be seen.

== See also ==
- Dum Dum
- North Dumdum
- Barrackpore subdivision
