= Mukundapur, Kolkata =

Mukundapur মুকুন্দপুর
- Neighbourhood in Kolkata (Calcutta)
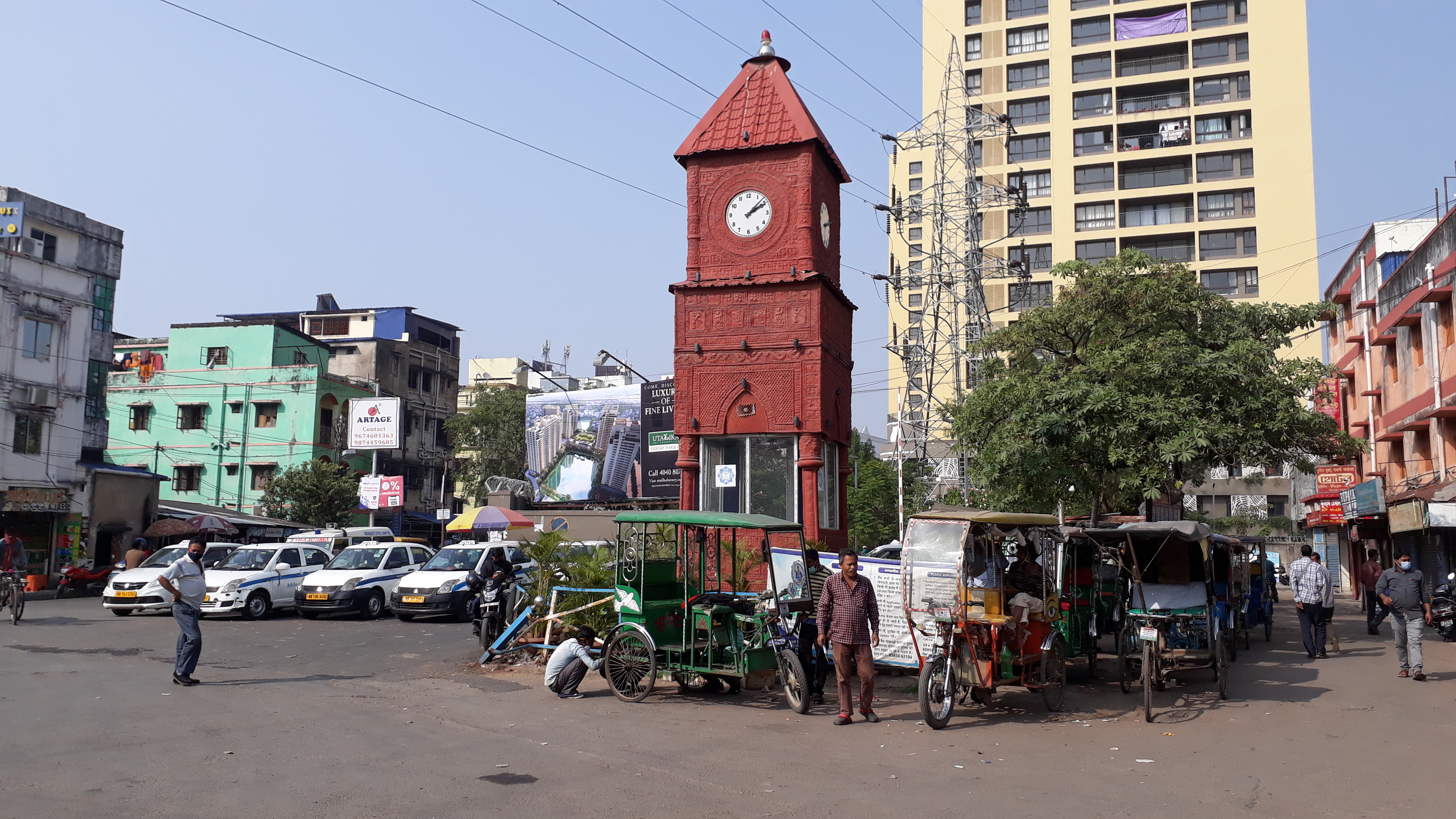
- Mukundapur tower

- Location in Kolkata
- Coordinates: 22.494121°N 88.408516°E
- Country: India
- State: West Bengal
- City: Kolkata
- District: Kolkata
- Metro Station: Jyotirindra Nath Nandi and Satyajit Ray
- Municipal Corporation: Kolkata Municipal Corporation
- KMC ward: 109

Population
  - Total: For population see linked KMC ward page
- Time zone: UTC+5:30 (IST)
- PIN: 700099, 700100, 700120
- Area code: +91 33
- Lok Sabha constituency: Jadavpur
- Vidhan Sabha constituency: Jadavpur

Mukundapur is a locality of East Kolkata in West Bengal, India. It is located at the south-eastern fringe of the city and marks the limit of KMC area.

== Geography ==
=== Police district ===
Purba Jadavpur police station is part of the East division of Kolkata Police. It is located at 305, Mukundapur Main Road, Kolkata-700 099.

Jadavpur, Thakurpukur, Behala, Purba Jadavpur, Tiljala, Regent Park, Metiabruz, Nadial and Kasba police stations were transferred from South 24 Parganas to Kolkata in 2011. Except Metiabruz, all the police stations were split into two. The new police stations are Parnasree, Haridevpur, Garfa, Patuli, Survey Park, Pragati Maidan, Bansdroni and Rajabagan.

== Healthcare ==
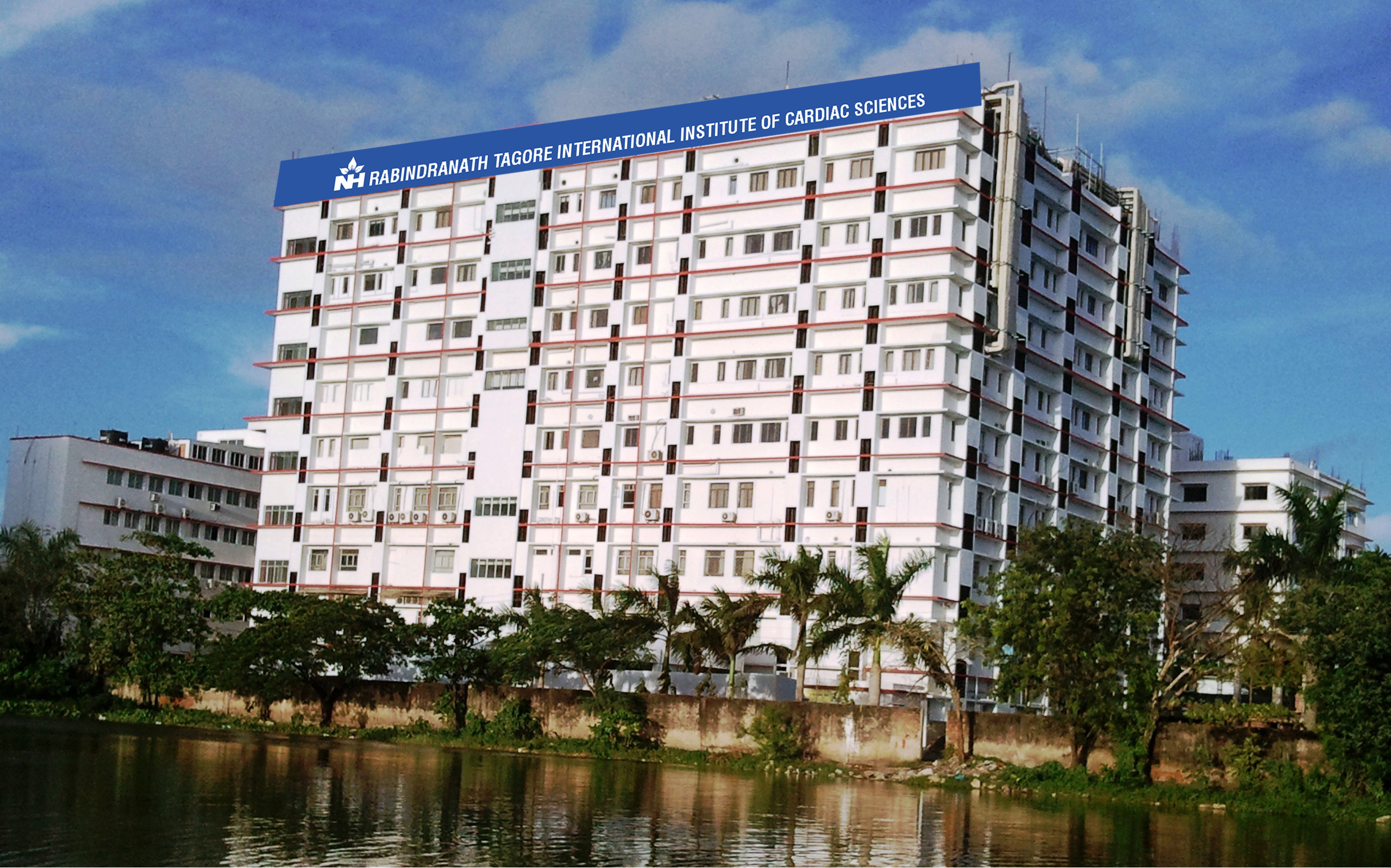
Rabindranath Tagore International Institute of Cardiac Sciences

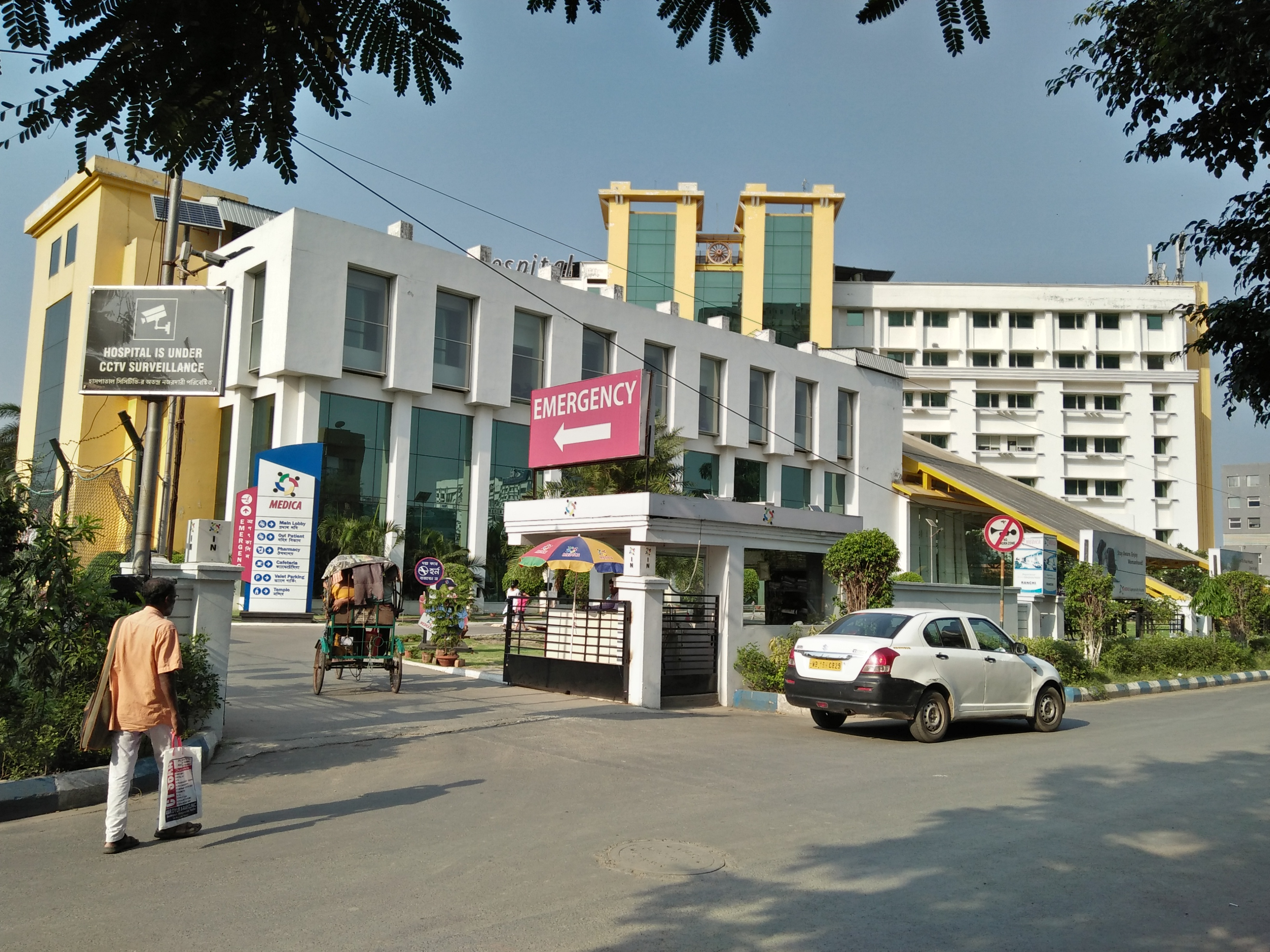
Medica Superspecialty Hospital

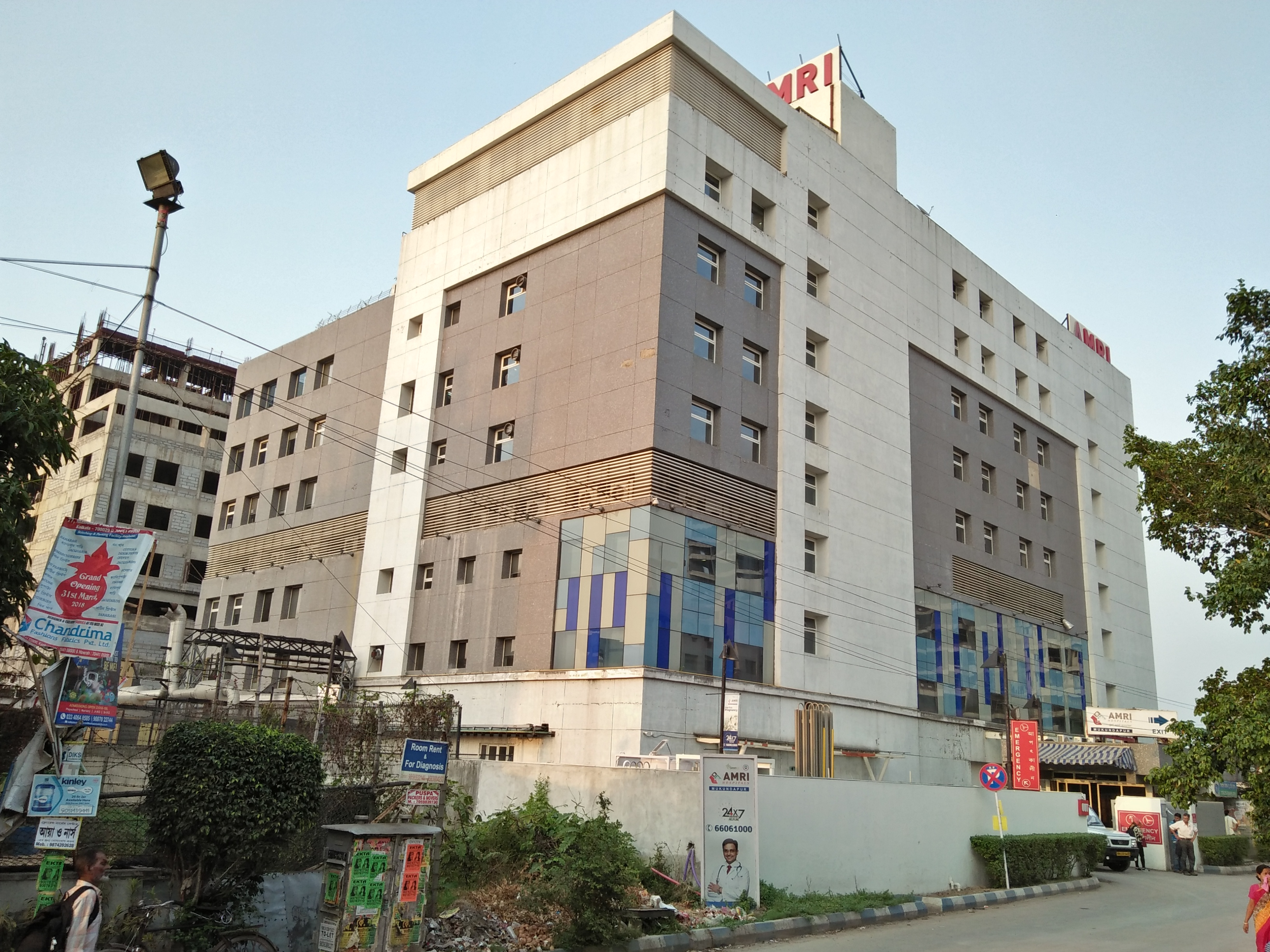
AMRI Hospital, Mukundapur

Mukundapur has developed as a hospital neighbourhood, with a number of varied medical facilities:

- Apollo Hospitals launched a platform Ask Apollo to book an instant appointment online with the doctors in Kolkata at Apollo Gleneagles Hospitals Kolkata. It is a 510-bed hospital including a 50-bedded surgical unit.
- AMRI Hospital, earlier known as Vision Care Hospital, was established in 1962, as a 150-bed multi-speciality hospital.
- Medica Superspecialty Hospital, Kolkata, established in 2010, is a 500-bed tertiary care hospital with the latest medical care facilities.
- Rabindranath Tagore International Institute of Cardiac Sciences, a unit of Narayana Health group, established in 2000, is a 500-bed multi-specialty hospital.
- Sankara Nethralaya, Kolkata, an eye hospital, was established in 1978.

== Real estate ==
Mukundapur witnessed a property development boom as of 2018. Compared with other neighbourhoods of Kolkata, prices were going up steadily.

== Transport ==
Jyotirindra Nath Nandi metro station, under construction on the Kavi Subhas-Biman Bandar route (Kolkata Metro Orange Line), would serve Mukundapur, Santoshpur, Ajoy Nagar and Survey Park areas lying close to the E.M. Bypass section of the city. It has been named in honour of the Bengali writer Jyotirindranath Nandi. Besides Satyajit Ray metro station (named in honour of the Bengali film-director Satyajit Ray) would also serve these areas.

=== Bus routes ===
- 1 Mukundapur - Ramnagar
- 1A Mukundapur - Ramnagar
- 24A/1 Mukundapur - Howrah station
- SD-16 Mukundapur - Shirakole
