= Survey Park =

- Neighbourhood in Kolkata (Calcutta)
- Location in Kolkata
- Coordinates: 22.493121°N 88.393516°E
- Country: India
- State: West Bengal
- City: Kolkata
- District: Kolkata
- Metro Station: Jyotirindra Nath Nandi and Satyajit Ray
- Municipal Corporation: Kolkata Municipal Corporation
- KMC ward: 109

Population
  - Total: For population see linked KMC ward page
- Time zone: UTC+5:30 (IST)
- PIN: 700 075
- Area code: +91 33
- Lok Sabha constituency: Jadavpur
- Vidhan Sabha constituency: Jadavpur

Survey Park is a locality in Santoshpur area of East Kolkata in West Bengal, India.

== Geography ==
=== Police district ===
Survey Park police station is part of the East division of Kolkata Police. It is located at Ground Floor, D50/2, Near Sammilani Mahavidyalaya, East Rajapur, Santoshpur, Kolkata, West Bengal 700075.

Jadavpur, Thakurpukur, Behala, Purba Jadavpur, Tiljala, Regent Park, Metiabruz, Nadial and Kasba police stations were transferred from South 24 Parganas to Kolkata in 2011. Except Metiabruz, all the police stations were split into two. The new police stations are Parnasree, Haridevpur, Garfa, Patuli, Survey Park, Pragati Maidan, Bansdroni and Rajabagan.

== Transport ==
Jyotirindra Nath Nandi metro station and Satyajit Ray metro station, under construction on the Kavi Subhas-Biman Bandar route (Kolkata Metro Orange Line), would serve Survey Park, Santoshpur and Ajoy Nagar areas lying close to the E.M. Bypass section of the city.

== Sports ==
Kishore Bharati Krirangan, also called Jadavpur Stadium, is a multi-purpose sports facility, used mainly for football matches. It has a seating capacity of 12,000. It is currently under renovation.
