= Kishore Bharati Krirangan =

Football stadium in Kolkata, India

Kishore Bharati Stadium
- Mukundapur Stadium
- A match between April 25 vs Hồ Chí Minh City at Kishore Bharati Krirangan in November 2026
- Interactive map of Kishore Bharati Stadium
- Location: Santoshpur, Kolkata, Kolkata
- Coordinates: 22°29′39″N 88°23′40″E
- Owner: West Bengal Department of Public Works
- Operator: Indian Football Association
- Capacity: 12,000
- Surface: Grass
- Public transit: Jyotirindra Nath Nandi

Construction
- Opened: 7 January 2021
- Renovated: 2024

Kishore Bharati Krirangan (commonly known as Mukundapur Stadium) is a multi-purpose stadium in Kolkata, West Bengal, used mainly for football matches. The capacity of the stadium is 12,000, and the size of the sports complex is 13 acres. It occasionally hosts Calcutta Premier Division matches. Sports meets of different schools are also held here.

== History ==
Kishore Bharati Stadium was opened on 7 February 2021 after a brief renovation by the Government of West Bengal. Chief minister Mamata Banerjee inaugurated it ahead of the 2020–21 I-League. The stadium hosted its first domestic league match between Gokulam Kerala and Real Kashmir on the same day.

A few years ago the stadium was used as the home ground of Tollygunge Agragami for Calcutta Football League matches.

== Location ==
The stadium is located beside E.M. Bypass in the Survey Park area (Purba Diganta) of Santoshpur, Kolkata.

== Facilities ==
The stadium is equipped with several facilities, a La Liga football academy, and can be used for football and athletic events.

A modern underground drainage system is present in the stadium. It has practice grounds for cricket and football. There is a 100-seater dormitory accommodation facility present below the galleries. It has facilities to host seminars, conferences and meetings. A swimming pool complex is present beside the stadium. A martial arts training centre also operates on the premises.

== See also ==
- Salt Lake Stadium
- Barasat Stadium
- Kalyani Stadium
- Rabindra Sarobar Stadium
- Eden Gardens
- AFC Women's Champions League (2026–27)
