= Ajoy Nagar =

- Neighbourhood
- Location in Kolkata
- Coordinates: 22°29′24.18″N 88°23′39.68″E
- Country: India
- State: West Bengal
- City: Kolkata
- District: Kolkata
- Metro Station: Jyotirindra Nath Nandi and Satyajit Ray
- Municipal Corporation: Kolkata Municipal Corporation
- KMC wards: 109
- Time zone: UTC+5:30 (IST)
- PIN: 700 075
- Area code: +91 33
- Lok Sabha constituency: Jadavpur
- Vidhan Sabha constituency: Jadavpur

Ajoy Nagar is a locality of South Kolkata in West Bengal, India. It is surrounded by Santoshpur, Mukundapur and Garia.

== Transport ==
Jyotirindra Nath Nandi metro station and Satyajit Ray metro station, under construction on the Kavi Subhash–Biman Bandar route (Kolkata Metro Orange Line), would serve Ajoy Nagar, Survey Park and Santoshpur areas lying close to the E.M. Bypass section of the city.
