= Jyotirindranath Nandi =

Indian writer (1912–1982)

- Born: 20 August 1912; Comilla, Bengal Presidency, British India
- Died: 1 August 1982 (aged 69); Kolkata, West Bengal, India
- Occupation: Writer
- Spouse: Parul Nandi
- Children: 2 sons (Dipankar, Tirthankar), 1 daughter (Smita)
- Writing career
- Language: Bengali
- Notable works: Shalik ki Charai; Suryamukhi; Baro Ghar Ek Uthan

Jyotirindranath Nandi (used to sign as Jyotirindra Nandi; 1912–1982) was an Indian writer who created a niche for himself in Bengali literature.

Jyotirindranath was better known for his short stories. Shalik ki Charai is a notable collection of his short stories. His first novel was Suryamukhi. His most famous novel was Baro Ghar Ek Uthan. Amongst his other books were Mirar Dupur, Premer Cheye Baro and Ei Tar Puraskar.

== Early life ==
Jyotirindranath Nandi was born at Comilla, now in Bangladesh, in 1912. His father, Apurba Chandra Nandi, was a lawyer at Brahmanbaria nearby. However, Jyotirindranath had decided early in life to be a writer. He started with poetry when at school and switched over to prose. He made his way to hand-written wall magazines and then his name first appeared in print when he was in college. While still a student he joined the Swadeshi movement and was jailed for four months. In 1936, he moved to Kolkata and settled down to a life concentrating on writing. In his writing he focused on lower-middle class life. He lived in the slums, in order to get acquainted with life there. His sharp insight into life of downtrodden people has enriched Bengali literature. He moved over from one rented house to another seven times, and changed over jobs many times.

== At Kolkata ==
At Kolkata, Jyotirindranath led a disciplined and dedicated life devoted wholly to writing. Many of his short stories were published in a magazine edited by Premendra Mitra, and in other magazines as well, such as Purbasha and Agragati. It was during this period that one of his stories was published in Desh, the leading Bengali literary magazine. Publication of his short stories continued in many other magazines – Matribhoomi, Bharatvarsha, Chaturanga, Parichay. In the midst of his deep involvement with short stories he received an encouraging push from Sagarmoy Ghosh, editor of Desh, "... now get on to novels." He wrote Suryamukhi and it was serialized in Desh. It was followed by Mirar Dupur and Baro Ghar Ek Uthan. The latter earned him fame and respectability, and established him as a writer, but also brought in criticism, "...he only shows darkness." It may be recalled that Jyotirindranath had located a house in a slum where eleven families, most of them from East Bengal, shared a single large courtyard. One house was vacant. He went and lived there as a tenant. His daughter was only four years old then. He carefully studied his neighbours, including a nurse and a small shop worker, and wrote about them in the light of a hurricane lantern. Thus came to light his novel Baro Ghar Ek Uthan (twelve families and one courtyard). Answering his critics, he said, "I have not written the book with the objective of projecting the sunny side or enlightenment in life. Amongst those who lived in that house, there was none who could inspire a ray of hope in life. I have only shown to what depths of darkness those threatened and devastated people of a degraded society could go down to, only to survive somehow."

== Works ==
=== Novels ===
Suryamukhi (1952), Mirar Dupur (1953), Baro Ghar Ek Uthan, Grishya Basar, Nischintapurer Manush, Hridayer Rang, Premer Cheye Baro, Sarpil, Tin Pari Chhoye Premik, Nil Ratri, Bananir Prem

=== Short stories ===
Khelna (1946), Shalik ki Charui (1954), Chandramallika, Char Yar (1954), Girgiti, Bananir Prem, Mahiyasi, Khalpol o Tiner Gharer Chitrakar, Bandhu Patni (1955), Nadi o Nari, Pasher Flater Meyeta, Diner Galpa Ratrir Gan, Jayjayanti, Samudra, Tarinir Bari Badal, Chhidra, Khuda, Buno-ol, Aaj Kothay Jaben, Aam Kanthaler Chhuti, Bhat, Taxiwala, Gaachh, Chor, Parbatipurer Bikel, Chhutki Butki, Boner Raja

Note:The lists are incomplete

== Metro station ==
Jyotirindra Nandi metro station, named in honour of the writer, is under construction on the Kavi Subhash–Biman Bandar Kolkata Metro Orange Line.
