= Jyotirindra Nandi metro station =

Metro station in Kolkata, India

Jyotirindra Nandi
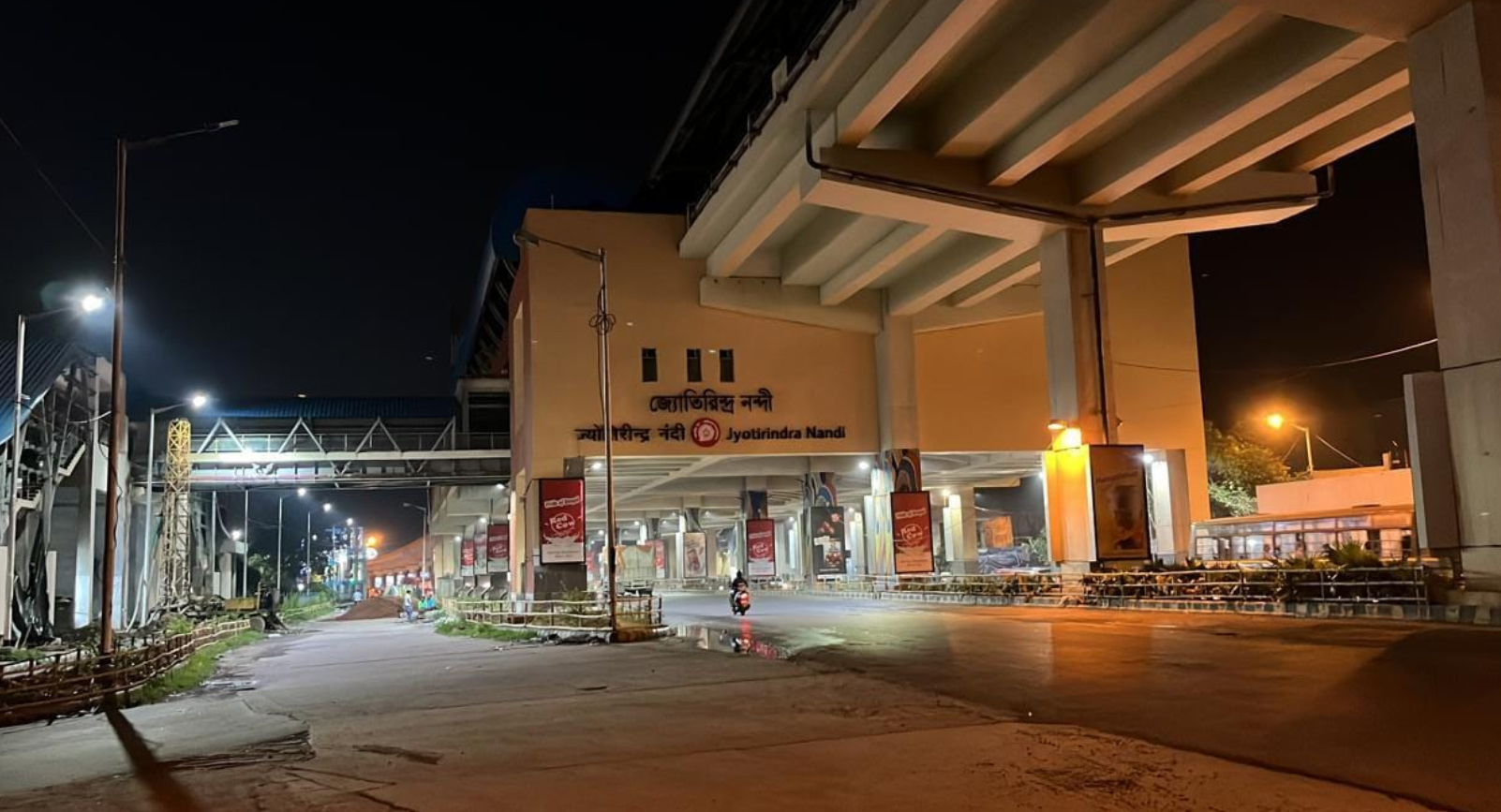
- Jyotirindra Nandi Metro Station

General information
- Location: E.M. Bypass, Purbalok, Mukundapur; Kolkata, West Bengal 700099; India
- Coordinates: 22.49591°N 88.39866°E
- System: Kolkata Metro
- Operator: Metro Railway, Kolkata
- Line: Orange Line
- Platforms: 2 (2 side platforms)
- Tracks: 2

Construction
- Structure type: Elevated
- Accessible: Yes

Other information
- Station code: KJNN

History
- Opened: 6 March 2024; 2 years ago

Services
Preceding station	Kolkata Metro	Following station
Satyajit Ray towards Kavi Subhash	Orange Line	Kavi Sukanta towards Beleghata
Route map
Location

Jyotirindra Nandi is a metro station of Orange Line of Kolkata Metro. The station serves Mukundapur, Santoshpur and Ajoy Nagar areas outlying the E.M. Bypass section of the city.

The station is named in honour of the Bengali writer, Jyotirindranath Nandi.

== History ==
This project was sanctioned in the budget of 2010–11 by Mamata Banerjee with a project deadline of six years. The execution of this project has been entrusted to RVNL at a cost of Rs 3951.98 crore. It will help to reduce travel time between the southern fringes of Kolkata to Netaji Subhas Chandra Bose International Airport.

The 5 km (3.1 mi) stretch from New Garia to Ruby Hospital was expected to start from 2018. Till then, the station and associated metro viaduct connections are fully completed with trail runs being conducted over this and other phase 1 stations. RVNL planned to launch the metro over this truncated route before this year's Durga Puja, but was postponed due to signalling issues.

After lot of hardships and developmental work, the Kavi Subhash–Hemanta Mukhopadhyay of Orange Line was inaugurated on 6 March 2024.

== The Station ==
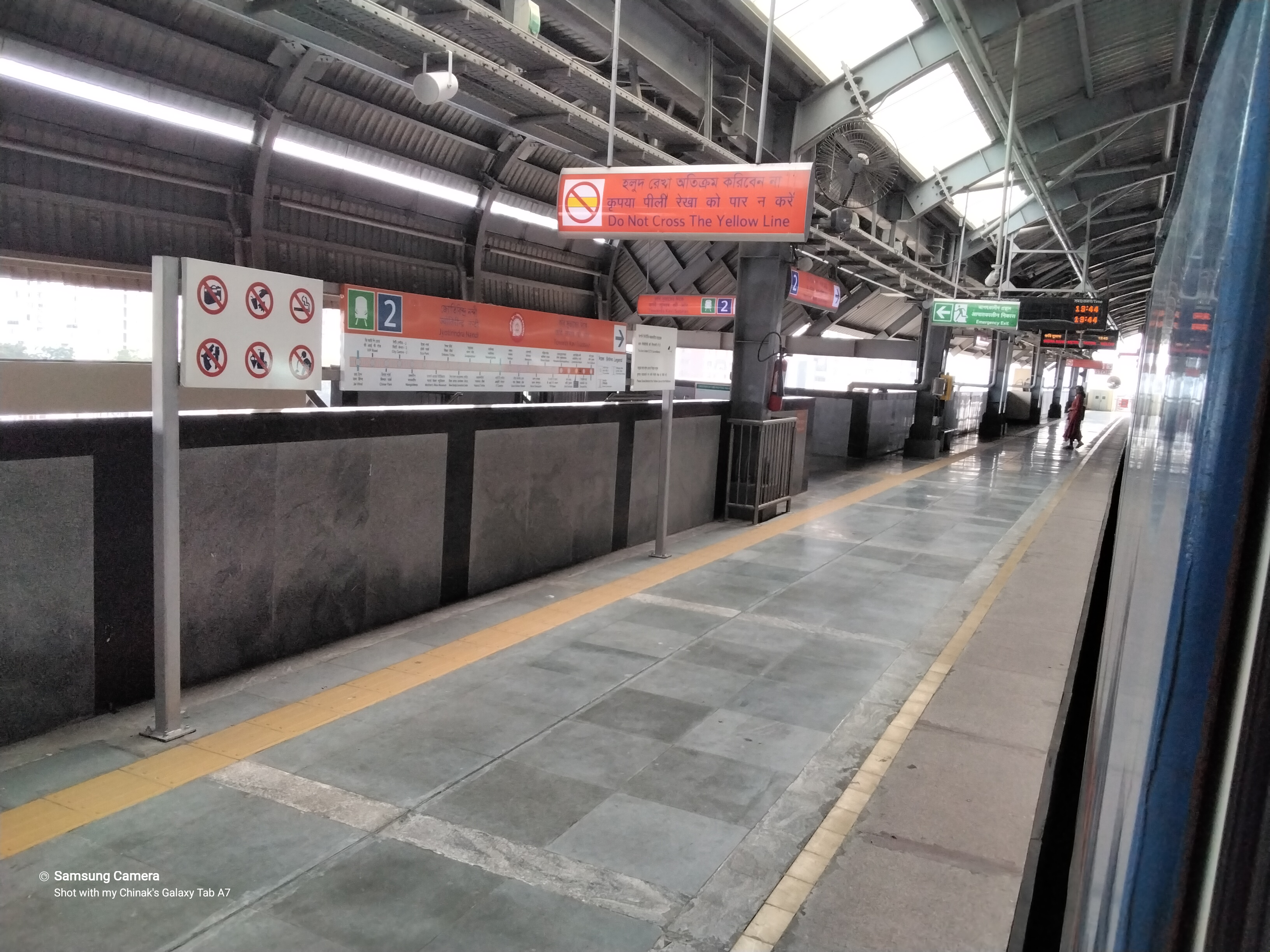
Jyotirindra Nandi platform

=== Structure ===
Jyotirindra Nandi Metro Station on Orange Line of Kolkata Metro is structurally an elevated metro station. The station has total 3 levels. Station entrances and exits begin or end at the first level or ground level. Second level or L1 or intermediate level houses station fare control, station agents, metro card vending machines, crossovers etc. The third level or L2 or the final level houses the platforms and rail tracks. The station is 200 meters long and 25 meters wide.

=== Layout ===
L2	Side platform, Doors will open on the left
L2	Platform 1	Train towards Beleghata (Kavi Sukanta) →
L2	Platform 2	← Train towards Kavi Subhash (Satyajit Ray)
L2	Side platform, Doors will open on the left
L1	Concourse	Fare control, station agent, Metro QR ticket vending machines, crossover
G	Street level	Exit/Entrance

=== Location ===
Jyotirindra Nandi metro station is in vicinity of Metro Cash and Carry office and various private hospitals like Peerless Hospital. The famous Kishore Bharati Krirangan, one of the city's biggest football stadium, that attracts fans all over the Kolkata as it is the alternative grounds of famous Kolkata clubs, i.e., Mohun Bagan AC, East Bengal FC and Mohammedan Sporting lies close the station. The previous station of the station is Satyajit Roy Metro Station at a distance of 1.4 km and the next station is Kavi Sukanta Metro Station at a distance of 1.1 km.

=== Infrastructure ===
The station is being built with state-of-the-art technology. The station has 4 entrances and exits for entry and exit. A number of lifts, staircases and elevators are attached to the reach the concourse building. The second level of the station has ticket collection center, ticket validator for ticket examination. The station will have escalators for the convenience of passengers. Besides, the station will have drinking water and toilet facilities.

== Electricity and signal systems ==
Like the other stations and lines of the Kolkata Metro, this station will use 750 volts DC power supply by the third railway to operate the trains.

Train movement will be conducted at this station and on the railway by communication-based train control signal system. This signal system can operate a 90-second interval train. Currently this automatic signalling system is not activated and only one metro track is operational.

== See also ==
- List of Kolkata Metro stations
