= Santoshpur, Kolkata =

Neighbourhood in West Bengal, India

Santoshpur
- Neighbourhood in Kolkata (Calcutta)
- Location in Kolkata
- Coordinates: 22.491°N 88.383°E
- Country: India
- State: West Bengal
- City: Kolkata
- District: Kolkata
- Kolkata Suburban Railway: Jadavpur and Baghajatin
- Metro Station: Jyotirindra Nath Nandi and Satyajit Ray
- Municipal Corporation: Kolkata Municipal Corporation
- KMC wards: 103, 104, 109
- Elevation: 36 ft (11 m)
- Time zone: UTC+5:30 (IST)
- PIN: 700075
- Area code: +91 33
- Lok Sabha constituency: Jadavpur
- Vidhan Sabha constituency: Jadavpur

Santoshpur is a locality of South Kolkata in West Bengal, India. It is a part of Jadavpur and is loosely bounded by Garfa to the north, the Eastern Metropolitan Bypass to the east and Baghajatin to the west and south.

== History of Santoshpur area ==
=== From the 1950s ===
This area was initially part of Jadavpur. The area was mainly shallow marshy lands and agricultural fields even as late as the seventies. Some houses were built in the fifties and sixties mostly on the eastern side of the Jadavpur railway station. Residents are mostly East Bengali refugees.

== Transport ==
Jyotirindra Nath Nandi metro station and Satyajit Ray metro station, under construction on the Kavi Subhas-Biman Bandar route (Kolkata Metro Orange Line), would serve Santoshpur, Ajoy Nagar, Survey Park areas lying close to the E.M. Bypass section of the city.

PRIVATE BUS ROUTES:

- 1A MUKUNDAPUR - RAMNAGAR
- 1B GARIA STATION -RAMNAGAR
- SD16 MUKUNDAPUR - SIRAKOLE
- 106 SANTOSHPUR BBD BAG MINI

WBTC BUS ROUTES:

- AC9 JADAVPUR - KARUNAMOYEE
- AC9B JADAVPUR - ECOSPACE- SECTOR V
- S9 JADAVPUR - KARUNAMOYEE
- D27 JADAVPUR - NAIHATI
- D27A JADAVPUR - HABRA - ASHOKNAGAR
- AC43 GOLFGREEN -AIRPORT
- S5C NAYABAD - HOWRAH
- S5C/N NAYABAD - NABANNA
