= Eastern Metropolitan Bypass =

Road in Kolkata, India

- abbreviated as EM Bypass
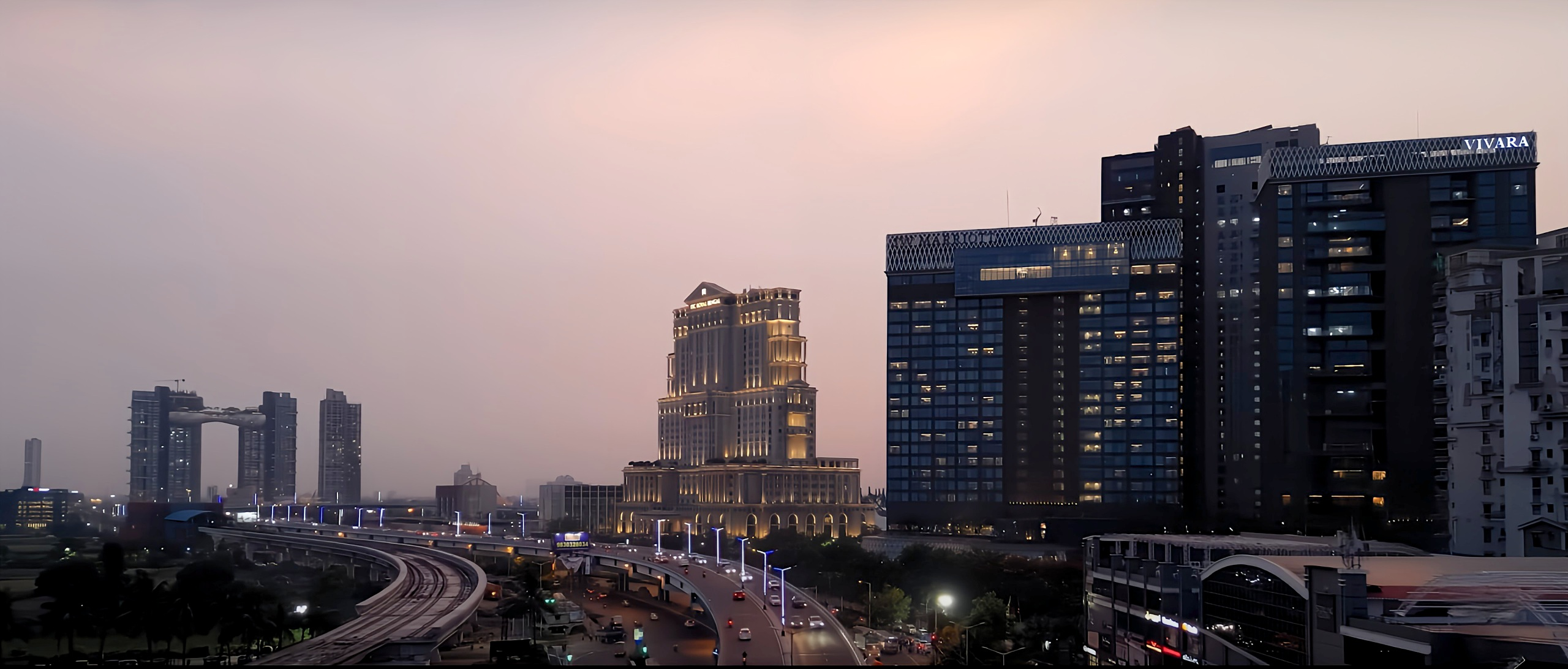
- Skyline along EM Bypass
- Part of: SH 3
- Maintained by: Kolkata Metropolitan Development Authority
- Length: 32 km (20 mi)
- Location: Greater Kolkata (Kolkata district and South 24 Parganas district), India
- Nearest Kolkata Metro station: Green Line: Bengal Chemical Salt Lake Stadium; Blue Line: Shahid Khudiram; Orange Line: Satyajit Ray Jyotirindra Nandi Kavi Sukanta Hemanta Mukhopadhyay VIP Bazar Ritwik Ghatak Barun Sengupta Beleghata
- North end: Ultadanga
- South end: Kamalgazi, with an extension to Baruipur (Baruipur Bypass)

Construction
- Completed: 1982

Eastern Metropolitan Bypass (also known as EM Bypass) is a 32 kilometres (20 mi) long six to eight-lane major bypass road on the east side of Kolkata in the Indian state of West Bengal. It connects Ultadanga (North Kolkata) to Baruipur Puratan Bazar (under Kolkata metropolitan area). The road is a major link to Salt Lake and New Town. EM Bypass is part of State Highway 3. EM Bypass is centered with major hotels, business parks, high residential blocks and other high-end construction and development. The Bypass road connects North 24 Parganas district and Kolkata district

== History and development ==
The Eastern Metropolitan Bypass was constructed during the 1980s and became operational in 1982. The construction disrupted part of the East Kolkata Wetlands.

It was designed as a six to eight-lane bypass to lessen traffic congestion on the entire stretch of Gariahat Road. Several consequent connections have been made to Gariahat Road to further move traffic to the Bypass.

At one point in 2010 the road was officially named Jyoti Basu Sarani after Jyoti Basu. The road was further renamed Biswa Bangla Sarani by the Chief Minister Mamata Banerjee in 2011.

The road is undergoing expansion under the JNNURM.

== Connectors and overpasses ==
A number of 'connectors' or connecting roads link the bypass to major hubs of the city all along its route. From north to south, these are:

Junction type	Area	Connected locations	Notes
Junction	Bagmari Road	Ultadanga - goes towards Hatibagan & Shobhabazar as Aurobindo Sarani	
Flyover	Ultadanga Flyover	Dumdum/Kolkata Airport from south through VIP Road	
Junction	Maniktala Road	Maniktala, Kankurgachi - goes towards Howrah via Girish Park & Posta as Vivekananda Road	
Junction	Narkeldanga Road	Rajabazar, Phoolbagan & Kadapara	
Junction	Beleghata Road	Sealdah Station, Beleghata, Chingrighata - goes towards Howrah via Burrabazar as MG Road	
Flyover	Chingrighata Flyover	Chingrighata to Salt Lake and New Town	
Junction	JBS Haldane Avenue	Park Circus, Science City & Bantala - goes towards Howrah via Rabindra Sadan as AJC Bose Road	
Flyover	Maa Flyover	Park Circus to Science City & Beleghata Metropolitan - connected with AJC Bose Road Flyover towards Howrah	
Junction	Bondel Road	Ballygunj, Tiljala & VIP Nagar - goes towards Hazra, Alipore & Mominpur as Hazra Road	
Junction	Rash Behari Avenue	Kalighat, Deshapriya Park, Gariahat, Kasba, Anandapur & Nonadanga - goes towards Chetla & Majherhat	
Junction	Prince Anwar Shah Road	Dhakuria, Jodhpur Park, Selimpur, Lake Gardens, Garfa & Kalikapur - goes towards New Alipore & Taratala as Tollygunje Circular Road	
Junction	Ajaynagar-Santoshpur Avenue & Eastern Park Road	Santoshpur and Jadavpur Via Santoshpur Jora Bridge crossing, Ajoy Nagar, Purbalok & Mukundapur	
Junction	Garia	Baishnabghata Patuli Township, Garia	
Junction	Garia Station Road	Garia railway station, Briji, Shitala Mandir Bus Stand of Garia	
Junction	Pepsi	Mahamayatala & Kandarpopur town	
Flyover	Kamalgazi Flyover	Kamalgazi to Narendrapur towards Rajpur Sonarpur	
Junction	Sonarpur Station Road	Kamalgazi & Sonarpur railway station	
Junction	Dr. B. C. Roy road	Kalitala with Netaji Subhash Chandra Bose Road - goes towards Rajpur Municipal Market	
Junction	Baruipur-Amtala Road	Baruipur with Julpia - goes towards Amtala	
Junction	Baruipur-Canning Road	Baruipur with Fultala & Uttarbhag - goes towards Champahati & Canning Town respectively	

== Gallery ==
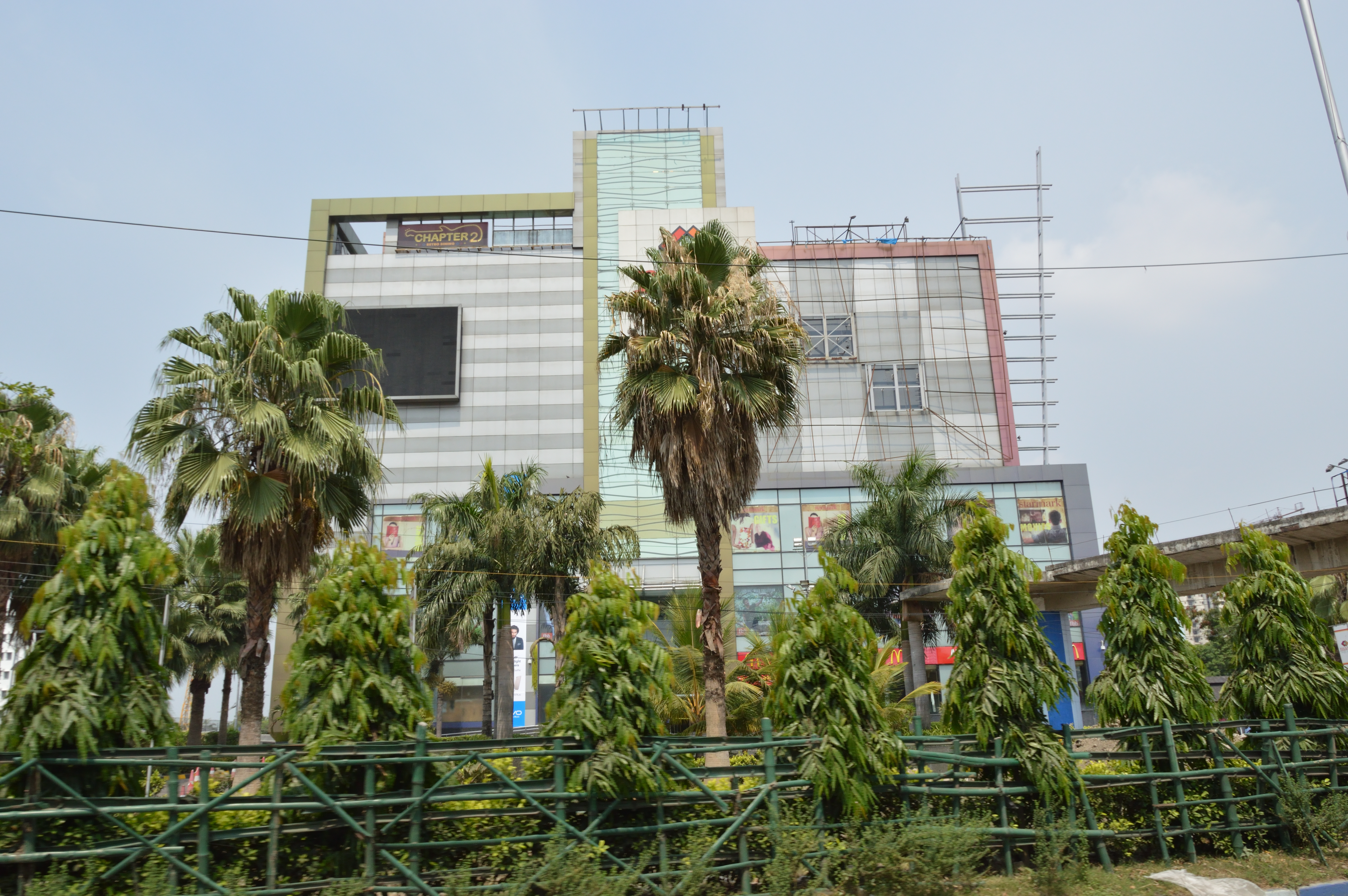
Mani Square, Kankurgachi

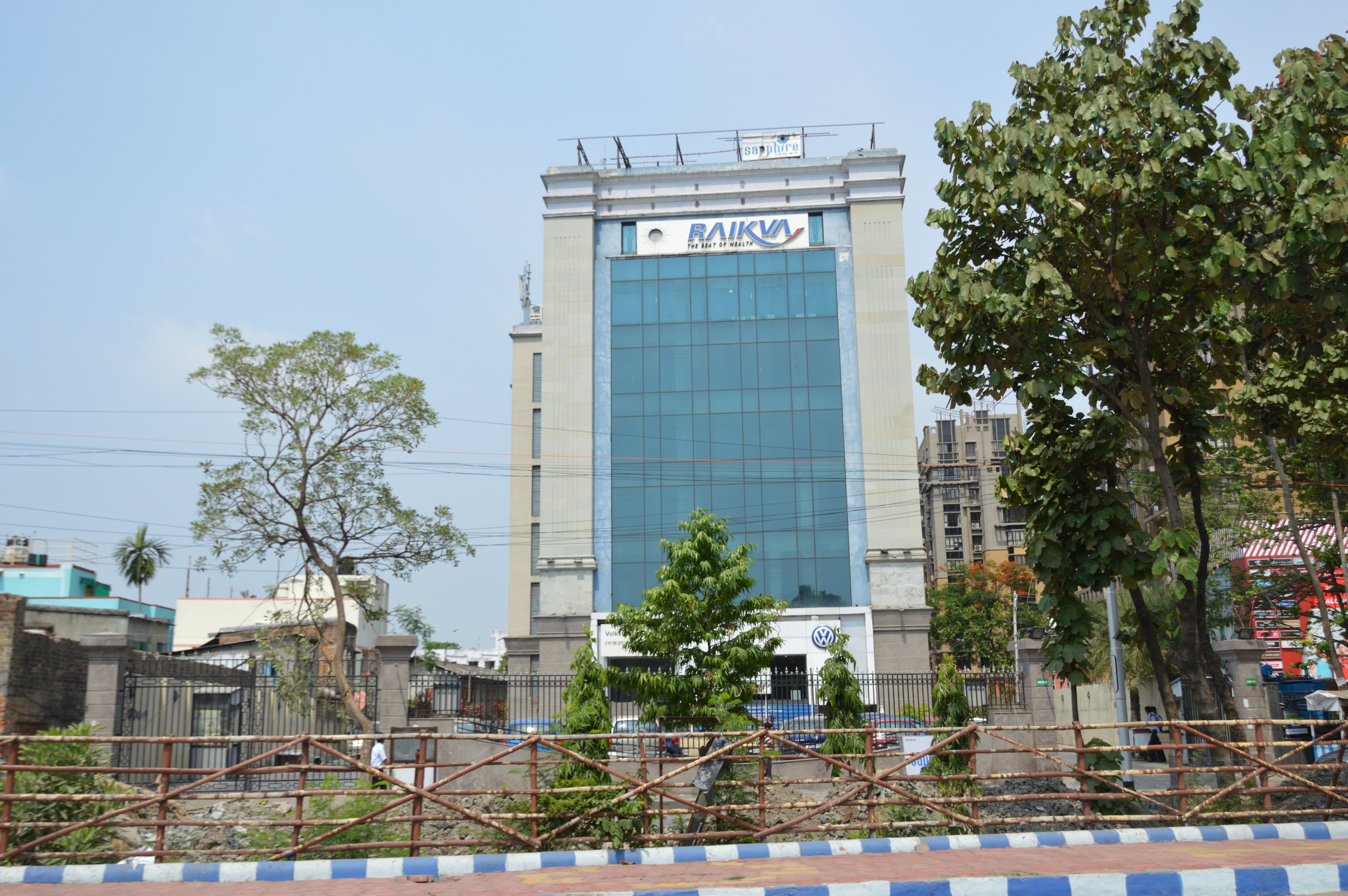
Raikva Building, Beliaghata

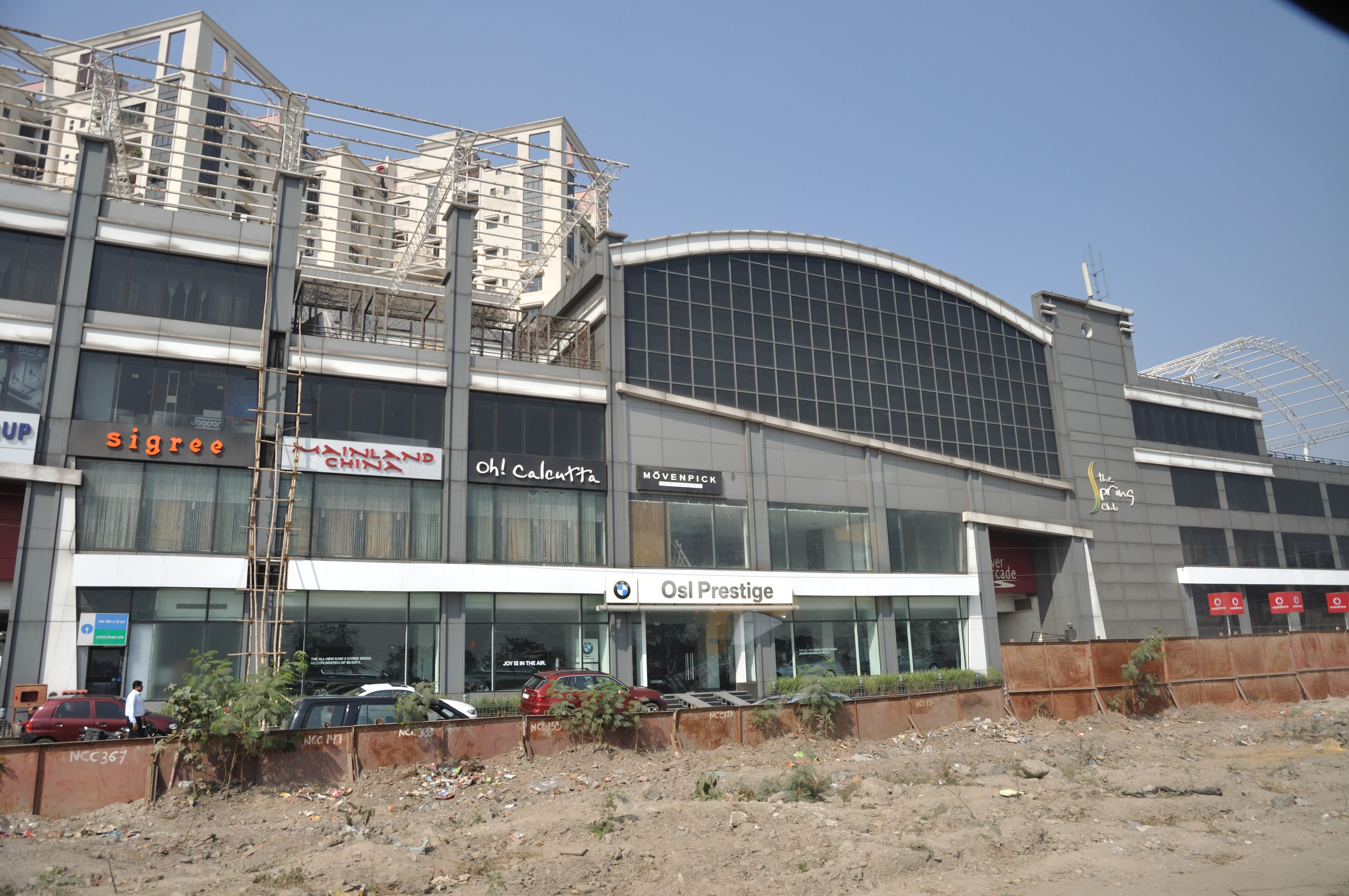
Silver Arcade, Dhapa

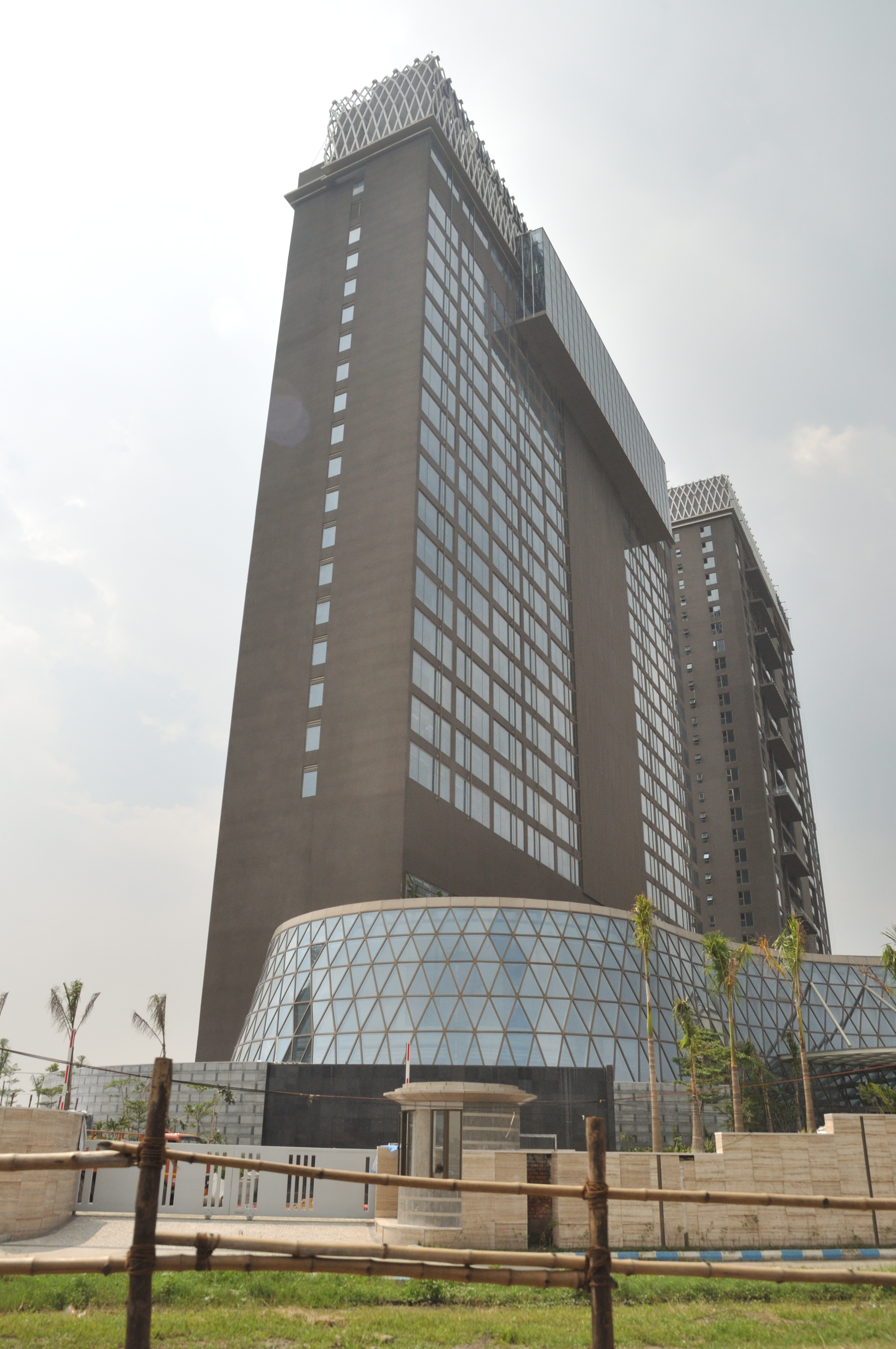
JW Marriott Hotel, Dhapa

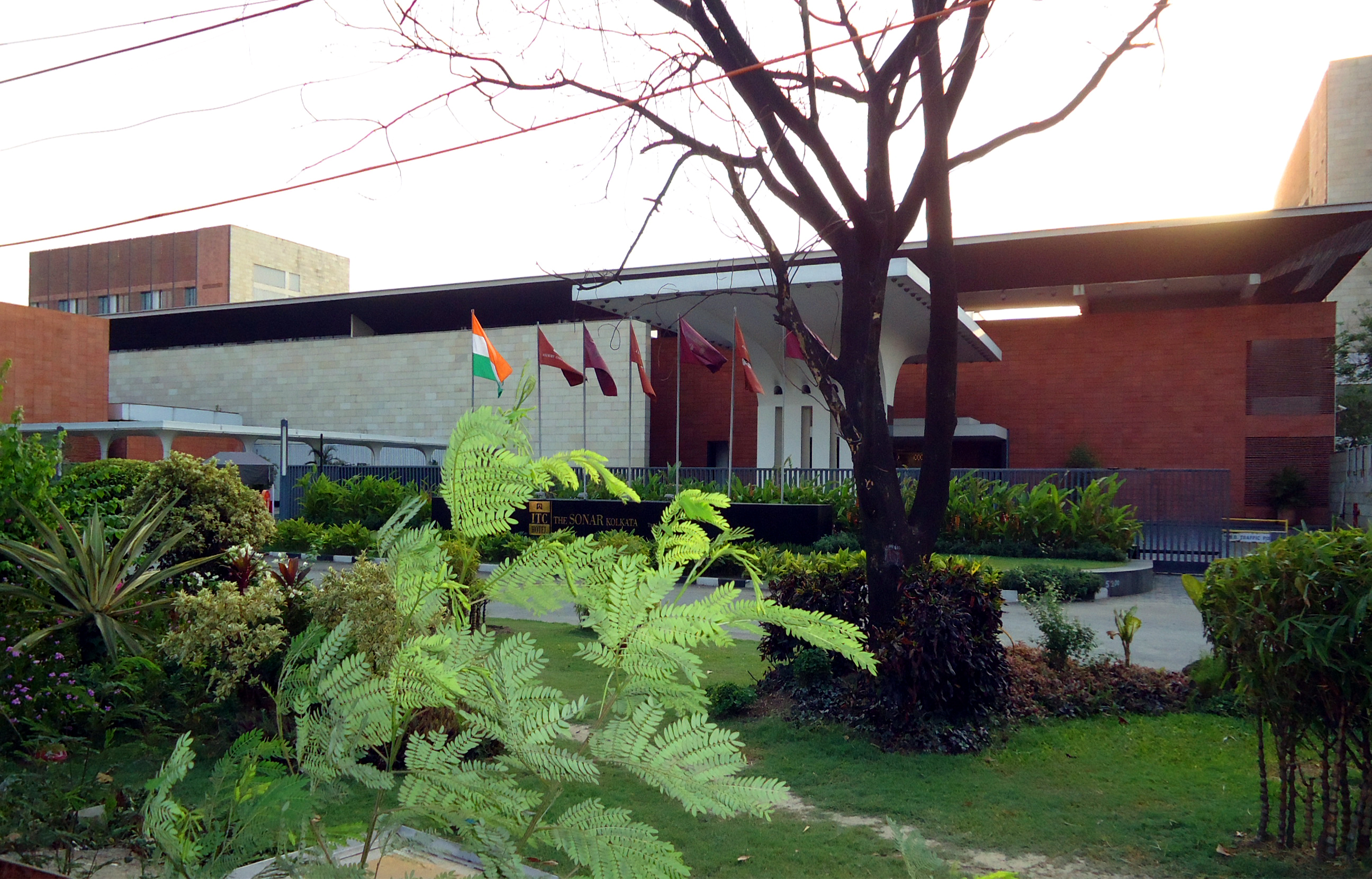
ITC Sonar facade, Dhapa

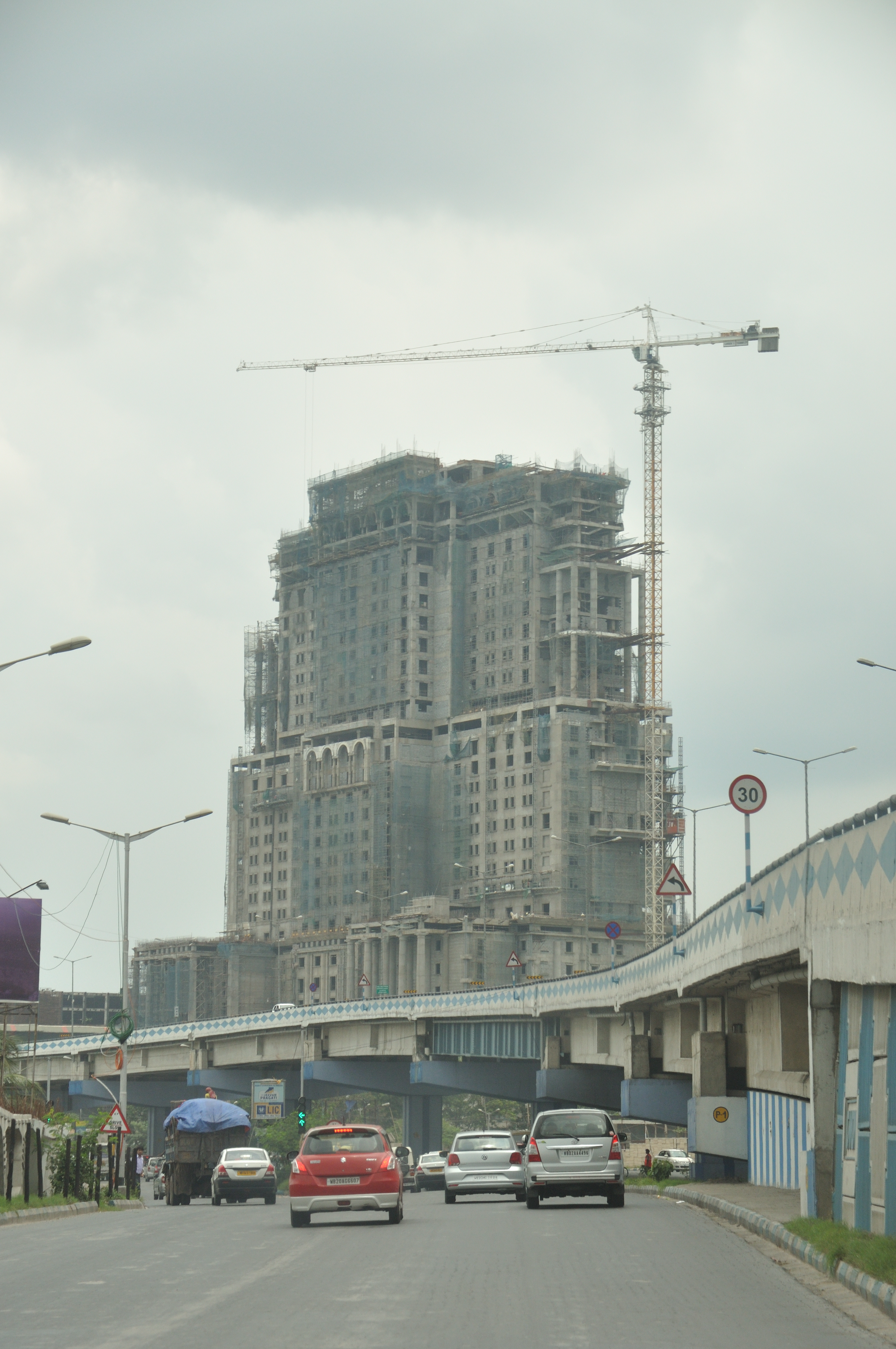
ITC Sonar Hotel (Northern Block) along with Maa Flyover, Dhapa

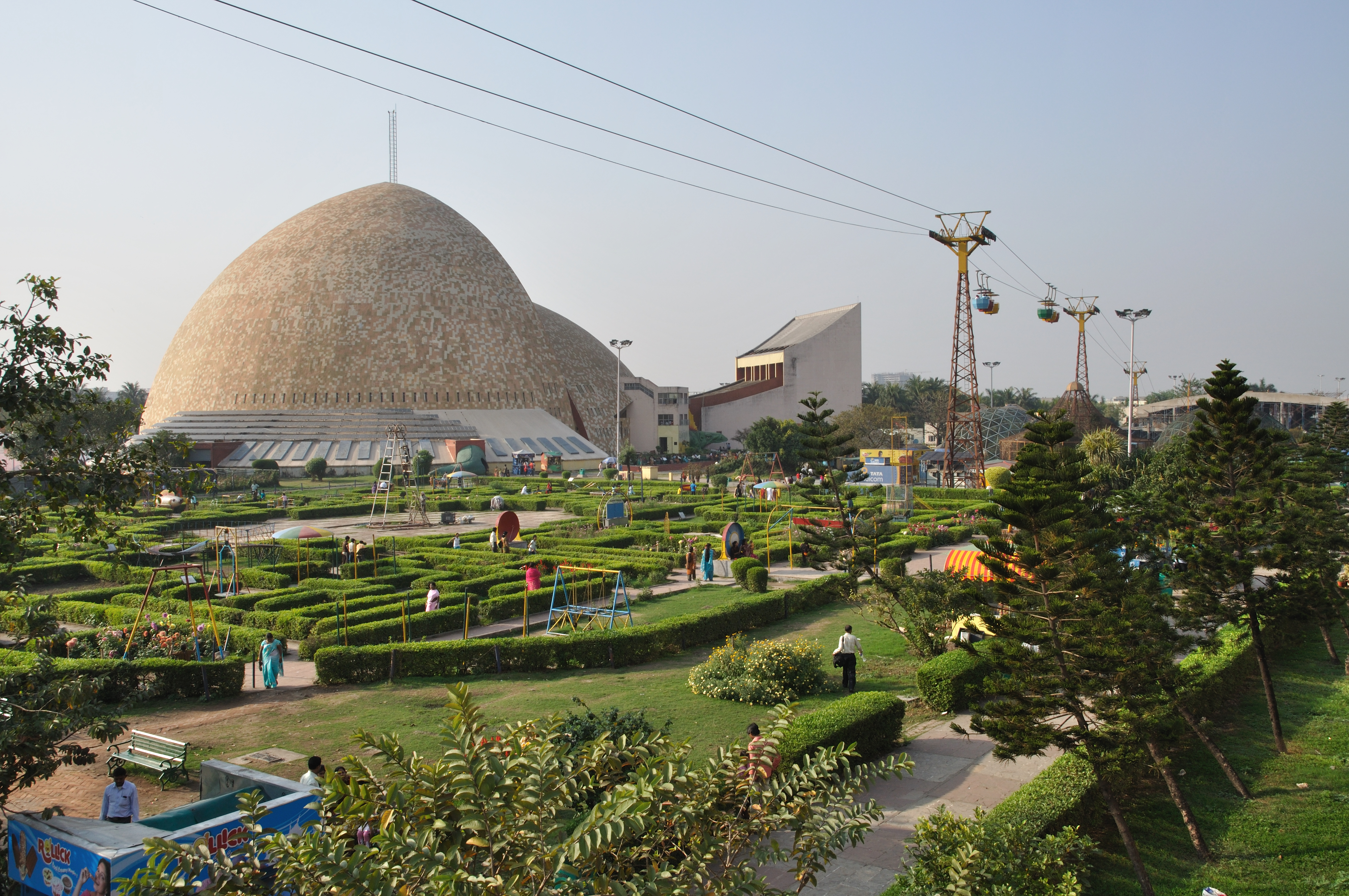
Science City, Parama Island

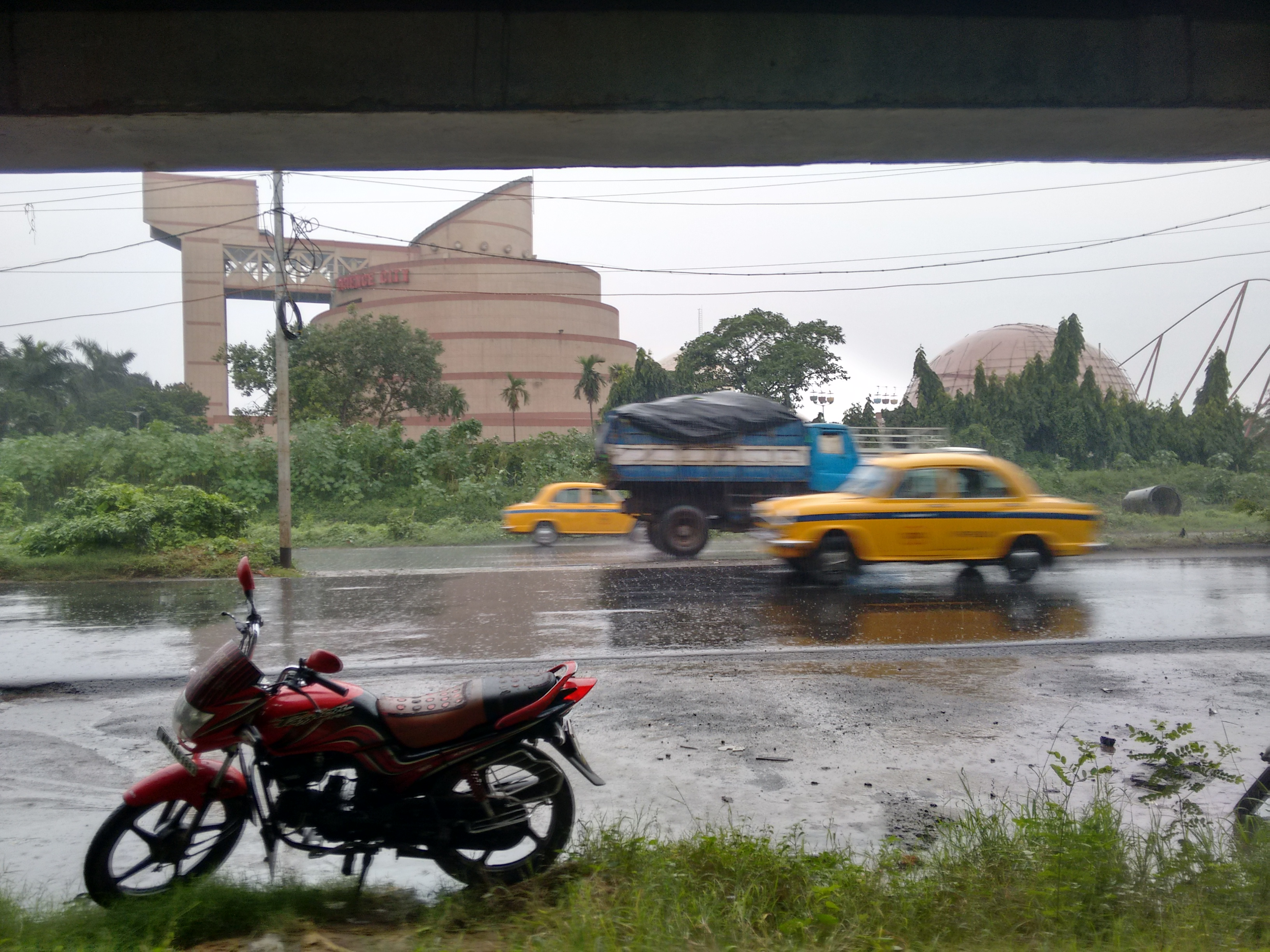
Rainy day view of Science City, Parama Island

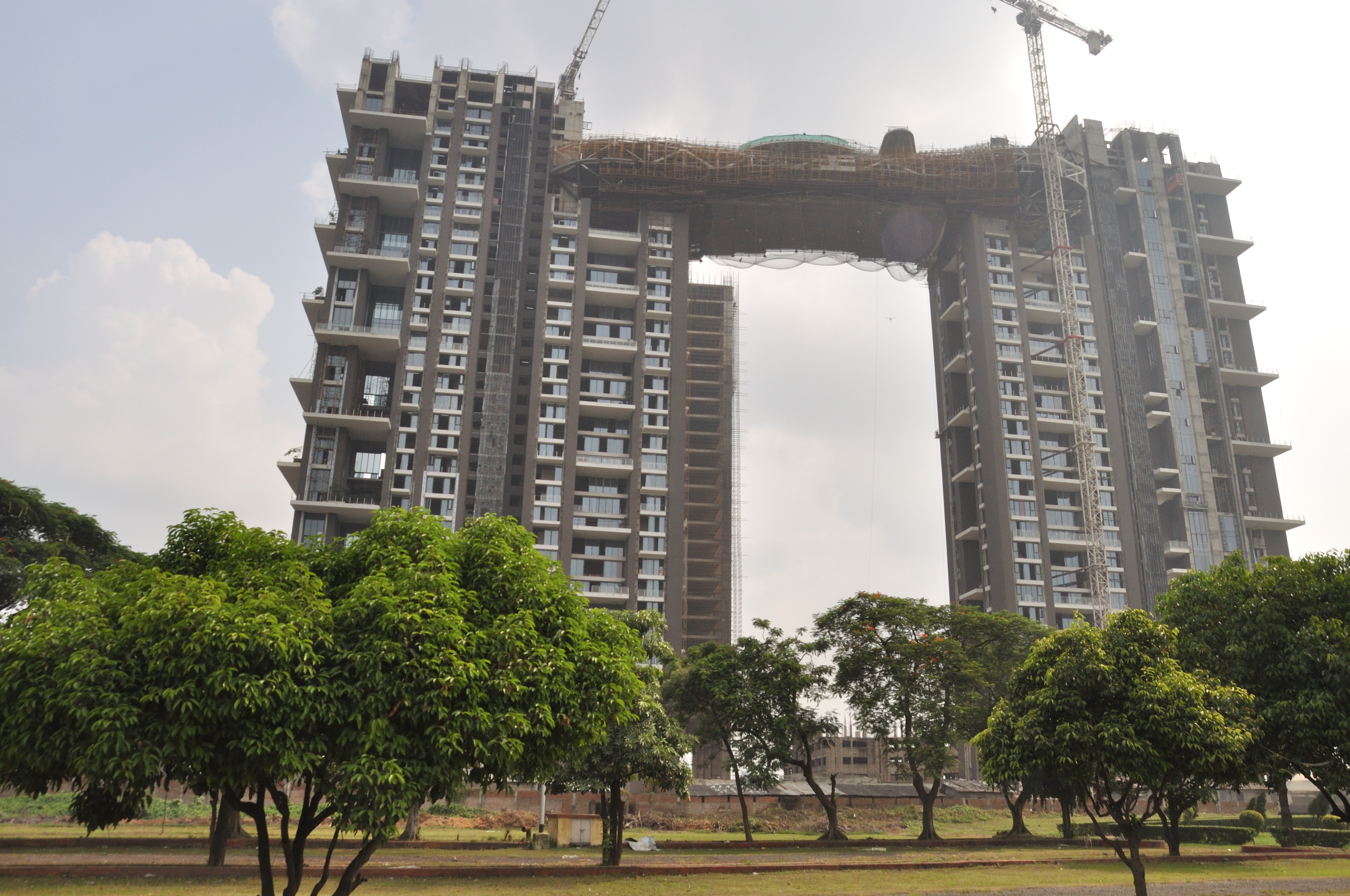
Atmosphere (Kolkata), East Topsia

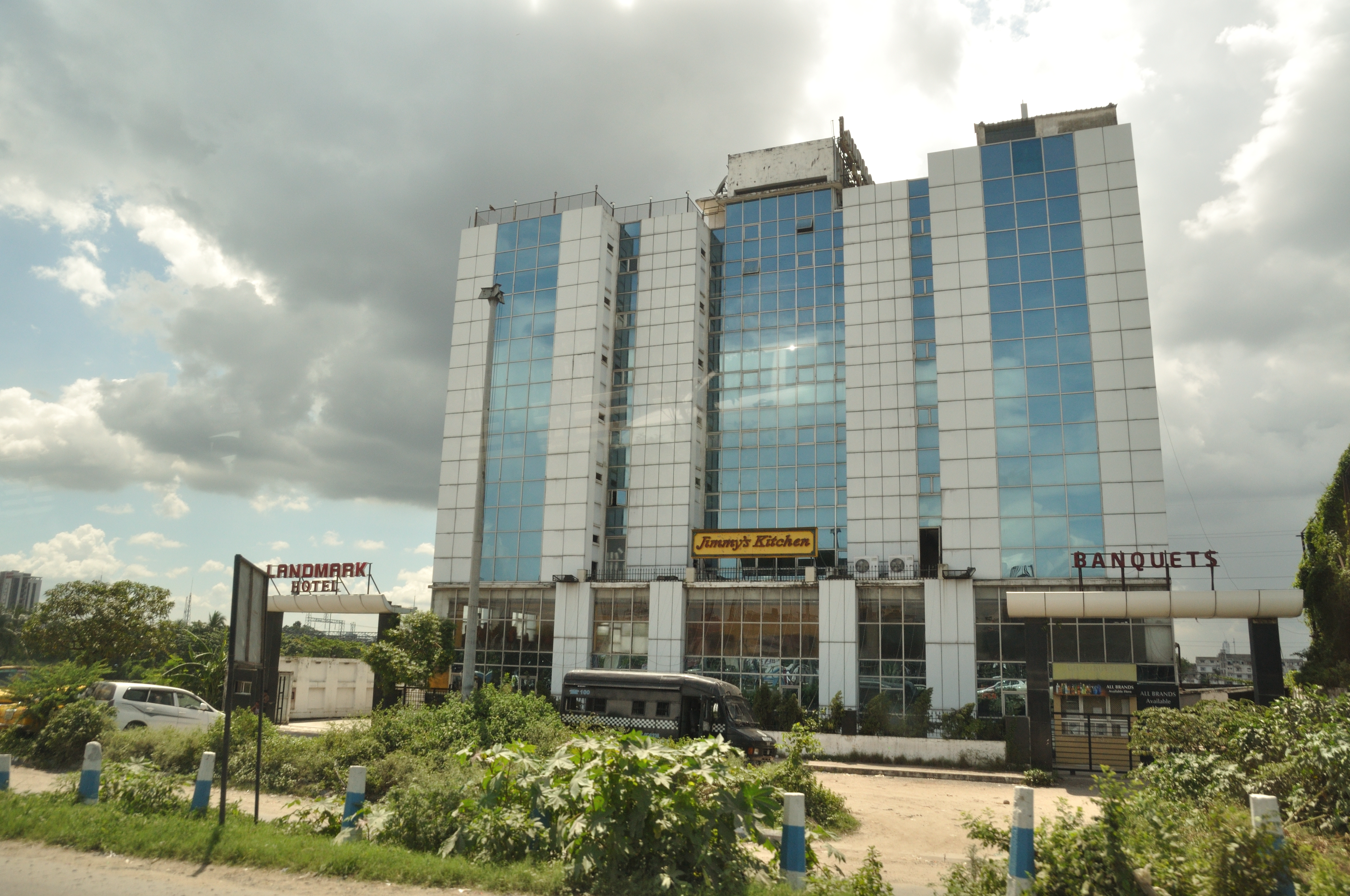
Landmark Hotel, East Topsia

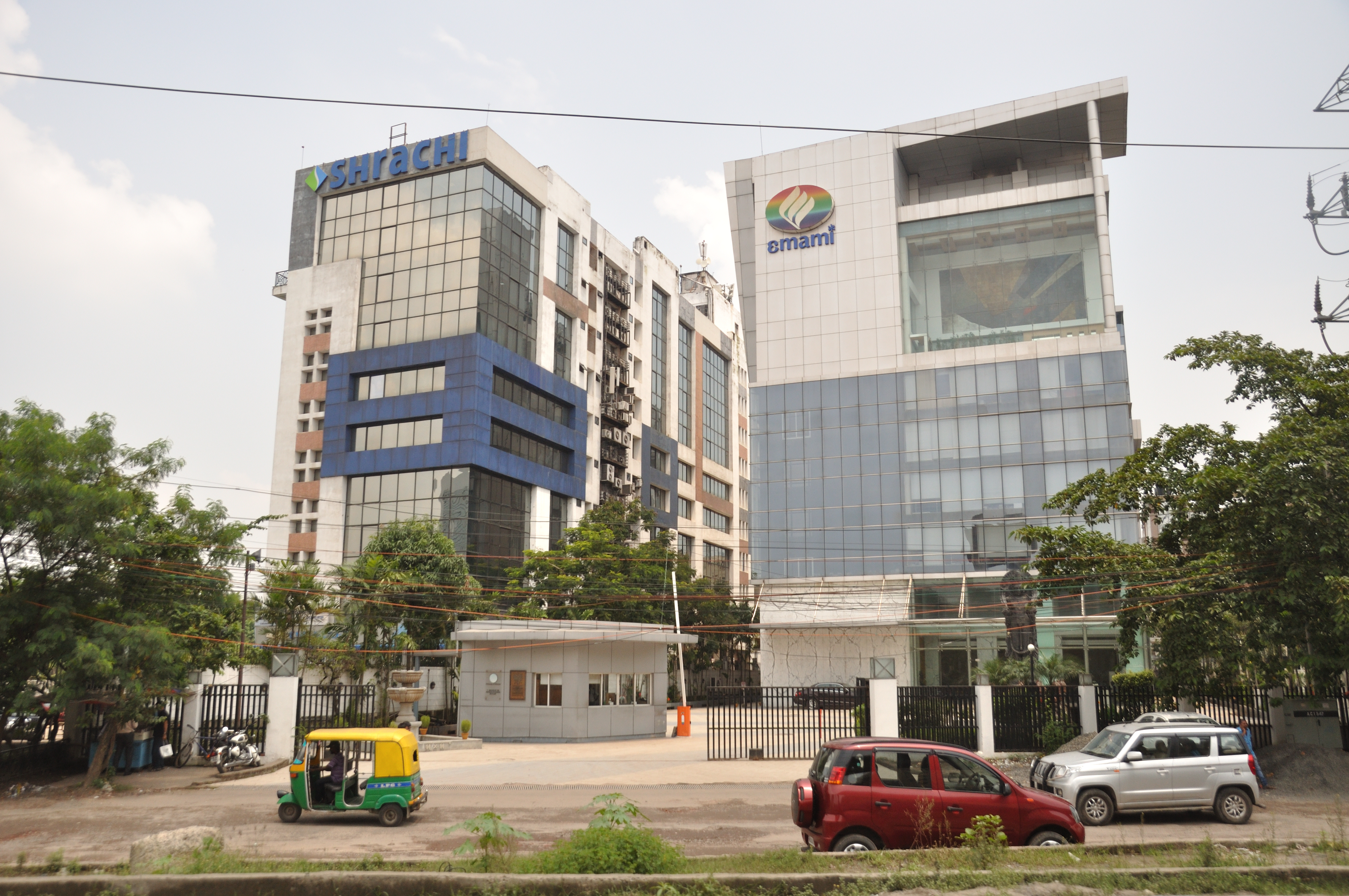
Shrachi and Emami Tower, East Kolkata Township

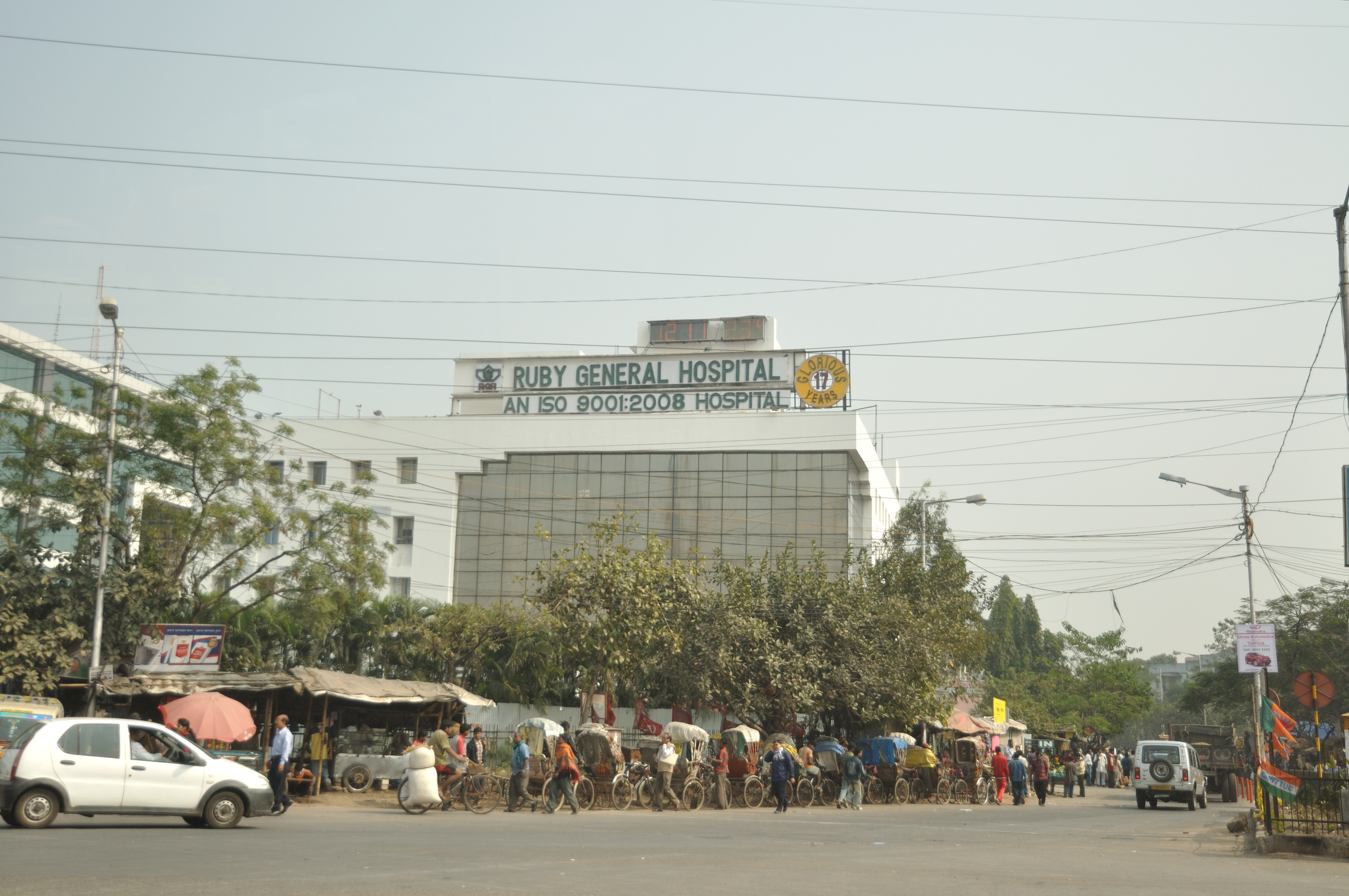
Ruby Hospital, East Kolkata Township

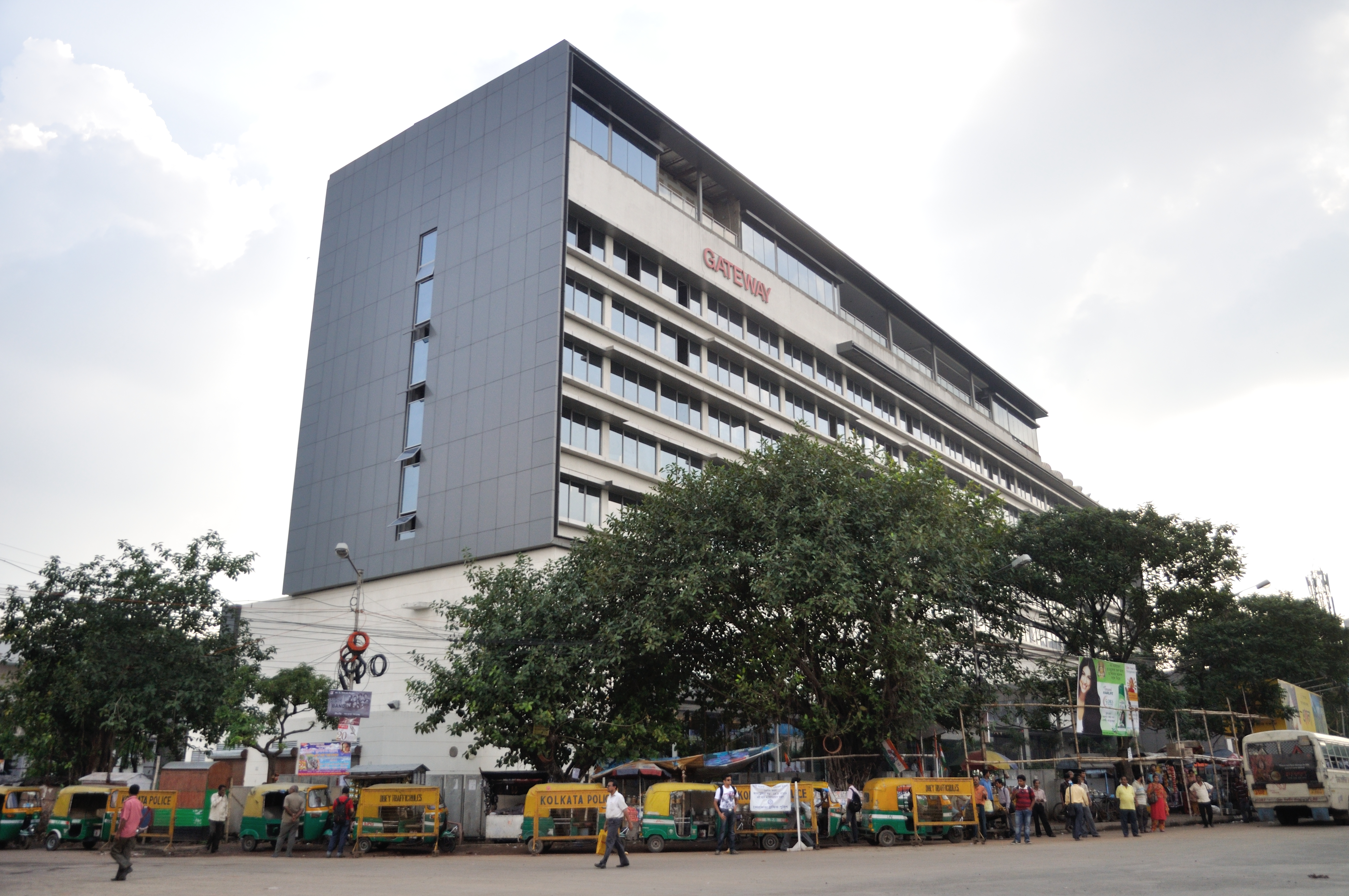
Taj Vivanta (Gateway) Hotel, East Kolkata Township

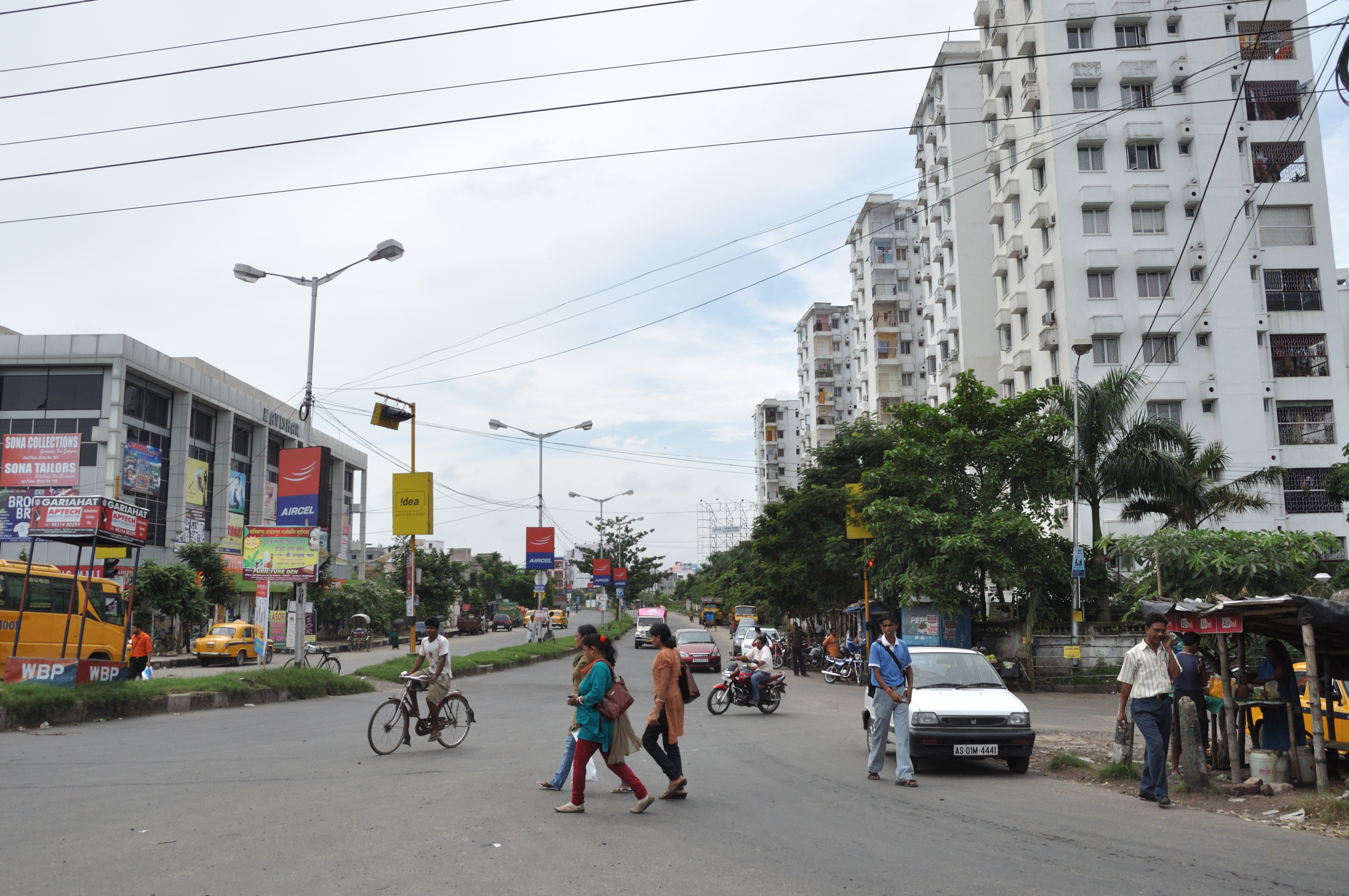
Kalikapur Abhishikta

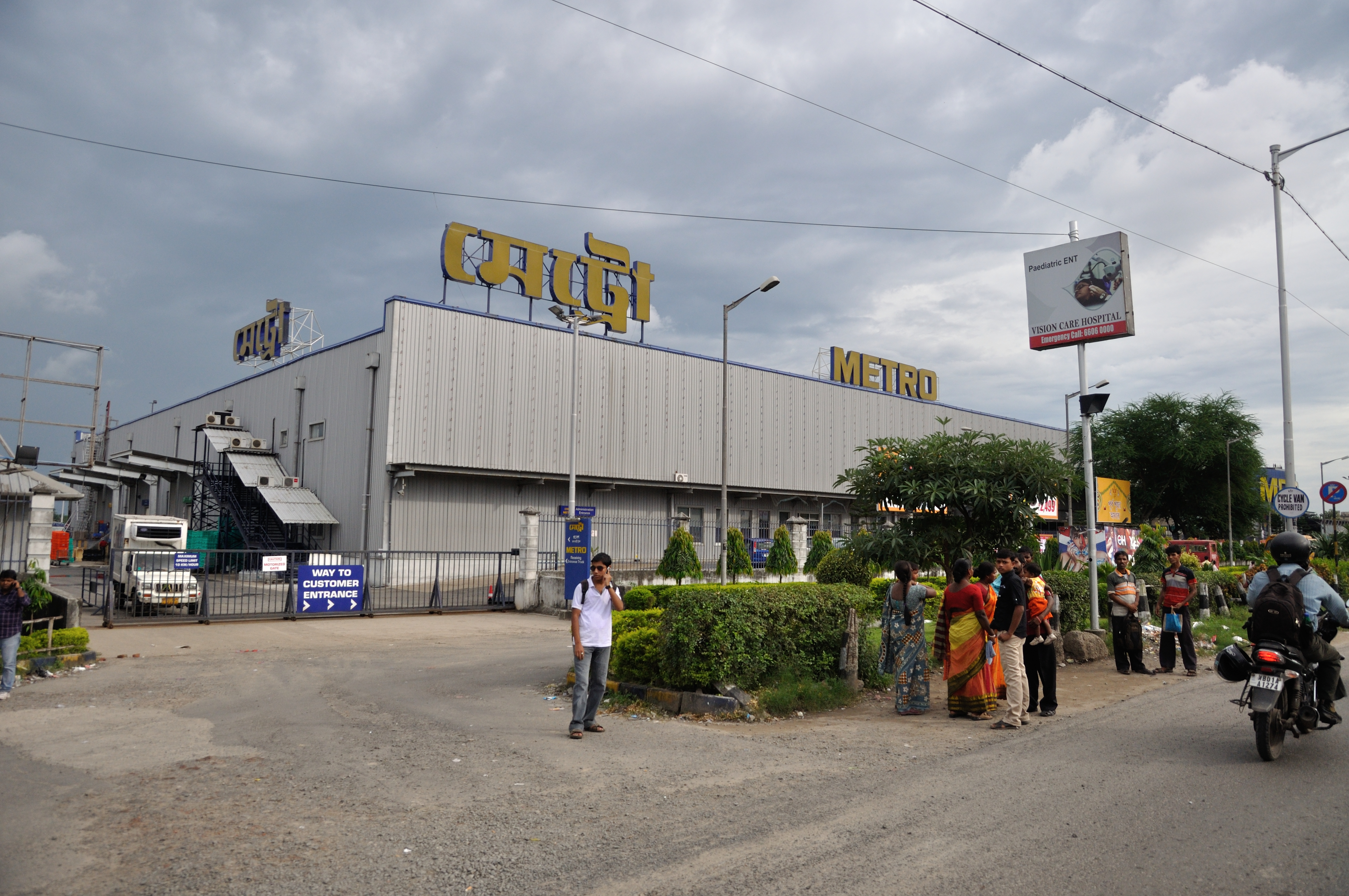
Metro Cash & Carry India Private Limited, Mukundapur

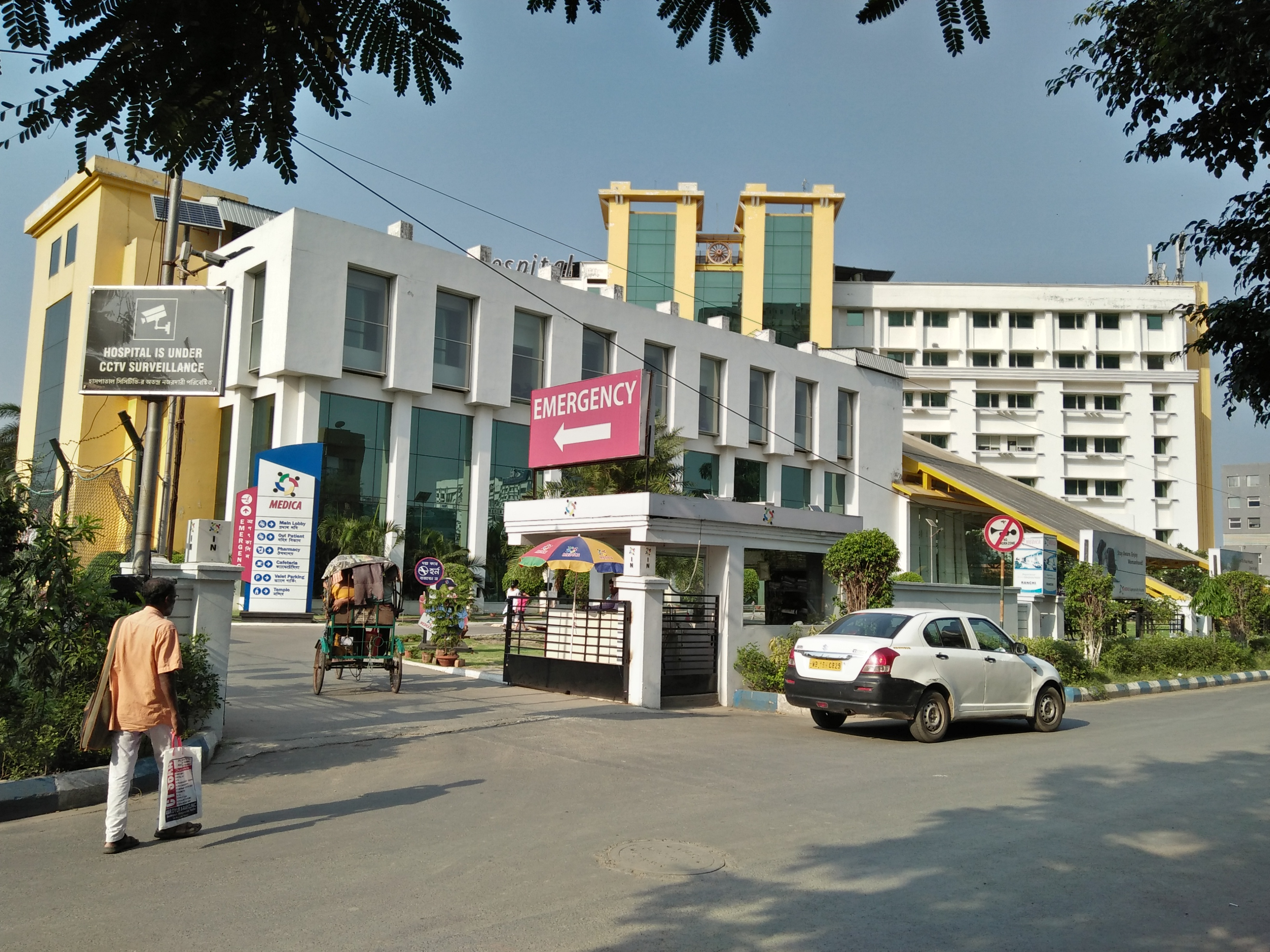
Medica Superspecialty Hospital, Mukundapur

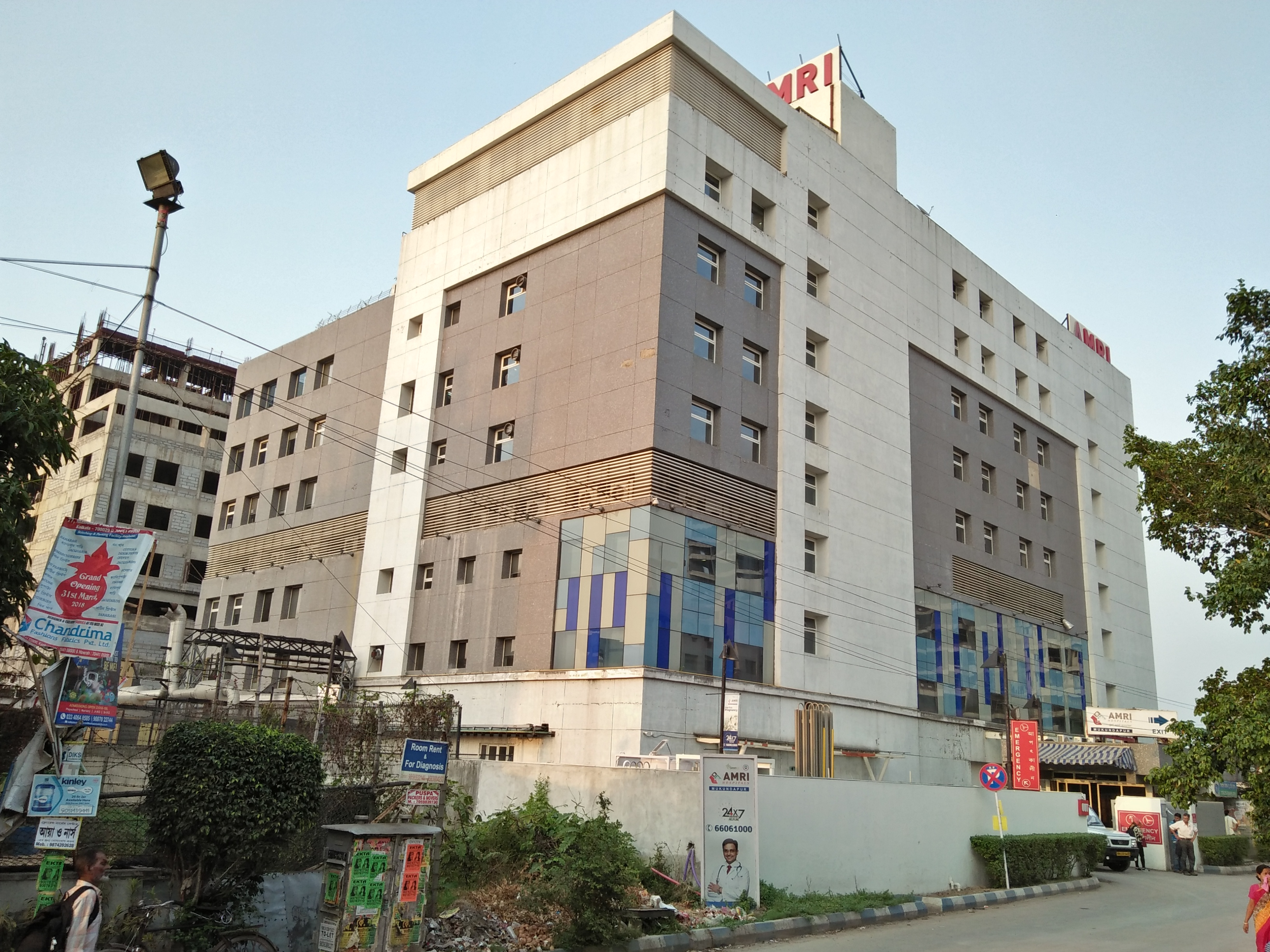
AMRI Hospital, Mukundapur

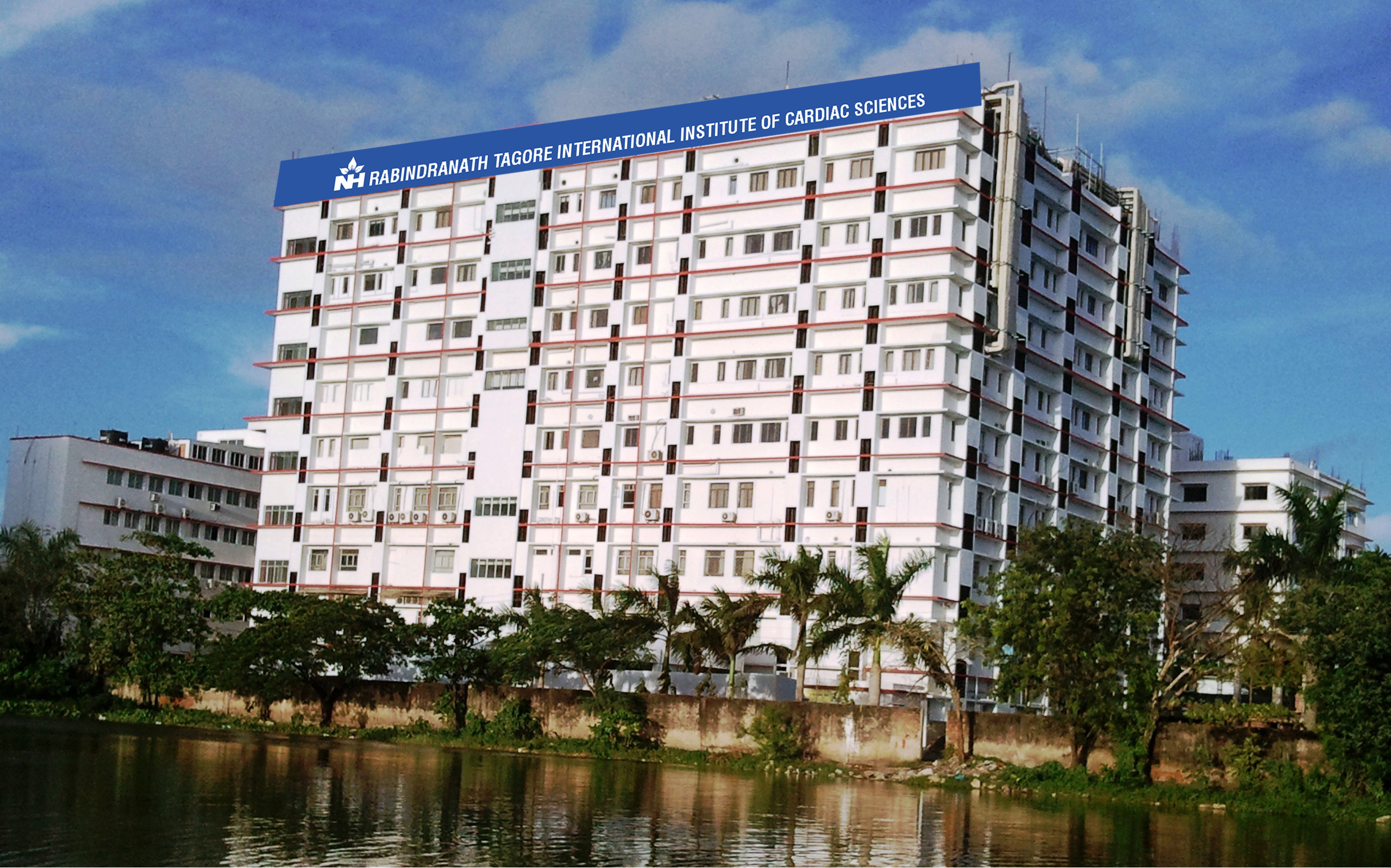
Rabindranath Tagore International Institute of Cardiac Sciences, Mukundapur

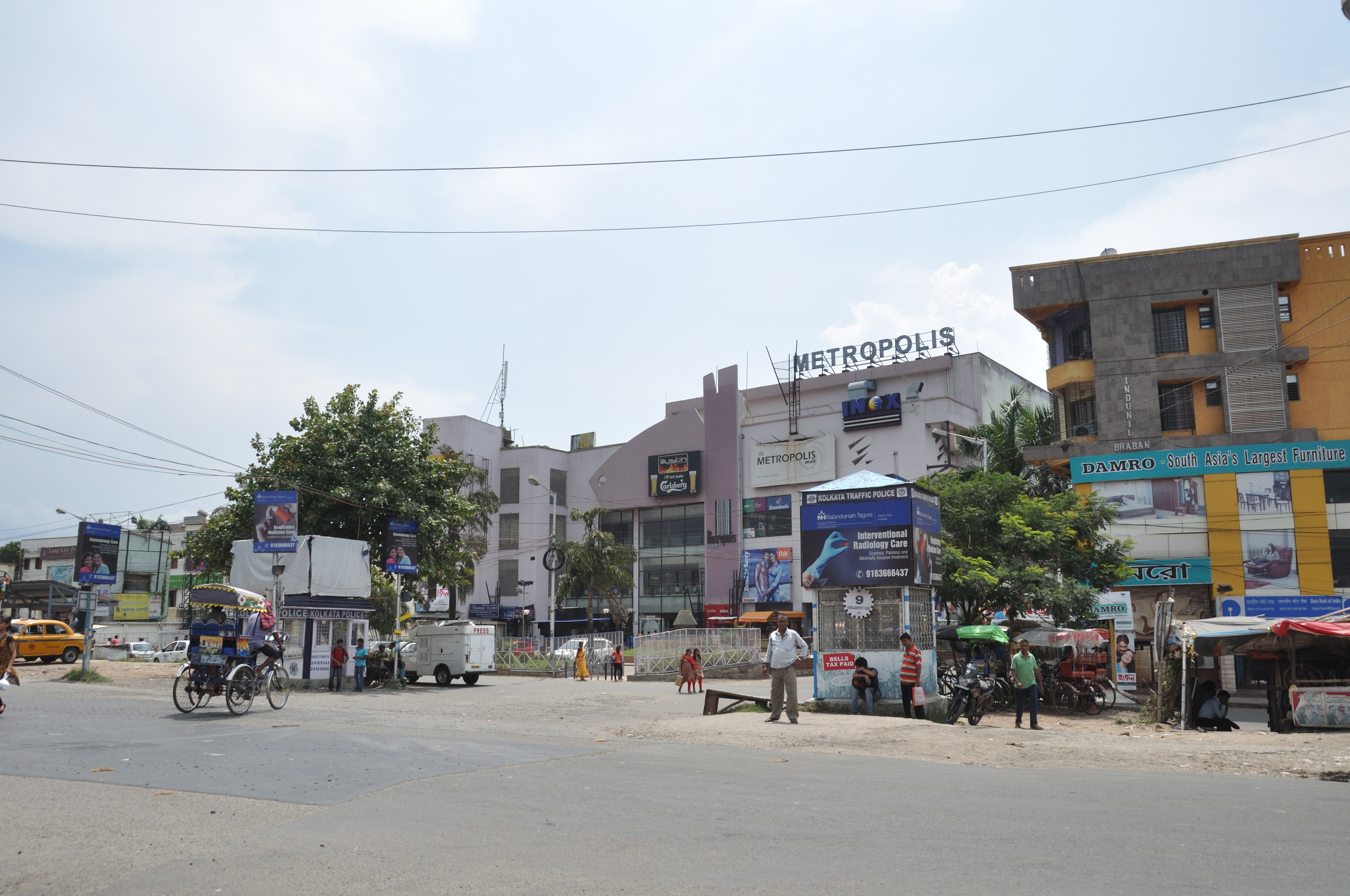
Metropolis Mall, Hiland Park

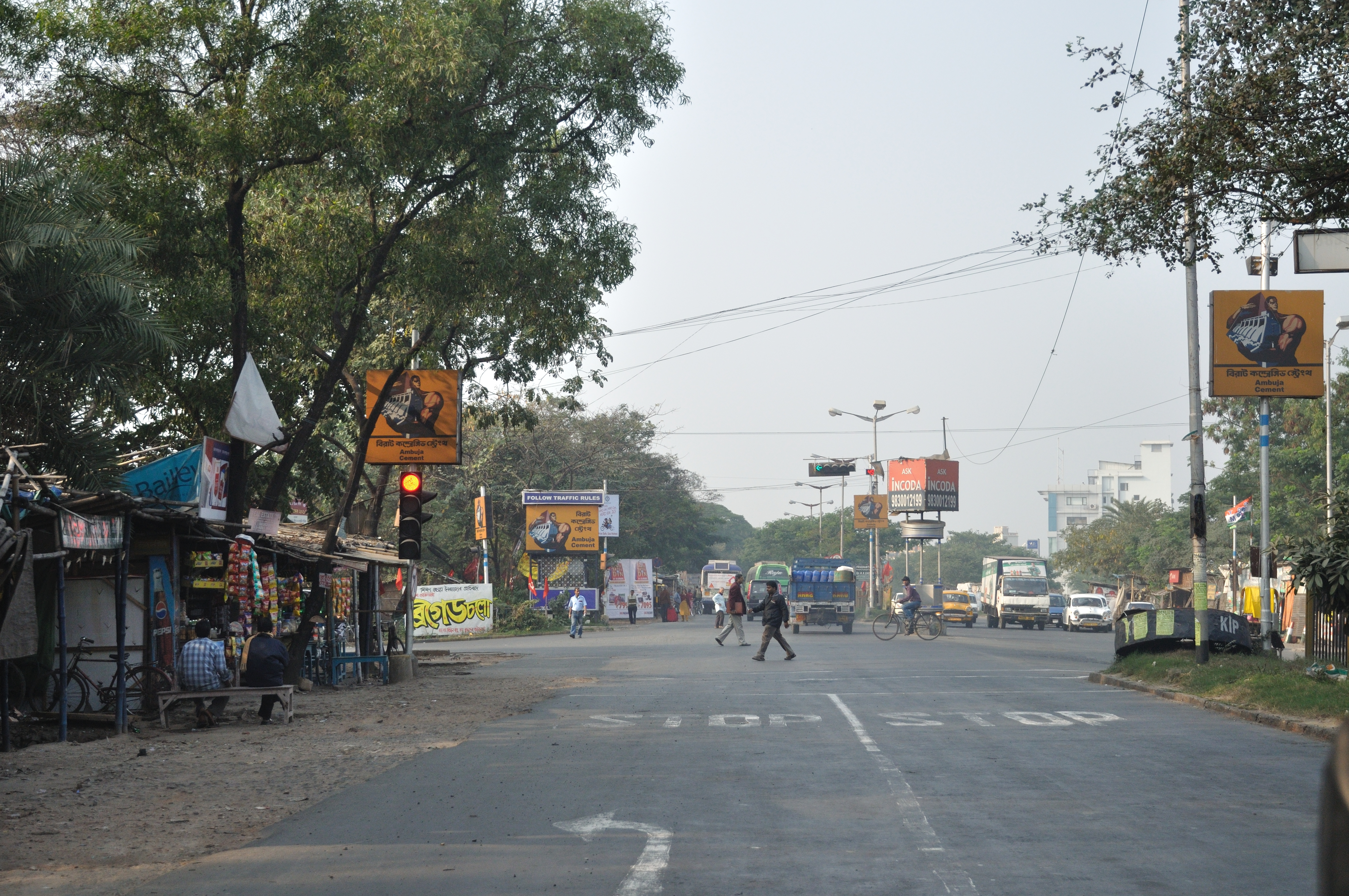
EM Bypass at Patuli Crossing
