= Satyajit Ray metro station =

Metro station in Kolkata, India

Satyajit Ray
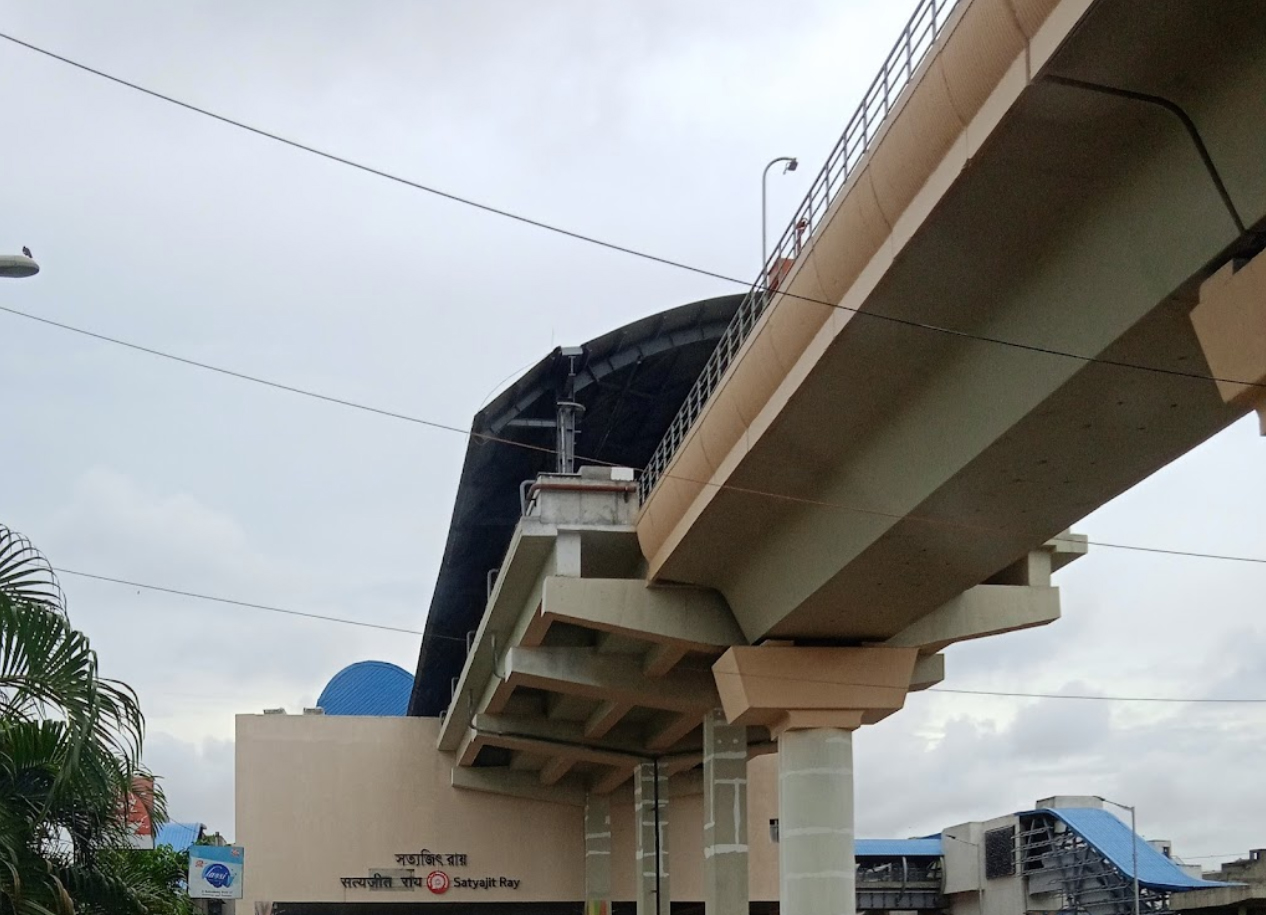
- Satyajit Ray Metro Station

General information
- Location: SRFTI, opp. Hiland Park; Baghajatin, Chak Garia; Kolkata, West Bengal 700075; India
- Coordinates: 22.4846°N 88.3926°E
- System: Kolkata Metro
- Operator: Metro Railway, Kolkata
- Line: Orange Line
- Platforms: 2 (2 side platforms)
- Tracks: 2

Construction
- Structure type: Elevated
- Accessible: Yes

Other information
- Status: Operational
- Station code: KSJR

History
- Opening: 6 March 2024; 2 years ago
- Former names: Baghajatin; Hiland Park

Services
| Preceding station | Kolkata Metro | Following station |
|---|---|---|
| Kavi Subhash Terminus | Orange Line | Jyotirindra Nandi towards Beleghata |
Route map
Location

Satyajit Ray is a metro station of Orange Line of Kolkata Metro in Chak Garia, E.M. Bypass, Kolkata, India. The station is named in honour of the prominent Bengali filmmaker Satyajit Ray.

The Kavi Subhash–Hemanta Mukhopadhyay section of Orange Line was inaugurated on 6 March 2024.

== Station Layout ==
| L2 | Side platform, Doors will open on the left |
| L2 | Platform 1 | Train towards Beleghata (Jyotirindra Nandi) → |
| L2 | Platform 2 | ← Train towards Kavi Subhash (terminus) |
| L2 | Side platform, Doors will open on the left |
| L1 | Concourse | Fare control, station agent, Metro QR ticket vending machines, crossover |
| G | Street level | Exit/Entrance |

== Gallery ==
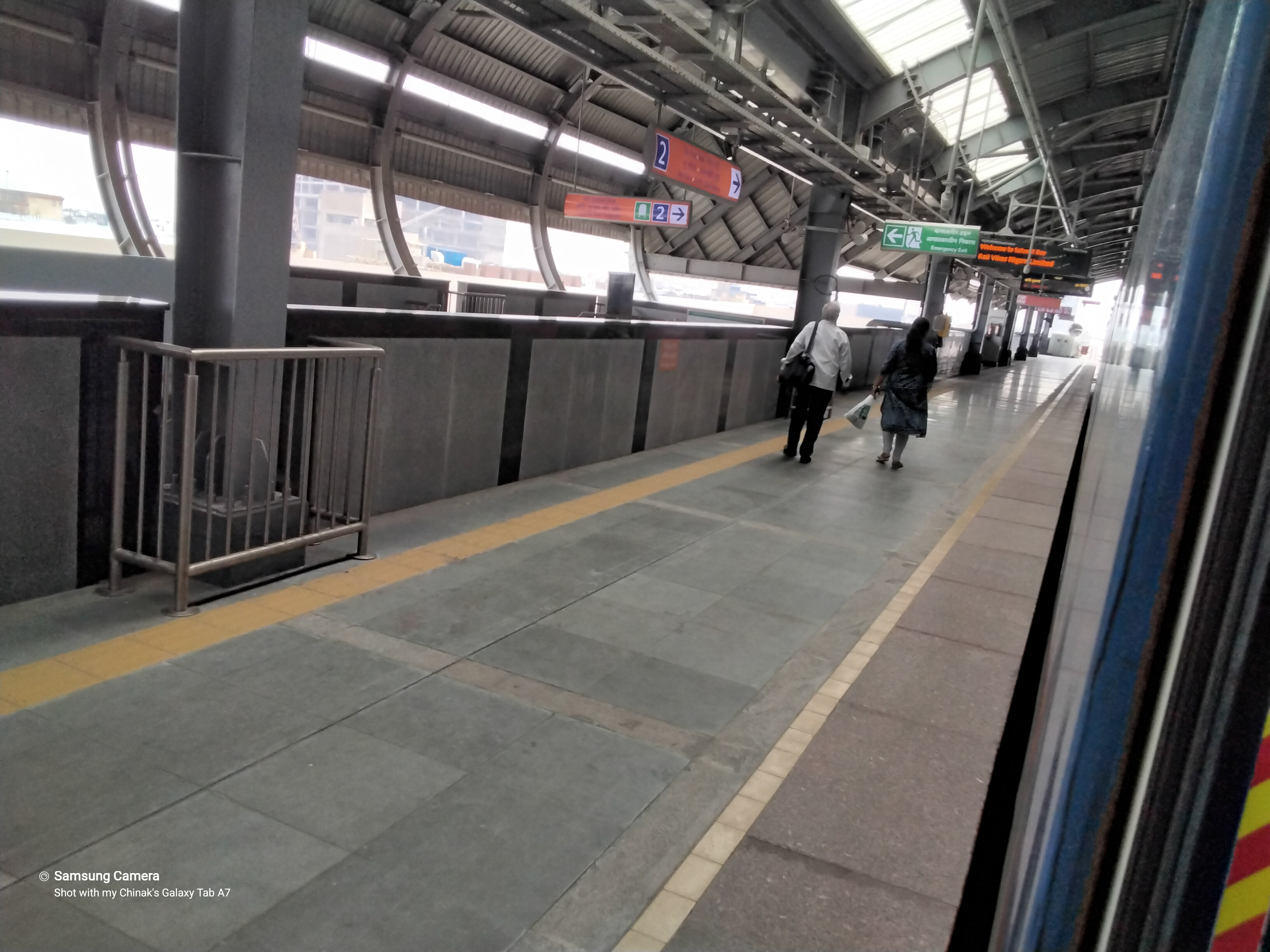

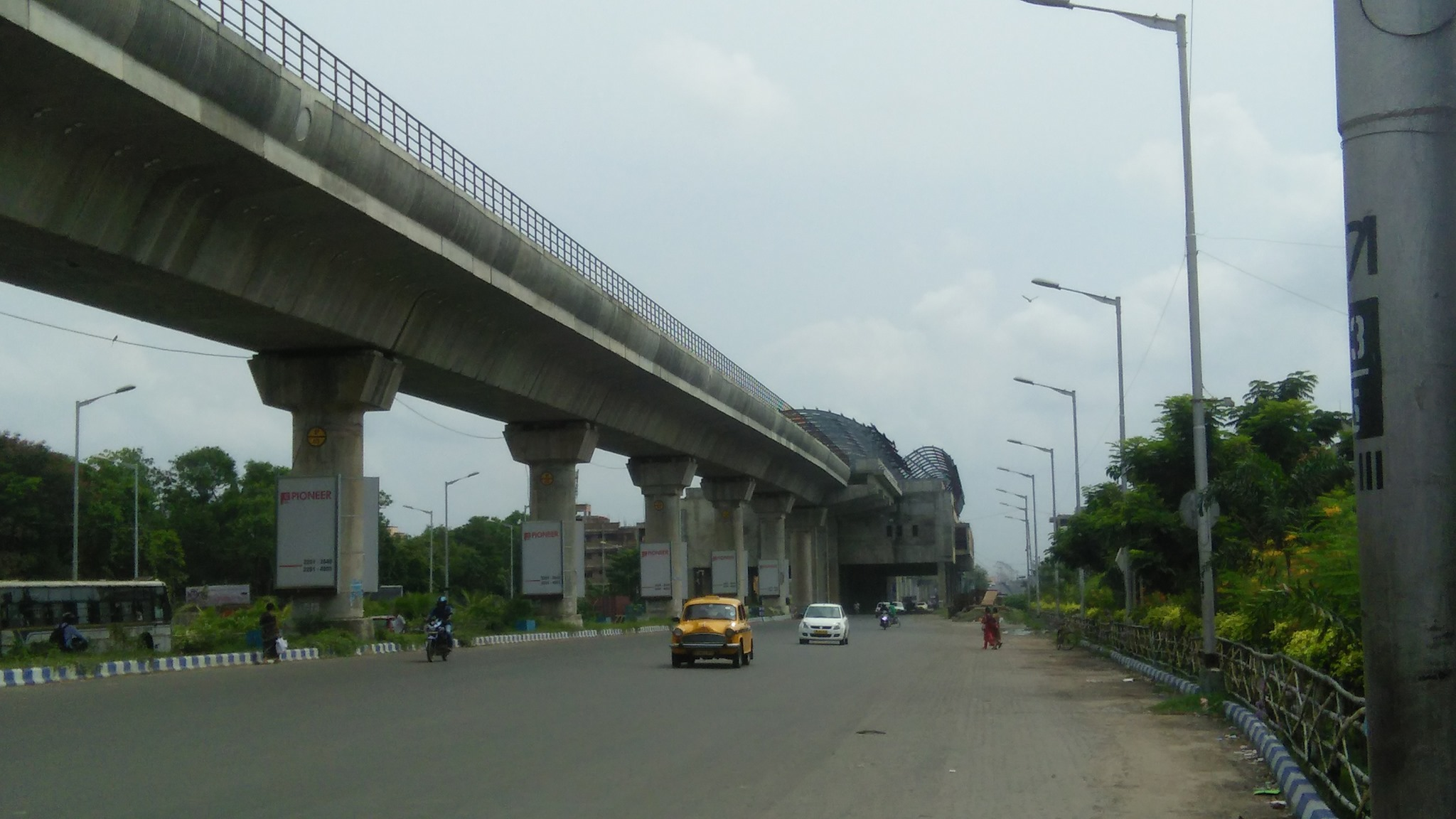

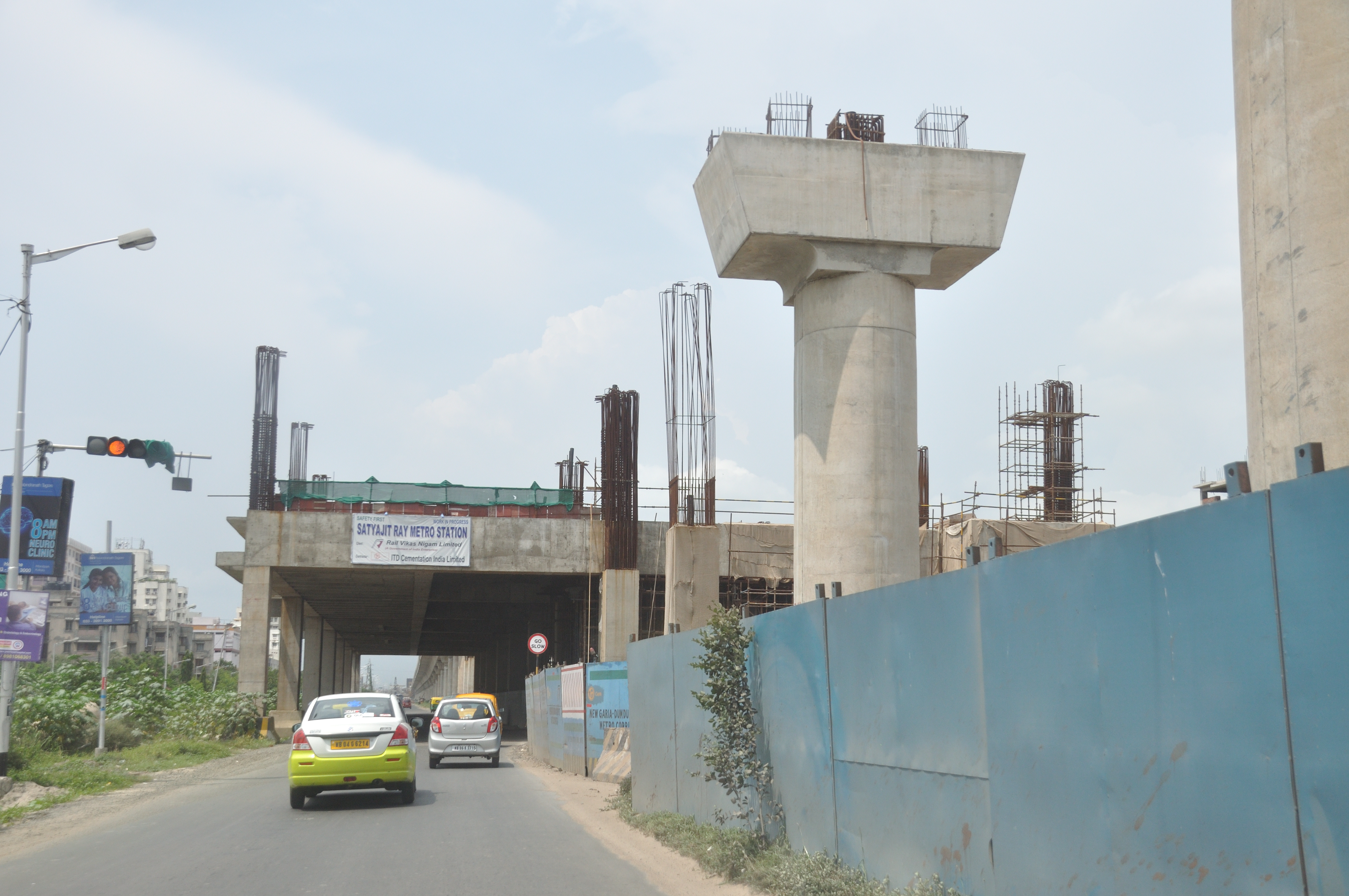

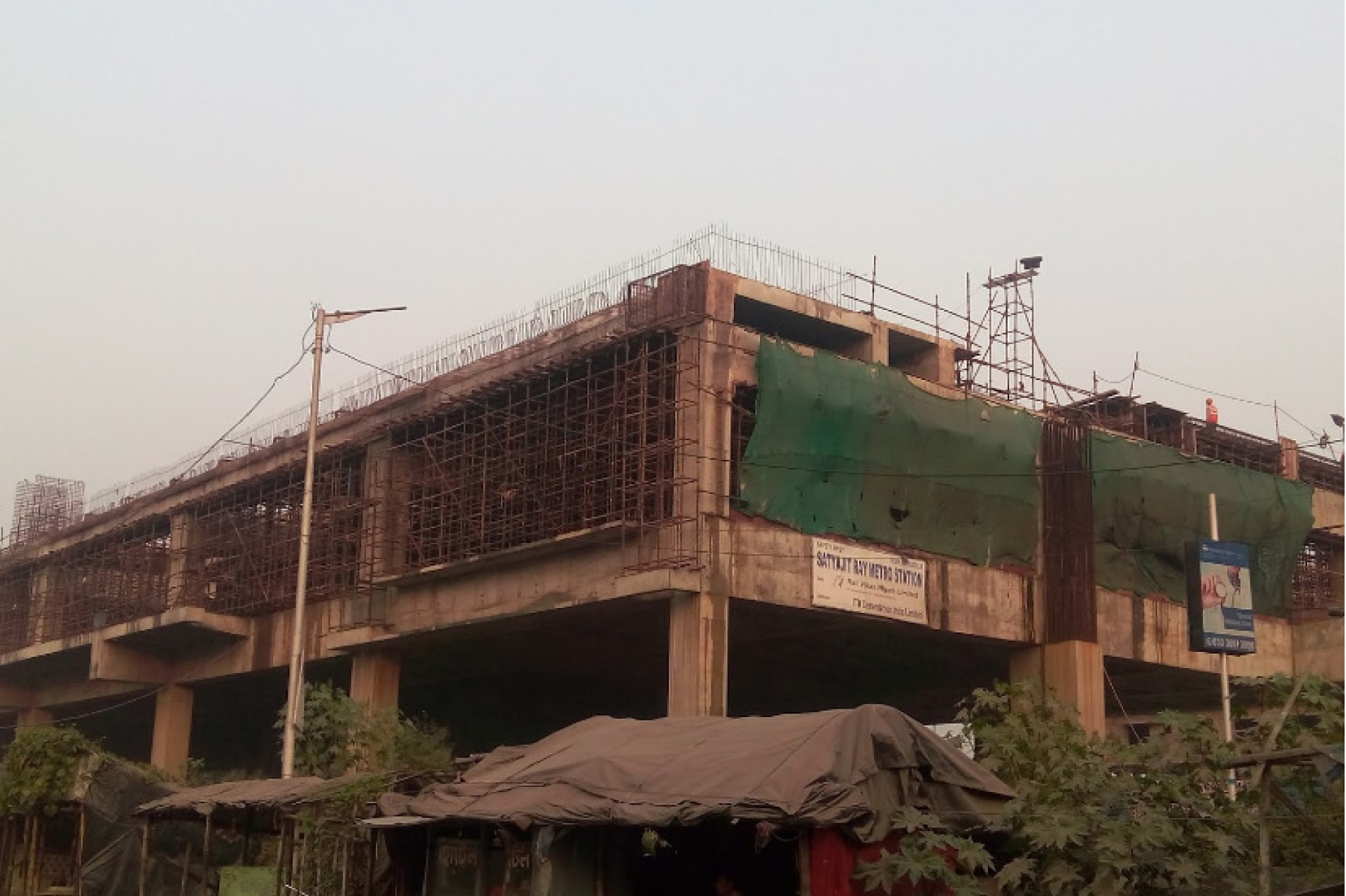

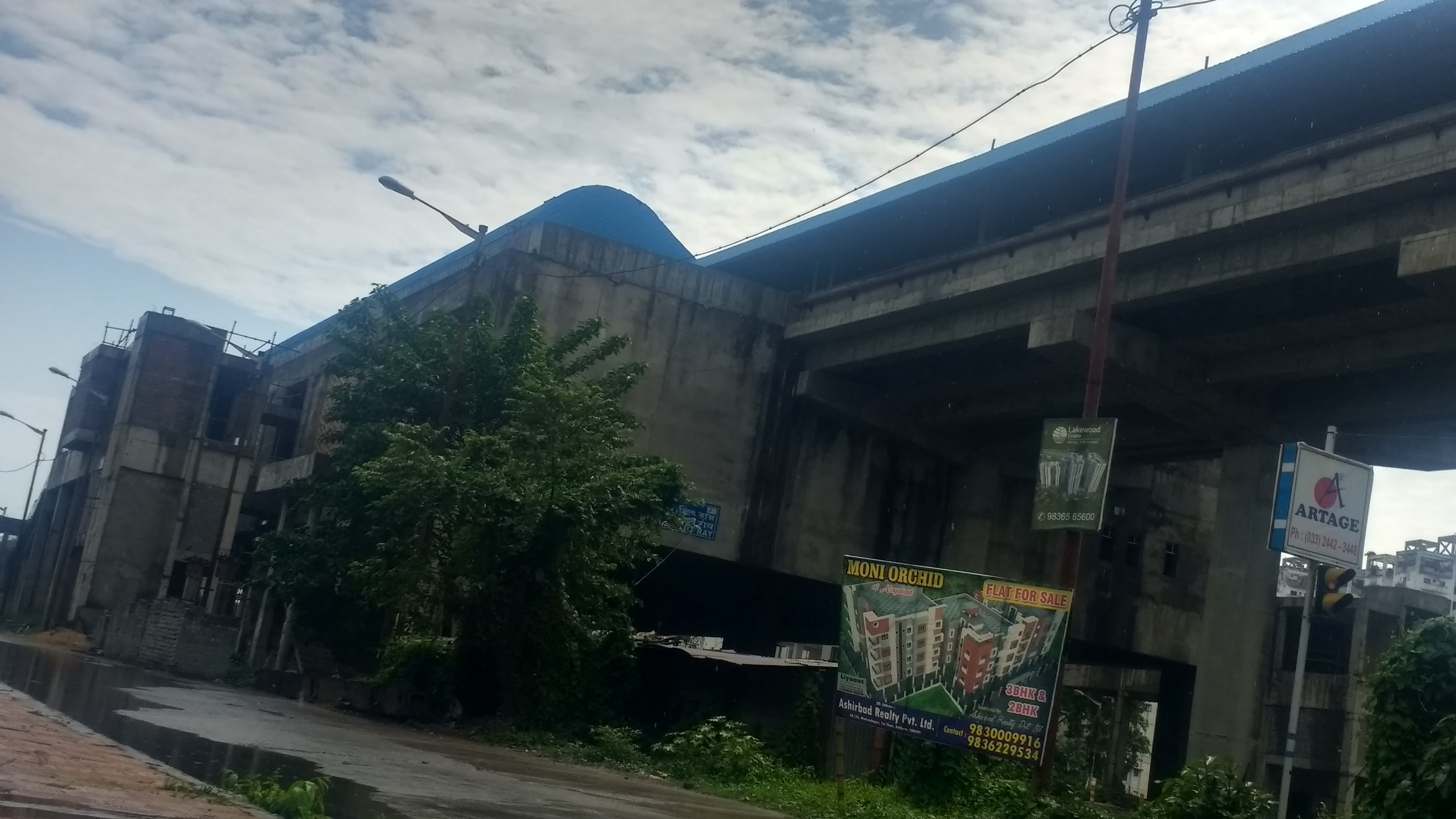

== See also ==
- List of Kolkata Metro stations
