= Katju Nagar =

Katjunagar Katju Nagar
- Neighbourhood in South Kolkata, Kolkata
- Location in Kolkata Katjunagar (West Bengal)
- Coordinates: 22.495°N 88.370°E
- Country: India
- State: West Bengal
- City: Kolkata
- District: Kolkata
- Subway/ Metro station: Rabindra Sarovar, Mahanayak Uttam Kumar
- Municipal Corporation: Kolkata Municipal Corporation
- KMC ward: 93
- Elevation: 39 ft (12 m)
- Time zone: UTC+5:30 (IST)
- PIN: 700 032
- Area code: +91 33
- Lok Sabha constituency: Kolkata Dakshin
- Vidhan Sabha constituency: Rashbehari

Katjunagar is a neighbourhood located in South Kolkata in the city of Kolkata, West Bengal, India. The adjacent neighbourhoods to the locality include Jadavpur, South City, Poddar Nagar, Jodhpur Park, Lake Gardens, Bikramgarh and Golf Green.

Some important institutes in and around the locality include Central Glass and Ceramic Research Institute, Regional Institute of Printing Technology, APC Polytechnic, Indian Association for the Cultivation of Science, Jadavpur University, Indian Institute of Chemical Biology, etc. It is well known for its proximity to South City Mall, Jadavpur University, Gariahat, Prince Anwar Shah Road, Jadavpur railway station and 8B Bus Stand.
