= Poddar Nagar =

Poddar Nagar Poddarnagar
- Neighbourhood in South Kolkata, Kolkata
- Location in Kolkata Poddar Nagar (West Bengal)
- Coordinates: 22.495°N 88.370°E
- Country: India
- State: West Bengal
- City: Kolkata
- District: Kolkata
- Subway/ Metro station: Rabindra Sarovar
- Municipal Corporation: Kolkata Municipal Corporation
- KMC ward: 93
- Elevation: 38 ft (12 m)
- Time zone: UTC+5:30 (IST)
- PIN: 700 068
- Area code: +91 33
- Lok Sabha constituency: Kolkata Dakshin
- Vidhan Sabha constituency: Rashbehari

Poddar Nagar is a neighbourhood located in South Kolkata in the city of Kolkata, West Bengal, India. The adjacent neighbourhoods to the locality include Jadavpur, South City, Katju Nagar, Jodhpur Park, Lake Gardens, Bikramgarh and Golf Green.
