= Bikramgarh =

Vickramgarh Vikramgarh
- Neighbourhood in South Kolkata, Kolkata (Calcutta)
- Location in Kolkata Vickramgarh (West Bengal)
- Coordinates: 22°29′34″N 88°21′41″E
- Country: India
- State: West Bengal
- City: Kolkata
- District: South 24 Parganas
- Subway/ Metro station: Mahanayak Uttam Kumar
- Municipal Corporation: Kolkata Municipal Corporation
- KMC ward: 95, 93
- Elevation: 36 ft (11 m)
- Time zone: UTC+5:30 (IST)
- PIN: 700 033
- Area code: +91 33
- Lok Sabha constituency: Kolkata Dakshin
- Vidhan Sabha constituency: Rashbehari, Tollygunge

Vickramgarh is a neighbourhood located of the southern part of Kolkata, in West Bengal, India. The neighbourhood shares its boundary with Jadavpur, Katju Nagar, South City, Golf Green and Tollygunge.
