= Lake Gardens =

Lake Gardens লেক গার্ডেন্স
- Neighbourhood in Kolkata (Calcutta)
- Location in Kolkata
- Coordinates: 22.50355°N 88.3492°E
- Country: India
- State: West Bengal
- City: Kolkata
- District: Kolkata
- Metro Station: Rabindra Sarobar
- Municipal Corporation: Kolkata Municipal Corporation
- KMC ward: 93
- Elevation: 11 m (36 ft)
- Time zone: UTC+5:30 (IST)
- PIN: 700 045
- Area code: +91 33
- Lok Sabha constituency: Kolkata Dakshin
- Vidhan Sabha constituency: Rashbehari

Lake Gardens is a neighbourhood of South Kolkata, in Kolkata district, West Bengal, India. It has Kalighat to the north, Jodhpur Park to the east, Prince Anwar Shah Road or Tollygunge to the south and Charu Market to the west.

The famous Golf Course of Tollygunge is a couple of kilometres away and south of Lake Gardens.

Aban Mahal and Rabindra Sarobar are some of the tourist attractions in the vicinity. It is well known for its proximity to South City Mall, Jadavpur University, Tollygunge tram depot, Rabindra Sarobar. For its excellent connectivity to all parts of the city, the real estate rates are one of the highest in Kolkata city.

== Transport ==
Rabindra Sarobar metro station is only 5 mins auto ride from the locality and through the main road you can get state bus, private bus, mini bus, volvo bus, auto and all forms of public transport available in Kolkata.

The great transport connection to important parts of city including Howrah, Sealdah, Gariahat, Esplanade, Salt Lake makes it one of the best sought after places in Kolkata.
