= Dhakuria =

- Neighbourhood in Kolkata (Calcutta)
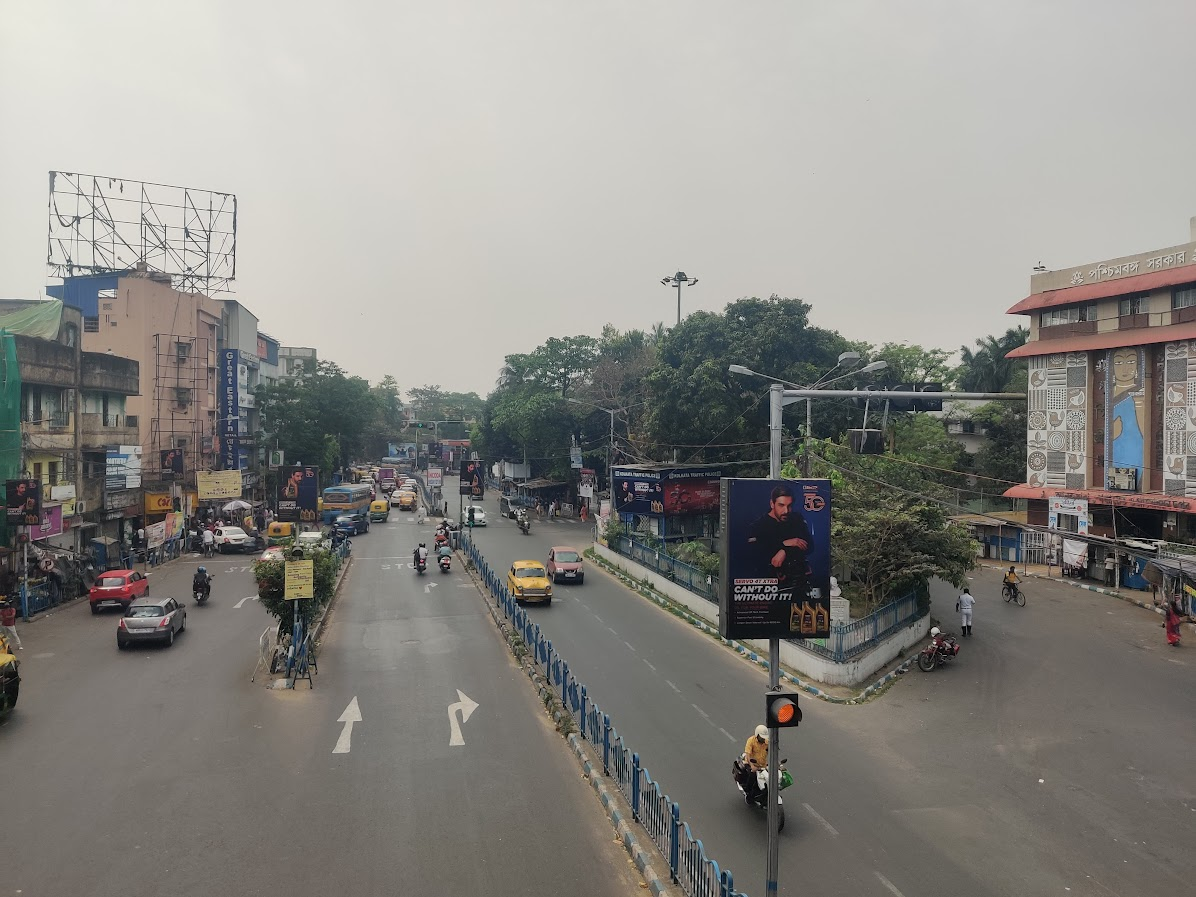
- Dhakuria Bus Stand

- Location in Kolkata
- Coordinates: 22.5104°N 88.3711°E
- Country: India
- State: West Bengal
- City: Kolkata
- District: Kolkata
- Kolkata Suburban Railway: Dhakuria
- Metro Station: Kalighat; Rabindra Sarobar; Hemanta Mukherjee; Kavi Sukanta
- Municipal Corporation: Kolkata Municipal Corporation
- KMC wards: 90, 91, 92, 93
- Time zone: UTC+5:30 (IST)
- Area code: +91 33
- Lok Sabha constituency: Kolkata Dakshin
- Vidhan Sabha constituency: Rashbehari, Kasba

Dhakuria is a locality of South Kolkata in Kolkata district in the Indian state of West Bengal. It is surrounded by Ballygunge and Kasba in the north, Haltu in the east, Jadavpur/ Garia in the south and Lake Gardens/ Jodhpur Park in the west.

== History ==
The history of Dhakuria stretches back to the early 1800s. Even after large scale modernization in the last few decades, there are several buildings that still exist today that predate 1900.

The rapid population growth of Dhakuria, similar to rest of the City of Kolkata, can be traced back to the late fifties. At the time the southern city limits were up to Ballygunge Lake areas (now known as Golpark). By the early sixties, the neighbouring locality Jodhpur Park had also become an attractive spot for several upscale single-family residential home development projects.

The areas beyond the Eastern railway tracks at Golpark started developing with large numbers of people settling in. The area was very different from the neighbouring Ballygunge. While Ballygunge dotted the homes of the rich, wide tree-lined roads (at Golpark, Southern Avenue), Dhakuria was marked with comparatively narrow lanes and bylanes. The nomenclature of most of the sub localities of this area bears the mark of age-old family dominances viz. Roypara, Bannerjeepara, Daspara, Ghoshpara, Mukherjeepara, Biswaspara, Naskarpara etc. The Pakrashi's were amongst the first few families who came and started residing here (the early 1820s). The Dhakuria Kalibari was also founded by the Pakrashi family.

After the introduction of Dakshinapan, a multi-storied shopping mall and one of the first of its kind in Kolkata, (at the west boundary of Dhakuria in the early 80s), the area started getting an upmarket look. Since then, Dhakuria's population is swelling with well-educated, middle-class people because of its schools, low crime rate and proximity to other important locations. Four Kolkata Municipal Corporation (KMC) wards are spread all over Dhakuria (Wards 90, 91, 92 and 93). Dhakuria is currently under the Rashbehari Assembly and Kasba Assembly Territory. Both Assembly Territories are under Kolkata Dakshin Parliamentary Constituency.

== Transport ==
Dhakuria is well-connected to other parts of Kolkata through various modes of public transportation.

=== Bus ===
- 37 (Dhakuria - Howrah Stn)
- 37A (Dhakuria - Howrah Stn)
- S-5 (Garia - Howrah Stn)
- AC-5 (Garia - Howrah Stn)
- E-1 (Jadavpur 8B - Howrah Stn)
- 1B (Ramnagar - Nayabad)
- 13C (Puratan Dakghar - Baghajatin)
- 45 (Airport Gate no 1 - Patuli)
- 80B (Garia - Esplanade)
- 218 (Baruipur - Babughat)
- 223 (B.T College - Golf Green)
- 234 (Belgharia - Golf Green)
- 240 (Baghbazar - Golf Green)
- S-101 Mini (Garia - B.B.D Bag)
- S-104 Mini (Jodhpur Park - B.B.D Bag)
- S-106 Mini (Santoshpur - B.B.D Bag)
- S-110 Mini (Golf Green - Howrah Stn)
- KB-17 (Garia - Rajabazar)
- SD 4 (Jadavpur - Thakurpukur)
- SD 16 (Mukundapur - Sirakol)

=== Metro ===
The area is in proximity to several metro stations on the Kolkata Metro's Blue and Orange lines :

- Kalighat metro Station (Blue Line)
- Rabindra Sarobar Metro Station (Blue Line)
- Tollygunge Metro Station (Blue Line)
- Kavi Sukanta Metro Station (Orange Line)

=== Railway ===
Dhakuria railway station is a significant stop on two important suburban rail lines:

- Sealdah–Diamond Harbour line
- Sealdah–Namkhana line

=== Roads ===
The locality benefits from its proximity to major thoroughfares:

- Gariahat Main Road
- Eastern Metropolitan Bypass
- Prince Anwar Shah Road

=== Auto-rickshaws ===
Several auto-rickshaw routes serve Dhakuria, providing connectivity to neighbouring areas such as:

- Kasba
- Garia
- Golpark

This network of transportation options ensures that Dhakuria remains easily accessible from various parts of the city.

== Notable residents ==
- Suchitra Bhattacharya, eminent writer.
- Sandhya Mukherjee, Musician
- Goutam Ghose, Filmmaker, Actor, Cinematographer
- Chiranjeet Chakraborty, Actor
- Bhanu Banerjee, Actor
- Pritish Chakraborty eminent Bollywood Actor, Producer, Director, Singer, Writer
- Chuni Goswami, footballer
- Purna Das Baul Samrat, Musician
- Jogen Chowdhury, Painter

== Healthcare ==
- Manipal Hospital, Dhakuria
- EEDF Hospital, Jodhpur Park
- Ashoka Nursing Home

== Education ==
- Jodhpur Park Boys School
- The Modern Academy
- Lake Point School
- Paresh Nath Balika Vidyalaya
- Carmel Convent School
- St. Andrews School
- Binodini Girls' High School
- Ramchandra School

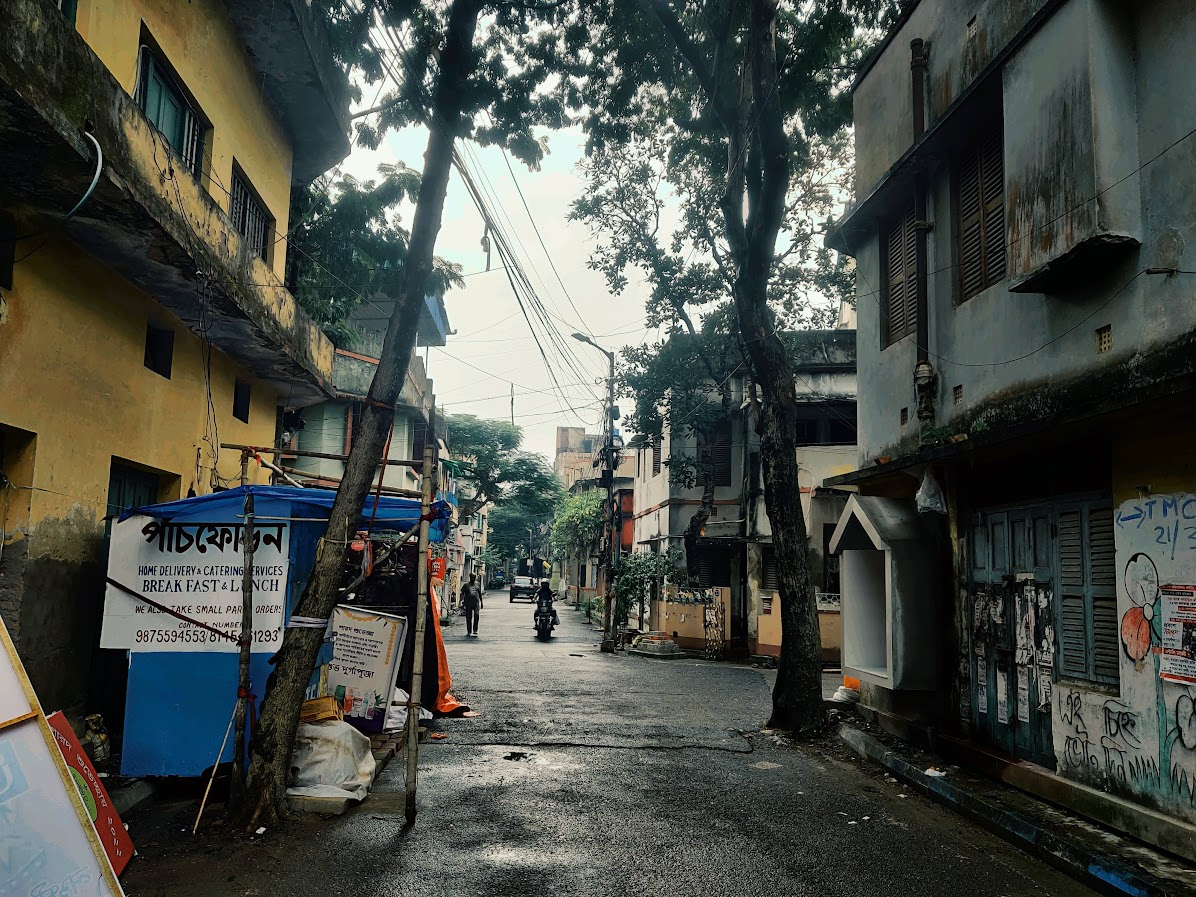

== See also ==
- Dhakuria (Vidhan Sabha constituency)
- Jadavpur
- Jodhpur Park
