= Healthcare in Kolkata =

The health care system in Kolkata consists of 48 government hospitals, mostly under the Department of Health & Family Welfare, Government of West Bengal, and 366 private medical establishments during 2010.

== Health indicators ==
According to the 2005 National Family Health Survey, only a small proportion of Kolkata households are covered under any health scheme or health insurance. The total fertility rate in Kolkata is 1.4, which is the lowest among the cities surveyed. In Kolkata, 77 percent of the married women use contraceptive, which is the highest among the cities surveyed; but use of modern contraceptive methods is the lowest (46 percent). Infant mortality rate in Kolkata is 41 per 1000 live births, and mortality rate for children below five is 49 per 1000 live births.

Among the surveyed cities, Kolkata stands second (5 percent), where the children have not received any vaccination under Universal Immunization Programme. Kolkata stands second among the surveyed cities, with 57 percent of the children between 0 and 71 months has the reach to an anganwadi centre under the Integrated Child Development Services (ICDS) programme.Percentage of malnutrition, anemic and underweight children in Kolkata is less in comparison to other surveyed cities.

== Diseases ==
About 30 percent of the women and 18 percent of the men in Kolkata are obese. Kolkata has the highest percentage (55 percent) of woman who are having anaemia among the surveyed cities, while 20 percent of the men in Kolkata are anaemic. Large number of people suffers from diseases like diabetes, asthma, goitre and other thyroid disorders. Tropical diseases like malaria, dengue and chikungunya are prevalent in Kolkata, though their incidence is decreasing.

== Health infrastructure ==
As of 2010, there are 48 government hospitals, mostly under the Department of Health & Family Welfare, Government of West Bengal, and 366 private medical establishments during 2010. For every 10,000 people in the city, there are 61 hospital beds, which is higher than the national average of 9 hospital beds per 10,000. Ten medical colleges are located in the Kolkata metropolitan area which act as tertiary referral hospitals in the state. Calcutta Medical College, founded in 1835, was the first Asian institution to teach modern medicine. These facilities are inadequate to meet the healthcare needs of the city. More than 78 percent in Kolkata prefer the private medical sector over public medical sector, due to the poor quality of care, the lack of a nearby facility, and excessive waiting times at government facilities.

=== Medical colleges ===
- Medical College and Hospital, Kolkata, College Street
- Nil Ratan Sarkar Medical College and Hospital, Sealdah
- R.G.Kar Medical College, Belgachia
- Calcutta National Medical College, Beniapukur
- S.S.K.M. Medical College, Bhowanipore
- Sagar Dutta Memorial Medical College and Hospital, Kamarhati
- KPC Medical College and Hospital, Jadavpur
- Dr. R. Ahmed Dental College and Hospital, Sealdah
- Guru Nanak Institute of Dental Science and Research, Panihati
- College of Medicine & JNM Hospital, Kalyani
