= Prince Anwar Shah Road =

Road in Kolkata, India

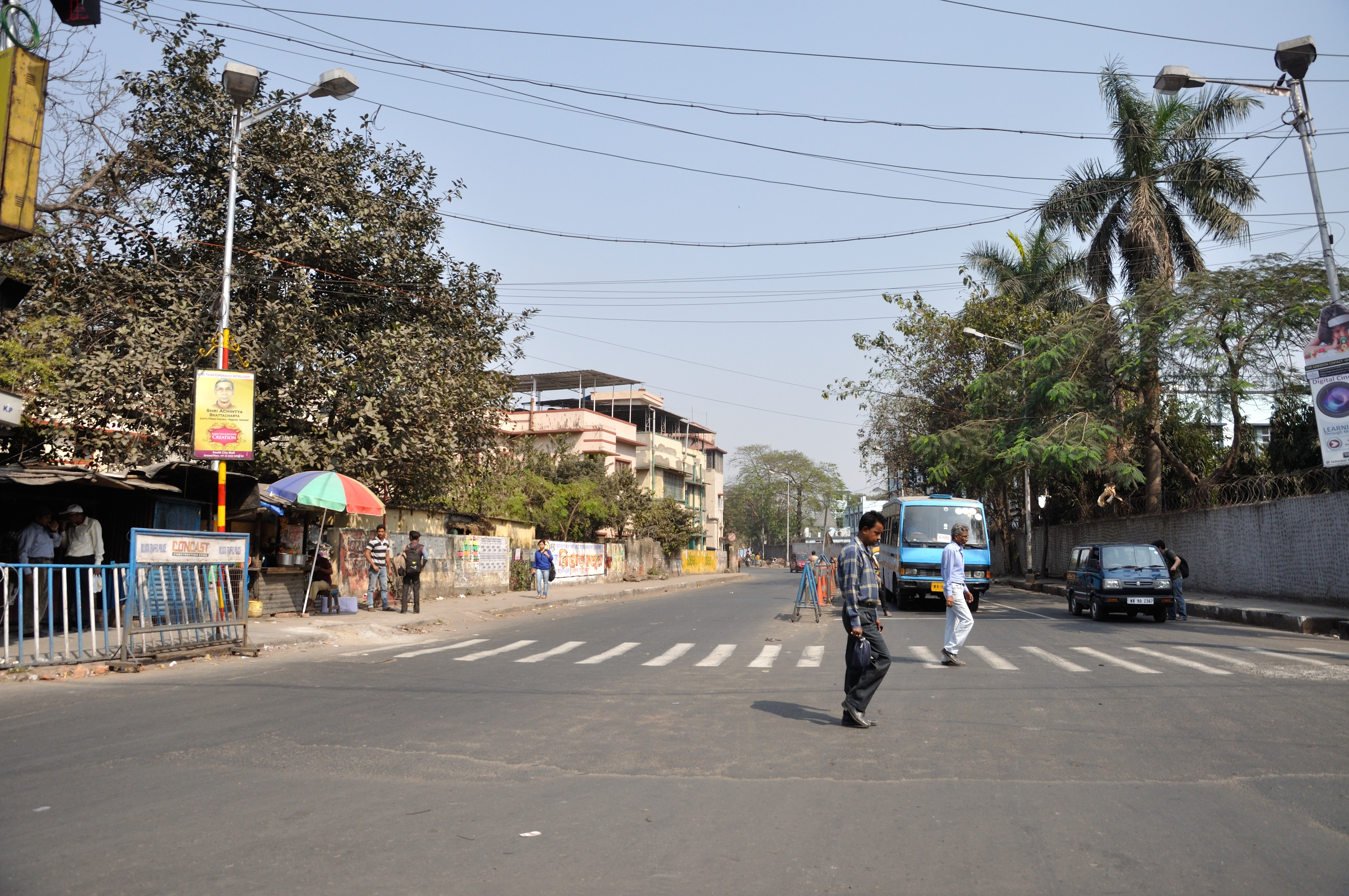
- Junction of Prince Anwar Shah Road and Raja SC Mullick Road, Jadavpur Police Station
- Maintained by: Kolkata Municipal Corporation
- Location: Kolkata, India
- Nearest Kolkata Metro station: Rabindra Sarobar, Mahanayak Uttam Kumar and Kavi Sukanta
- West end: Tollygunge
- East end: Jadavpur, with an extension to Avishikta

Prince Anwar Shah Road is a four-lane major arterial road in South Kolkata, India. It is named after Prince Ghulam Mohammed Anwar Ali Shah, one of Tipu Sultan's 12 sons.

== Route ==
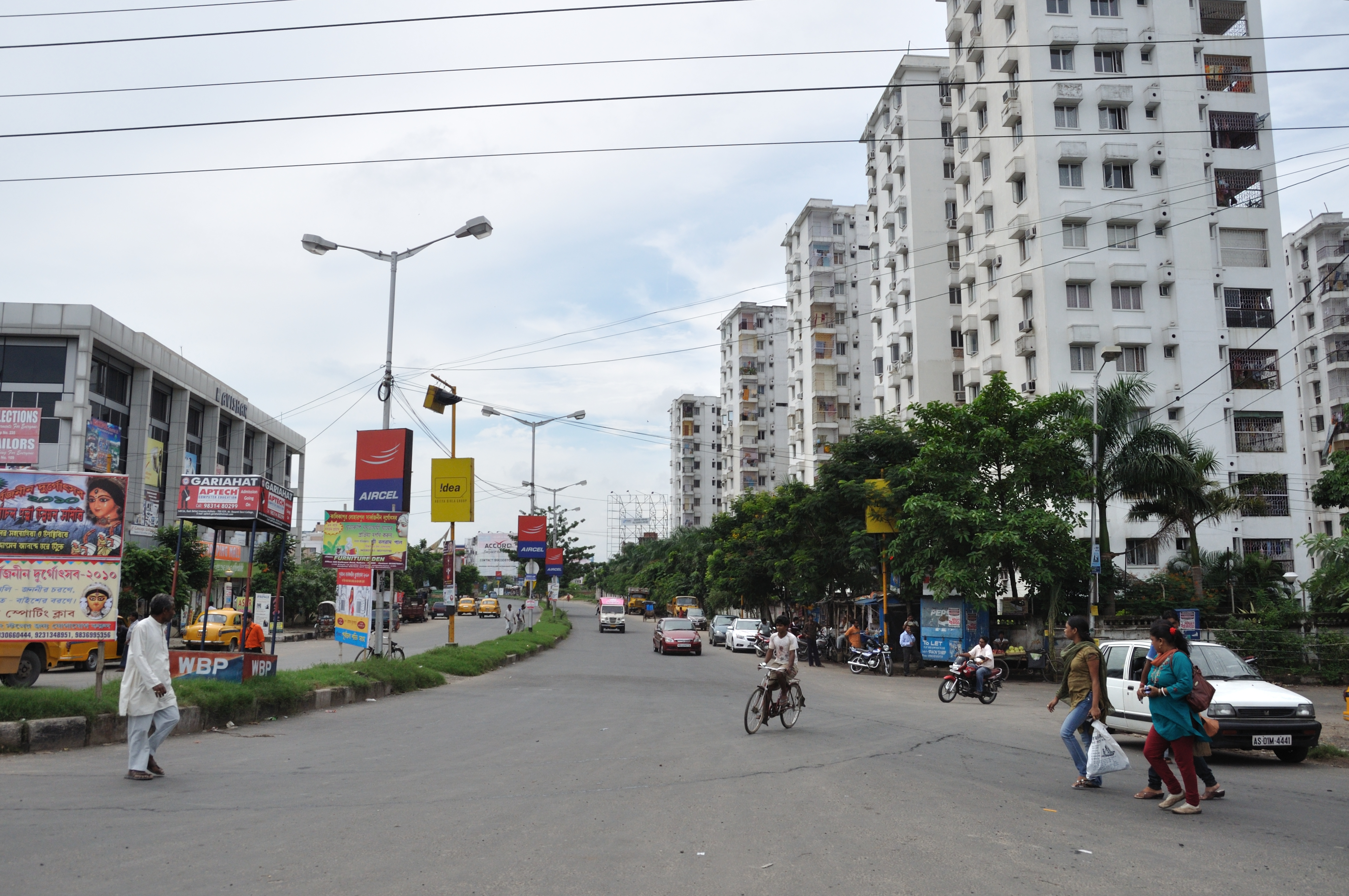
Prince Anwar Shah Road connection via Kalikapur Road to the Eastern Metropolitan Bypass.

The road is one of major east-west arterial connections in the city. It starts at the Raja SC Mullick Road, near the Jadavpur Police Station, and connects to Tollygunge in the west. It runs through neighborhoods including Jodhpur Park, Lake Gardens, and Tollygunge.

The continuation Kalikapur Road to the Eastern Metropolitan Bypass was opened to the public on 1 March 2007. Prince Anwar Shah Road is connected to Kalikapur Road via Jibanananda Setu (Selimpur Rail Overbridge).

The four-lane road is parallel to Rashbehari Avenue. This has improved access to the EM Bypass for the residents of Shahidnagar, Viveknagar, Selimpur, and other neighbourhoods.

== Localities ==
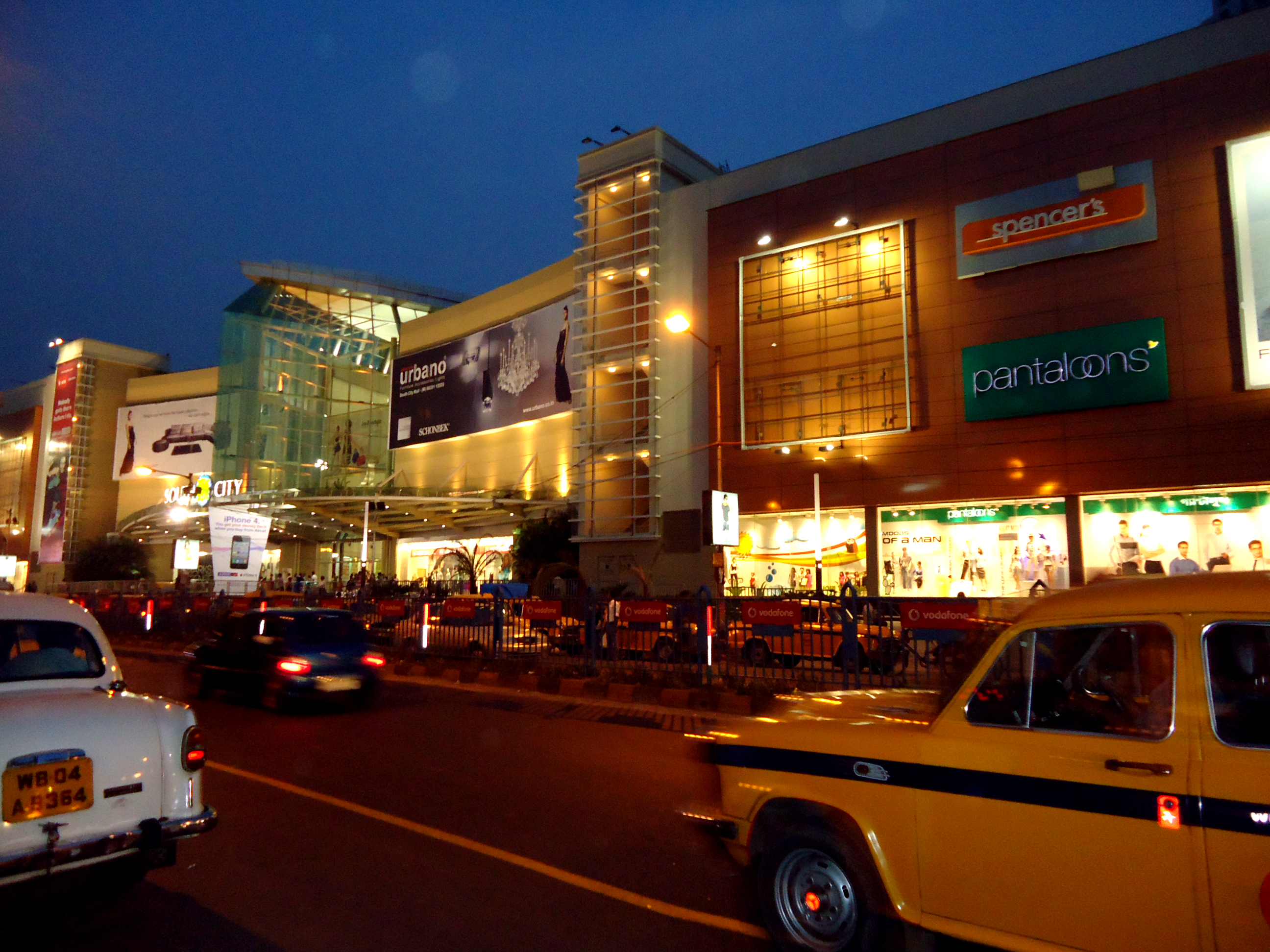
South City Mall at night

The South City Mall on Prince Anwar Shah Road opened its shop floor in early July 2007.

The South City mini-township is located on a 31.14-acre (126,000 m^{2}) site on Prince Anwar Shah Road, just opposite Jodhpur Park.
