= KPC Medical College and Hospital =

Private college in Jadavpur, India

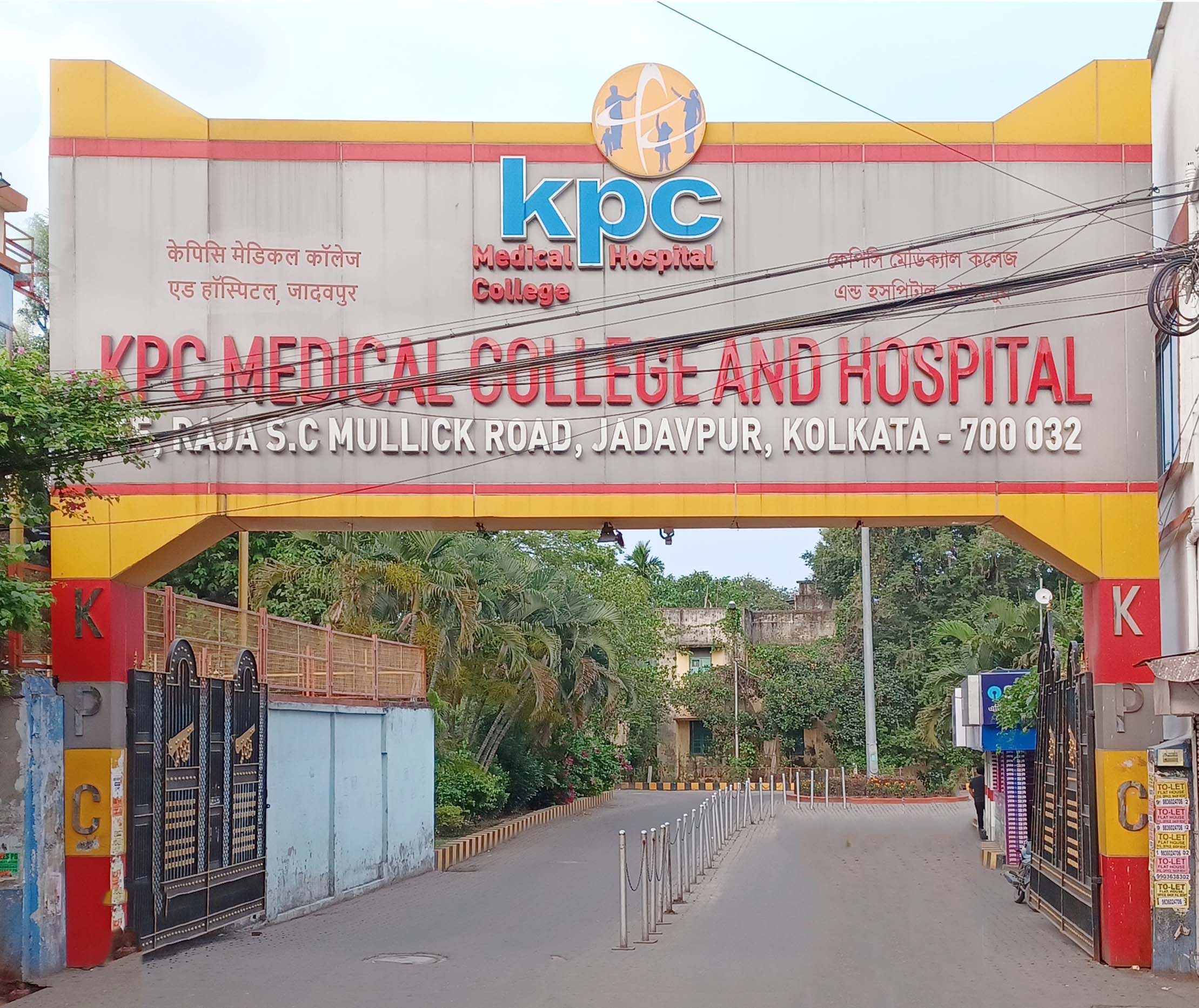
- Type: Private Medical college & Hospital
- Established: 2006; 20 years ago
- Affiliations: WBUHS, NMC
- Chairman: Dr. Kali Pradip Chaudhuri
- Principal: Dr. Kunal Kanti Majumdar
- Location: Kolkata, West Bengal, India; 22.493248°N 88.373144°E
- Website: www.kpcmedicalcollege.in

KPC Medical College and Hospital is a private medical college situated in Jadavpur, Kolkata, West Bengal, India. It is affiliated to the West Bengal University of Health Sciences. It is the first private medical college in West Bengal.

== History ==
KPC Medical College and Hospital was the first private-public-partnership (PPP) model medical college of West Bengal. Now it is completely Private Medical College not under PPP Model run by KPC Group. It was founded by Dr. Kali Pradip Chaudhuri, in the premises of Dr. K. S. Ray TB Hospital, founded by Dr. K. P. Chaudhuri himself.

In January 2002, a memorandum of understanding was signed between the Government of West Bengal and a private sector for setting up the college.

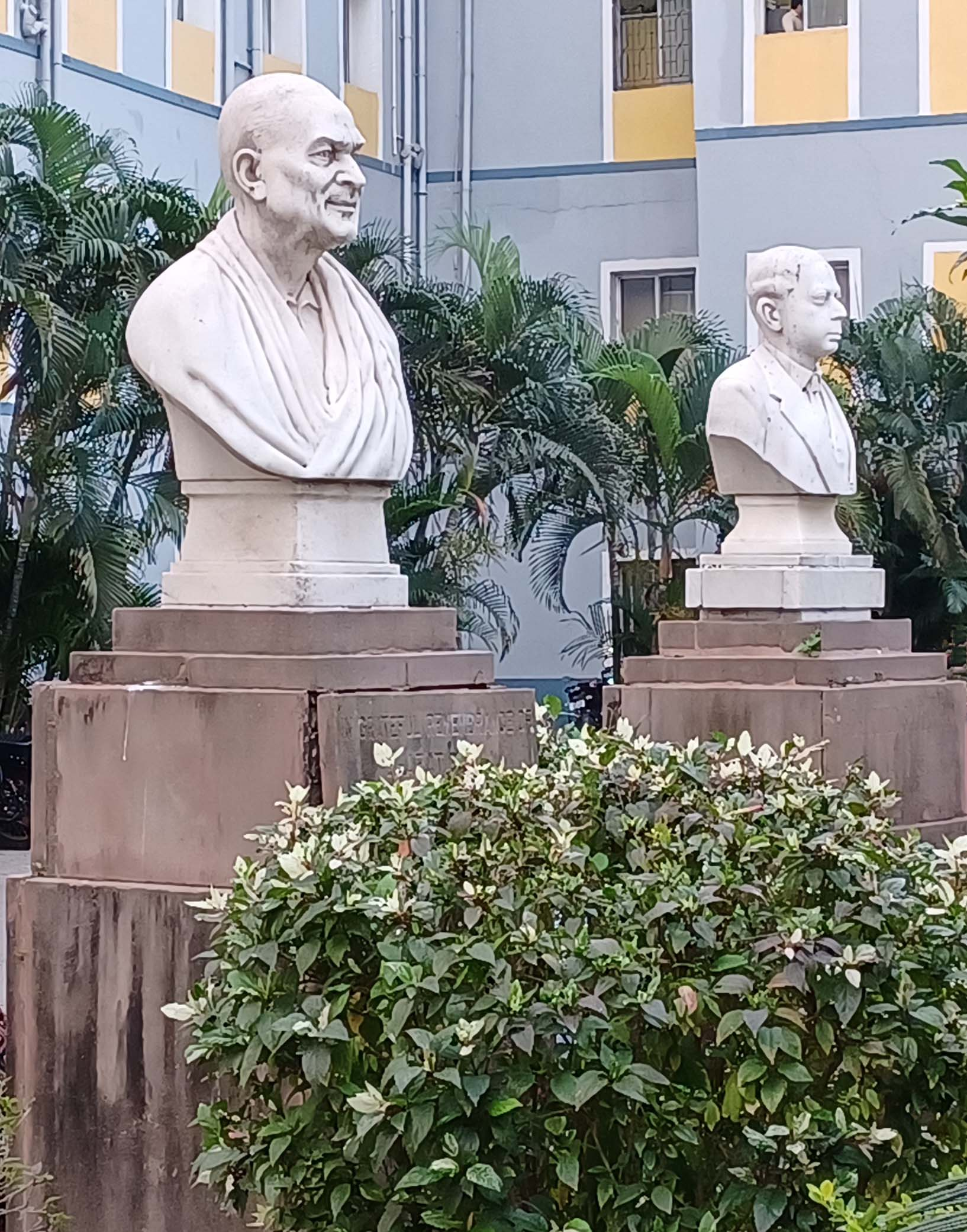
Portrait sculpture of Dr. Kali Pradip Chaudhuri and Dr. K. S. Ray (Founders of this Hospital) for a tribute to them

== Campus ==
- KPC Hospital Building
- K.P.M. Ward
- Sarada Building
- N.R.S. and P.C.R. Ward
- Lady Narayani Ward
- New P.W.D. building
- Sukanta Library
- KPC Medical College building
- Boys' and Girls' separate Hostels

== Organisation and administration ==
=== Governance ===
The college and hospital are funded and managed by KPC Charitable Trust and Government of West Bengal.

=== Departments ===
The departments in KPC Medical College are as follows:

- Department of Anesthesiology
- Department of Anatomy
- Department of Biochemistry
- Department of Clinical Dietetics & Community Nutrition
- Department of Community Medicine
- Department of Dentistry
- Department of Dermatology, Leprosy and Venereal Diseases
- Department of ENT (Otorhinolaryngology)
- Department of General Medicine
- Department of General Surgery
- Department of Obstetrics & Gynecology
- Department of Ophthalmology
- Department of Orthopaedics
- Department of Paediatrics
- Department of Radiology
- Department of Pulmonary Medicine
- Department of Microbiology
- Department of Pathology
- Department of Pharmacology
- Department of Physiology
- Department of Psychiatry
- Department of Forensic Medicine
- Department of Bachelor of Medical Laboratory Technology

== Academics ==
=== Admission ===
Admission to this college is by the National Eligibility cum Entrance Test–UG (NEET-UG) for 50 government quota seats and 77 odd management quota seats, all through central counselling. There is provision for NRI admissions as well for 23 odd seats, with the total strength adding up to 150. The college is affiliated to West Bengal University of Health Sciences of the Government of West Bengal. and recognised by National Medical Commission.
