= Jadavpur =

- Neighbourhood in Kolkata (Calcutta)
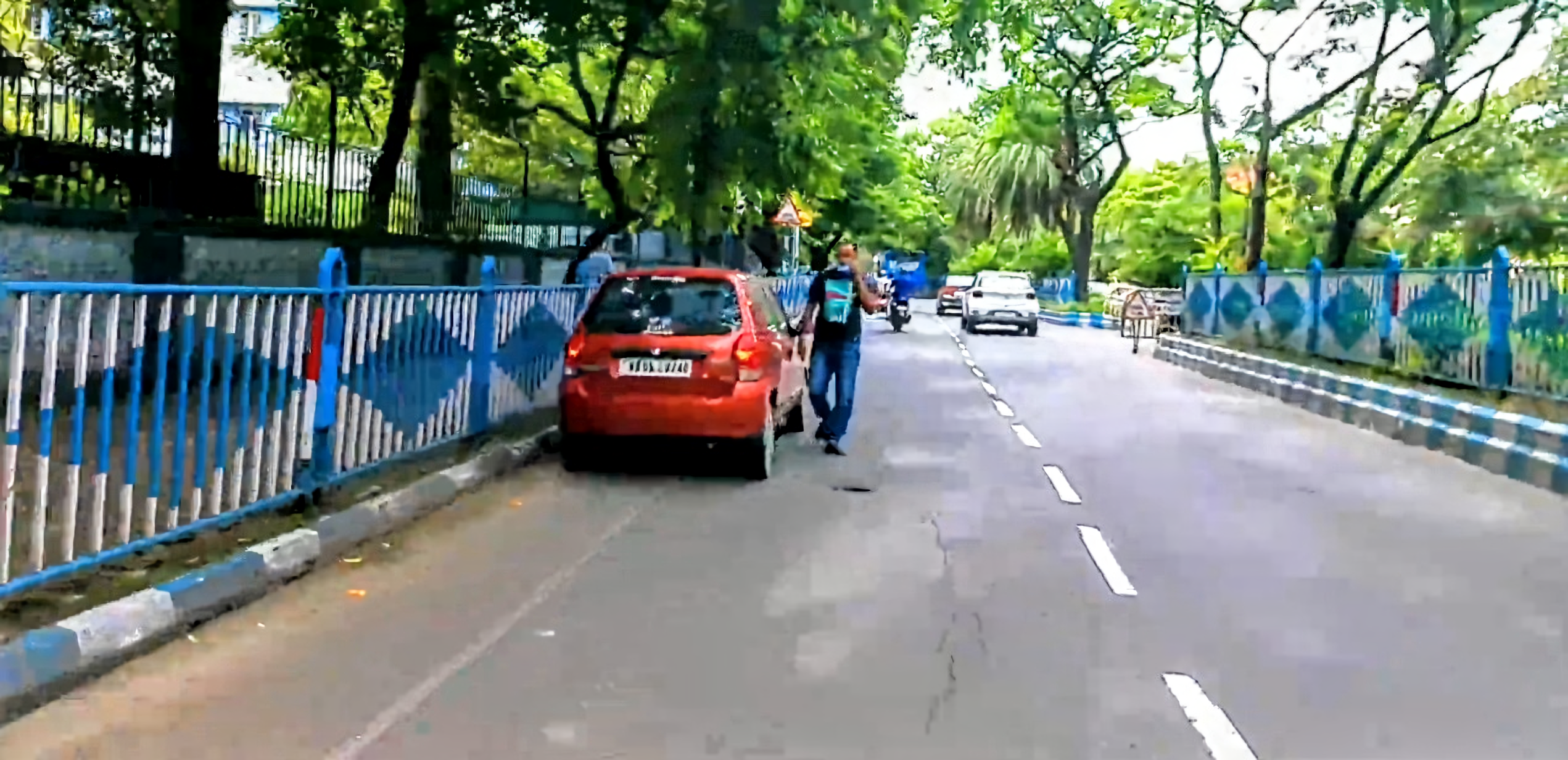
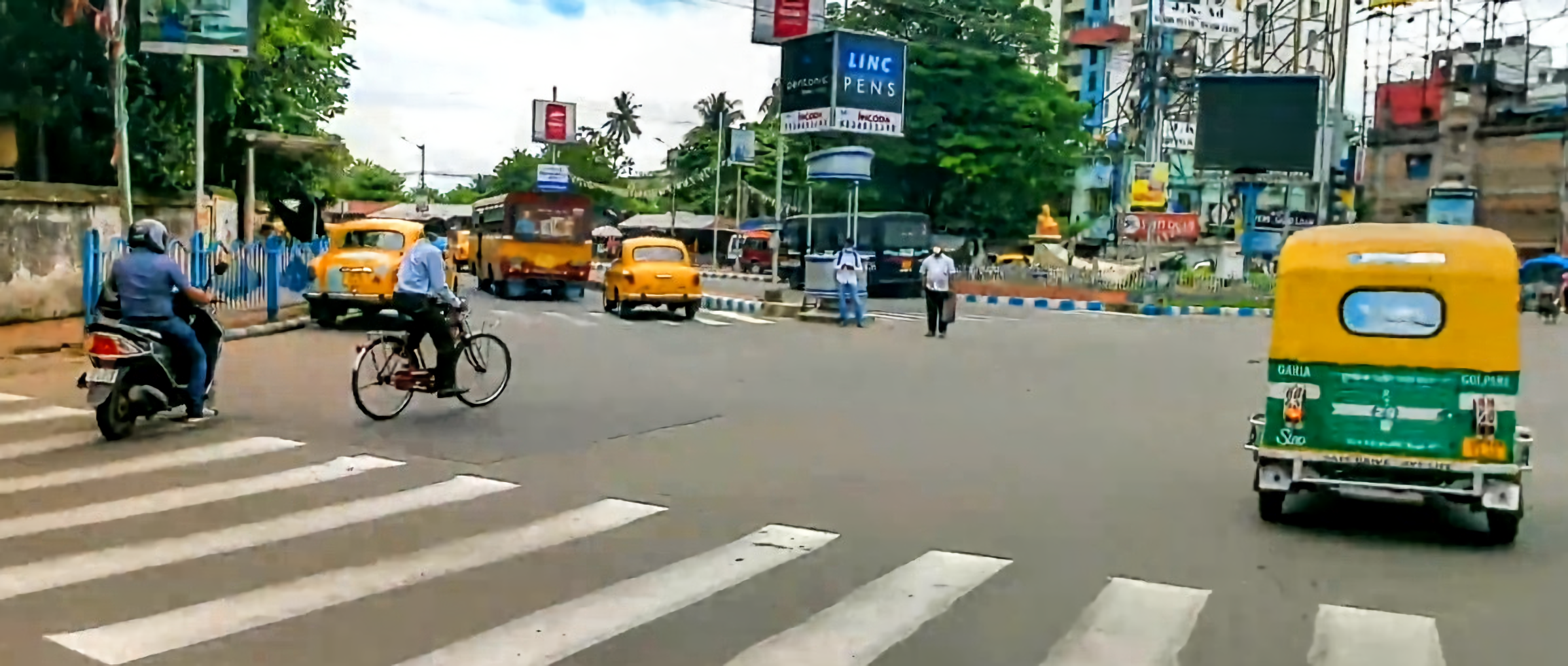
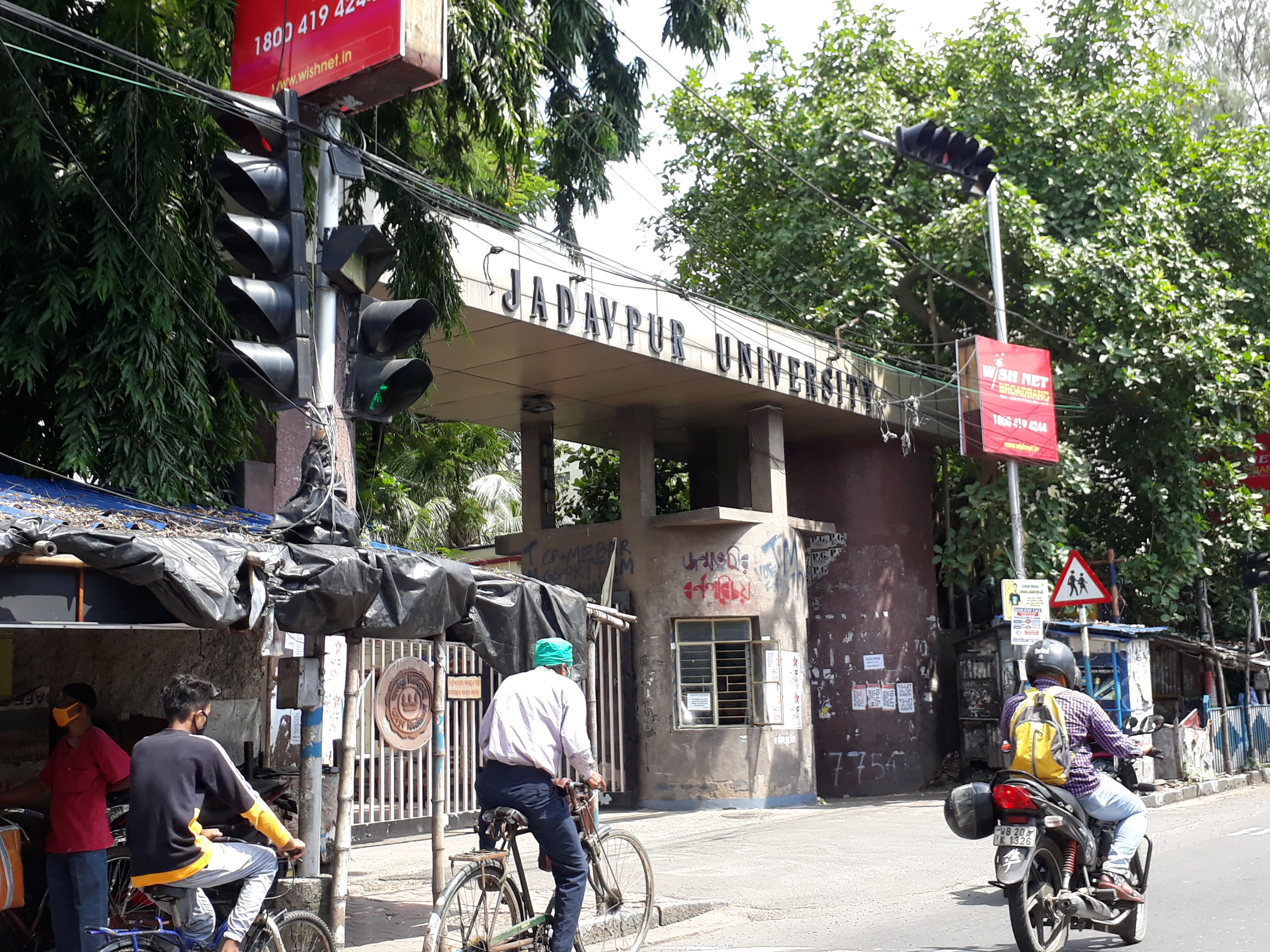
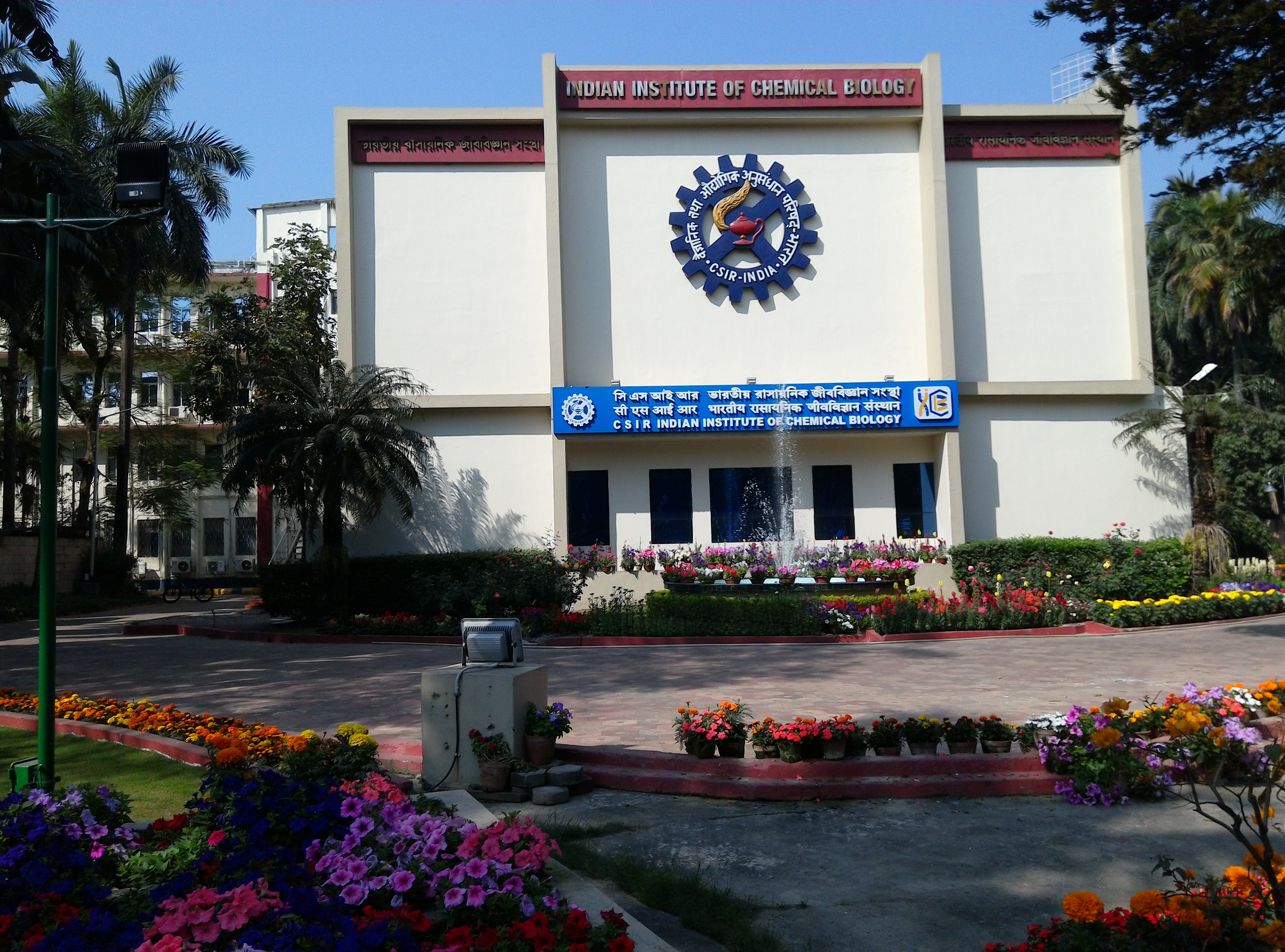
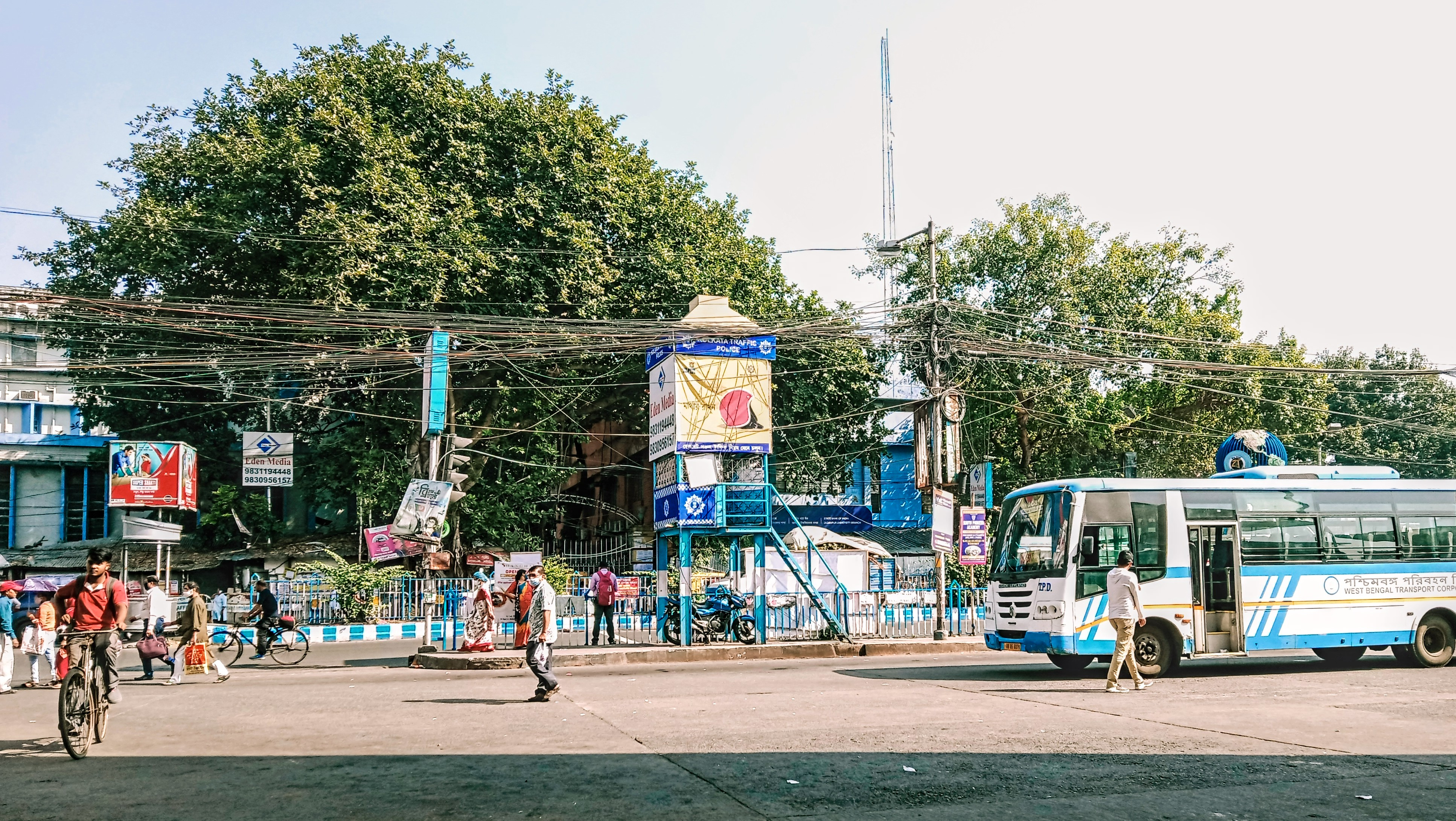
- 1:Raja S.C Mullick Road 2:Sulekha More 3: Jadavpur University 4no.Gate 4:Indian Institute of Chemical Biology 5:8B Bus Stand

- Location of Jadavpur Jadavpur (West Bengal) Jadavpur (India)
- Coordinates: 22.502513°N 88.3676051°E
- Country: India
- State: West Bengal
- City: Kolkata
- District: Kolkata
- Metro Station: Rabindra Sarobar; Mahanayak Uttam Kumar; Kavi Sukanta; Jyotirindra Nandi; Satyajit Ray
- Municipal Corporation: Kolkata Municipal Corporation
- KMC wards: 92, 93, 96, 98, 99, 102
- Elevation: 36 ft (11 m)

Languages
  - Official: Bengali
  - Additional official: English
- Time zone: UTC+5:30 (IST)
- PIN: 700 032, 700 092
- Area code: +91 33
- Lok Sabha constituency: Jadavpur
- Vidhan Sabha constituency: Jadavpur

Jadavpur is a neighbourhood of Southern Kolkata in Kolkata district in West Bengal, India. It is one of the important junctions in South Kolkata. Jadavpur University and a number of research institutes of national and international importance are located here.

== Etymology ==
Jadavpur was named after Late Jadav Narayan Sarkar, zamindar of Sonarpur.

== History ==
In 1862, "the Calcutta and South-Eastern Railway opened a line south-ward from what was then called Beliaghata Station to Port Canning." The line (now part of Sealdah South lines) passes through Jadavpur.

In 1876, Dr. Mahendra Lal Sarkar, established the Indian Association for the Cultivation of Science, an institution for fundamental research in basic sciences, at Jadavpur, as an entirely private effort. Sir C. V. Raman carried out ground-breaking work in the field of light scattering in this institute and it was first published by the institute in the Indian Journal of Physics. It earned him the 1930 Nobel Prize for Physics.

With donations from Raja Subodh Chandra Mullick, Brajendra Kishore Roychowdhury and others, the National Council of Education, set up the institutions at Jadavpur, in 1906, as a Swadeshi effort for the promotion of science and technology. The Bengal Technical Institute was "initially set up at Maniktala but soon moved to what was then the quiet suburban retreat of Jadavpur. Later, this became the College of Engineering and Technology, and finally in 1955, Jadavpur University. The progress of Jadavpur University from a technical institute to a diversified university with flourishing arts and science faculties, including several centres for advanced work in various areas, is perhaps the most significant and heartening development in Kolkata’s academic life since independence."

Jadavpur is home to two research institutes, under the Council of Scientific & Industrial Research – the Indian Institute of Chemical Biology, established in 1935, and the Central Glass and Ceramic Research Institute, established in 1950.

The Calcutta Municipal Corporation Act 1980, which came into effect in 1984, extended the boundaries of Kolkata by including South Suburban, Garden Reach and Jadavpur municipalities in Kolkata.

With the partition of Bengal in 1947, "millions of refugees poured in from erstwhile East Pakistan." In the initial stages bulk of the refugees were non-agriculturists. A few of them made their own arrangements, but "it was squatters who made the East Bengali refugees famous or infamous." Squatting (jabardakhal in Bengali) ranged from the forcible occupation of barracks to the collective take-over of private, government and waste land. "This happened as early as 1948 with middle class refugees in the Jadabpur area: first on government land and then on private property, leading to violent clashes. Having won the battle, the elated squatters named their colony ‘Bijaygarh’, the Fort of Victory." By 1949, there were 40 such colonies in Jadavpur, Kasba, Santoshpur, Garia and Behala, in the south-eastern part of the city, and 65 in the Dum Dum and Panihati zone in the north. Subsequently squatters colonies also came up along the west bank of the Hooghly and by 1950, there were 150 such colonies. "Their names – Surya Sen Nagar, Bapujinagar, Bidhanpally, Adarshanagar – reflected their creators’ memories of the past and hopes for the future." The squatters resorted to various strategies to gain legitimacy and government aid. A common practice was to invite leading personalities of Calcutta society to be the president of their refugee association. At one point of time Basanti Devi, then widow of Deshbandhu Chittaranjan Das, was president of the Jadavpur Refugee Camp Association for a short period. The efforts of the East Bengali refugees in rebuilding their lives, virtually with their own efforts, has been spoken of as "self-rehabilitation". To take just one example of their success: by 1952, Bijaygarh boasted of four schools, one college, a market, a post office, a temple and even a hospital. No doubt, Bijaygarh was a model for others to follow. Efforts have been made in more recent years to regularise land/property rights in the refugee colonies.

== Geography ==
=== Police district ===
Jadavpur police station is in the South Suburban division of Kolkata Police. It is located at 1, Raja Subodh Chandra Mallick Road, Kolkata-700032.

See also - Purba Jadavpur police station

Patuli Women police station has jurisdiction over all police districts under the jurisdiction of South Suburban Division i.e. Netaji Nagar, Jadavpur, Kasba, Regent Park, Bansdroni, Garfa and Patuli.

Jadavpur, Thakurpukur, Behala, Purba Jadavpur, Tiljala, Regent Park, Metiabruz, Nadial and Kasba police stations were transferred from South 24 Parganas to Kolkata in 2011. Except Metiabruz, all the police stations were split into two. The new police stations are Parnasree, Haridevpur, Garfa, Patuli, Survey Park, Pragati Maidan, Bansdroni and Rajabagan.

=== Location ===
Jadavpur is located at 22.502513°N 88.3676051°E. It is bounded by Jodhpur Park and Dhakuria to the north, Tollygunge and Golf Green to the west, Santoshpur and Garfa to the east and Baghajatin and Garia to the south.

The Jadavpur market area is often casually referred to as the "8B" area, due to the sprawling 8B bus terminus that dominates the major crossing of the area. It is the centre of Jadavpur downtown, right across from Jadavpur University and a few hundred yards from KPC Medical College and Hospital and K.S. Roy T.B. Hospital.

=== Climate ===
Jadavpur has tropical climate much like Kolkata though the rainfall is heavier as the southern parts gets higher rainfall than the main city. The area gets flooded during the heavy monsoonal rain from June to October. The average maximum temperature is around 35 degree Celsius and average minimum temperature is around 25 degree Celsius. Annual rainfall is about 1900 mm.

== Economy ==
=== Industry ===
- Bengal Lamp was set up in 1913. Tapan Kumar Roy and Tapash Kumar Roy were the joint managing directors. It used to produce fluorescent lights, tube lights and filament bulbs. The factory was locked out in 1989 and referred to the Bureau of Industrial and Financial Restructuring in 1990. “Initially, Bengal Lamp’s shut-down figured prominently in political discourse… but that has petered out..Bengal Lamp has faded from public memory.” There were 480 workers at the time of lock-out.
- Sulekha Ink entered the fountain pen ink market as an alternative to imported brands and became a preferred choice throughout the country. Christened by Rabindra Nath Tagore, the company was owned by Kalyan Moitra. The company dropped its shutters in 1989. In 2005, the company sold its ‘excess’ land at Jadavpur and reorganised its factory. Two housing projects, Devaloke Heights and Devaloke Fort, and a jewellery shop of Senco Gold, has come up on Sulekha's land.
- National Instruments Limited, a Government of India Undertaking, used to produce gauges & indicators, thermometers, surveying instruments, optical instruments and possibly was the only Indian manufacturer of mass-produced cameras (National 35 model). As it became sick, it was closed down and transferred to Jadavpur University in 2009.
- Annapurna Glass Works
- Krishna Glass Works

=== Markets ===
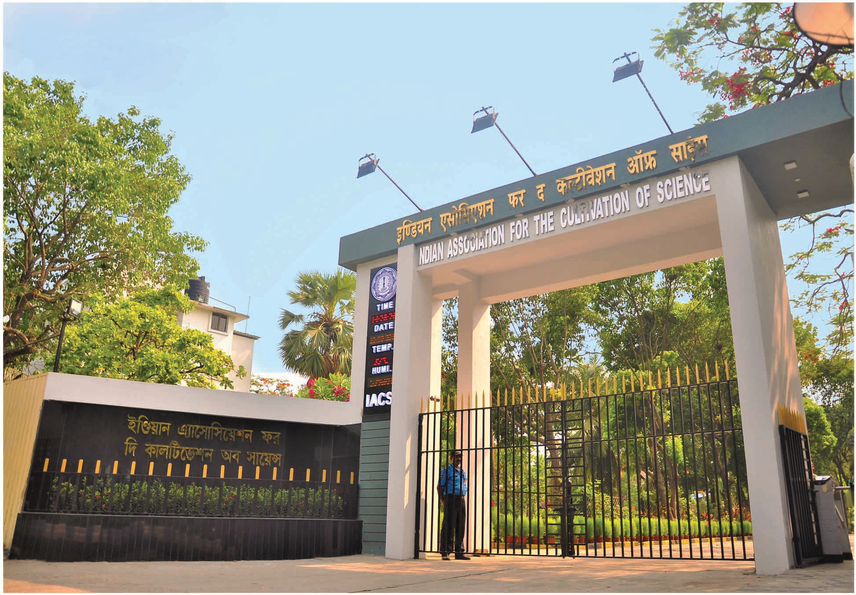
Indian Association for the Cultivation of Science (IACS)

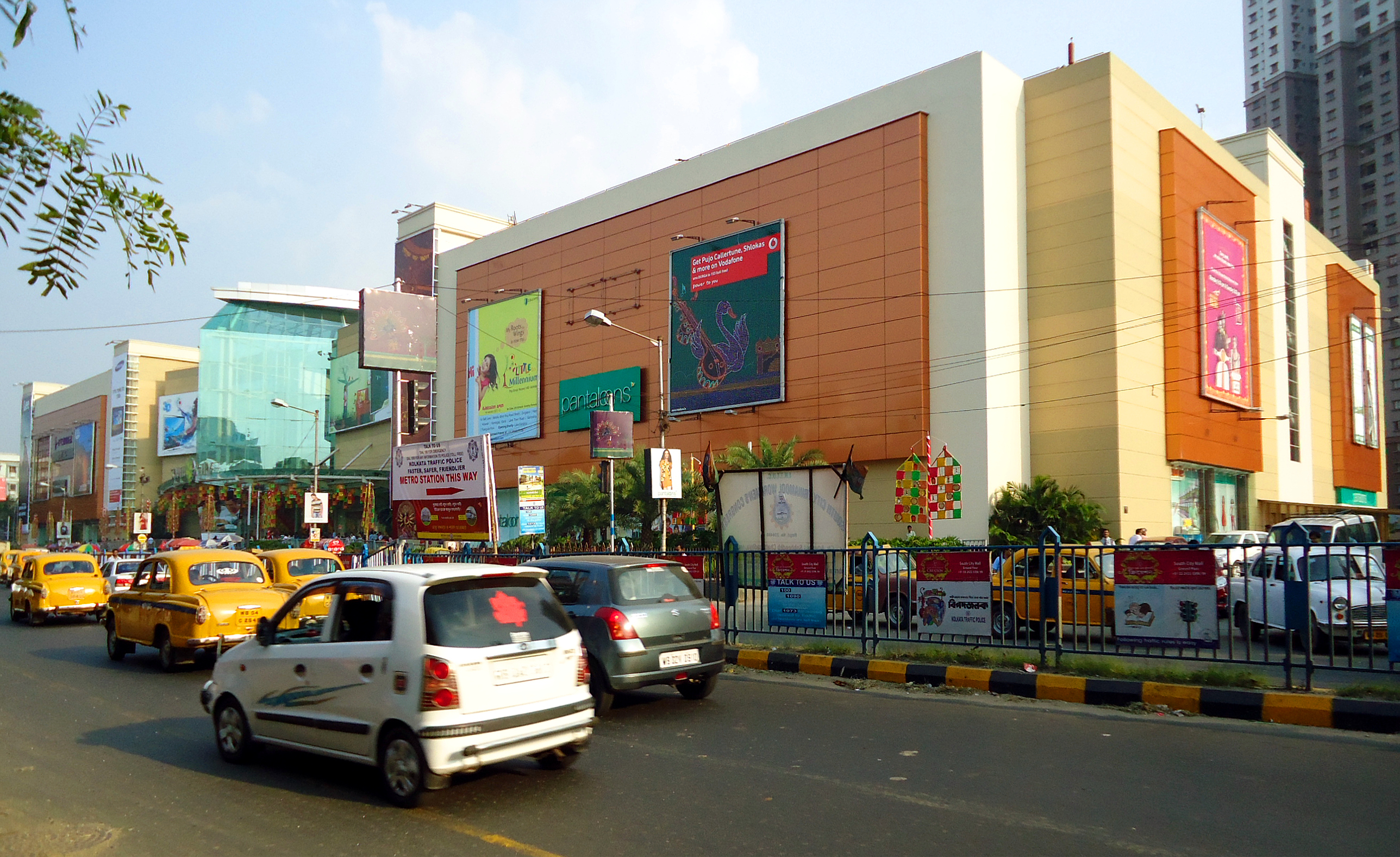
South City Mall

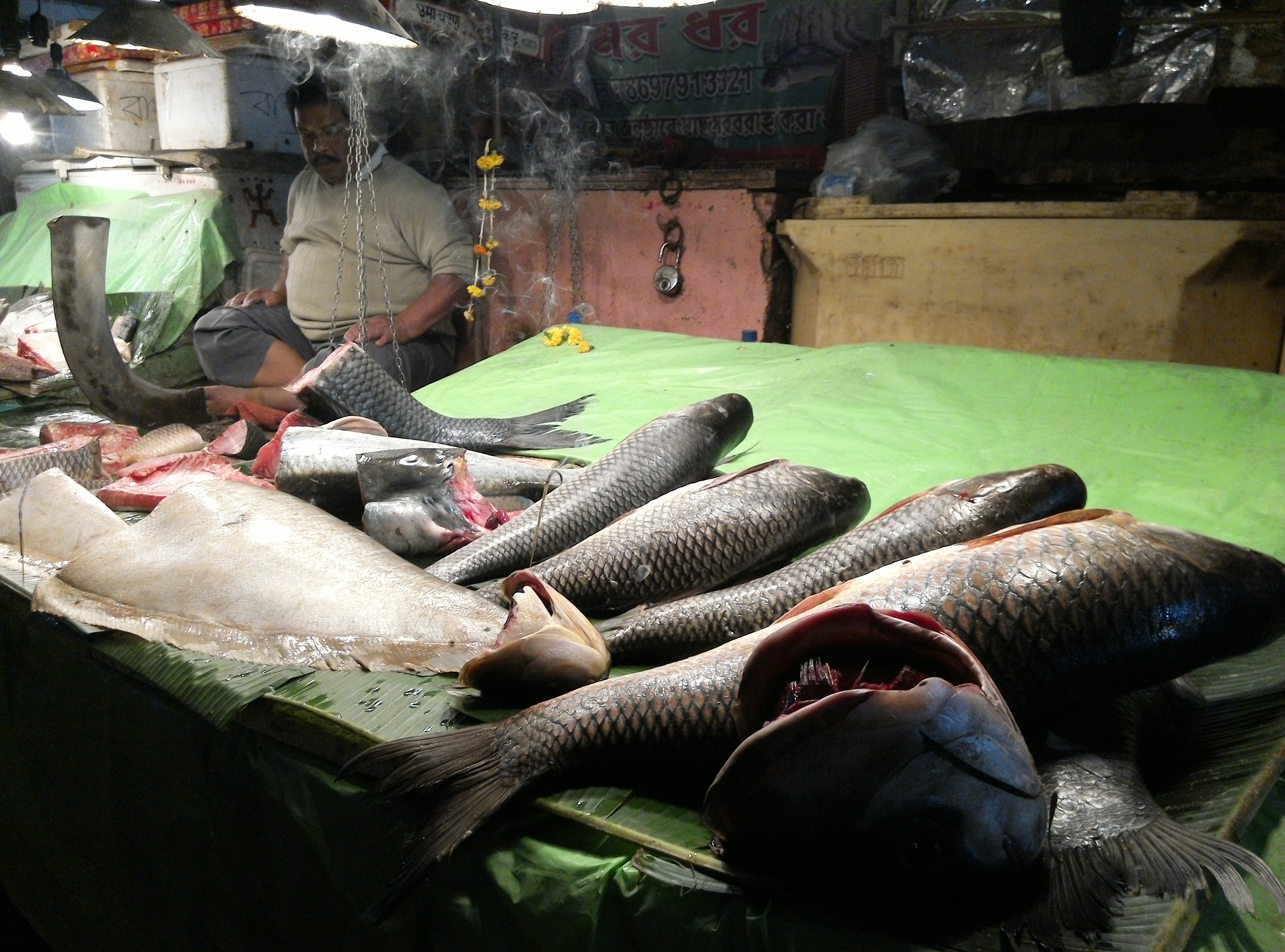
Fish vendor in Jadavpur market

The Jadavpur 8B area has recently become a very popular shopping destination, having shops of almost every need. Since Bengali cuisine is almost synonymous with fish, the Jadavpur market is a major place where you will get a wide variety of fishes, specially Ilish mach (Hilsa fish), Pabda and the ever present Ruhi. Also available are sea water fishes like Pomfret and Mackerel. Vendors also offer chickens and geese; those chosen are slaughtered on the spot and usually carried home on rickshaws. It boasts of a large farmer's market, serviced by the rail line. Sukanta setu market is another busy situated in this area. It is mainly starts in morning and closes within couple of hours. The morning rush of vendors and buyers often creates traffic jam in this area.

South City Mall, the biggest shopping mall in eastern India, has been opened at Prince Anwar Shah Road since 2008. It has added some more value to the residents of this region.

== Transport ==
Jadavpur has a bus terminal named Jadavpur 8B Bus Terminus. A variety of AC & Non-AC Buses depart from this terminus. It is also the hub of the famous bus named E1 which is the fastest executive bus of Kolkata connecting Howrah Station with Jadavpur.

Some Other WBTC Buses are given below -

AC1 & E1 - Jadavpur - Howrah Station

S9 & AC9 - Jadavpur - Saltlake Karunamoyee via Santoshpur EM Byepass

AC9B - Jadavpur - Ecospace via Santoshpur EM Byepass Sector 5 Newtown

S31 & AC31 - Jadavpur - Behala via Jadavpur ps Lake Gardens Anwarsaha road Tollygung Metro J L Sarani

S8B - Jadavpur - Howrah

S8B/N - Jadavpur - Nabanna

AC43 - Golf Green - Airport Terminal via Santoshpur EM Byepass Sector5 Newtown Eco Park Kaikhali

S5A - Jadavpur - Howrah Stn

AC50B - Jadavpur - Belur Math (occasional purposes)

D27A - Habra -Ashonagar - Jadavpur via Santoshpur EM Byepass Sector5 Newtown Eco Park Kaikhali Airport(all gates) Birati BT College Doltala New Barrackpore Hridaipur Madhyamgram Barasat ...........

Jadavpur railway station is one of the busiest railway station of Sealdah South section on the Sealdah–Diamond Harbour line. This railway station is under the jurisdiction of Eastern Railway, Sealdah railway division. There are only 2 Platforms here All Sealdah bound trains arrive & depart from Platform No.1 & all Sonarpur bound trains arrive & leave from Platform No.2.

All Galloping Local Trains gives a stop here except First Down Train 34812.

== Education and research ==
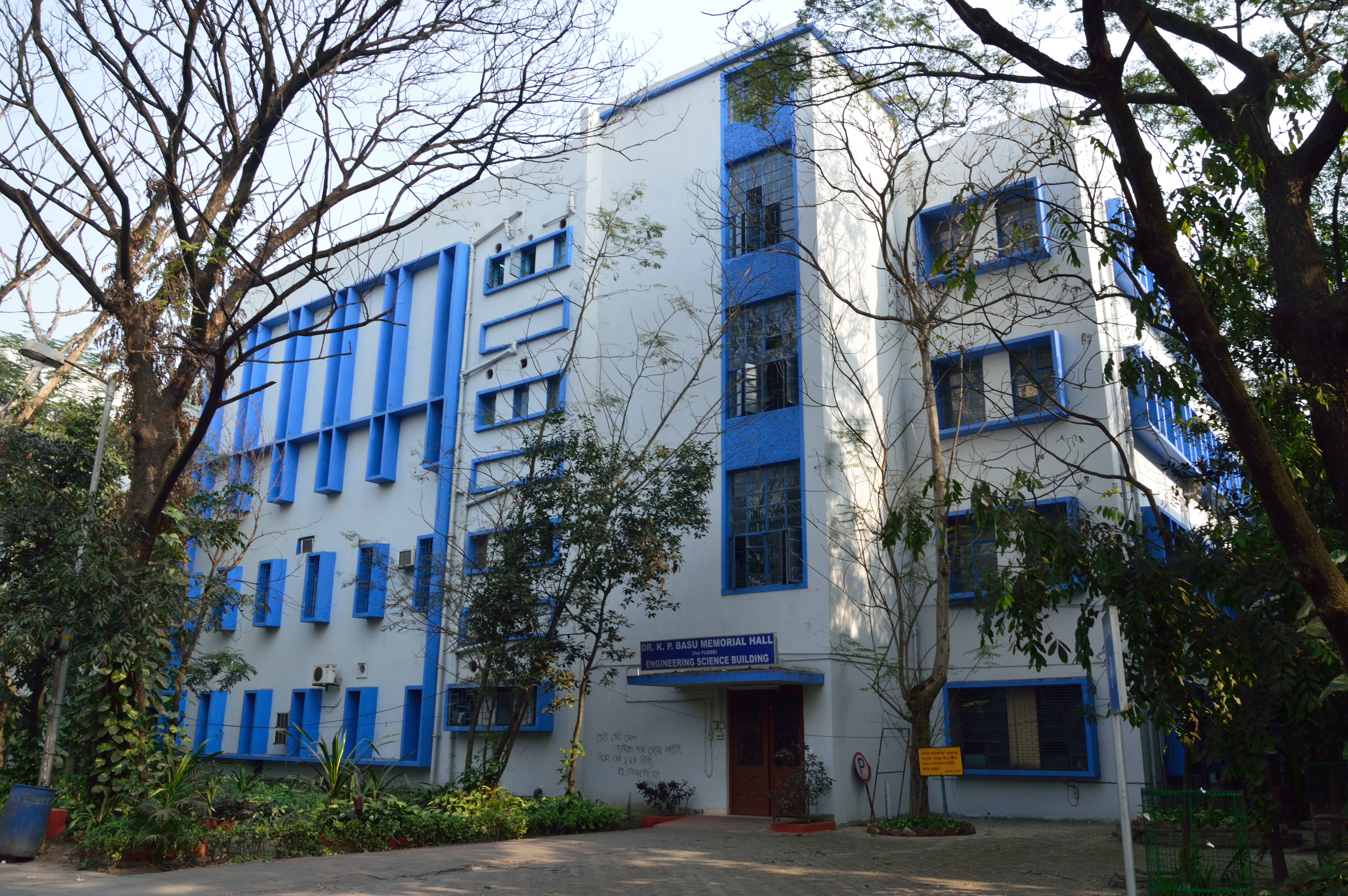
Engineering Science Building, Jadavpur University

- Jadavpur University is a public state university formerly known as Bengal Technical Institute established by National Council of Education - Bengal in 1906. As per the report of the International Comparative Performance of India's Research Base it has been ranked within the top ten Indian Research Institutions. It has over 11,000 students. It offers undergraduate, post graduate and research courses in arts, science, engineering, pharmacy, education etc. It is made up of 36 departments, with 21 interdisciplinary schools, and 40 centres of study.
- Vijaygarh Jyotish Ray College was established in 1950 and is affiliated with the University of Calcutta. It offers honours courses in Bengali, English, education, political science, history, philosophy, physics, chemistry, botany, zoology, microbiology, economics and accounting & finance. It also offers post-graduation in microbiology. The college owes its origin to the initiative of the inhabitants of the Refugee Colony. Uttama Sundari Dutta, the mother-in-law of late Jyotish Chandra Ray, after whom the college has been named, made a gift of Rs. 20,000 for the establishment of the college.
- Indian Association for the Cultivation of Science, is a public deemed to be central university and the oldest scientific research institution in Asia, funded by the Department of Science and Technology, Government of India, and Government of West Bengal. It offers undergraduate, post-graduate courses in basic sciences, and doctoral and post-doctoral facilities. Sir C.V.Raman's work was carried forward at IACS, by Sir K.S.Krishnan and Kedareswar Banerjee.
- Indian Institute of Chemical Biology was initially established as the first non-official centre to carry out basic biomedical research and was taken over by CSIR in 1956. Amongst its achievements are the development of an oral vaccine for cholera, herbal products for controlling gastric ulcer, empirical treatment for vitiligo, diagnostic kits for malignancy and hormonal disorders, fungal enzymes of industrial importance, radiopharmaceuticals for evaluation of the functional status of renal and hepatobiliary systems and a device for early detection of Parkinson's disease.
- Central Glass and Ceramic Research Institute, was set up initially as Central Glass and Silicate Research Institute and was one of the earliest research institutes to be set up by CSIR in the country. The development of various types of optical glasses, in the fifties, brought CGCRI into limelight in the international arena. It was followed by development of laser glass, infra-red transmitting filters, synthetic quartz single crystal, high temperature protective enamels, high alumina ceramic seals and spacers, work in the field of optical fibre for telecommunications, sol-gel processing of glass and ceramic materials, production of glass fibre-based composites and application of ceramic materials in electronics.
- KPC Medical College and Hospital, a private medical college, established in 2006, has 150 seats (as of 2018) in the MBBS course. MCI has approved MD and MS courses. Shova Rani Nursing College offers B.Sc. (Hons.) Nursing and GNM Nursing courses.
- Acharya Prafulla Chandra Ray Polytechnic offers diploma level courses in engineering.
- Jadavpur Vidyapith, a Bengali-medium co-educational higher secondary school, was established within the Jadavpur University campus, in 1957. The school has around 1,500 students. It has produced many brilliant students; some of them have also been rank holders in Madhyamik Pariksha conducted by West Bengal Board of Secondary Education.
- The Calcutta Emmanuel School, a English-medium co-ed school affiliated to the Council for the Indian School Certificate Examinations (CISCE), was established in 1989 by Rev. Vijayan Pavamani for providing education to the poorest sections of the society. There are classes from Nursery to Class XII, having three streams of study (Humanities, Science, Commerce) at the ISC level.
- Jadavpur High School, a Bengali-medium boys only higher secondary school, located in KMC Ward No. 96, was established in 1935. The school has arrangements for teaching in classes VI to XII.
- Jadavpur Girls High School, a Bengali-medium girls only higher secondary school, located in KMC Ward No. 93, was established in 1948. The school has arrangements for teaching in classes VI to XII.
- Jadavpur Baghajatin High School, a Bengali-medium boys only higher secondary school, located in KMC Ward No. 99, was established in 1950. The school has arrangements for teaching in classes VI to XII.
- Jadavpur Nabakrishna Pal Adarsha Shikshayatan, secondary and higher secondary boys' school located in Vivek Nagar neighbourhood
- Baghajatin Balika Vidyalaya, a Bengali-medium girls only higher secondary school located in KMC Ward No. 99, was established in 1956. The school has arrangements for teaching in classes VI to XII.
- Katjunagar Swarnamayee Vidyapith, a Bengali-medium co-educational higher secondary school located in KMC ward no. 93, was established in 1966. The school has arrangements for teaching in classes VI to XII.
- Bani Bhaban High School, a Bengali-medium boys only higher secondary school located in KMC ward no. 99, was established in 1958. The school has arrangements for teaching in classes VI to XII
- Anthelion School of Art, an ISO 9001:2015 Certified, complete ecosystem for Art, working globally - Art School (Art Classes), Art Workshops, Exhibitions, Online Gallery, Art Camps and many more. www.anthelionartschool.com

== Culture ==
On the cultural front, Jadavpur hosts one of the major Kali Pujas in Kolkata, called Nava-Kali (nine different forms of Goddess Kali).

== Healthcare ==
- K.S. Ray TB Hospital (earlier known as Jadavpur TB Hospital), was set up by Dr. Kumud Sankar Ray (1892–1950), at Jadavpur in 1922, with Rs. 1.6 lakhs left over for the purpose by Prabhas Chandra Ghose, a tuberculosis patient abandoned by his family. In those days tuberculosis was a highly infectious killer disease. Dr. K.S.Ray, one of the earliest TB researchers in this country, set up a small four-bed unit, the first of its kind in Bengal. In the earlier days of acute financial crisis, Surama Devi, his wife, largely did the cooking and cared for the patients. The doctor was ridiculed and criticised for his ‘mad’ project, but with time it grew to be the largest in Asia. With the discovery of streptomycin, the first antibiotic effective against tuberculosis, in 1943, the lethal impact of the disease came down. As of 2018, it has 350 beds and is mentioned as a state government hospital.
- KPC Medical College and Hospital was set up in 2007 by a non-profit foundation sponsored by Dr. Kalipada Chaudhuri, an orthopaedic surgeon and medical entrepreneur. It has approval for setting up 750 beds. As of 2018, it has 450 beds and is a private hospital.
- Baghajatin State General Hospital was established in 1991. It has 100 beds. There is a common complaint that health services of acceptable quality are not available in Baghajatin hospital. In a press release, issued in 2011, by activists who were protesting against the proposal for privatisation of the hospital, it was said, "the health Deptt of W.B. Govt. has been showing its total apathy and irresponsible gesture in conducting the hospital affair including its administration…" The hospital is widely used by the local people. It has a nursing training school.
- Bijaygarh State General Hospital has 100 beds.
