= Jodhpur Park =

Neighbourhood in Kolkata, West Bengal, India

- Neighbourhood in Kolkata (Calcutta)
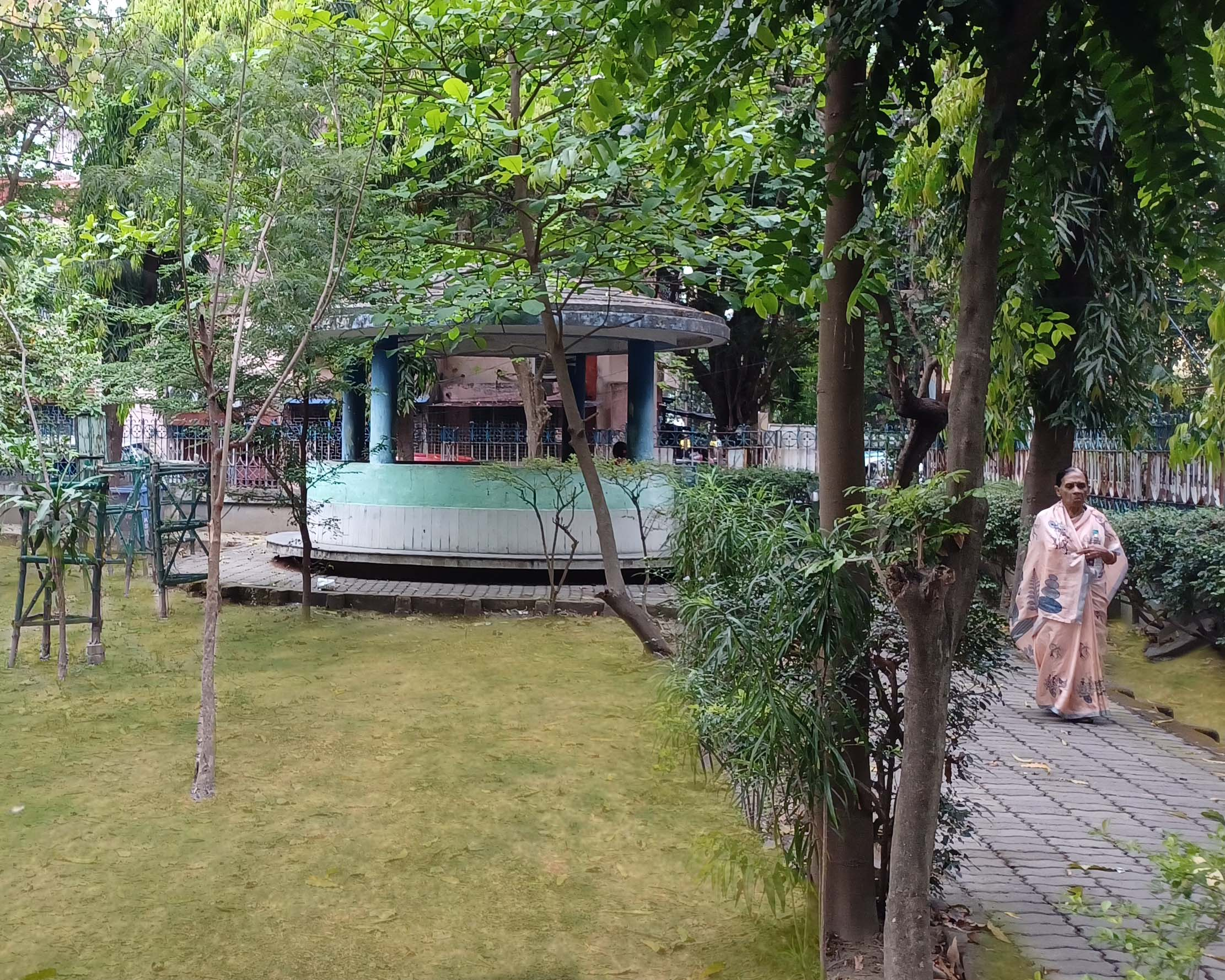

- Location in Kolkata
- Coordinates: 22°30′21″N 88°21′45″E
- Country: India
- State: West Bengal
- City: Kolkata
- District: Kolkata
- Metro Station: Rabindra Sarobar and Kavi Sukanta(under construction)
- Municipal Corporation: Kolkata Municipal Corporation
- KMC ward: 93
- Elevation: 11 m (36 ft)
- Time zone: UTC+5:30 (IST)
- Area code: +91 33
- Lok Sabha constituency: Kolkata Dakshin
- Vidhan Sabha constituency: Rashbehari

Jodhpur Park is an upscale neighbourhood in South Kolkata, in Kolkata district in West Bengal, India.

== Geography ==
It has Dhakuria to the north and the east, Gariahat Road to the east, Jadavpur to the south and Lake Gardens to the west.

A recent survey by The Telegraph (India) rated it Kolkata's 3rd best residential area after Ballygunge Place and New Alipore.

It also has a lake.

India's oldest golf club, Royal Calcutta Golf Club, is a couple of kilometres away and south-west of Jodhpur Park.

Important institutions in the vicinity include Central Glass and Ceramic Research Institute, The Regional Institute of Printing Technology, Kolkata, Regional Polytechnic, Indian Association for the Cultivation of Science, Jadavpur University and Indian Institute of Chemical Biology.

Aban Mahal and Rabindra Sarobar are some of the tourist attractions in the vicinity of Jodhpur Park.

It is well known for its proximity to South City (eastern India's biggest mall), Gariahat, Tollygunge tram depot and Dhakuria railway station. On account of its excellent connectivity to all parts of the city, it has some of Kolkata's highest real estate rates.

== History ==
The earliest history of Jodhpur Park, recorded in current land deeds start when William Graham in his own name and in the name of his clerk named Ramasasi Choudhury purchased various plots of land in Mouza Dhakuria, Gobindapur, and Salimpur, Police Station Tollygunge, District 24 Parganas and became owner of the lands that we currently call Jodhpur Park.

=== Demise of the Grahams ===
On 17 January 1931, William Graham died, leaving his will dated 3 May 1909. After probate on 31 March 1931, Mrs. Kate Emily Graham became absolute owner of these lands after probate was granted in the Testamentary and Intestate Jurisdiction of the High Court of Judicature at Fort William in Bengal. Kate Emily Graham died on 2 October 1931 and left her will dated 2 April 1931 where she directed the Official Trustee of Bengal to administer her estate and she also appointed the Official Trustee of Bengal as the executor of Kate's will. On 15 December 1931, the probate of Kate's Will was granted to the Official Trustee of Bengal and the Official Trustee of Bengal seized and possessed the lands that currently constitute Jodhpur Park.

=== Jodhpur Park Club ===
On 29 November 1935, by an indenture of Lease, (Calcutta Registration Office, Book No. 1, Volume No. 103, Pages 280–296, No. 4467 for the year 1935), the Official Trustee of Bengal granted and demised the lands to Jodhpur Club Limited for a term of 19 years commencing from 1 January 1931.

=== Bengal Secretariat Co-operative Land Mortgage Bank and Housing Society Limited ===
On 21 February 1944, the Official Trustee of Bengal sold a portion to Kishenlal Poddar and Anandilal Poddar and Jodhpur Club Limited confirmed such sale. By a Memorandum of Agreement dated 12 November 1945, the Official Trustee of Bengal agreed to sale to Messieurs Bengal Secretariat Co-operative Society Limited an area measuring approximately 80.93 acres – this area is what is currently known as Jodhpur Park. The address of these lands was No. 1, Gariahat Road and this was sold for a Rs. 10,10,000 and Bengal Secretariat Co-operative Society Limited paid this amount entirely to the Official trustee of Bengal.

During the Independence movement, the officers of the Government of Bengal, wanted that land to make their own housing colony and so they formed a registered co-operative housing society named "Bengal Secretariat Co-operative Land Mortgage Bank & Housing Society Limited" hereinafter named as the "Society". The Society was registered on 9 October 1945 and its registration number is 4/Cal/1945 and it is still existing. On 18 July 1947, the Society bought the said golf club land from the Official Trustee of Bengal at a price of about Rs. 10,10,000/- only to make their housing colony named Tollygunge Scheme (Jodhpur Club Lands).

On 23 May 1948, the Society held a Special General Meeting and prepared detail plan of the Housing Scheme. The object of the scheme was to provide homes for the members by establishing a model garden colony with all amenities of city life for the attainment of better living conditions and promotion of economic interest of the residents thereof through co-operative efforts. As per the scheme, the Society sub-divided the big plot into about 450 residential plots, about 5 cottas each, for allotment to its members for constructing their own houses either by themselves or by the Society and also provided the members with housing loans upon mortgage of their residential plots to the Society. The Society decided to make the colony self-sufficient by providing the amenities of one secondary school for boys and one secondary school for girls, one market, a hospital with maternity block, post & telegraph office, two parks, a lake, a community and civic centre for cultural developments of the colony, administrative building, community kitchens, banks and others. The Society constructed roads for inter-connecting the plots and amenities and is supposed to maintain it through co-operative principles. The society is called The Bengal Secretariat Co-operative Land Mortgage Bank and Housing Society Limited.

== Transport ==
The closest metro station is Rabindra Sarobar metro station, about 2.5 km away and is only 5-10 mins auto ride from Jodhpur Park. From the main road you can get state bus, private bus, mini bus, Volvo bus, auto and all forms of public transport available in Kolkata.

The transport connectivity of Jodhpur Park to important parts of city including Howrah, Sealdah, Gariahat, Esplanade, Salt Lake makes it well established in Kolkata. The Jadavpur connector to the EM Bypass starts at the South-East corner of Jodhpur Park and hence it is considered an important residential area of Kolkata from the point of view of connectivity.

== Healthcare ==
Jodhpur Park has advanced healthcare facilities available, with multiple hospitals, nursing homes and diagnostic centers.

Aurobindo Seva Kendra (EEDF), which was founded in February 1971 by the late Dr. S.C. Dutt is located in Jodhpur Park. The Health Centre began by rendering services from 3 rented houses in Jodhpur Park and in a mobile medical van where doctors and nurses were present to take care of the patients. In 1991, it moved to a new building and was named ‘Sri Aurobindo Seva Kendra’.

Ashok Laboratories, which started as a small diagnostic center on 2 June 1986 was the first laboratory in Eastern Indian to get NABL accreditation as per ISO/IEC 15189:2003 guidelines. Located in Jodhpur Park, it is the third laboratory in India to be accredited under the guidelines of NABL (ISO 15189) and apart from routine day to day clinical diagnostic work, is also carrying out valuable research work in the fields of infertility treatment, medical microbiology, clinical biochemistry and others. The lab also has set up a nucleic acid amplification facility for Tuberculosis diagnosis and flow cytometry for cell immunotyping.

Jodhpur Park Nursing & Maternity Home Pv. Ltd was incorporated on 31 March 1977 and is a private nursing home located at 127 Jodhpur Park.

Yet another multi-specialty clinic in Jodhpur Park is the K.D. Cure Nursing Home located near Jodhpur Park Post Office. Some of the services provided by the Clinic are laparoscopic surgery, treatment for gastric cancer, colorectal surgery, gastrointestinal surgery and liver surgery.

The closest trauma care center is located very close by on the other side of Dhakuria Bridge at AMRI Dhakuria. The hospital also has excellent set up for 'Golden Hour' support in Cardiac Sciences, along with facilities for advanced treatment procedures in angioplasty, CABG, valve replacement, etc. The cardiac Emergency department at AMRI Hospital-Dhakuria provides support across the board, from paediatric to geriatric.

== Education ==
Jodhpur Park has multiple secondary schools and several universities nearby. Jodhpur Park Boys' School and Jodhpur Park Girls' School were set up to provide quality education within Jodhpur Park. Another high school is Andrew's High School, founded in 1952

In addition, there are numerous private educational institutes. There is a centre for abacus-based education for children aged 4-13 at UCMAS Jodhpur Park

Some important institutes in and around Jodhpur Park region include Central Glass and Ceramic Research Institute, Regional Institute of Printing Technology, Regional Polytechnic, Indian Association for the Cultivation of Science, Jadavpur University, Indian Institute of Chemical Biology etc.
