= South City Mall =

Shopping mall in Kolkata, India

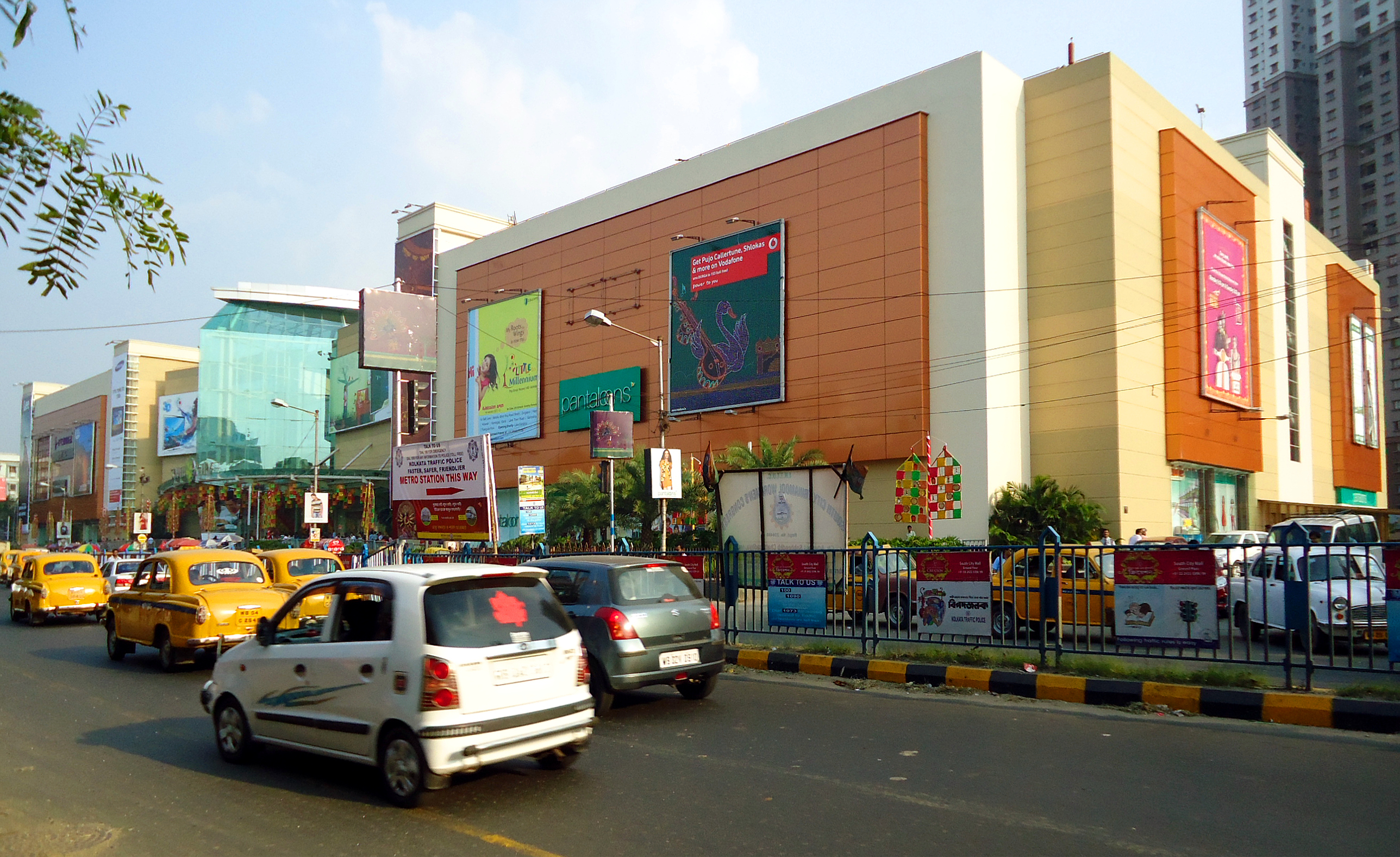
- South City Mall in 2011
- Location: Jadavpur, South Kolkata, West Bengal, India
- Coordinates: 22.5014°N 88.3616°E
- Address: 375 Prince Anwar Shah Road
- Opened: 16 January 2008
- Developer: South City Projects (Kolkata) Ltd.
- Architect: ICS Bentel Associates
- Num. of stores: 167
- Num. of anchor tenants: 6
- Floor area: 1,000,000 sq ft (93,000 m^{2})
- Floors: 6 (2 basements)
- Parking: 1,500 vehicles
- Website: southcitymall.in

South City Mall is a shopping mall in South Kolkata, West Bengal. Located at Prince Anwar Shah Road, Jadavpur (where the erstwhile Usha Industries factories and staff quarters were situated), it has been open since 16 January 2008. It has a Gross Leasable Area of 1,000,000 sq ft (93,000 m^{2}) and parking for 2,500 vehicles.

The mall was designed by retail specialist ICS Bentel Associates. Anchored by major stores like Pantaloons, Spencer's Retail and Shoppers Stop, there are also 134 other stores, a food court on the top floor and an INOX multiplex.

The adjoining South City Township, with four 35-storey and one 15-storey residential highrises, was built by the same developer - South City Projects.

== Features ==
- South City Mall houses a six screen INOX multiplex, at the lounge cum food court inside the multiplex's premises. Now it also includes an IMAX multiplex, the only one of its kind in Kolkata.
- It houses a food court called The Food Street, which contains kiosks of food from around the world. It also features some restaurants. Confectionery is available at Café Coffee Day.
- It includes pantaloons.

== Incidents ==
=== Ladder collapse ===
In 2014, one person died and three were critically injured when a ladder they were using collapsed.

=== Fire ===
On 4 December 2016 which was a Sunday morning at 9:15 am fire broke out at South City Mall Food Court. People noticed black smoke engulfing the food court. Security guards immediately severed electric connections and alerted people watching the movie show in the multiplex. The movie which was running in the Inox Movie Theatre was stopped and viewers and visitors were taken out safely from South City Mall. No people were injured.15 fire tenders rushed to spot and controlled the fire. Fire minister Sovon Chatterjee visited the spot. Following this incident the South City Mall management decided to shut down the mall for four months starting from 1 February 2017. During this temporary closure the mall is rumored to undergo some major makeovers to make it safer and more environment friendly.

== Renovation ==
The developers also announced an upgrade of the mall, which started on February 1, 2017. It involved a complete renovation with most shops being removed or shifted from their initial slot, and the entry of many boutique global brands like Starbucks and Harley-Davidson (only clothing accessories). A new floor is being constructed to accommodate the food court, which will be shifted from the 3rd floor, for making space for new shops. Thus, after completion, the mall will house 4 floors. Although the mall has been partially opened on 22 December 2017, construction work completed on 2018.

Global private equity firm Blackstone Inc. acquired the mall for ₹3,250 crore (equivalent to ₹34 billion or US$360 million in 2026) in a deal finalized in June 2025, making it Kolkata’s largest real estate transaction at the time. The deal, advised by the ANAROCK Group, is the Blackstone's largest real estate deal in India.

== See also ==
- Quest Mall
- Mani Square Mall
- New Market
- Lake Mall
- Wood Square Mall
