= South City =

Building complex in Kolkata

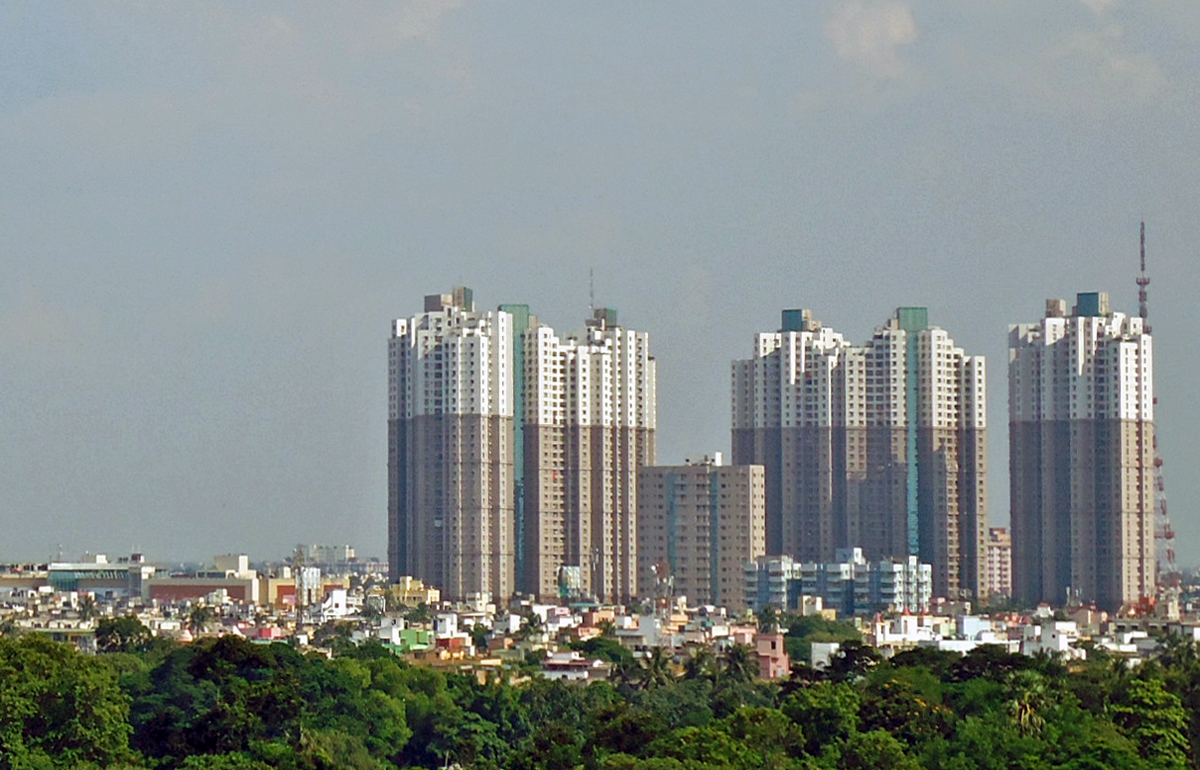
- South City Residential Complex in Kolkata

General information
- Status: Completed
- Location: Jadavpur, Kolkata, India
- Construction started: 2004
- Completed: 2008; 18 years ago

Height
- Height: 117 metres (384 ft)

Technical details
- Floor count: 35

South City is a 31.14-acre (126,000 m^{2}) condominium in Kolkata, India. It is situated at Prince Anwar Shah Road in Jadavpur. It is also close to the Jodhpur Park and Tollygunge areas of the city. Most of the recent real estate development in Kolkata has taken place in the E.M. Bypass area and Greater Kolkata (Salt Lake, New Town, etc.). However, the South City complex is in the heart of the city.

The condominium features a residential complex, which includes recreational facilities, a school, an infirmary, a shopping mall and a social club.

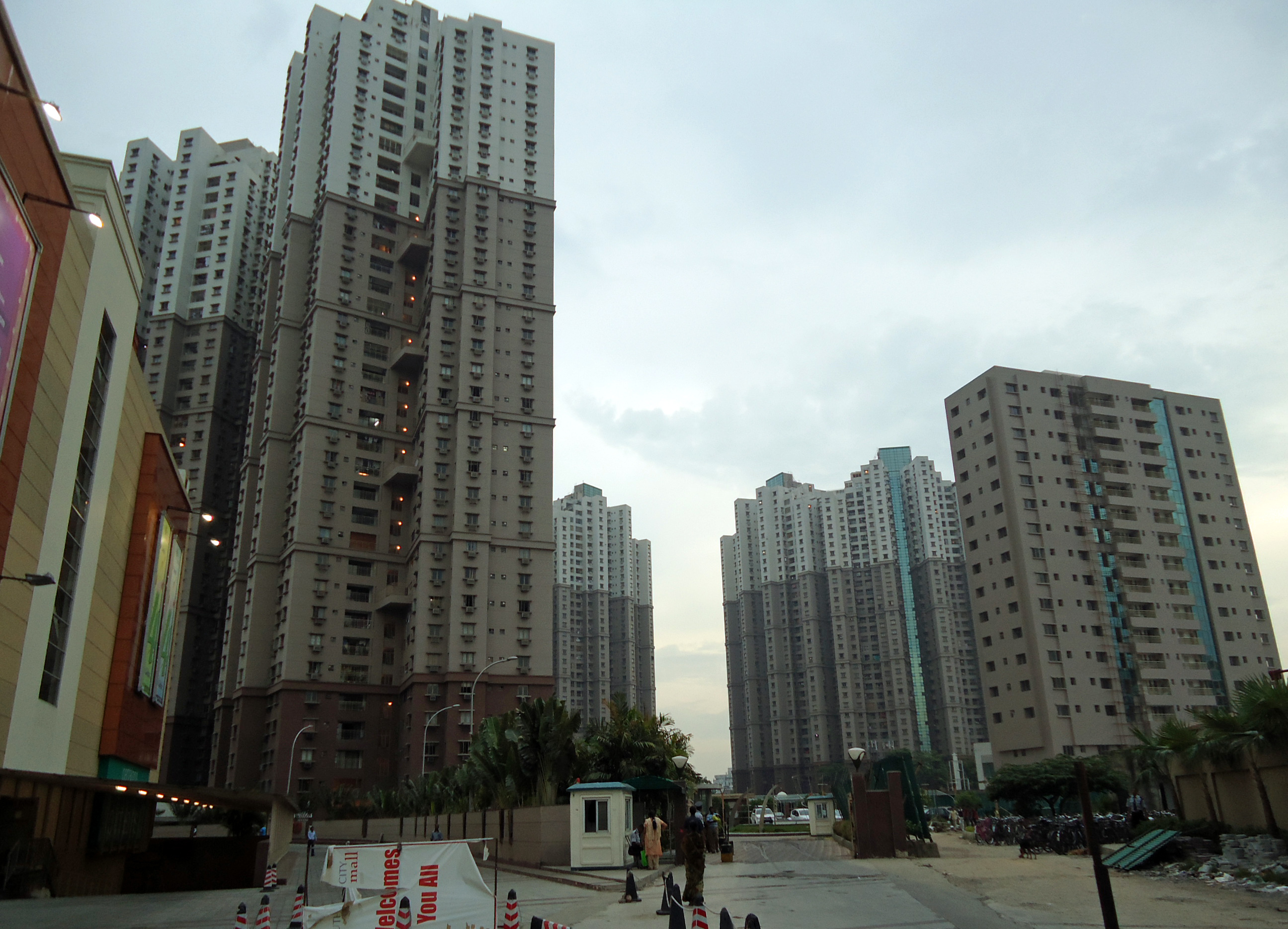
South City residence exit gate

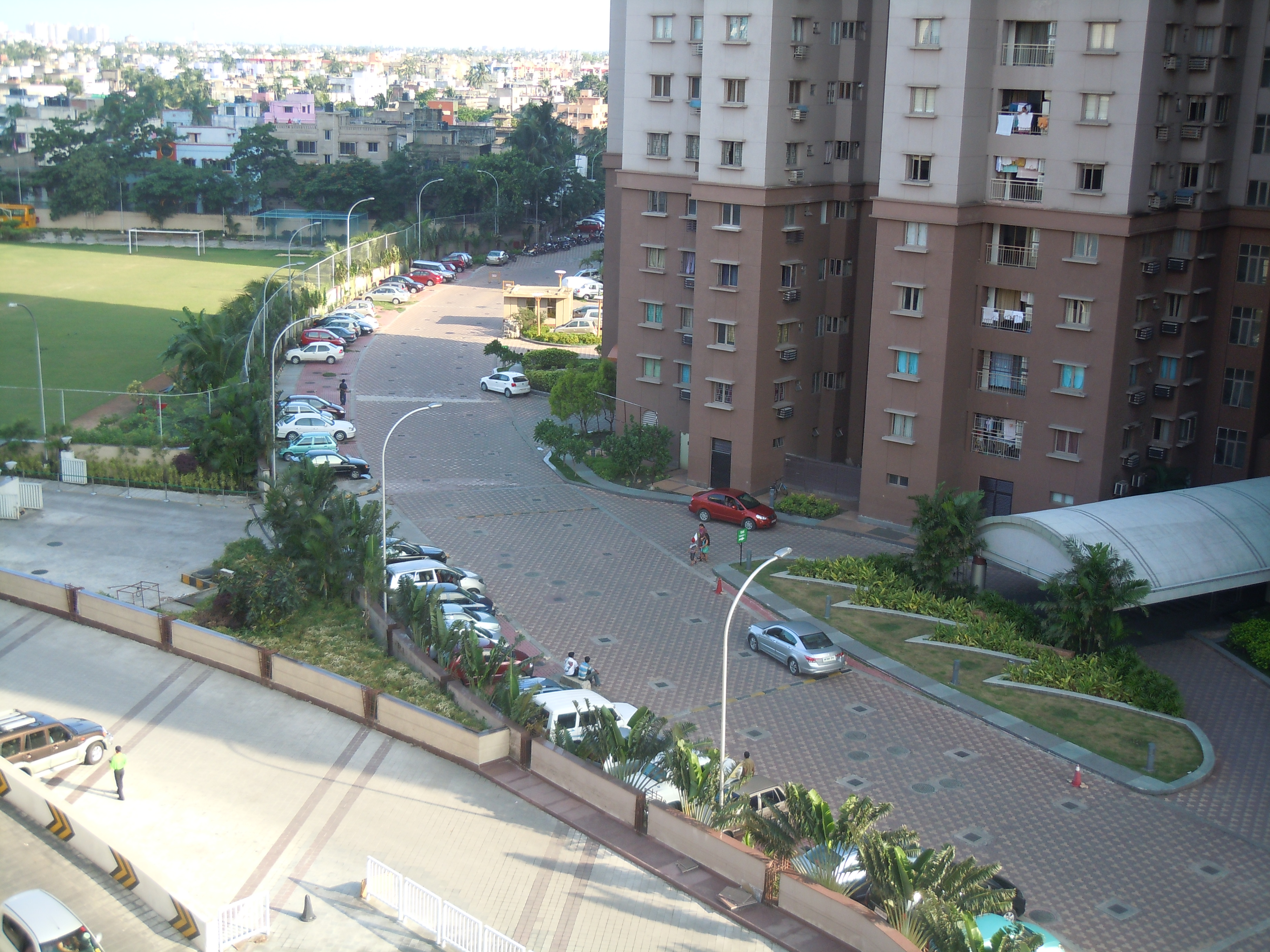
Inside view of the complex

The residential complex is a condominium and has 5 residential towers – 4 towers of 35 floors and 1 tower of 15 floors. Once the tallest residential towers in the city, as of 2013, the 35-story buildings are presently the second tallest in Eastern India. They rise up to a height of 117 metres (384 ft). The first, second, third and fourth tower are named Oak, Pine, Maple and Cedar, respectively. Around 1,700 families live in the complex. There is a rainwater harvesting system in the complex.

The South City Mall located just outside the complex is one of the biggest and most popular malls in Eastern India.

The South City International School situated adjacent to the complex premises is affiliated with the Board of Indian School Certificate Examinations and as well as an International Board.

The South City Club has one of the largest swimming pools in Kolkata, as well as facilities for badminton, table tennis, lawn tennis, and billiards, and a library, gym, guest rooms, and a massage centre.

== See also ==
- List of tallest buildings in Kolkata
- List of tallest buildings in India
- List of tallest buildings and structures in the Indian subcontinent
- South City Mall
