= Central Glass and Ceramic Research Institute =

Indian national research institute

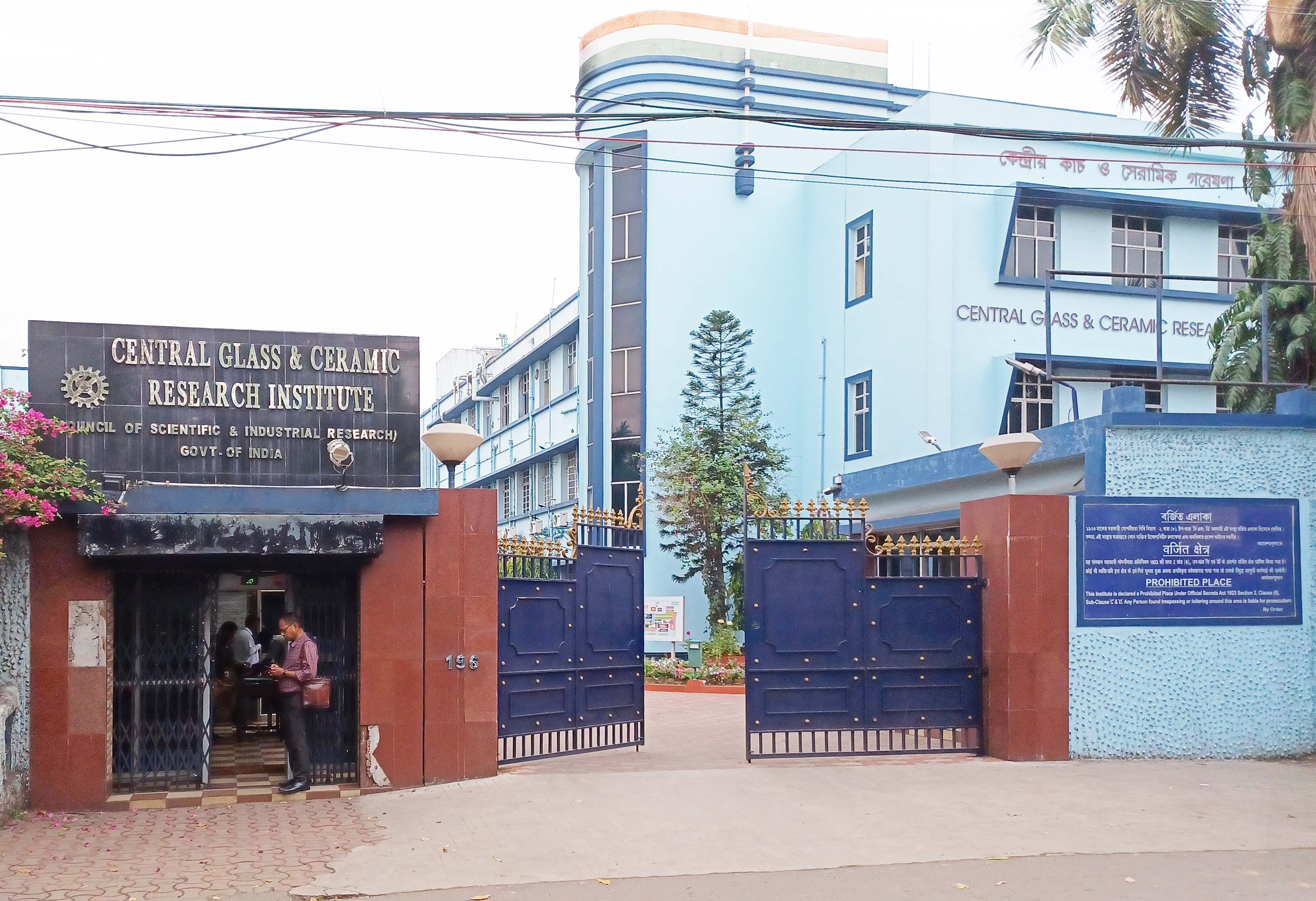
- Nickname: CGCRI, Kolkata
- Motto: karmaṇaiva hi saṁsiddhim
- Established: c. 1950; 76 years ago
- Laboratory type: Research and development
- Research type: Ceramic and allied industries.
- Field of research: Advanced Ceramics; Composites; Biomaterials; Medical Devices; Energy materials; Energy storage; Fiber Optics; Photonics; Functional materials & Devices; Membrane; Separation Technology; Refractory & Traditional Ceramics; Specialty Glass
- Director: Bikramjit Basu
- Location: Kolkata, West Bengal, India; 22°50′24″N 88°36′39″E
- Campus: Large city
- Affiliations: AcSIR
- Operating agency: Council of Scientific and Industrial Research
- Website: www.cgcri.res.in

Central Glass and Ceramic Research Institute (CGCRI) is a Kolkata-based National Research Institute under the Council of Scientific and Industrial Research, India. Established in 1950, it focuses on the areas of glass, ceramics, mica, refractories etc.
