= Golf Green =

- Neighbourhood in Kolkata (Calcutta)
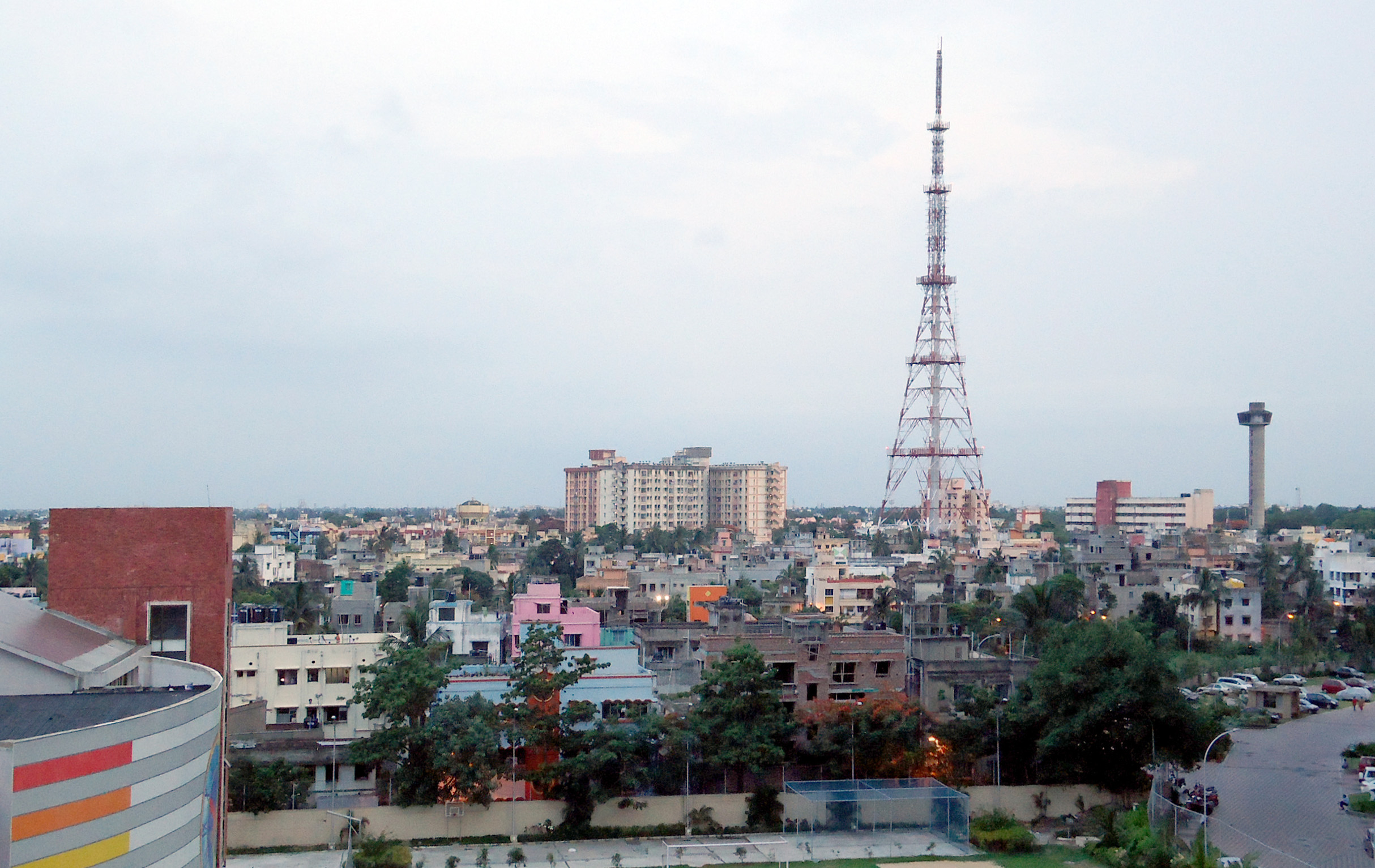
- TV tower at Golf Green

- Location in Kolkata Golf Green (West Bengal)
- Coordinates: 22°29′34″N 88°21′41″E
- Country: India
- State: West Bengal
- City: Kolkata
- District: Kolkata
- Metro station: Rabindra Sarobar and Mahanayak Uttam Kumar
- Municipal Corporation: Kolkata Municipal Corporation
- KMC wards: 93, 94, 95
- Elevation: 36 ft (11 m)
- Time zone: UTC+5:30 (IST)
- PIN: 700033, 700040, 700095
- Area code: +91 33
- Lok Sabha constituency: Kolkata Dakshin
- Vidhan Sabha constituency: Rashbehari and Tollygunge

Golf Green is a locality of South Kolkata in West Bengal, India. The neighbourhood derives its name from the Royal Calcutta Golf Club, which is located in the vicinity.
