= Rabindra Sarobar metro station =

Metro station in Kolkata, India

Rabindra Sarobar
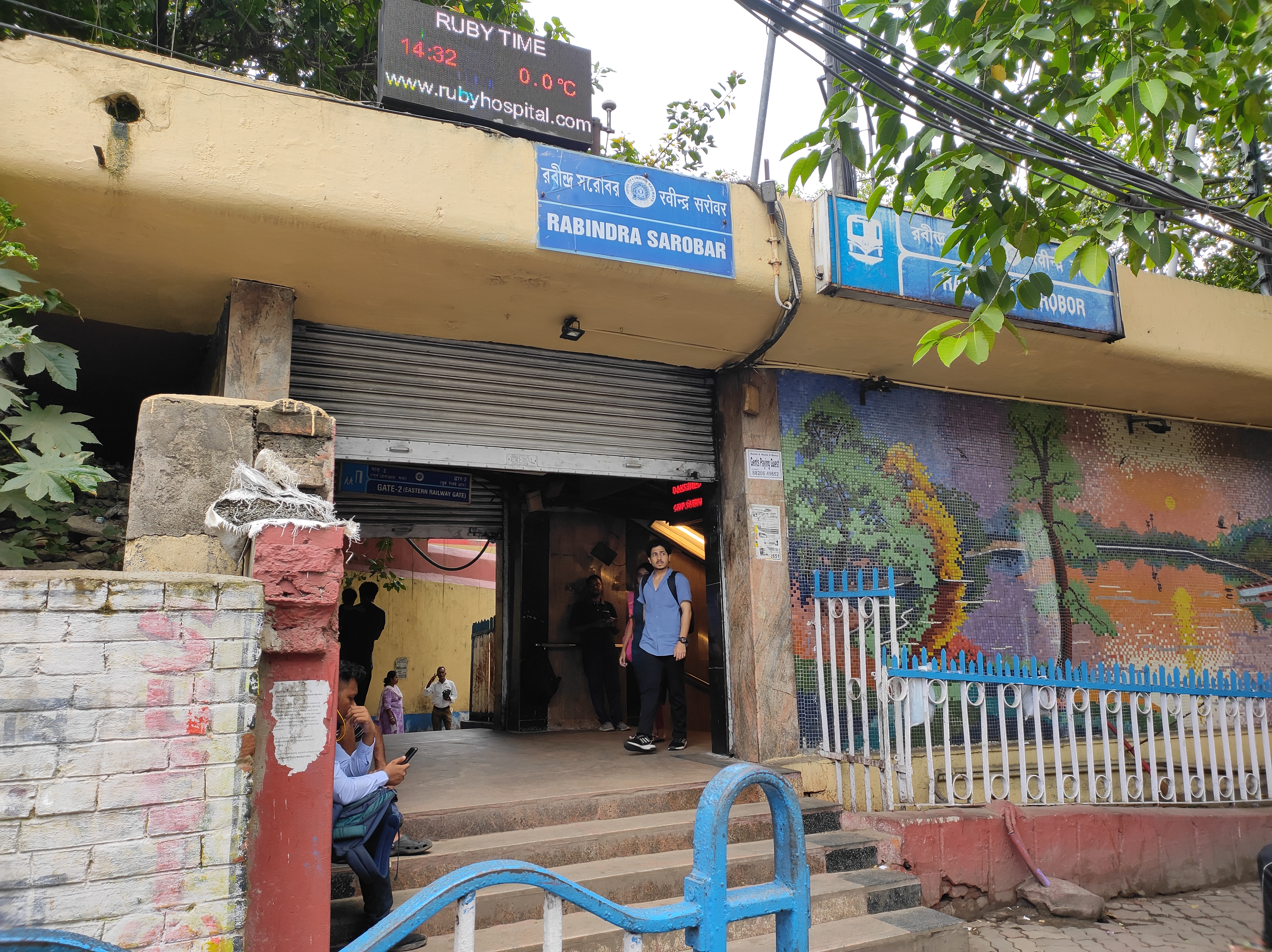

General information
- Location: Deshapran Sasmal Rd, Tollygunge; Kolkata, West Bengal 700033; India
- Coordinates: 22.50570°N 88.34521°E
- System: Kolkata Metro
- Operator: Metro Railway, Kolkata
- Line: Blue Line
- Platforms: 2 (1 Island platform)
- Connections: Tollygunge: Sealdah South; Circular

Construction
- Structure type: Underground
- Accessible: Yes

Other information
- Station code: KRSB

History
- Opened: 29 April 1986; 40 years ago

Services
Preceding station	Kolkata Metro	Following station
Kalighat towards Dakshineswar	Blue Line	Mahanayak Uttam Kumar towards Shahid Khudiram
Route map
Location

Rabindra Sarobar is an underground metro station on the North-South corridor of the Blue Line of Kolkata Metro in Kolkata, West Bengal, India. It is situated on Deshapran Sasmal Road in Charu Market, Tollygunge. The station is named after Rabindra Sarobar, an artificial lake of South Kolkata.

== Station layout ==
G	Street level	Exit/Entrance
L1	Mezannine	Fare control, station agent, Ticket/token, shops, crossover
L2	Platform 2	Train towards Shahid Khudiram (Mahanayak Uttam Kumar) →
L2	Island platform, Doors will open on the right
L2	Platform 1	← Train towards Dakshineswar (Rabindra Sadan)

== Entry/Exit ==
- 1/2 – Tollygunge station, Lake Gardens, Sarat Chatterjee Ave., Mudiali
- 3/4 – Private Gali Rd., Tollygunge Rd., Pratadaditya Rd., Charuchandra Ave.
- 5 – Bhavani Cinema Hall, Charu Market Police Station, Tollygunge Circular Rd, Tollygunge Phari.
- 6 – Swiss Park, Tipu Sultan Mosque, Prince Anwar Shah Rd, Deshapran Sashmal Rd.

== Connections ==
=== Bus ===
Bus route number 1A, 1B, 12C/1B, 21, 21/1, 40A, 40B, 41, 41B, 45B, 47/1, 47B, 80A, 205, 205A, 208, 228, 234/1, SD4, S112 (Mini), S113 (Mini), S114 (Mini), S117 (Mini), S135 (Mini), S188 (Mini), C2A, C8, C14/1, M7B, S2, S4, S4C, S6A, S7, S17A, S22, AC1, AC4B, AC6, AC47, V1, V9 etc. serve the station.

=== Train ===
Tollygunge railway station is adjacent to the station.

=== Tram ===
Tram route number 24/29 serves the station.

== See also ==
- Kolkata
- List of Kolkata Metro stations
- Transport in Kolkata
- Kolkata Metro Rail Corporation
- Kolkata Suburban Railway
- Kolkata Monorail
- Trams in Kolkata
- Garia
- Tollygunge
- E.M. Bypass
- List of rapid transit systems
- List of metro systems
