= Surendranath College =

College in Kolkata, West Bengal, India

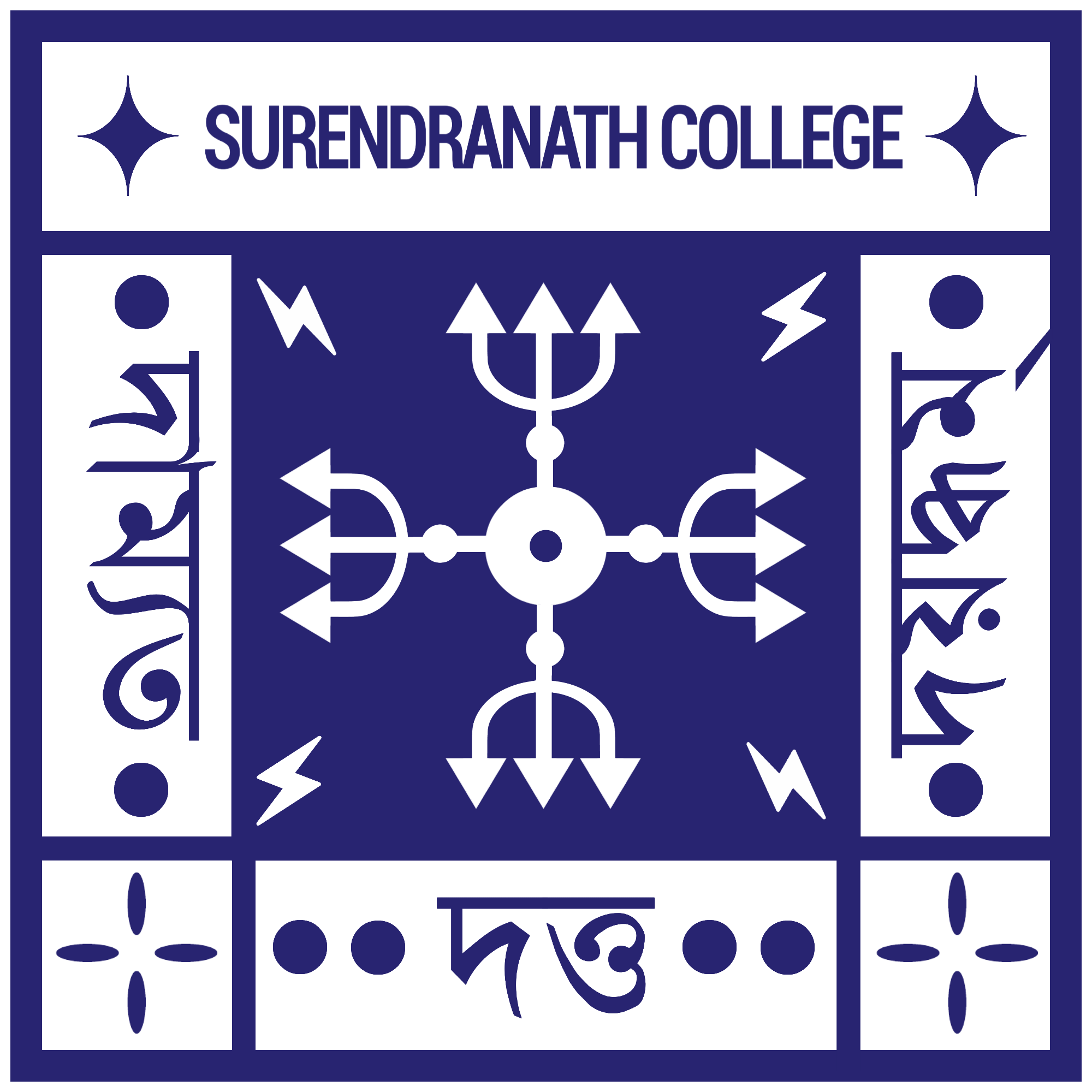
- Logo of Surendranath College
- Former names: Presidency School (1882–1884); Presidency Institution (1884); Ripon College (1884–1947)
- Type: Undergraduate college
- Established: 1882; 144 years ago
- Academic affiliations: University of Calcutta
- Teacher-in-charge: Dr. Purnendu Prakash Pal
- Location: 24/2, MG Road, Baithakkhana, Sealdah, Kolkata, West Bengal, 700009, India; 22.5707434°N 88.3673246°E
- Campus: Urban
- Website: Surendranath College
- Location within Kolkata Location within India

Surendranath College is an undergraduate college affiliated to the University of Calcutta, in Kolkata, India. It was founded in 1882 by the nationalist leader and scholar Surendranath Banerjee. It offers undergraduate and postgraduate level courses in various arts, commerce and science subjects.

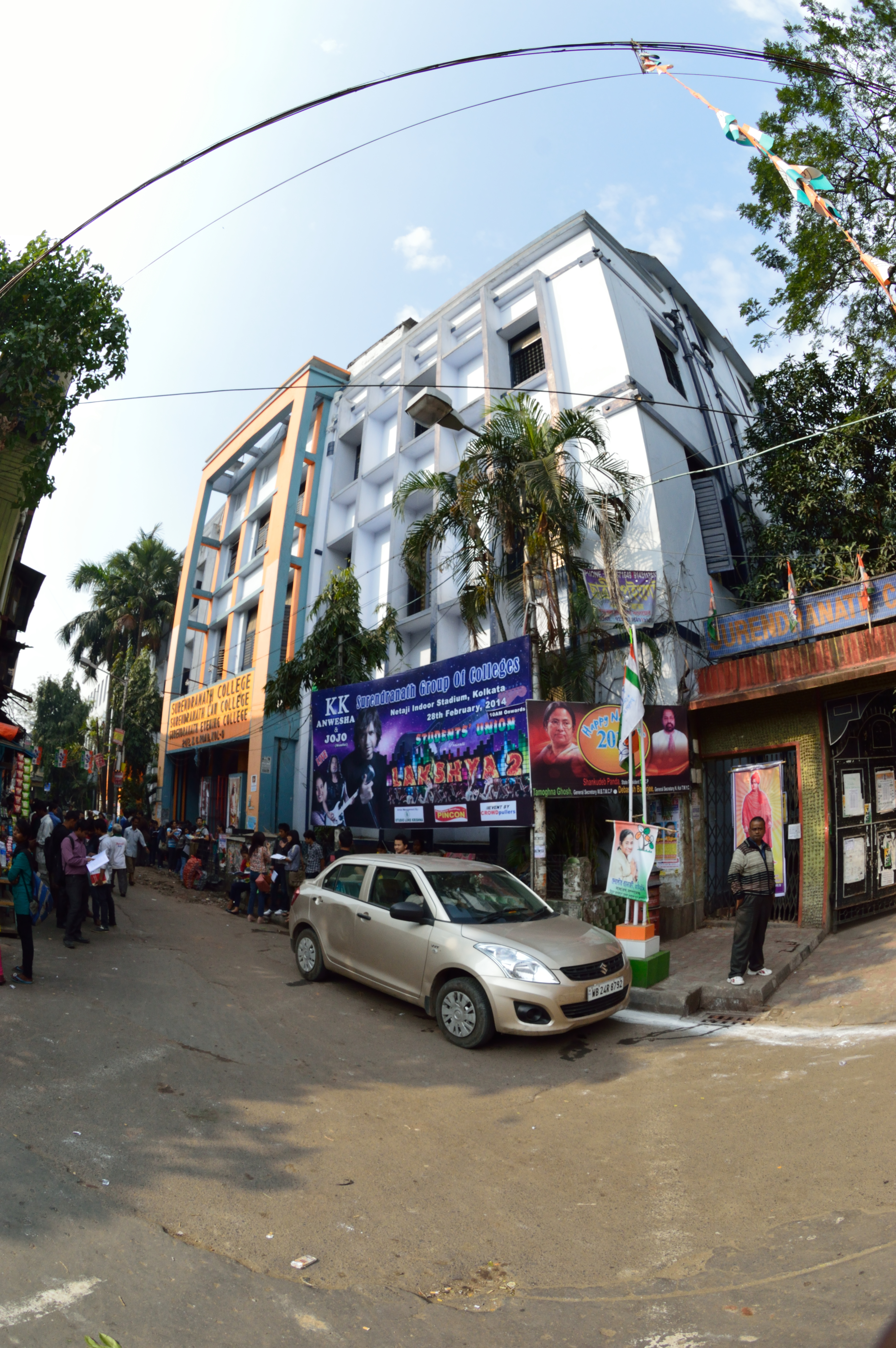
The Surendranath College, 24/2 Mahatma Gandhi road, Kolkata. Feb. 2014

== History ==
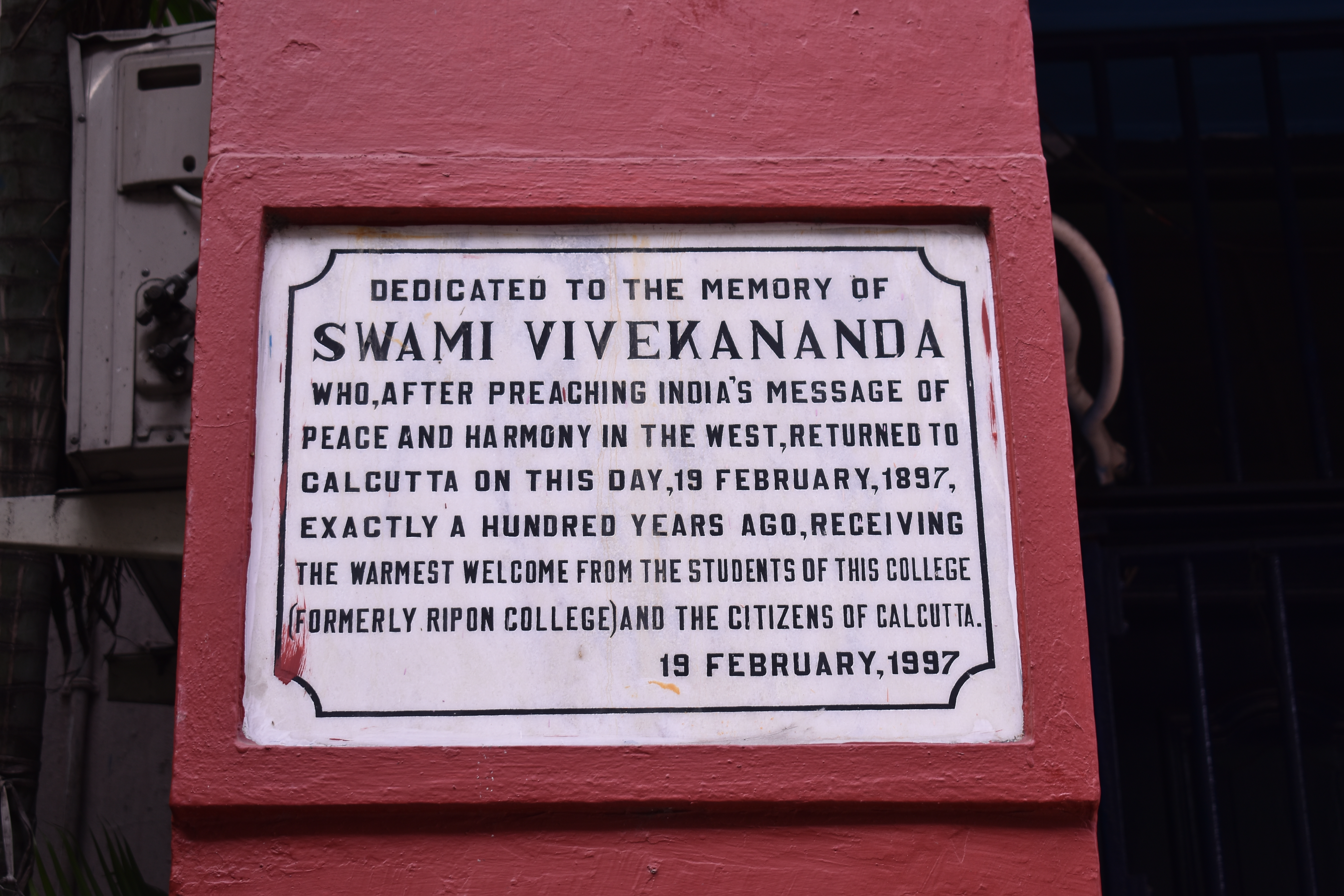
Commemorative plaque honoring Swami Vivekananda in the college

This college owed its origin to the Presidency School. In 1882, Surendranath Banerjee took over the charge of the presidency school. In 1884, this school was renamed as Presidency Institution and affiliated to the University of Calcutta. Later, in the same year, with permission from Lord Ripon, this school was elevated to a first grade degree college and named as Ripon College. Surendranath Banerjee entrusted his close friend and political associate, Gagan Chandra Biswas, who was an Engineer from Shibpur and fully committed to the nationalist cause, to design the college building. Subsequently, he built the building which has been modified and improved throughout the years. In 1884-85, this college started the Department of Law. Later in 1911, this law section was converted into a separate law College and named as Ripon Law College. In 1931, women's section was opened. In 1947, trustees of this college opened an evening science section. In 1960, both the evening and women's section became a separate degree college. Evening section of this college is known as Surendranath Evening College and the women's section became an independent Degree College, named, Surendranath College for Women.

Initially was known as Ripon College, named for the British Viceroy Lord Ripon, but in 1948–1949, it was renamed for its founder. Swami Vivekananda delivered his first address in Calcutta from the rostrum of college campus on his return from Chicago after his famous deliverance at the Parliament of the World's Religions.

== Departments and courses ==
The college offers different undergraduate and postgraduate courses and aims at imparting education to the undergraduates and postgraduates of upper-, lower- and middle-class people of Kolkata and its adjoining areas.

=== Science ===
Science faculty consists of the departments of Chemistry, Physics, Mathematics, Statistics, Computer Science & Application, Botany, Zoology, Physiology, Microbiology, Psychology, and Economics.

=== Arts & Commerce ===
Arts and Commerce faculty consists of departments of Bengali, English, Sanskrit, History, Geography, Political Science, Philosophy, Journalism & Mass Communication, Sociology, and Commerce.

== Accreditation ==
Surendranath College are recognized by the University Grants Commission (UGC). This college was accrediated by NAAC and awarded B+ grade in 2017.

== Social initiative ==
During the Coronavirus Pandemic in India, with the demand for hand sanitizers raised in the wake of the Coronavirus scare, Surendranath College made a low-cost sanitiser meeting WHO guidelines. Apart from the chemical ingredients available at the lab, other contents such as Alcohol and Hydrogen Peroxide were procured from market, and the concoction was prepared meeting WHO specifications. The sanitiser is named Sparsho (touch) and the bottles were distributed for free among the locals

== Controversy ==
On 2 June 2026, a secret chamber were discovered inside the College Union room. Major political and financial controversy erupted after the incident. After discovery of 1 crore in termite-infested cash, illegal weapons and hidden luxury rooms leads huge scandals in Kolkata. Kolkata Police registered FIR at the Muchipara Police Station naming Debashish Banerjee and Paritosh Dutta, Trinamool Congress leaders.

== Eminent faculty ==
- Jadunath Sarkar, eminent Indian historian
- Sir Surendranath Banerjee - Founder of Indian National Association, precursor to Indian National Congress
- Buddhadeb Bosu - Poet and novelist
- Bishnu Dey, Poet, Jnanpith Award winner
- Mira Datta Gupta - Eminent Social Activist and Politician
- Hiren Mukherjee - Ex Faculty - Department of History/ Ex Parliamentarian
- Phani Bhusan Chakravartti - First Indian chief Justice of the Calcutta High Court
- Ramendra Sundar Tribedi - a renowned Bengali author, later was also Principal of College
- Pramathanath Bishi - Indian writer, educationist, and parliamentarian during 1936–1946 as professor of Bangla
- Debaprasad Ghosh

== Notable alumni ==
- Farrukh Ahmed - poet
- Bibhutibhushan Bandopadhyay - novelist
- Birendranath Sasmal - Notable freedom fighter, barrister and political activist. Known as Deshapran
- Sachindra Prasad Bose - political activist
- Charu Chandra Bhandari - political activist and leader of Sarvodaya Movement
- Nirad C. Chaudhuri - author
- Shawkat Ali - novelist
- Dhirendranath Datta - Bangladeshi language movement leader
- Padma Nidhi Dhar - politician
- Anil Kumar Gain - mathematician from the University of Cambridge, Fellow of the Royal Society
- Sunil Gangopadhyay - novelist, poet
- Akbar Hossain - novelist
- Chintamoni Kar - sculptor; principal of Government College of Art & Craft, Kolkata
- Hamiduddin Ahmad Khan - provincial minister of East Bengal
- Maulvi Tamizuddin Khan - former speaker of Pakistan's Constituent Assembly
- Mohitlal Majumdar - literary critic
- Sailen Manna - captain, Indian soccer team (1952 Olympic Games)
- Mohammad Mohammadullah - former president of Bangladesh
- Mani Shankar Mukherjee - novelist
- Bishnu Prasad Rabha - author, poet, music director
- Shaktipada Rajguru - Bengali author
- Nawajesh Ahmed - Bangladeshi politician and lawyer
- Sunil K. Dutt - Indian photo Journalist
- Samik Bhattacharya - Politician
- Jeetu Kamal - Indian Actor
- K. C. Nag - Indian Mathematician and teacher
- Ranjan Shaw, Founder of Margastha Research Foundation

== See also ==
- Surendranath Law College
- Surendranath Evening College
- Surendranath College for Women
- List of colleges affiliated to the University of Calcutta
- Education in India
- Education in West Bengal
