= Ramender =

- Gender: Male
- Language: Hindi

Origin
- Region of origin: India

Other names
- Alternative spelling: Ramendra; Raminder

Ramender is a name of Indian origin. Also spelt Ramendra or Raminder, this name in Hindi or Sanskrit is composed of two words, Rama and Indra (or Inder).

== List of persons with the given name ==
- Ramendra Sundar Tribedi, Indian (Bengali) author
- Raminder Gill, Canadian politician
