= Harrison Road =

Harrison Road may mean:

- Harrison Road (Ohio), the former name for part of U.S. Route 52 west of Cincinnati, Ohio, United States
- Mahatma Gandhi Road, Kolkata, in the Indian city of Kolkata (previously known as Calcutta).
