= Sealdah =

- Neighbourhood in Kolkata (Calcutta)
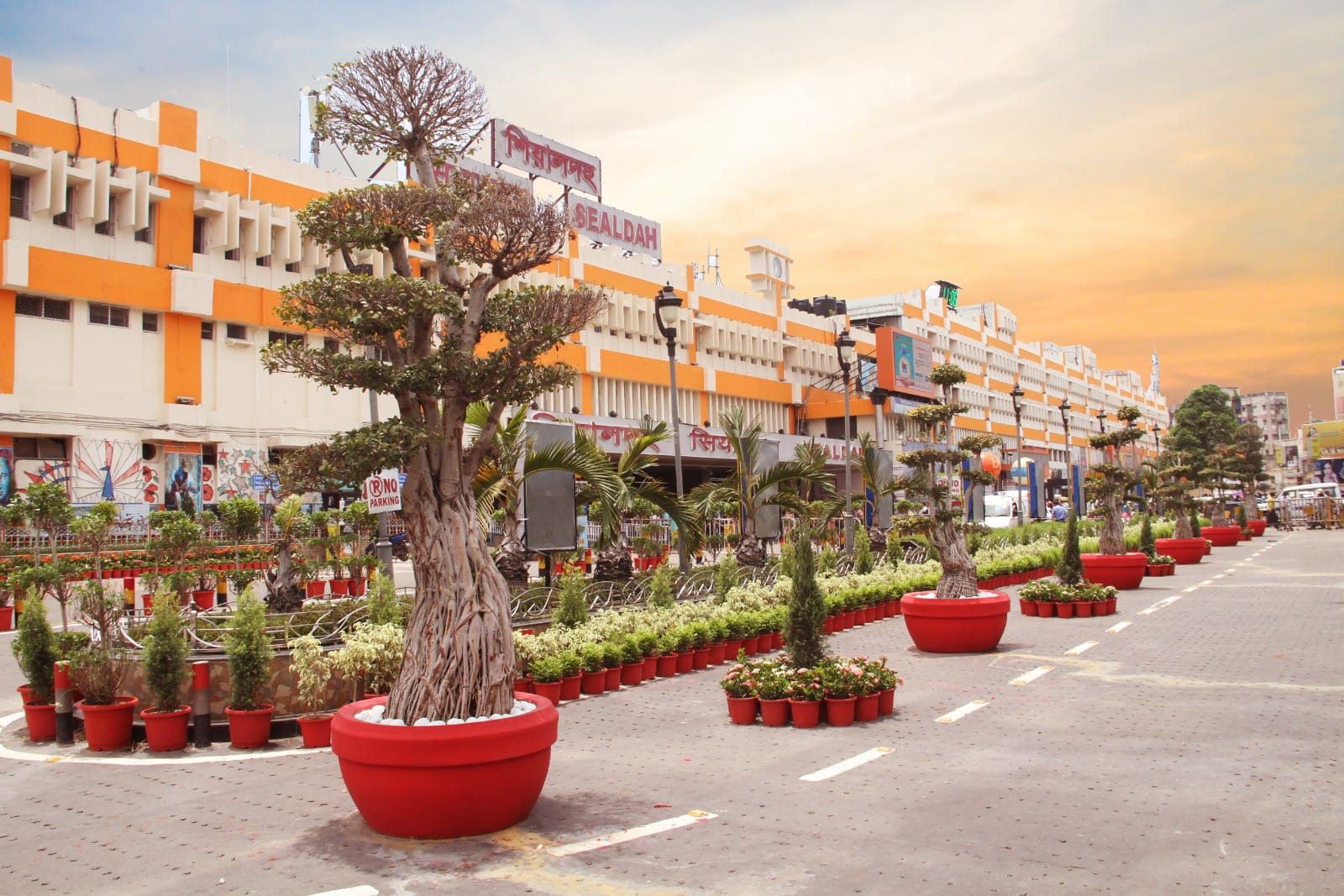
- Sealdah Railway Station

- Location in Kolkata
- Coordinates: 22.566235°N 88.368611°E
- Country: India
- State: West Bengal
- City: Kolkata
- District: Kolkata
- Metro Station: Sealdah
- Municipal Corporation: Kolkata Municipal Corporation
- KMC wards: 36, 37, 49, 50, 54, 55

Population
  - Total: For population see linked KMC ward page
- Time zone: UTC+5:30 (IST)
- PIN: 700009, 700014
- Area code: +91 33
- Lok Sabha constituency: Kolkata Uttar
- Vidhan Sabha constituency: Beleghata, Jorasanko, Chowranghee and Entally

Sealdah is a neighbourhood of Central Kolkata in Kolkata district in the Indian state of West Bengal.

== Etymology ==
Jackal (sheal in Bengali) howled around Sealdah. Antiquarians identify it as Shrigaldwipa (Jackal Island). Nearby Beliaghata was a port in the Salt Lakes.

== History ==
The East India Company obtained from the Mughal emperor Farrukhsiyar, in 1717, the right to rent from 38 villages surrounding their settlement. Of these 5 lay across the Hooghly in what is now Howrah district. The remaining 33 villages were on the Calcutta side. After the fall of Siraj-ud-daulah, the last independent Nawab of Bengal, it purchased these villages in 1758 from Mir Jafar and reorganised them. These villages were known en-bloc as Dihi Panchannagram and Sealdah was one of them.

Sealdah was described in 1757 as a "narrow causeway, several feet above the level of the country, leading from the east".

In 1756, when Siraj-ud-daulah attacked the English at Calcutta, a major part of his troops and artillery crossed the Maratha Ditch in Sealdah. There was hard fighting here with 39 English soldiers and 18 Indian sepoys killed on the spot. The English dragged their guns through the rice fields.

Baithakkana was a resting place, where merchants formed and dispersed their caravans, sheltered by an old banyan tree (called a peepul tree by Cotton). Job Charnock is said to have chosen the site of Kolkata for a city, in consequence of the pleasure he found in sitting and smoking under the shade of a large tree.

A present-day road stretching from Bepin Behari Ganguly Street to MG Road is called Baithakkhana Road, as well as the market along the road at the southern (Bowbazar/ B.B. Ganguly Street) end is called Baithakkhana Bazar.

The Maratha Ditch was dug in 1742 and it was partly filled up in 1799 to create the Circular Road (now Acharya Prafulla Chandra Road). The eighty-foot-wide Harrison Road (now MG Road), was built in from 1889 to 1892.

The first list of thanas (police stations) in Calcutta was made in 1765 and Muchipara was not there in the list. Muchipara, named after muchis (cobblers and leather workers), possibly shot in to prominence in the early 19th century. In 1888, one of the 25 newly organized police section houses was located in Muchipara.

The East Bengal Railway opened its track from Calcutta to Kushtia in 1862. At the Calcutta end there was a tin-roofed station room. Sealdah railway station had a proper station building in 1869. The present Sealdah-Ranaghat line was a part of the Sealdah-Kushtia line and was subsequently extended to Goalundo Ghat.

== Geography ==
=== Police district ===
Muchipara police station is part of the Central division of Kolkata Police.

== Economy ==
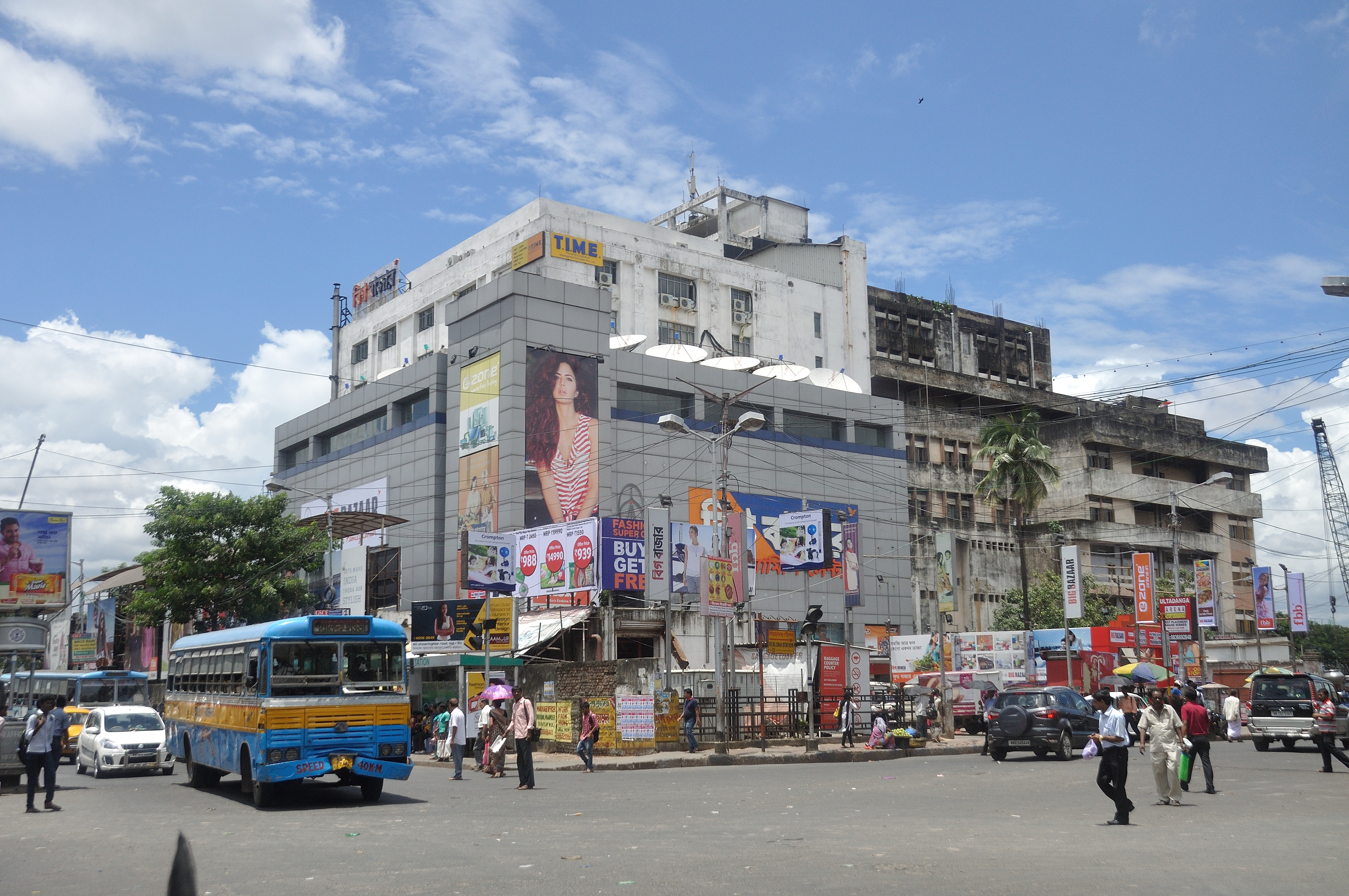
Sealdah Commercial Complex, Parikshit Roy Lane

Sealdah market, along with Hatibagan, Maniktala, Lake Market and Gariahat markets, is amongst the largest markets in Kolkata. Very similar to village weekly hats, Kolkata's markets thrive in a sprawling and makeshift environment. Sealdah market is an agglomeration of various markets in the area. There is the Sealdah Area market spread for about a kilometre along both sides of MG Road from Purabi to Chhabighar cinema halls selling mainly vegetables and fruits. Sealdah Dimer Bazar, in Hayat Khan Lane and Panchu Khansama Lane, is an egg arat. Baitakkhna Market, spread across 2 acres at 15/16 Baithakkhana Road, sells vegetable, fruits, betel leaf, flower, fish, meat, egg, grocery etc. New Baithakkhana Market (also known as Chhagalkata Fish Market), spread across 5 acres at 155–158, B.B. Ganguly Street, is a fish market. Kolay Market, located near Sealdah Station, is the largest wholesale market in Kolkata, handling vegetables and other daily needs. It is open 24/7 and has not closed down even during strikes. Bow Bazar market, stretching from Sealdah crossing to College Street crossing, is virtually an extension of Sealdah market zone.

Baithakkhana is one of the largest paper markets in India. However, the letterpress business, once the largest printing process in the country and the pride of Bengal, has lost out to more modern systems. Some 10–15 letterpress printers are still there in Baithakkhana, struggling hard to retain a foothold in the tough competition. MG Road, from Sealdah to College Street, is a big market for wedding and visiting cards.

== Transport ==
Sealdah railway station handles in all around 20 lakh (2 million) passengers daily. A bulk of those using the station, around 12 lakhs, commute daily for work in 917 local trains. The East-West Metro line connects to a station at Sealdah and around 5 lakh passengers are likely to use the Metro station.

19th century Kolkata was a city of palanquins and horse-drawn carriages. The tramway was the first attempt at mass transport. The first horse-driven tramcar rolled out on 24 February 1873, running between Armenian Ghat and Sealdah via Bowbazar, as well as Dalhousie Square.

Electric tramcars were introduced in Kolkata in 1902. Tram lines were laid along Harrison Road (now MG Road) in 1903 and up Rajabazar in 1910. Now Sealdah and Rajabazar are served by Kolkata tram route no. 18 (via MG Road-Surya Sen Street-APC Road).

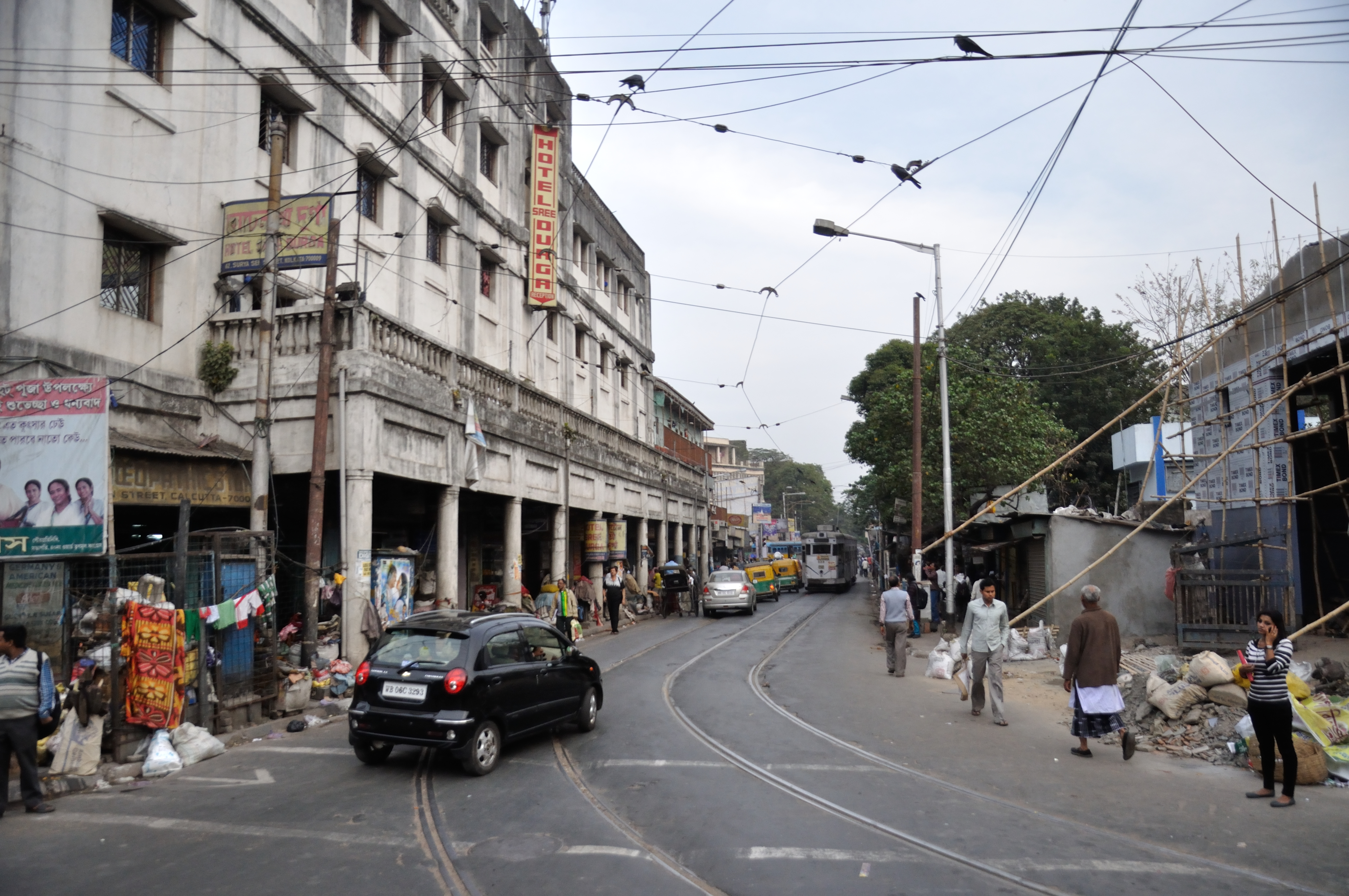
Surya Sen Street, Sealdah

Sealdah is the junction of AJC Bose Road & APC Road with MG Road via Sealdah Hump Flyover (Vidyapati Setu). Parikshit Roy Lane (Beliaghata Main Road) also starts from here. Surya Sen Street connects MG Road with APC Road, avoiding Sealdah Flyover. A large number of private and governmental public buses ply along these roads.

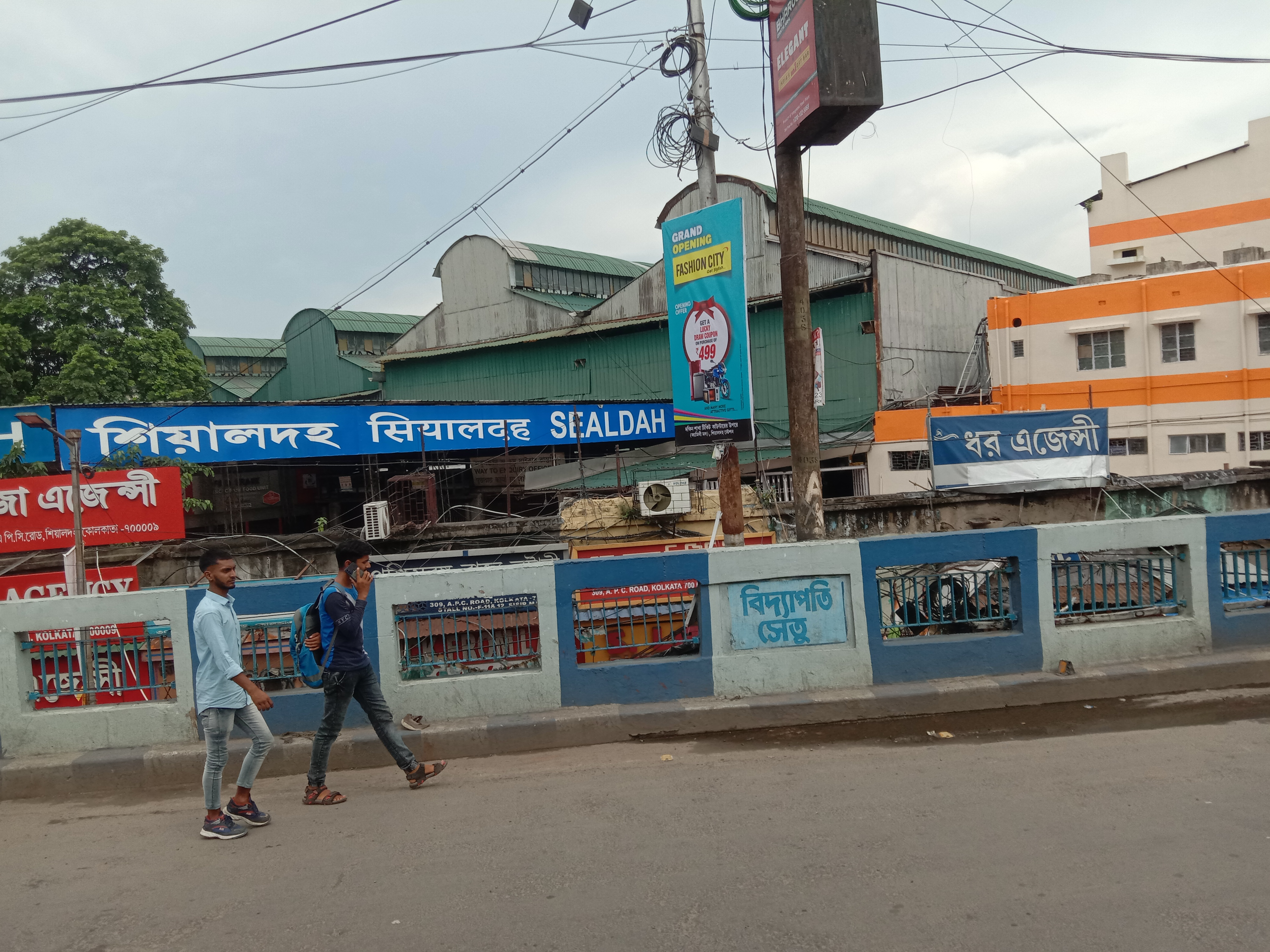
Sealdah Railway Station as seen from Vidyapati Setu

Sealdah Hump Flyover (Vidyapati Setu), constructed in the late 1970s, will have a ramp from the flyover to the station. Tram-tracks were removed and tram-service closed over Sealdah Flyover since 2019 due to excessive load on the bridge.

== Education ==
- Surendranath College, is an undergraduate college. Founded in 1884, it was initially named Ripon College after Lord Ripon, Viceroy of India. In 1948–49, it was renamed after Sir Surendranath Banerjee, who started it and was associated with this institution for many years. In 1885, it started the department of law, which became an independent college, Ripon Law College, in 1911. It opened an evening section in 1947 and a women's section in 1948, and both became independent colleges. Affiliated to the University of Calcutta, it offers honours courses in English, Bengali, political science, history, philosophy, Sanskrit, psychology, sociology, journalism & mass communication, physics, chemistry, mathematics, statistics, computer science, economics, botany, zoology, physiology, microbiology, geography, psychology and financial accounting, and general courses in arts, science and commerce.
- Surendranath Law College, initially started in 1885 as law department of Ripon College, it later became Ripon Law College and was renamed in 1948-49 after Sir Surendranath Banerjee.
- Surendranath Evening College, initially started in 1947 as evening section of Ripon College, it was separately affiliated with the University of Calcutta in 1961. It is also affiliated with Netaji Subhas Open University for certain subjects. It offers honours courses in Bengali, English, Hindi, Urdu, history, education, electronic science, physics, mathematics, accountancy and finance, and general courses in arts, science and commerce. It also offers courses in library science and a vocational course in electronic equipment maintenance. It has arrangements for certain post-graduate courses. It caters to the demands of under privileged sections of society in the area and also the working people seeking to enhance their educational qualifications.
- Surendranath College for Women was initially started in 1948 as part of Surendranath College. It initially catered to the needs of refugees from East Pakistan but later widened its base. Affiliated with the University of Calcutta, it offers honours courses in Bengali, English, Sanskrit, Urdu, history, geography, philosophy, political science, education, journalism & mass communication, economics and mathematics, and general courses. It offers a course in Communicative English.
- Bangabasi College was founded in 1887 by Acharya Girish Chandra Bose. With the large-scale influx of refugees from East Pakistan, Bangabasi College added morning and evening sections in 1947, both of which later emerged as separate colleges. A college for teaching commerce was started the same year in a separate building. In 1979, Bangabasi College became co-educational with the addition of another commerce section. Affiliated to the University of Calcutta, it offers honours courses in English, Bengali, Sanskrit, political science, history, philosophy, sociology, geography, economics, psychology, physics, chemistry, mathematics, computer science, anthropology, botany, zoology, B.Com. (Hons) and general courses in arts, science and commerce. It offers a post-graduate course in zoology.
- Bangabasi Morning College was initially started as part of Bangabasi College in 1947. It is affiliated with the University of Calcutta, and offers honours courses in Bengali, English, Hindi, history, political science, physics, chemistry, mathematics, computer science, zoology, botany, anthropology and accounting and finance, and general courses in arts, science and commerce. It has arrangements for teaching Urdu as a general subject. It offers post-graduate courses under the Directorate of Distance Education of Vidyasagar University in Bengali, English, history, environmental science, applied mathematics, chemistry and M. Com.
- Bangabasi Evening College was initially started as part of Bangabasi College in 1947. It is affiliated with the University of Calcutta, and offers honours courses in Bengali, English, Hindi, Sanskrit, history, political science, philosophy, chemistry, mathematics, anthropology, economics, physiology, botany and accountancy. It offers M.Sc. in mathematics as a regular course of the University of Calcutta.
- Acharya Girish Chandra Bose College, was started initially as a part of Bangabasi College in 1947. It was renamed Bangabasi College of Commerce and affiliated with the University of Calcutta in 1964, and in 2004 was further renamed Acharya Girish Chandra Bose College. It offers courses in B.Com. (general and honours), Bengali and English honours and B.A. (general).
- Loreto Day School at Sealdah, is an English-medium girls only school. It is one of the six Loreto schools in Kolkata. Affiliated with the West Bengal Board of Secondary Education and West Bengal Council of Higher Secondary Education, it has arrangements for teaching from Nursery to Class XII. Established in 1857, it has a ‘free’ block, built in 1932, for the economically deprived local population, inside the gate.

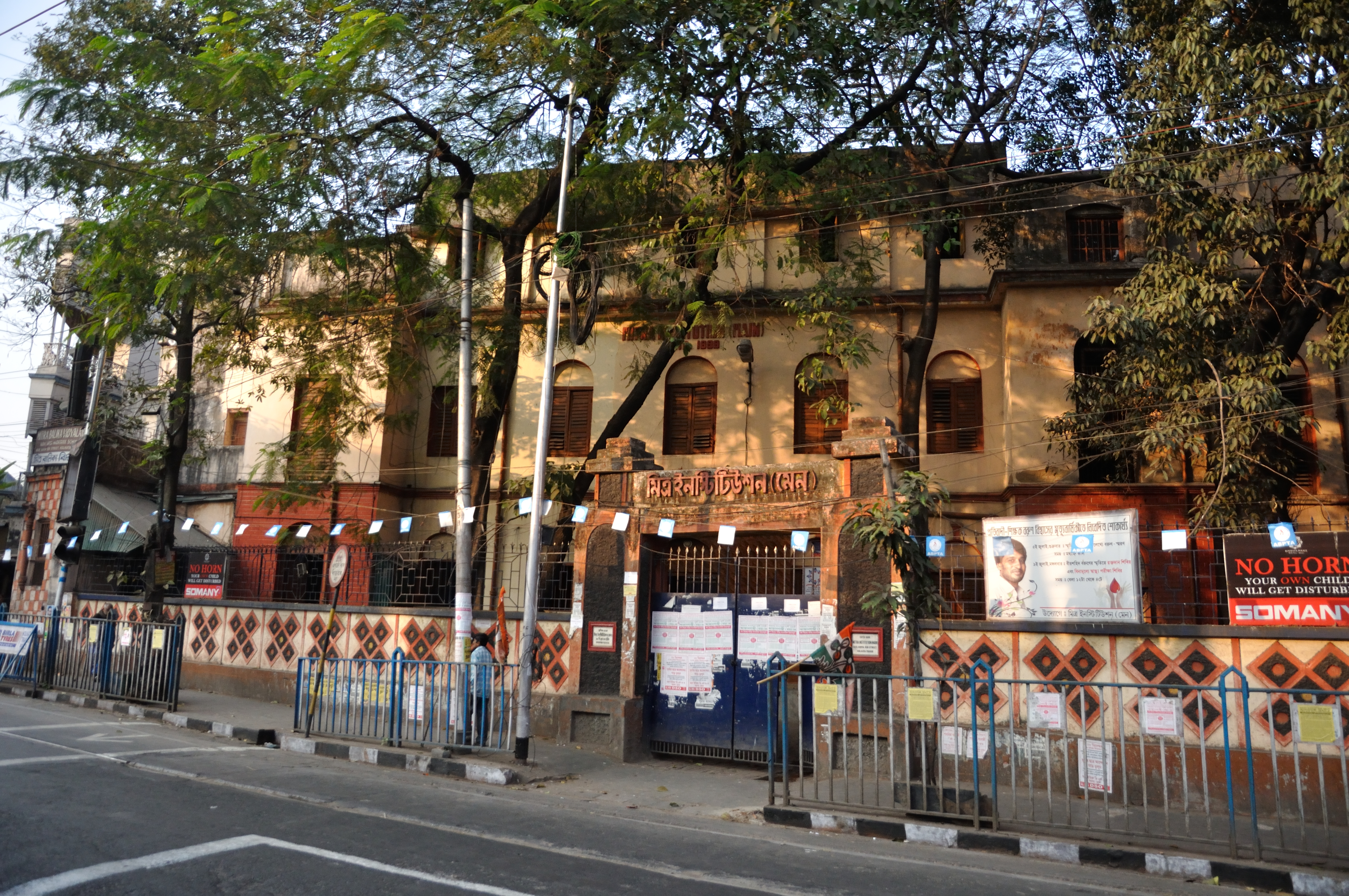
Mitra Institution (Main)

- Mitra Institution (Main) at Baithakkhana is a Bengali-medium higher secondary boys only school established in 1888. Affiliated with the West Bengal Board of Secondary Education and the West Bengal Council of Higher Secondary Education, it has arrangement for teaching from class VI to XII.

== Healthcare ==
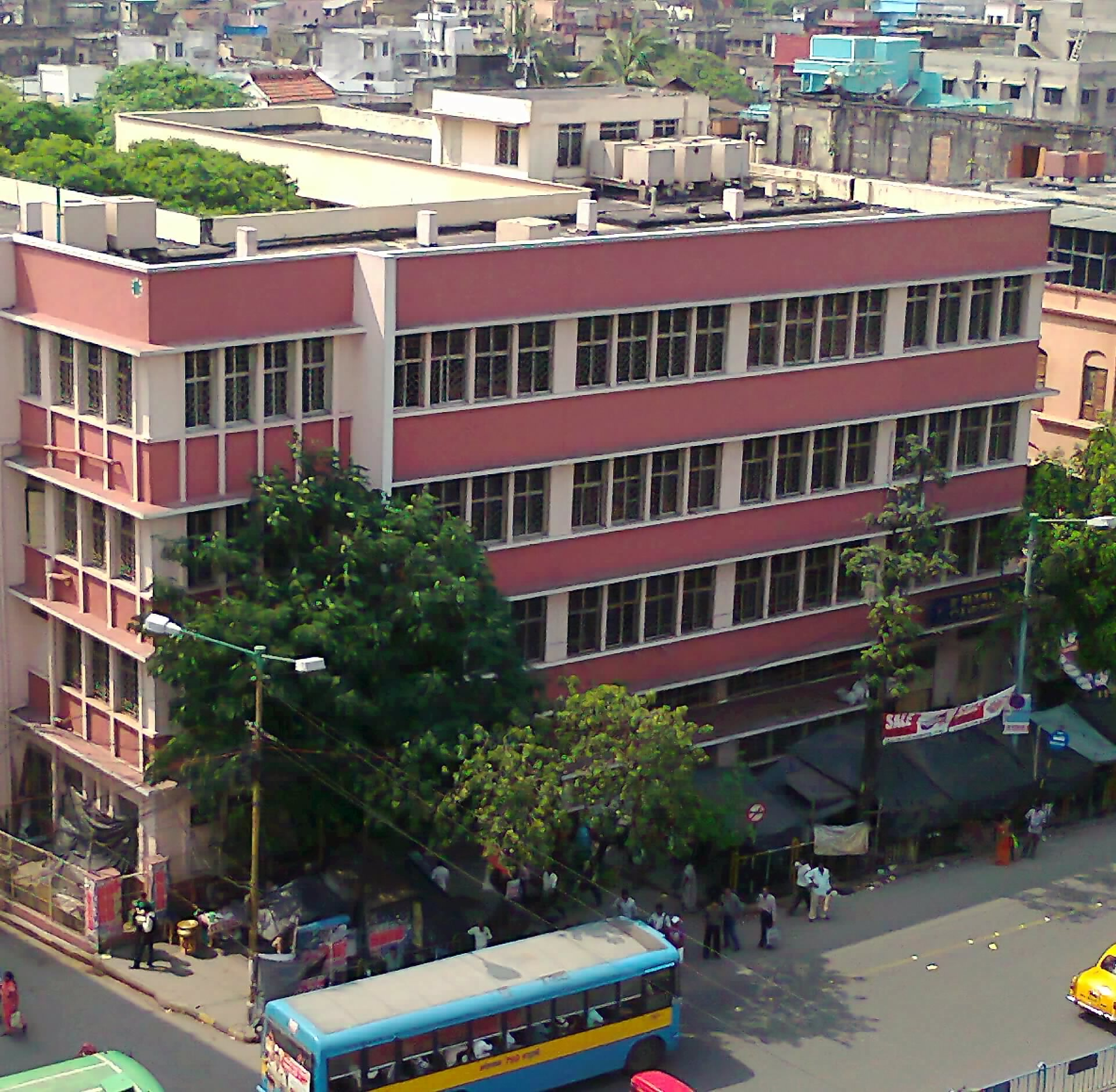
Dr. R. Ahmed Dental College and Hospital (Old Campus)

- Nil Ratan Sircar Medical College and Hospital at Sealdah is one of the five government medical colleges and hospitals in Kolkata. The medical college is affiliated with the West Bengal University of Health Sciences and offers both undergraduate and post graduate courses. The hospital has 1,890 beds. In 1789, there was an asylum for dying destitutes picked from the streets. It was called Police or Pauper Hospital. In 1874, Sealdah Medical School was set up here. In 1884, it became Campbell Medical School. Indians could be hospitalised here, because the first hospital started in Kolkata in 1709, which evolved as Presidency General Hospital, was strictly for Europeans. In 1948, it became Campbell Medical College, and in 1950 was renamed after Sir Nilratan Sircar, eminent doctor and swadeshi entrepreneur.
- B.R. Singh Hospital, set up as a small health unit in 1934, has grown to be one of the best-equipped railway hospitals in the country. It is named after Baba Ramrick Singh, first Indian Railway Agent and the then acting GM of East Bengal Railway. It has 461 beds.
- Dr. R. Ahmed Dental College and Hospital at Sealdah is the oldest dental college in India. It was founded in 1920 by Dr. Rafiuddin Ahmed, the pioneer in dentistry in the country. It was financed by starting the New York Soda Fountain in Kolkata. It was affiliated with the state medical facility in 1936, and then with the University of Calcutta in 1949. In the same year, Dr. Ahmed donated his college to the Government of West Bengal. Currently affiliated with the West Bengal University of Health Sciences and recognised by the Dental Council of India, it offers 5-year BDS, 3-year MDS and various specialised courses.

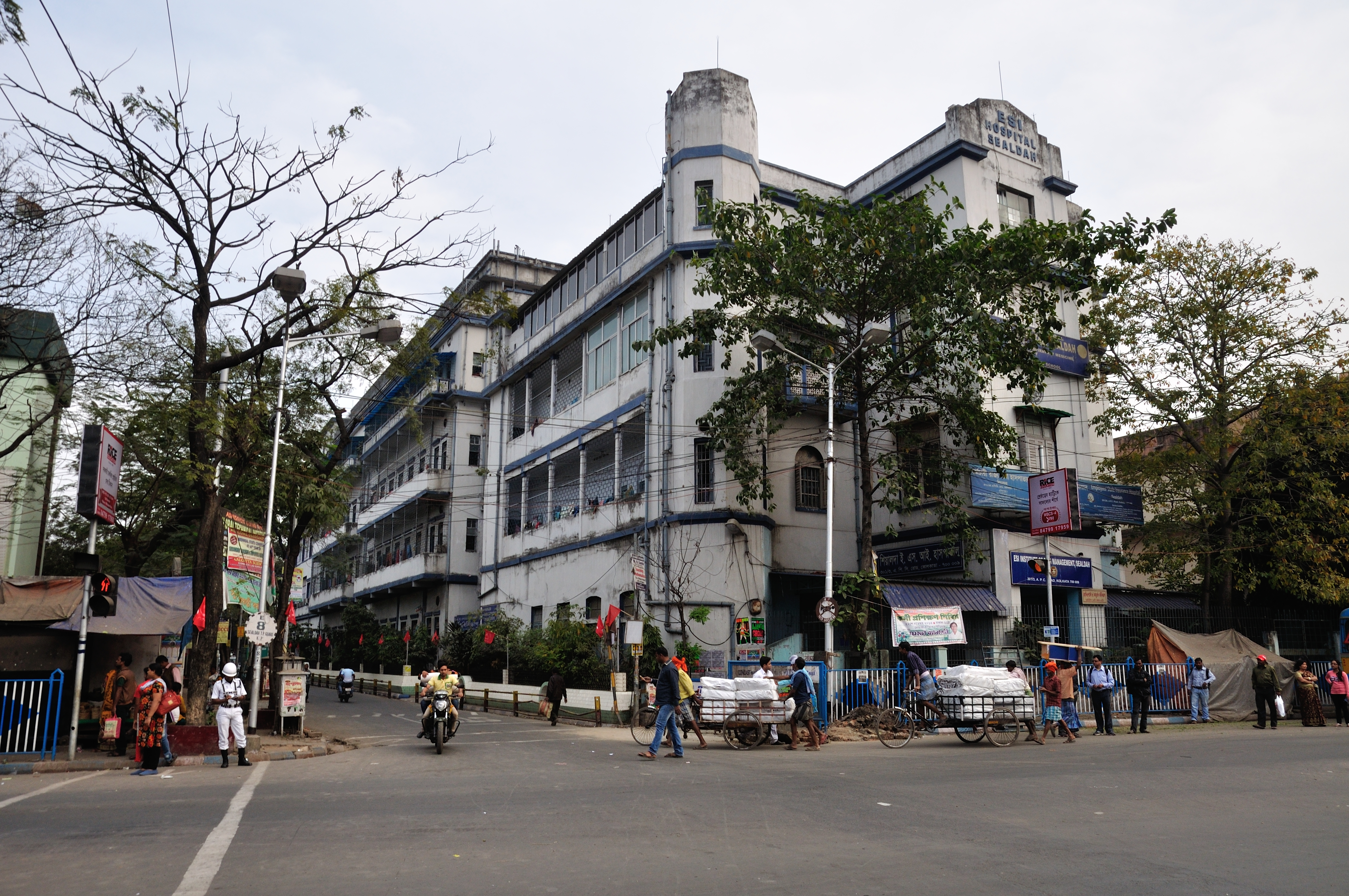
Sealdah ESI Hospital
