= Sunil Dutt (disambiguation) =

Sunil Dutt may refer to:

- Sunil Dutt (1929–2005), an Indian film actor and politician
- Sunil K. Dutt (born 1939), an Indian photographer
- Sunil Dutt (wrestler) (born 1967), an Indian wrestler
