= Surendranath Law College =

Law college of West Bengal, India

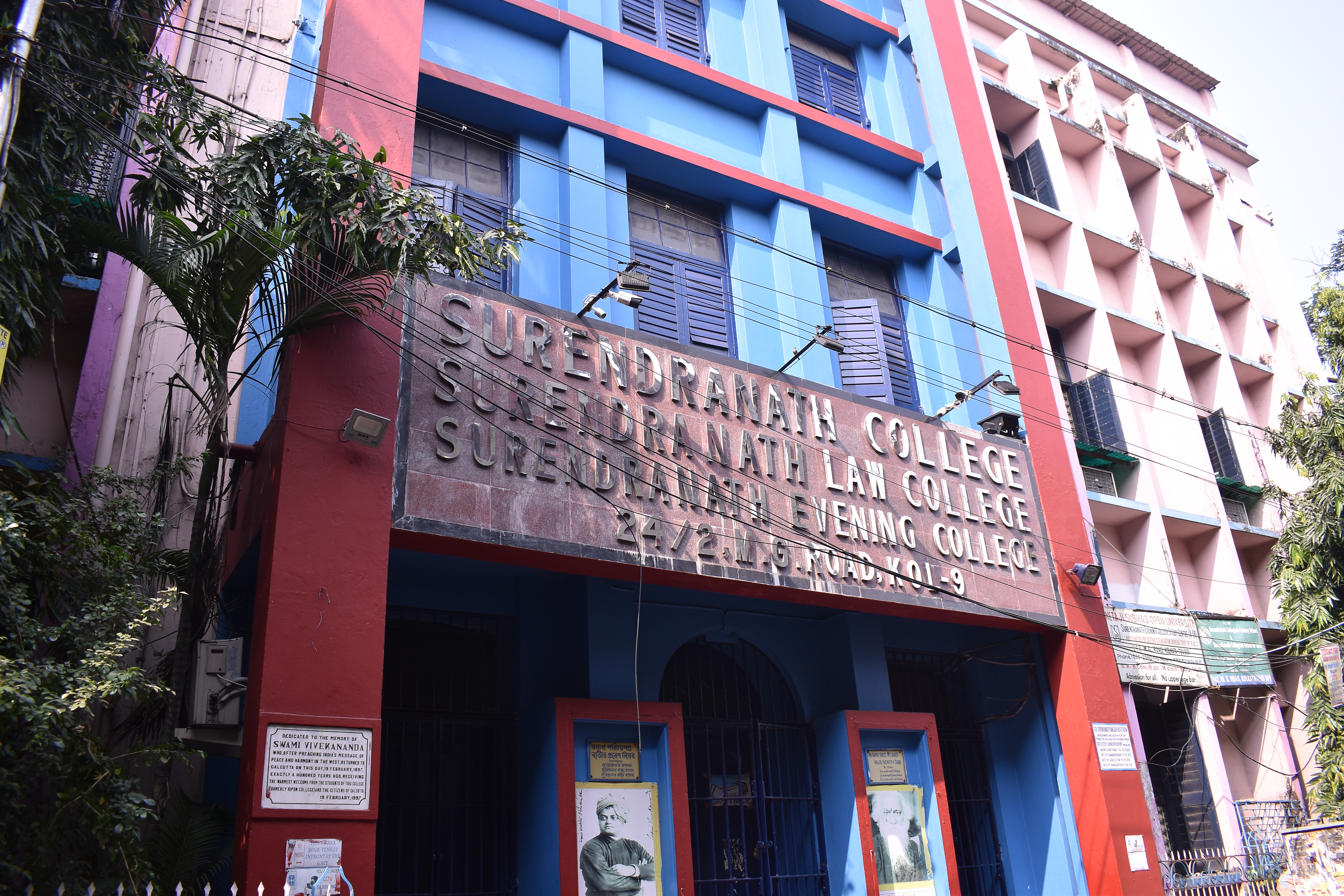
- Former names: Department of Law, Ripon College (1885–1911); Ripon Law College (1911–1947)
- Type: postgraduate Law college
- Established: 1885; 141 years ago
- Academic affiliations: University of Calcutta
- President: Dr. Supti Saha Roy
- Vice-Principal: Dr. Mohammadi Tarannum
- Location: Sealdah, Kolkata, West Bengal, India; 22.5695344°N 88.3672145°E
- Campus: Urban
- Website: snlawcollege.ac.in
- Location within Kolkata Location within India

Surendranath Law College (Bengali :সুরেন্দ্রনাথ আইন কলেজ), formerly Ripon College, is an postgraduate law college affiliated with the University of Calcutta. It was established in Kolkata in the Indian state of West Bengal in 1885 by a trust formed by the nationalist leader, scholar and educationist Surendranath Banerjee, a year after he founded Surendranath College. This is now regarded the third oldest Law college of British India.

== History ==
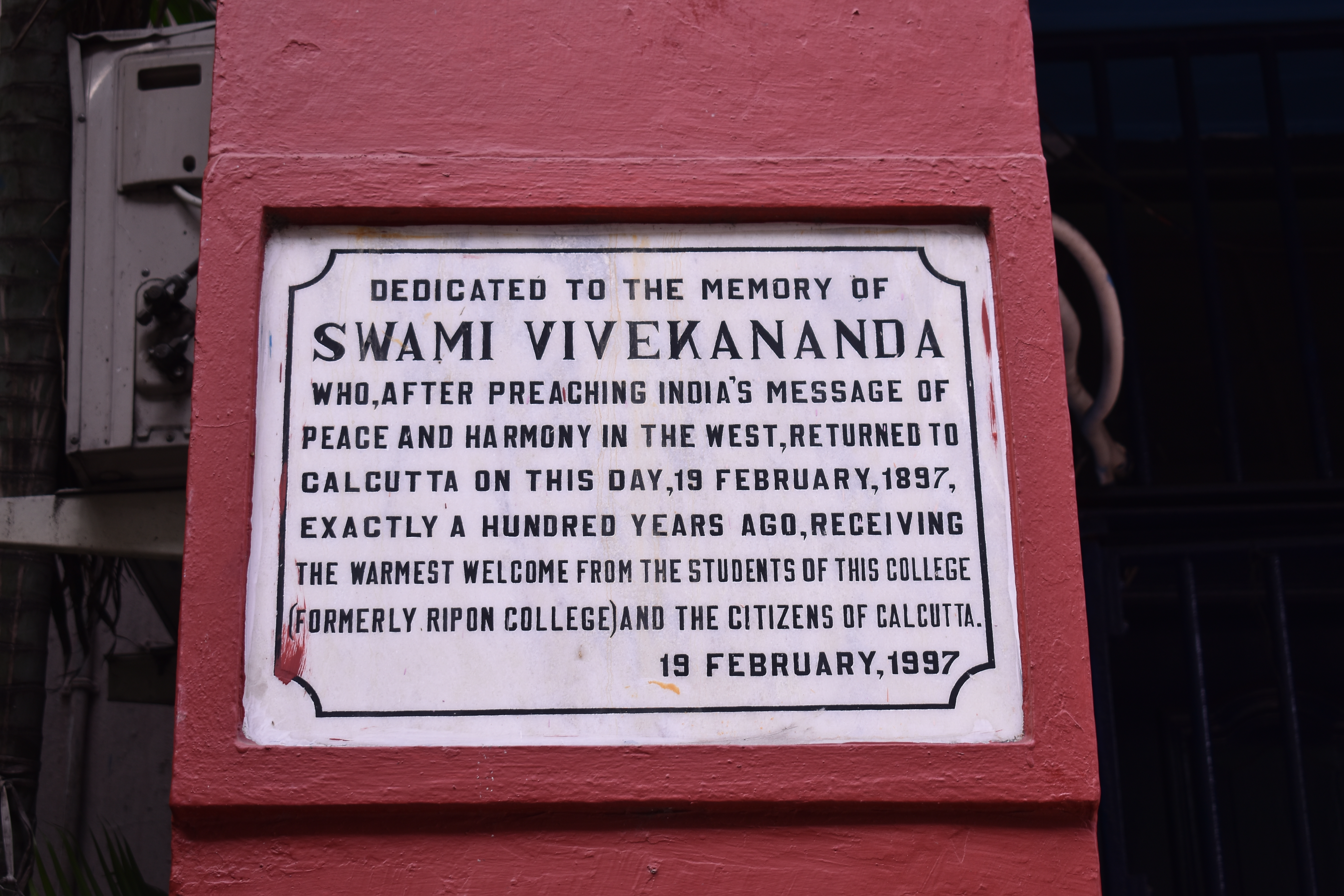
Commemorative plaque honoring Swami Vivekananda in the college

The first name of the college was Presidency School in 1882, when it was handed over to Sri Banerjee on 1 January 1884. That same year the Post-Graduate Department of Law was extended, and it was affiliated to the Calcutta University as an independent professional college in 1885. Banerjee renamed the school the Presidency Institution and brought it to the status of a college affiliated to the F.A. standard. The name was later changed to Ripon College, named after the British Viceroy George Robinson, 1st Marquess of Ripon. The name was changed again in 1949 to honour its founder Sri Surendranath Banerjee. The women's section of the college was founded in 1931 by Mira Datta Gupta, its first principal. Swami Vivekananda delivered his first address in Calcutta from the rostrum of this college on his return from Chicago after his famous deliverance at the Parliament of the World's Religions in Chicago in 1893. In 1911, Rabindranath Tagore read out at this college one of his essays dealing with the twin subjects of separatism to be found among many of countrymen and national integration. This college was recognised by the University Grants Commission in 1972. The college now offers LLM courses.

== Notable alumni ==
- Dr. Rajendra Prasad - The first President of India.
- Harendra Coomar Mookerjee - The first Governor of West Bengal.
- Sir Bijan Kumar Mukherjea - The first Bengali Chief Justice of the Supreme Court of India.
- Birendranath Sasmal - Nationalist barrister and politician.
- Manmatha Nath Mukherjee - Judge, Calcutta High Court and Bengali jurist
- Mohammad Mohammadullah - President of Bangladesh
- Panchanan Barma - Social reformer
- Basanta Kumar Das - Pakistani federal minister.
- Dhirendranath Datta - Indian Freedom fighter and Bangladeshi activist.
- Khondakar Abu Taleb - Bangladeshi journalist and Martyr
- Shahidullah Kaiser - Bengali intellectual and Martyr
- Phani Bhushan Majumder - Former minister of Bangladesh
- Rabin Deb - Bengali politician
- Golam Rahman (writer) - Bengali writer
- Aniruddha Bose - Judge of the Supreme Court of India
- Abdul Matin Chaudhury (1895-1948) - Muslim league politician
- Mosharraf Hossain - Member of Constituent Assembly of Bangladesh, founding vice-president of JASAD.
- Ishaa Saha, actress

== See also ==
- Surendranath College
- Surendranath Evening College
- Surendranath College for Women
- List of colleges affiliated to the University of Calcutta
- Education in West Bengal
