= Golam Rahman (writer) =

Bangladeshi journalist and writer

- Born: November 28, 1931; Kolkata, British India
- Died: January 12, 1972 (aged 40); Dhaka, Bangladesh
- Cause of death: Murder
- Occupations: Writer, journalist
- Known for: Children's literature, journalism
- Awards: Bangla Academy Literary Award, 1969

Golam Rahman was a Bangladeshi journalist and writer. He was awarded Bangla Academy Literary Award for his contribution to Bengali literature.

== Early life ==
Rahman was born on 28 November 1931 in Kolkata, West Bengal, British India. He studied law at Surendranath Law College but moved to Dhaka following the Partition of India and as a result could not finish his studies. He joined Jagannath College but dropped out before graduation.

== Career ==
Rahman worked at Daily Ittehad and Daily Insaf while leaving in Kolkata. He edited the Madhumala, a weekly. He was elected Assistant Secretary of the East Pakistan Journalists' Union. His novel, Golam Rahman Rachanabali, was published by Bangla Academy. He was awarded Bangla Academy Literary Award in 1969.

== Bibliography ==
- Rakamfer (1953)
- Panur Pathshala (1953)
- Badi Niye Badabadi (1957)
- Buddhir Dhenki (1958)
- Chakmaki (1960)
- Jyanta Chhabir Bhojbaji (1960)
- Russ Desher Rupkatha (1960)
- Ishaper Galpa (1966)
- Neta O Rani (1954)
- Amader Bir Sangrami (1970)

== Death ==
Rahman was murdered on 13 January 1972 shortly after the Independence of Bangladesh.
