= The Bengalee =

British Indian newspaper

The Bengalee was an English language newspaper based in Calcutta (Kolkata), British India.

== History ==
The Bengalee was founded in 1862 by Girish Chandra Ghosh as an English language newspaper based in Kolkata. The newspaper had a nationalist editorial stand. Surendranath Banerjee served as its editor. It was the highest circulated weekly newspaper in the late 19th and early 20th century. Following the Surat Split in the Indian National Congress, the newspaper took a stand for the moderate fraction of the Congress. The paper adapted moderate policies on movements like the Swadeshi movement which reduced circulation and decreased the popularity of the newspaper. The newspaper circulation further declined following the death of Surendranath Banerjee in 1925. The newspaper developed into two editions, the morning edition was called The Bengalee, which was for metropolitan area, while the evening edition for rural areas was called Calcutta Evening News in 1931. The Bengalee newspaper closed down that year. In 1932, the two editions were consolidated and renamed The Star of India.
