= Ramendra Sundar Tribedi =

Bengali author (1864–1919)

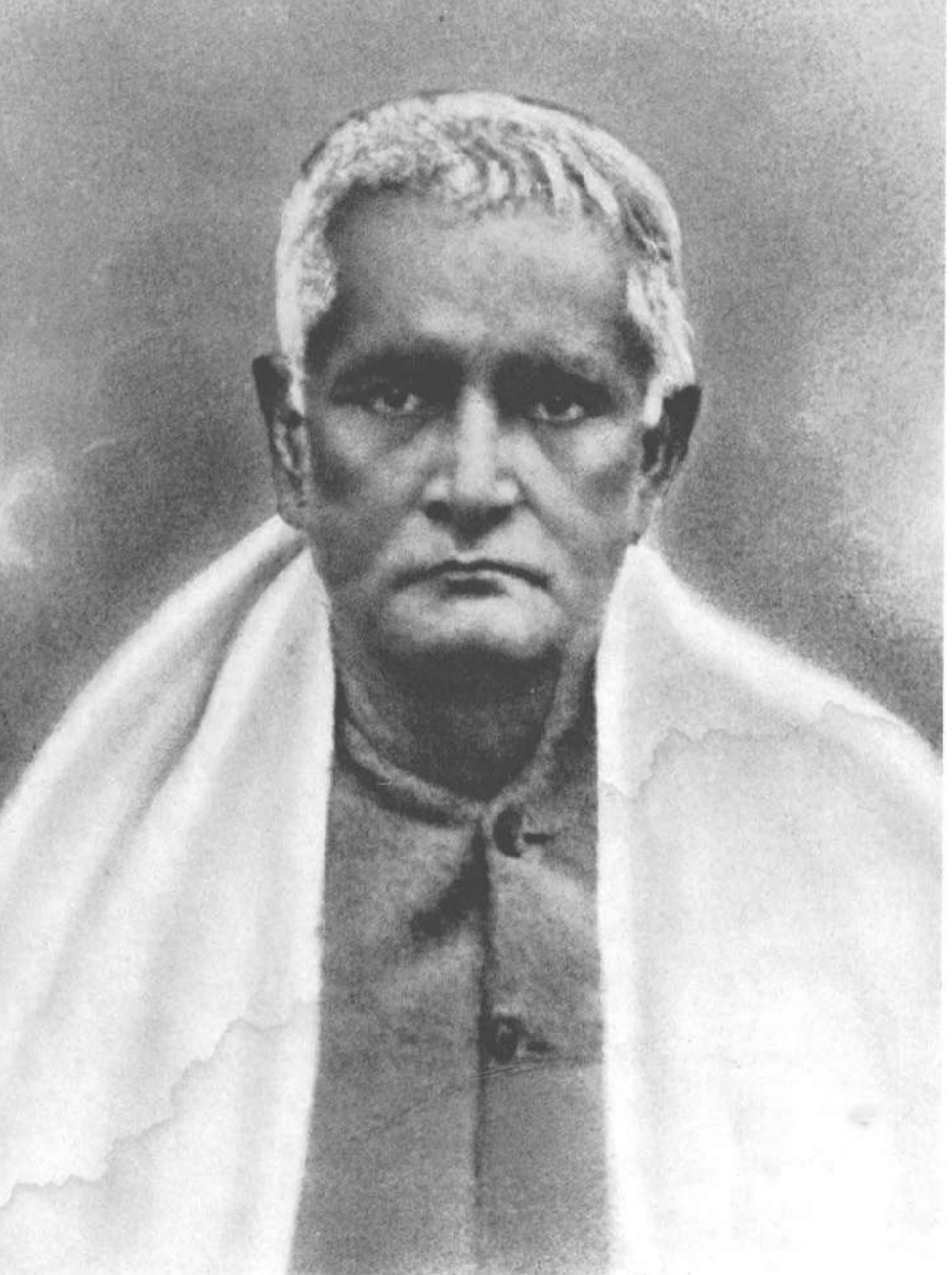
- Born: 22 August 1864; Kandi, Murshidabad, Bengal Presidency, British India (now Murshidabad district, West Bengal, India)
- Died: 6 June 1919 (aged 54); Calcutta, Bengal Presidency, British India (Kolkata, West Bengal, India)
- Education: Ripon College, Kolkata
- Occupations: Author, Teacher

Ramendra Sundar Tribedi (22 August 1864 – 6 June 1919) was a Bengali writer. He is known for his works in Bengali poems, and stories. He is one of the most popular poets of India.

== Life ==
Ramendra Sundar Tribedi was born at Kandi, Murshidabad in West Bengal on 22 August 1864. His father's name was Govindasundar and his mother's name was Chandra Kamini. From his childhood, Tribedi was a successful student. After obtaining his B.Sc. degree (coming first in the exams), he won the prestigious Premchand Roychand Scholarship in 1888 with physics and chemistry as his subjects. The examiners' report said:

"The candidate who took up Chemistry and Physics appears to be about the best student who has yet taken up these subjects for the examination and on this account deserves recognition."

Tribedi was a teacher at and, later, the principal of the Ripon College as well as Surendranath Law College of Kolkata.

Ramendra Sundar Trivedi died on 6 June 1919 at Kolkata in West Bengal.

== Writing career ==
Ramendra Sundar was a polymath who wrote on a host of themes, including popular science and the philosophy of science. His first articles appeared in the periodical 'Navajiban'.

His contribution to the functioning and development of the Bangiya Sahitya Parishad is considered to be momentous.

In Bengal, Ramendra Sundar's fame rests mostly on his popular science essays. As a popular science writer, Ramendra's commitment seems to have been "to share with everyone else the fun, the delight and ecstasy of science (in Ramendra's case, the themes and findings of modern western science). This could only be achieved by dissolving the alien terms and themes in an indigenous, flexible, and comprehensible linguistic medium. Thus, when creating scientific terms, Ramendra took care to select words which were sweet sounding and easily pronounced, drew examples from mythology, folklore and local traditions..., cemented his prose with humour, lined his comments with mild irony and talked of the gravest things with his tongue in his cheek. In this witty, sly, sceptical, gay and eminently human vein, he dragged science, epistemology and philosophy into the midst of a Bengali adda and domesticated them on the couch of a bhadralok's drawing room."

=== Books ===
- Prakriti [Collected essays on philosophy ]
- Jigmasa [Collected essays on science ]
- Charit-Katha [Collected essays and lectures on few eminent personalities in Bengali literature]
- Bichitra Prasanga
- Bangalakshmir Bratakatha
- Bangla Sahityer Itihas [Vol- Adhunik Jug, Page 111] By Dr. Debesh Kumar Acharya

== Honours ==
The Ramendra Sundar Tribedi Setu over the river Bhāgirathi-Hooghly is named after him. This bridge connects Baharampur and Khagraghat in Murshidabad district of West Bengal by NH 12 (previously NH 34).
