= Surendranath Banerjee =

Indian nationalist leader (1848–1925)

Rashtraguru Sir Surendranath Banerjee
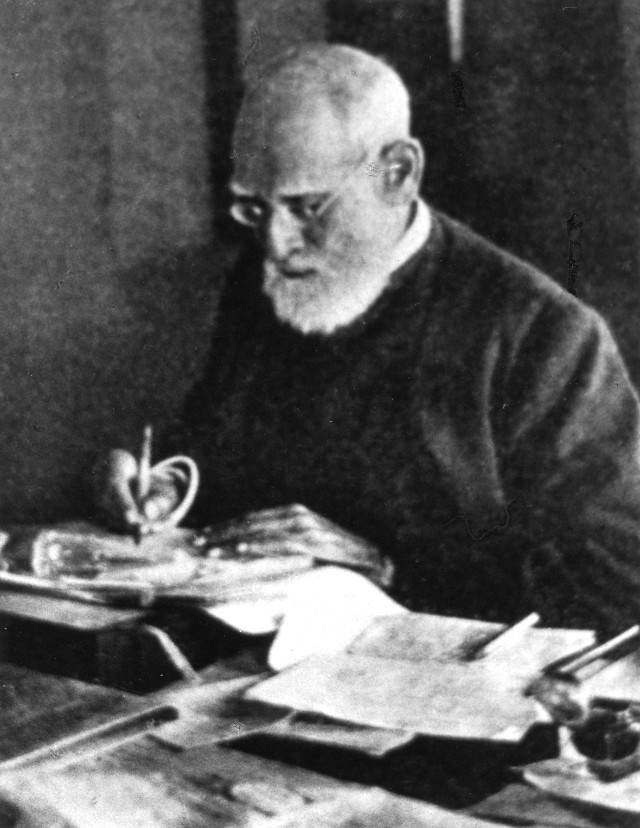
- S. N. Banerjee

11th President of the Indian National Congress
- In office 1895–1896
- Preceded by: Alfred Webb
- Succeeded by: Rahimtulla M. Sayani; Lalmohan Ghosh

Member of Bengal Legislative Council
- In office 1921 ‍–‍ 1923
- Preceded by: Post established
- Succeeded by: Bidhan Chandra Roy
- Constituency: Barrackpore (Note: The constituency is officially recorded as 24 Parganas North Municipal (unreserved) centered at Barrackpore, then 24 Parganas.)

Personal details
- Born: 10 November 1848 Calcutta, Bengal Presidency, British India
- Died: 6 August 1925 (aged 76) Barrackpore, Bengal Presidency, British India
- Party: Indian National Congress (1883–1919); Indian National Liberation Federation (1919–1925)
- Education: University of Calcutta; University College London; Middle Temple
- Occupation: Academic; politician
- Known for: Founder of Indian Liberation Federation, Indian National Association, Co-founder of Indian National Congress
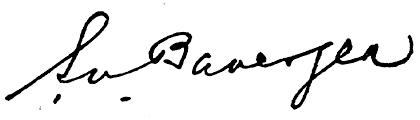
- Signature

Sir Surendranath Banerjee (10 November 1848 – 6 August 1925), often known as Rashtraguru (lit. 'Teacher of the Nation'), was an Indian nationalist leader during the British Raj. He founded the Indian National Association to bring Hindus and Muslims together for political action. He was also one of the founding members of the Indian National Congress. Unlike Congress, however, Surendranath supported Montagu–Chelmsford Reforms, and with many liberal leaders he left Congress and founded a new organisation, Indian National Liberation Federation, in 1919.

== Early life ==
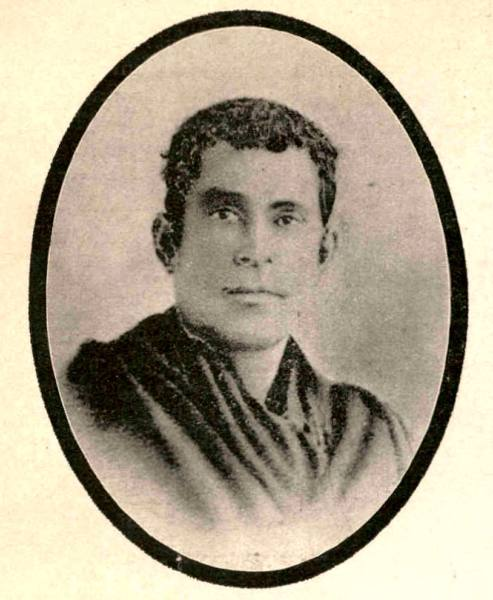
Dr Durga Charan Banerjee

Surendranath Banerjee was born in Calcutta, in the province of Bengal to a Rarhi Kulin Brahmin family, suggesting that the ancestral seat of the family was at Rarh region of present-day West Bengal. His great-grandfather Babu Gour Kishire Banerjee emigrated and settled in a village called Monirampur near Barrackpore. He was deeply influenced in liberal, progressive thinking by his father Durga Charan Banerjee, a doctor. After graduating from the University of Calcutta, he travelled to England in 1868, along with Romesh Chunder Dutt and Behari Lal Gupta, to compete in the Indian Civil Service examinations. He cleared the competitive examination in 1869, but was barred owing to a claim he had misrepresented his age. After clearing the matter in the courts by arguing that he calculated his age according to the Hindu custom of reckoning age from the date of conception rather than from birth, Banerjee cleared the exam again in 1871 and was posted as assistant magistrate in Sylhet. Banerjee also attended classes at University College London. He took his final exams in 1871 and returned to India in August 1871. In 1874, Banerjee returned to London and became a student at the Middle Temple.

Banerjee was soon dismissed for making a serious judicial error. He went to England to appeal his discharge, but was unsuccessful because, he felt, of racial discrimination. He would return to India bitter and disillusioned with the British. During his stay in England (1874–1875), he studied the works of Edmund Burke and other liberal philosophers. These works guided him in his protests against the British. He was known as the Indian Burke. For his tenacity he was called 'Surrender Not Banerjee' by the British.

Surendranath was influenced by the writings of Italian nationalist Giuseppe Mazzini. He studied the writings of Mazzini in his stay in England (1874–1875) on Anandmohan's suggestion.

== Political career ==
Upon his return to India in June 1875, Banerjee became an English professor at the Metropolitan Institution, the Free Church Institution and at the Rippon College, now Surendranath College, founded by him in 1882 and he inspired his students with a new spirit of nascent Indian nationalism. Among the most prominent of the students that he inspired was Birendranath Sasmal. He began delivering public speeches on nationalist and liberal political subjects, as well as Indian history. He founded the Indian National Association with Anandamohan Bose, one of the earliest Indian political organizations of its kind, on 26 July 1876. In 1878 in a meeting to preach the Indian people he said 'The great doctrine of peace and goodwill between Hindus and Muslims, Christians and Paresees, aye between all sections of our country's progress. Let the word "Unity" be inscribed therein characters of glittering gold... There may be religious difference between us. There may be social difference between us. But there is a common platform where we may all meet, the platform of our country's welfare'. He used the organization to tackle the issue of the age-limit for Indian students appearing for ICS examinations. He condemned discrimination against Indians under colonial rule through speeches all over the country, which made him very popular.

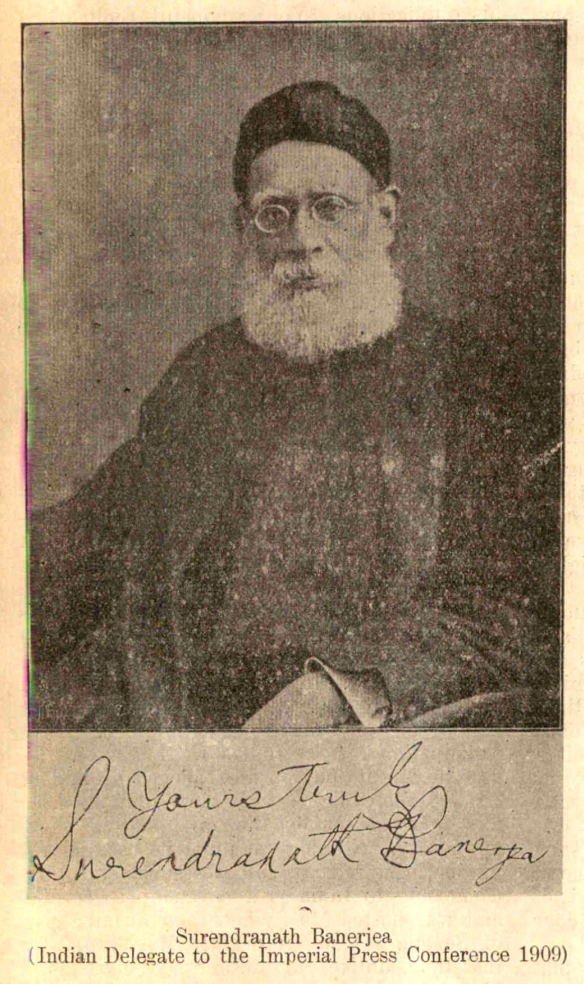
Banerjee in 1909

In 1879, he bought the newspaper The Bengalee (founded in 1862 by Girish Chandra Ghosh) and edited it for 40 years. In 1883, when Banerjee was arrested for publishing remarks in his paper, in contempt of court, protests and hartals erupted across Bengal, and in Indian cities such as Agra, Faizabad, Amritsar, Lahore and Pune. He became the first Indian journalist to be imprisoned. The INC expanded considerably, and hundreds of delegates from across India came to attend its annual conference in Calcutta. After the founding of the Indian National Congress in 1885 in Bombay, Banerjee merged his organization with it owing to their common objectives and memberships in 1886. He was elected the Congress President in 1895 at Poona and in 1902 at Ahmedabad.

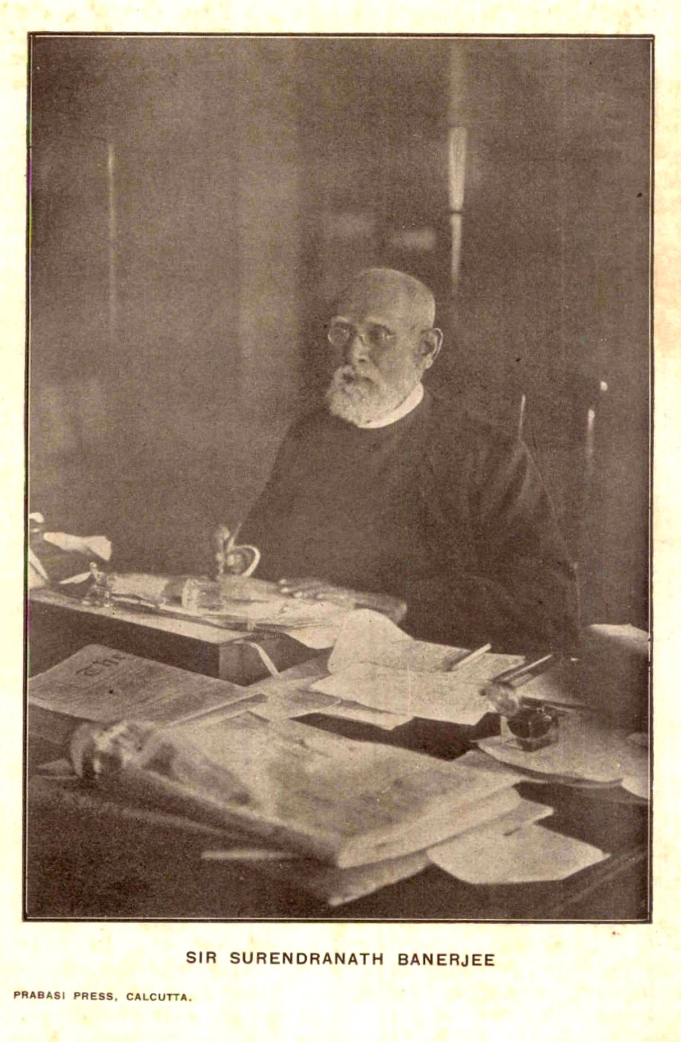
Bannerjee in 1925

Surendranath was one of the most important public leaders who protested the partition of the Bengal province in 1905. Banerjee was in the forefront of the movement and organized protests, petitions and extensive public support across Bengal and India, which finally compelled the British to reverse the bifurcation of Bengal in 1912. Banerjee became the patron of rising Indian leaders like Gopal Krishna Gokhale and Sarojini Naidu. Banerjee was also one of the senior-most leaders of the moderate Congress – those who favoured accommodation and dialogue with the British – after the "extremists" — those who advocated revolution and political independence – led by Bal Gangadhar Tilak left the party in 1906. Banerjee was an important figure in the Swadeshi movement – advocating goods manufactured in India against foreign products – and his popularity at its apex made him, in words of admirers, the "uncrowned king" of Bengal.

== Later career ==
The declining popularity of moderate Indian politicians affected Banerjee's role in Indian politics. Banerjee supported the Morley-Minto reforms 1909 – which were resented and ridiculed as insufficient and meaningless by the vast majority of the Indian public and nationalist politicians. Though Banerjee was a critic of the proposed method of civil disobedience advocated by Mahatma Gandhi, he added that he "admire[d] the supreme solicitude and the earnest efforts of Mr. Gandhi to secure Hindu-Muslim unity". Surendranath Banerjee, a moderate and veteran leader of Congress were in favour to accept the Montagu-Chelmsford Reforms. They left the Congress and founded Indian Liberation Federation. They were termed as Liberals and they lost their relevance in Indian National Movement thereafter. Accepting the portfolio of minister in the Bengal government earned him the ire of nationalists and much of the public, and he lost the election to the Bengal Legislative Assembly in 1923 to Bidhan Chandra Roy, the candidate of the Swarajya Party — ending his political career for all practical purposes. He was knighted for his political support of the British Empire. Banerjee made the Calcutta Municipal Corporation a more democratic body while serving as a minister in the Bengal government.

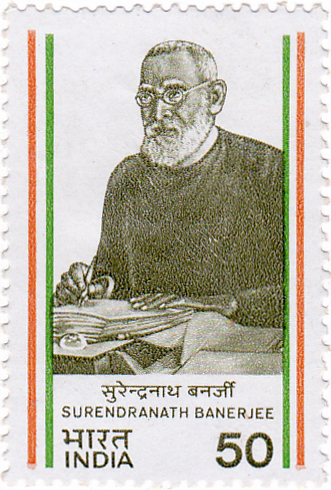
Banerjee on a 1983 stamp of India

He is remembered and widely respected today as a pioneer leader of Indian politics – for being among the first treading the path for Indian political empowerment. But nationalist politics in India meant opposition, and increasingly there were others whose opposition was more vigorous and who came to center stage. Banerjee could accept neither the extremist view of political action nor the non-cooperation of Gandhi, then emerging as a major factor in the nationalist movement. Banerjee saw the Montagu–Chelmsford Reforms of 1919 as substantially fulfilling Congress's demands, a position which further isolated him. He was elected to the reformed Legislative Council of Bengal in 1921, knighted in the same year and held office as minister for local self-government from 1921 to 1924. His defeat at the polls in 1923 brought his political career to a close and he went on to write the widely acclaimed A Nation in Making, published in 1925. He died at Barrackpore on 6 August 1925.

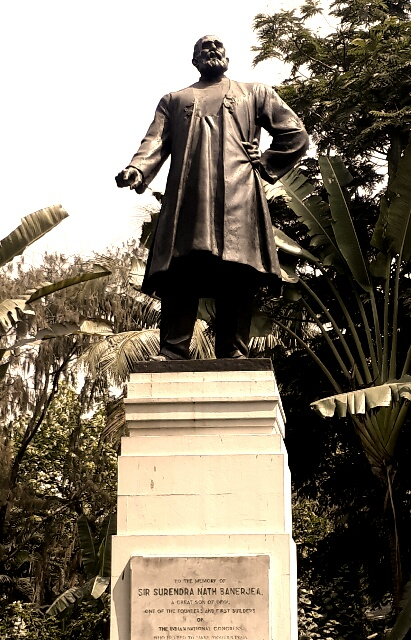
Statue of Surendranath Banerjee

== Commemoration ==
His name is commemorated in the names of the following institutions: Barrackpore Rastraguru Surendranath College, Raiganj Surendranath Mahavidyalaya, Surendranath College, Surendranath College for Women, Surendranath Evening College, Surendranath Law College (formerly Ripon College) and the Surendranath Centenary School in Ranchi and the Surendranath Banerjee Road (popularly known as S. N. Banerjee Road).
