= Surendranath College for Women =

College in Kolkata, West Bengal, India

- Type: Undergraduate college
- Established: 1948; 78 years ago
- Affiliations: University of Calcutta
- President: Dr. Uday Shankar Hazra
- Principal: Dr. Purnima Biswas Mookherjee
- Location: 24/2, MG Road, Baithakkhana, Sealdah, Kolkata, West Bengal, 700009, India; 22.5705807°N 88.368251°E
- Campus: Urban
- Website: www.sncwcal.ac.in

- Location within Kolkata Location within India

Surendranath College for Women, established in 1948, is an undergraduate women's college in Sealdah, Kolkata, West Bengal, India. It is affiliated with the University of Calcutta. The college is recognized by the University Grants Commission (UGC).

== Departments ==
The following courses are offered here:

=== Science ===
- Mathematics
- Statistics (General)

=== Arts and Commerce ===
- Bengali (Hons)
- English (Hons)
- Sanskrit (Hons)
- Hindi (General)
- Urdu
- History
- Geography
- Political Science
- Philosophy
- Economics
- Education
- Sociology (General)
- Journalism and Mass Communication (Hons)
- Communicative English (Major)
- Commerce (Hons)

== Alumni ==
Every year, customarily on the last working day before Christmas, the graduated classes of the college are welcomed for a get-together and apart from the festivities they are additionally engaged with placing their input for advancement of different offices in the college.

== See also ==
- Surendranath Evening College
- Surendranath Law College
- Surendranath College
- List of colleges affiliated to the University of Calcutta
- Education in India
- Education in West Bengal
