= Sunil K. Dutt =

Indian photographer

- Born: 31 December 1939 (age 86); Kolkata, India
- Education: Surendranath College
- Occupation: Photographer

Sunil K. Dutt (born 31 December 1939) is an Indian photographer and photojournalist.

Dutt is known as the photo chronicler of Mother Teresa's life and work for more than thirty years till her death in 1997. He is also known as a chronicler of Calcutta and its many moods for his vignettes of life in Kolkata, India. His photographs have been published in many newspapers, magazines and journals, and he has received many national and international awards. Sunil K. Dutt has been in the field of photography and photojournalism for more than fifty years.

== Early life and education ==
Sunil K. Dutt was born in Kolkata on 31 December 1939. He was greatly inspired by Swami Vivekananda. His words "When you are born a man, leave some indelible mark behind you", always haunted him. After completing his studies from Surendranath College, Kolkata, he started writing articles for various magazines.

== Career ==
Dutt never planned of having a career in the field of photography at first. When he was writing in Dr. Karuna Mukherjee's magazine Gharani', he was advised to give visual support to his writings to make the subjects more attractive. That was the starting point of his journey with photography. He started to take photographs to make his articles more attractive and later he chose it as his career and started working as a professional photographer for the rest of his life. At the early stage of his career as a photographer, he was appointed to take Mother Teresa's photographs by the editor of Junior Statesman., published from Kolkata, Desmond Doig, the writer of Calcutta: An Artist's Impression, Mother Teresa: Her People and Her Work and many more books. This assignment was the turning point of Dutt's career.

By the end of the 1960s, a documentary was made on Mother Teresa, and in the early 1970s, the first ever book on her, Something Beautiful for God was published by Harper Collins (based on the documentary). It was written and undertaken by Malcolm Muggeridge with the photographs of Mother Teresa snapped by Sunil K. Dutt. Dutt's pictorial book titled Kolkata Canvas portrays the life of Kolkata. It has more than 100 photographs on various aspects of city and its reality. Dutt's other pictorial books are Robir Aloy Alokchitro, Durga Puja, Amay Gach Kore Dao, Shantiniketan, Mother Teresa - Down Memory Lane.

== Major exhibitions ==
- 2018 A Walk in Time - An exhibition of Sunil K. Dutt's iconic black and white photographs of the city of Kolkata and the life of Saint Teresa. This exhibition was organised by Abundant Art Gallery and Maya Art Space in Kolkata. ( Walk in time )
- 2016 Ray and the City – Photography (Black and white) by Sunil K. Dutt at Victoria Memorial Hall, Kolkata
- 2016 Mother Teresa - photography (Black and white) by Sunil Dutt at Savio Hall at Shillong
- 2015 Rabir Aloye Alokchitra (Photographs in the Light of Tagore's most popular songs and poems) - Gaganendra Pradarshashala, Kolkata
- 2011 Mother Teresa – Victoria Memorial Hall, Kolkata
- 2006 Best of Sunil's photographs - Kolkata International Foundation of Art, Literature and Culture, Kolkata
- 2001 Heritage sites of West Bengal – Prinsep Ghat, Kolkata
- 2000 On the State of Tripura – Gaganendra Pradarshashala, Kolkata
- 2000 Heritage Awareness - Gaganendra Pradarshashala, Kolkata
- 1995 On 305th year of Calcutta– Oxford Bookstore And Gallery, Kolkata
- 1995 On Santiniketan – Gaganendra Pradarshashala, Kolkata
- 1989 Calcutta – National Museum of Photography Film and Television Television, Bradford, London .
- 1987 On Calcutta – Birla Academy of Art and Culture, Kolkata.
- 1981 On Awareness of Spastic Children – Academy of Fine Arts, Kolkata
- 1973 Calcutta Calcutta - Alliance française, French Government Consulate, Kolkata

== Various other activities related to photography ==
- Taught as visiting faculty in different institutions and universities. Some of them are University of Calcutta, Visvabharati, Satyajit Ray Film and Television Institute (SRFTI) etc.
- Worked as an honorary photo-selector for years together for major national newspapers and magazines.
- 1989 Gave a lecture about the state and status of Indian Photography (1989) at British National Museum of Photography.
- 1997 Participated ACCU (an affiliated body of UNESCO) at Tokyo – an interactive sessions on Indian photography.
- Chaired as a judge in ACCU competition for whole of Asia and Australasia.

== Awards and recognition ==
- Christopher Award from New York (1971)
- 1988 Certificate of recognition from World Health Organization, Zeneva
- 1988 The Japan Airlines Prize for the photograph entitled Old Traditional Bengali Life Style in the 13th Asia and the Pacific 1988 Photo Contest organized by The Asian Cultural Centre for UNESCO
- 1987 Fuji Film Prize for the photograph entitled Elephant Market in the 12th Asia and the Pacific 1987 Photo Contest organized by The Asian Cultural Centre for UNESCO
- 1987 Selected Dutt as one of the ten "best photojournalists of the world" by Photographic Society of America.
- 1985 The Ito Ryoji Memorial Prize for the photograph entitled Even now so happy in the 10th Asia and the Pacific 1985 Photo Contest organized by The Asian Cultural Centre for UNESCO, Tokyo
- 1974 Awarded in the category of Humour in the All India Photo Competition
- 1972 Awarded in the category Human Interest in Press Institute of India Photography Award in collaboration with The Deccan Herald and Prajavani group of newspapers
- 1971 Awarded in the category of Photo Features in Press Institute of India Photography Award in collaboration with The Deccan Herald and Prajavani group of newspapers.

== Pictorial books ==
- 2015 Robir Aloy Alokchitro - popular songs & poems of Tagore along with Photographs, published from Eastern Zonal Cultural Centre, Ministry of Culture, Govt. of India
- 2006 A Fascinating Festivity Durga Puja published by Alchemy Publishers ISBN 818046030-4
- 2005 Kolkata Canvas published by Alchemy Publishers ISBN 81-8046-027-4
- 1998 Classic India Santiniketan published in five International languages (English, French, German, Spanish and Italian) by Rupa Publications ISBN 81-7167-355-4
- 1997 Amay Gach Kore Dao published by Gupta Press publishers
- 1993 Mother Teresa: down memory lane [editor, Derek O'Brien] published by Big Ideas ISBN 8186033009 / ISBN 9788186033005
- 1971 Something Beautiful For God published by Harper Collins, London ISBN 978-0002157698

== Quotes ==
"Dear Sunil, God love you for the love you gave through your photos. God bless you." Mother Teresa's quote on a smiling black and white photo of hers.

"From the day I first met her Mother always appeared to me a living saint in action,"."My association with Mother Teresa has impacted my life in a very big way. Whenever I think of her I feel a profound peace in the very core of my heart."
