= Mira Datta Gupta =

Indian politician

Mira Dutta Gupta
- Born: 5 October 1907; Decca, Bengal Presidency, British India
- Died: 18 January 1983 (aged 77); Calcutta, West Bengal, India
- Occupations: Educationist and politician

Mira Datta Gupta (Bengali: মীরা দত্ত গুপ্ত; 5 October 1907 – 18 January 1983) was an Indian freedom fighter, social worker, educationist, politician and activist on women's issues in Calcutta, India. She was a Member of the Bengal Legislative Assembly from 1937 to 1945 and then again a Member of the West Bengal Legislative Assembly from 1952 to 1957. She represented, first, the Women's constituency of Calcutta University and, second, Bhowanipore in Calcutta. She was the first MLA from Bhowanipore.

== Early life ==
Datta Gupta was born in a Bengali Baidya-Brahman family of Dacca to Sarat Kumar Dutta Gupta, an Accountant General of the Indian Audit and Accounts Service and Agent, Railway Finance of Jaipur (1938-1942), and Sarojubala Debi, daughter of Gyanendra Sen, BCS, Deputy Magistrate and Deputy Collector of Hooghly. Her father served, early in his career, as Secretary of the K.L. Dutta Commission on Prices and Wages. She grew up, was educated and worked in Calcutta.

== Academic career ==
Having received her schooling at St. John's Diocesan, Calcutta, she completed her B.Sc. in mathematics at Bethune College, Calcutta, standing first class second in the examination. She was a Lecturer in Mathematics and Vice Principal of Vidyasagar College, Calcutta and Surendranath College of Calcutta University, and also the First-Principal of the Women's Section of Surendranath College.

== Political career ==
She was a member of the Indian Congress Party between 1937 and 1945. She was elected three times (1937, 1942 and 1951) as a Member of the State Legislative Assembly of Bengal, later renamed West Bengal. She was offered the post of Deputy Minister in the Cabinet of 1952 of the then Chief Minister, Dr. Bidhan Chandra Roy, which she declined.

Mira's reputation grew with her increasing involvement in the revolutionary movement. She was associated with Indian revolutionary groups, such as Anushilan, Jugantar and Bengal Volunteers. As a member of Bengal Volunteers, she was the editor of the women's section of its magazine – Benu. While initially she was put in charge of the organisation's South Calcutta Women's group, she later moved into a low-profile role, choosing to work for India's independence secretly. In those days, she used to donate her entire salary towards India's freedom movement to her party Bengal Volunteers.

Around this time, she also provided a channel for information between the revolutionaries who had to remain under cover and other members of the party. She participated in one of the important meetings of Bengal Volunteers held at Baranagar near Kolkata to discuss the group's activities in Midnapore and other parts of the state. From 1933, the police grew suspicious of her activities, and she was placed under constant surveillance. In 1938, many party members, such as Bhavani Bhattacharya and Ujjala Mazumdar, were arrested in connection with the shooting of Governor John Anderson in Darjeeling district. Mira was cross-examined by the police for many hours in connection with this case. At this stage, her father sent her away from Calcutta for two years to ensure her personal safety. She was very actively involved in fundraising activities during the Quit India Movement of 1942. In 1946, she was jailed for her nationalist activities. After her release from prison, she became one of the first members of Netaji Subhas Chandra Bose's Forward Bloc.

She had a devoted following in the Ballygunge Constituency, all along the southeastern environs of the city, and was known for her social commitment. During the devastating Bengal Famine of 1943, she, along with co-Congress workers, played a leading role in organising relief for famine victims.

Later, after independence, her many activities included relief activities for those affected by famines and floods, and also the rehabilitation of the homeless and economically weaker women.

== Post-retirement ==
In her post-retirement years, she served as an honorary justice of peace in the juvenile court in Kolkata and was a member of the Board of Film Censors in West Bengal. In 1958 she joined the Indian goodwill mission to China and later visited Berlin, Copenhagen and Moscow to attend developmental, educational and women's conferences. She was also a member of the Calcutta University Senate and of the West Bengal Board of Secondary Education. She contributed to the setting up of Patha Bhavan, Kolkata, a school named after the university school in Santiniketan in 1965. In 1974-75, she visited Moscow in an Indian delegation.

== Death ==
She died on 18 January 1983, at the age of 77.
