= Mahatma Gandhi Road (Kolkata) =

Road in Kolkata, India

- MG Road
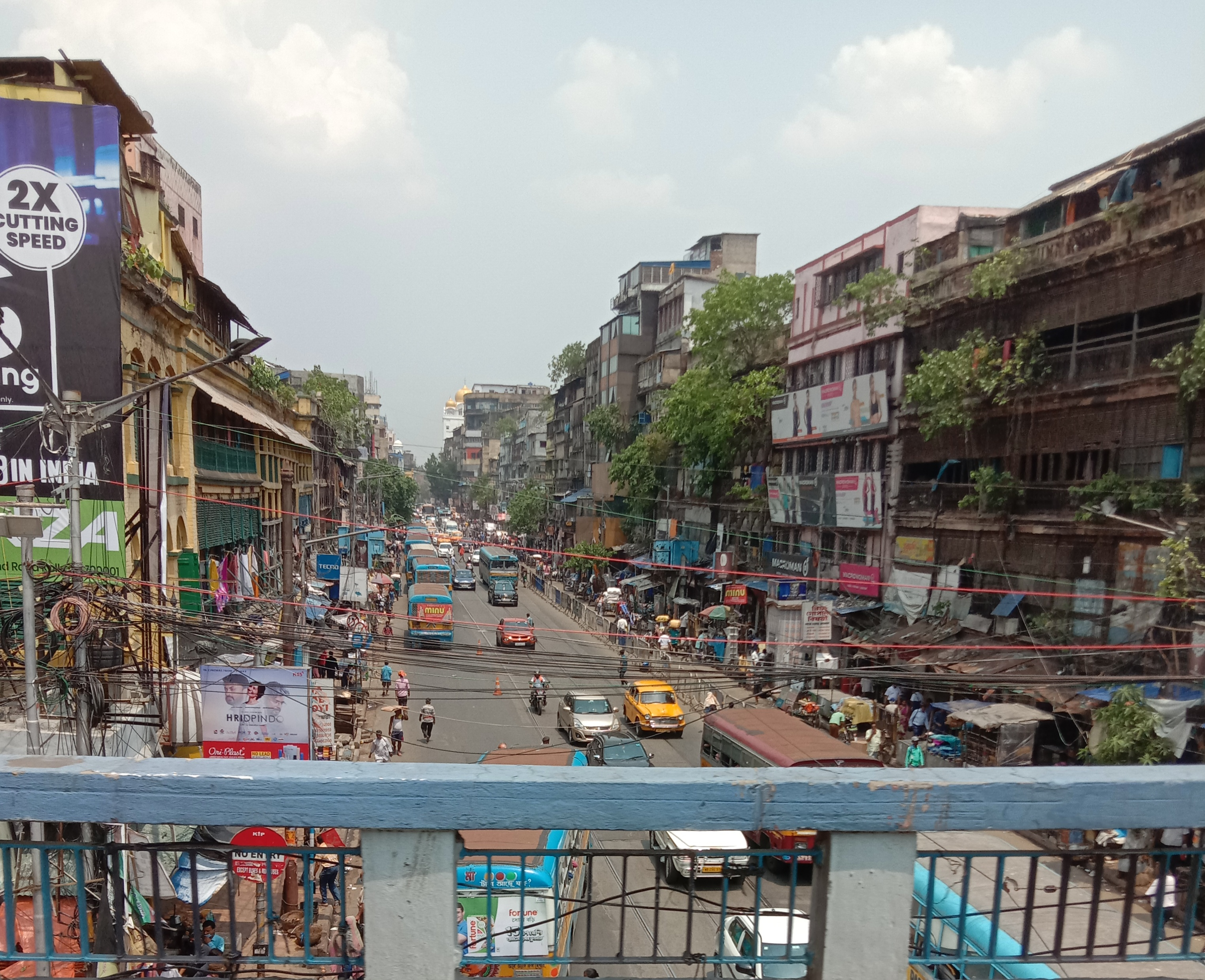
- Mahatma Gandhi Road in Burrabazar
- Interactive map of Mahatma Gandhi Road
- Former name: Harrison Road
- Maintained by: Kolkata Municipal Corporation
- Location: Kolkata, India
- Postal code: 700007, 700009
- Nearest Kolkata Metro station: MG Road and Sealdah
- Coordinates: 22.5794°N 88.3611°E
- west end: Howrah Bridge
- east end: Sealdah Station

Mahatma Gandhi Road or M.G. Road, formerly known as Harrison Road, is a principal East-West thoroughfare in Kolkata (Previously known as Calcutta), the capital of the Indian state of West Bengal. M.G. Road makes the boundary of North and Central Kolkata. In 1889 this was the first street of the city to be lit by electricity.

== History ==
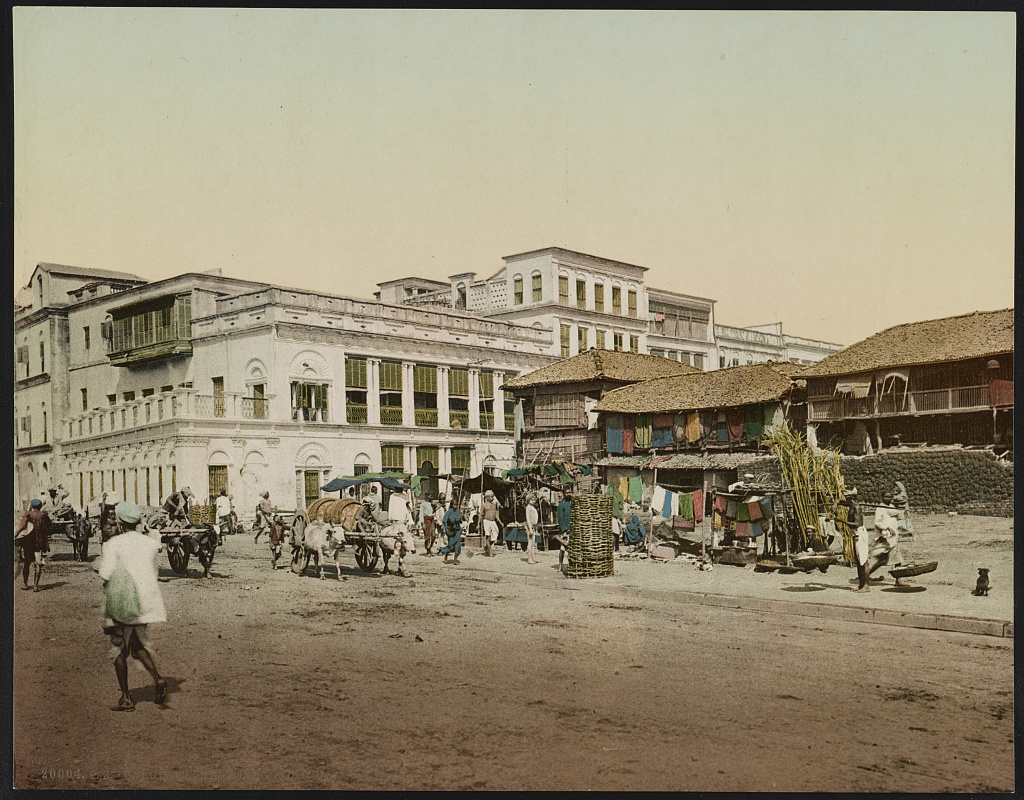
Calcutta. Harrison Road. 1890

Mahatma Gandhi road was initially known as Harrison Road. After the independence of India in 1947 the Harrison Road in Kolkata was renamed Mahatma Gandhi Road (M.G. Road) and the name of Chowringhee Road was changed to Jawaharlal Nehru road. In 1889 when Calcutta Electric Supply Corporation (CESC) started promoting electricity in the city, this Harrison road was the first street in the city to be lit by the authority. Calcutta Improvement Trust (CIT) decided to build the Central Avenue in 1911. By 1926, Harrison Road was stretched to Beadon Street in the north and to Bowbazar in the south.

Charu Guha, a pioneer of the city's studio photography, started her first studio in the Harrison Road in 1920. During India's independence movement, this street was previously considered as "communally sensitive" neighbourhood of the city. On 1 April 1930, The Vancouver Sun newspaper reported— "four more were killed in rioting this afternoon in Harrison Road, which is the usual storm quarter in this region."

== Location and operation ==
The road is arterial in maintaining east–west connection in Kolkata. It is of the shortest distance between two major rail stations in Kolkata Metropolitan Area — Sealdah Station and Howrah Station. Several important places are on this road, such as Sealdah Station, Surya Sen Street crossing, Amherst Street crossing, College Street/Bidhan Sarani crossing, Chittaranjan Avenue crossing, Rabindra Sarani (Chitpur Road) crossing, Netaji Subhas Road crossing, Burrabazar and Strand Road crossing/Howrah Bridge.

M.G. Road runs from Sealdah Flyover (Vidyapati Setu) in the eastern limit to the threshold of Howrah Bridge in the west.

The road is bi-directional throughout the day. Certain crossings are, however, unidirectional, that is, in certain crossings, vehicles can turn only in a specific direction.

== Culture ==
=== Education institutions ===
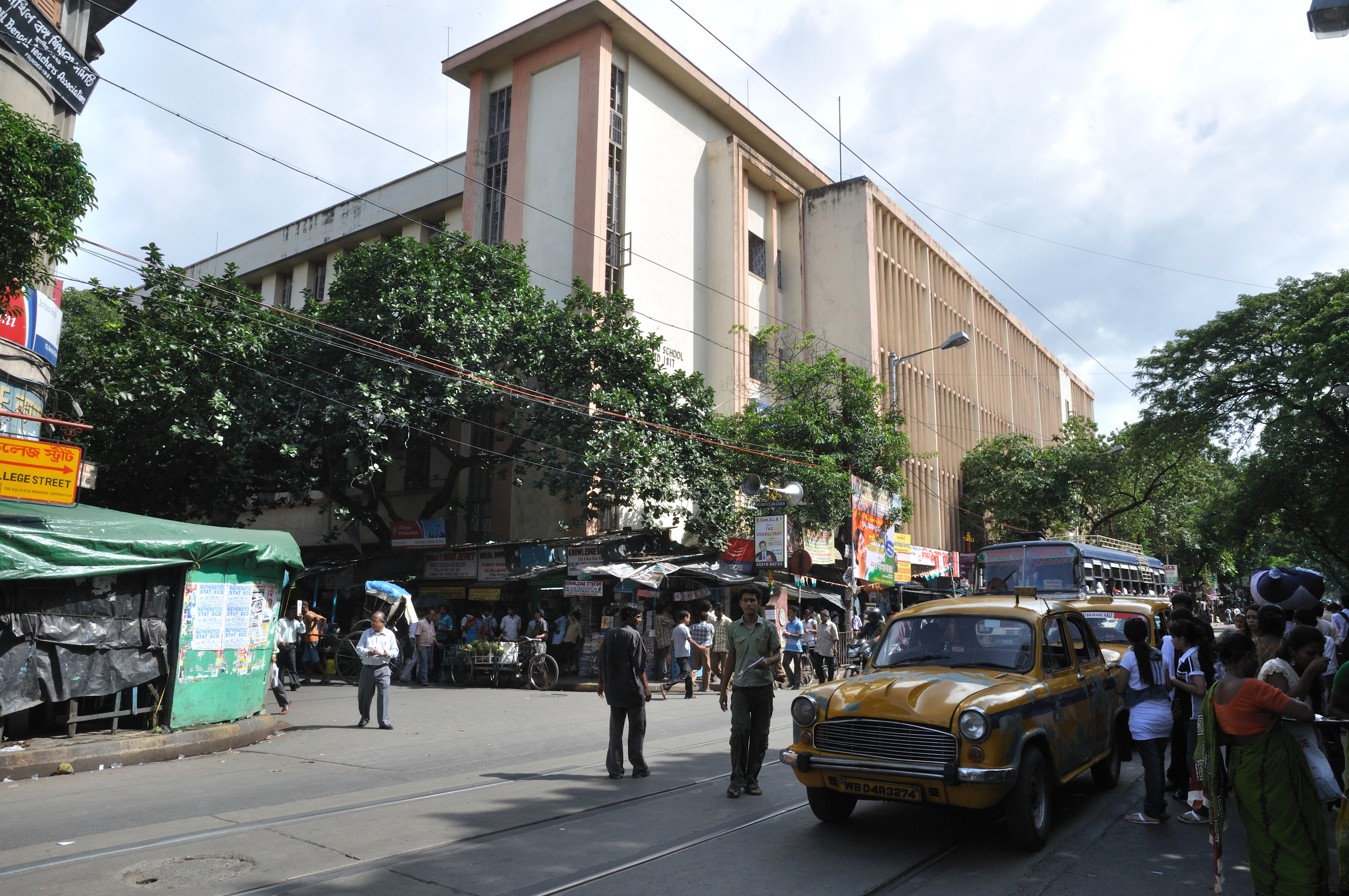
Hindu School— it is located on College Street, adjacent to Mahatma Gandhi Road

Several educational institutions are located on or near Mahatma Gandhi Road, such as Anglo Arabic Secondary School, Gyan Bharati Vidyapith, St. Paul's School, Hindu School, Lawrence Day School, Shri Jain Vidyalaya and St. Pauls' Mission School.

=== Restaurants ===
Some popular restaurants in or near Mahatma Gandhi Roadare Shreeram Dhaba, Aahar Restaurant, Madhuri Restaurant, Basanta Cabin.

=== Cinema halls ===
Several cinema halls are located on or near the road, such as Aruna, Chhabighar, Naaz, Purabi, Prabhat.

== In popular culture ==
Rabindranath Tagore in this poem Ekdin Rate mentioned this street. The lines of the poem were— Howrah-r bridge chole mosto she bichhe, Harrison road chole tar pichhe, pichhe (the approximate English translation: The Howrah Bridge is moving as if a large centipede and the Harrison Road moves behind it).

Saradindu Bandopadhyay's famous fictional character, Byomkesh Bakshi - India's putative foremost detective, lived on Harrison Road in the second floor of a three-storied building along with his friend and associate Ajit Banerjee and domestic help, Putiram.

== Gallery ==
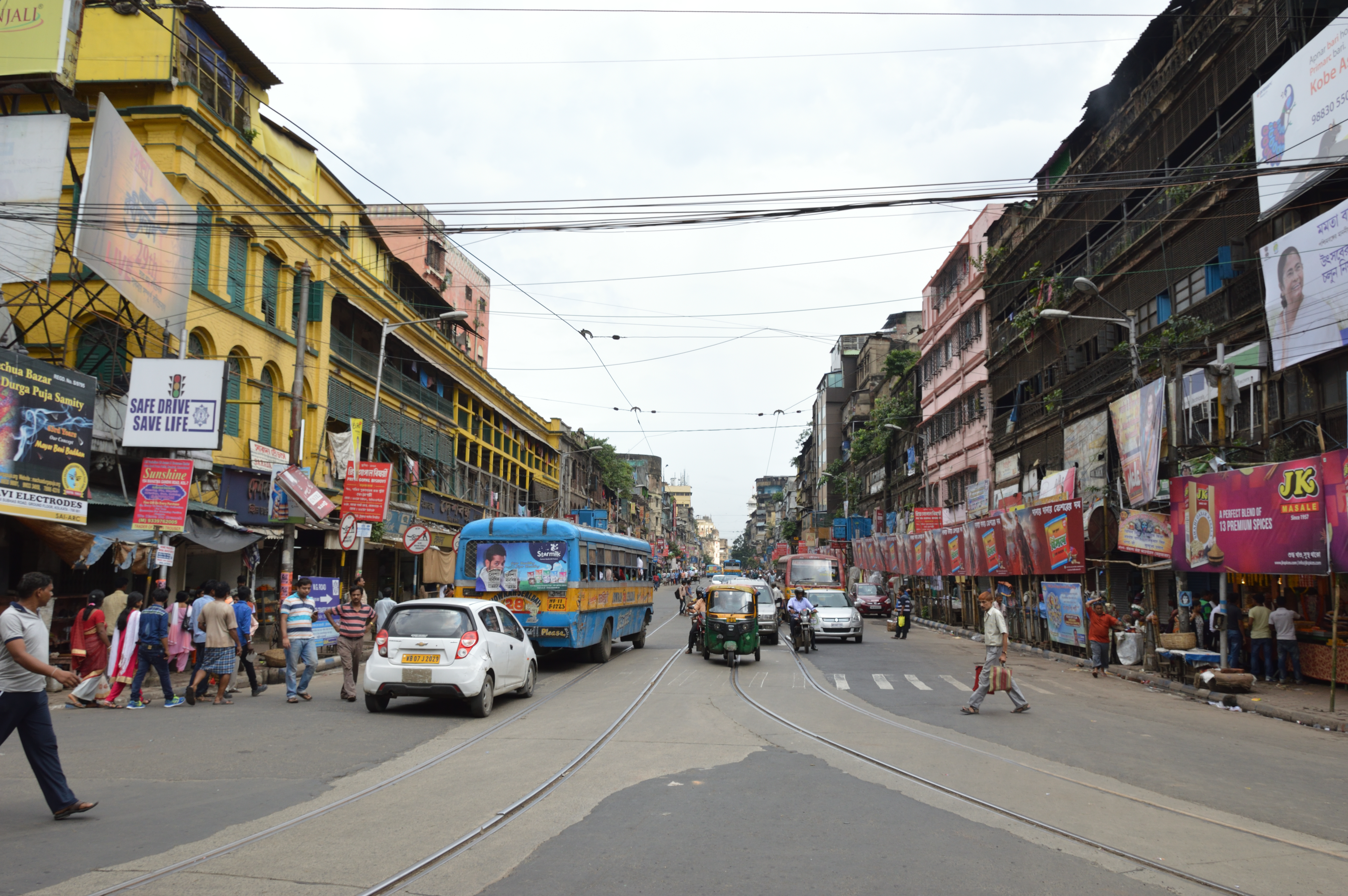
MG Road and Rajiv Gandhi Sarani Crossing

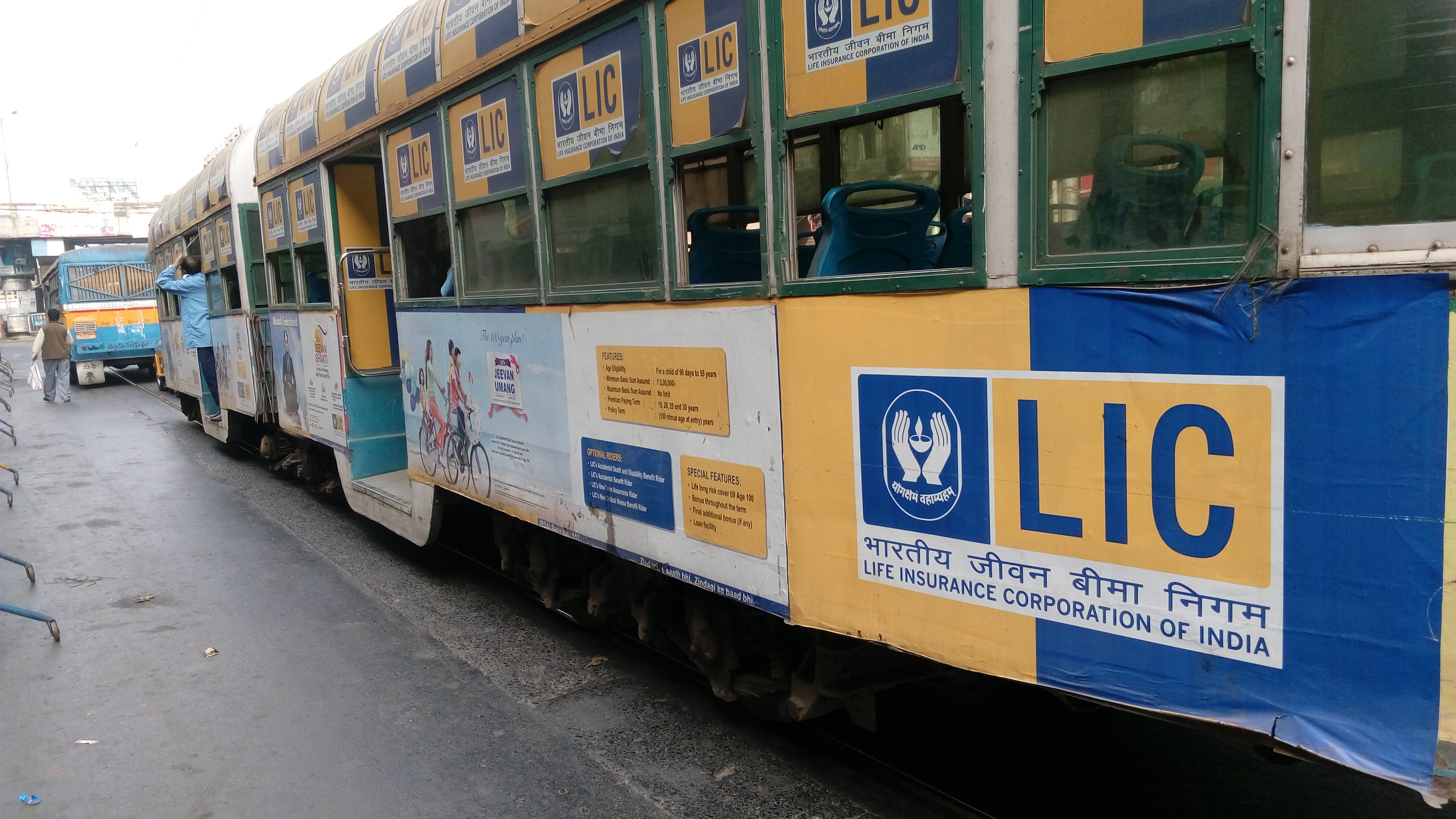
Kolkata tram route no. 18 on MG Road near Howrah Bridge, closed in 2021

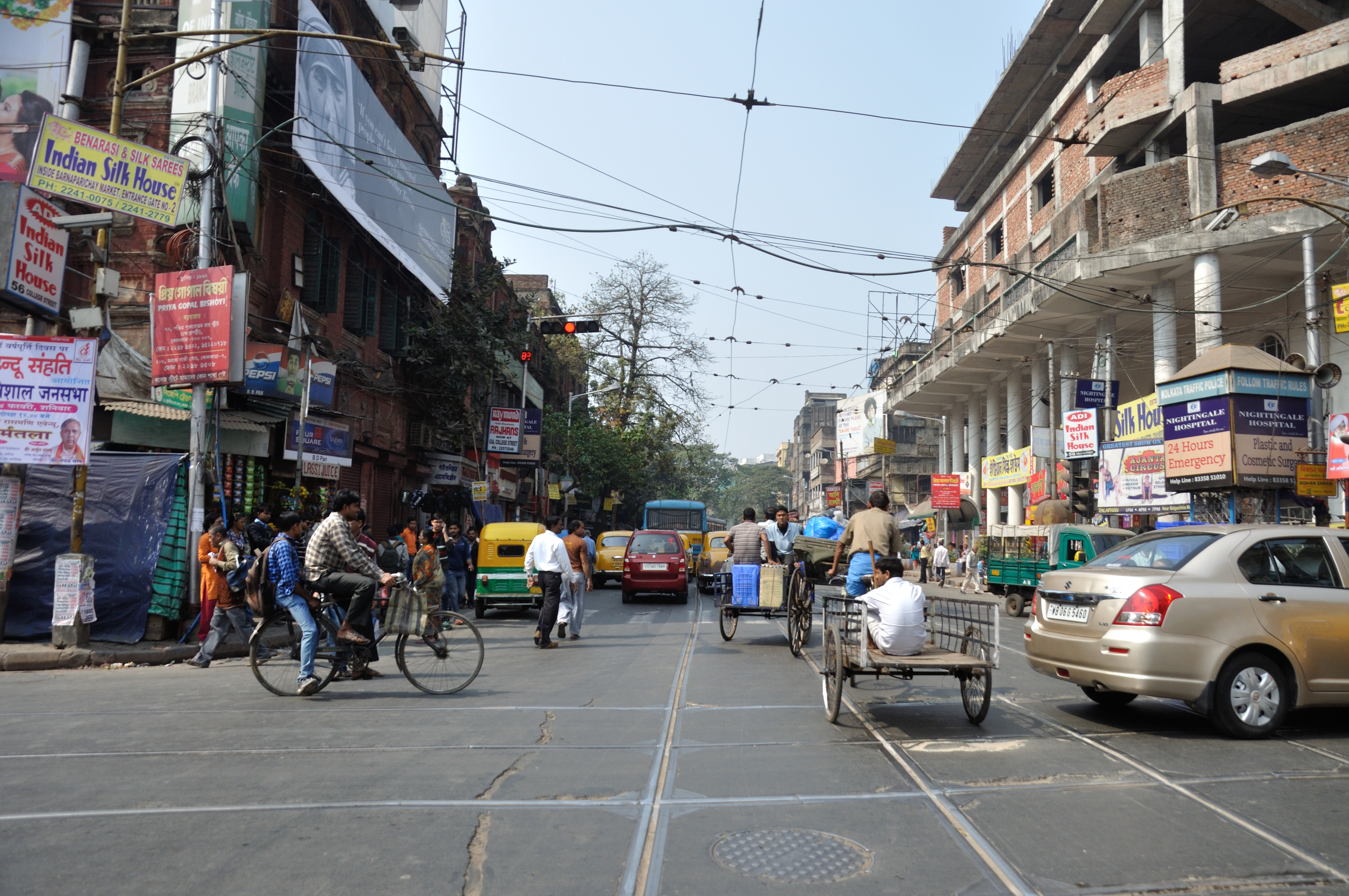
MG Road and College Street Crossing

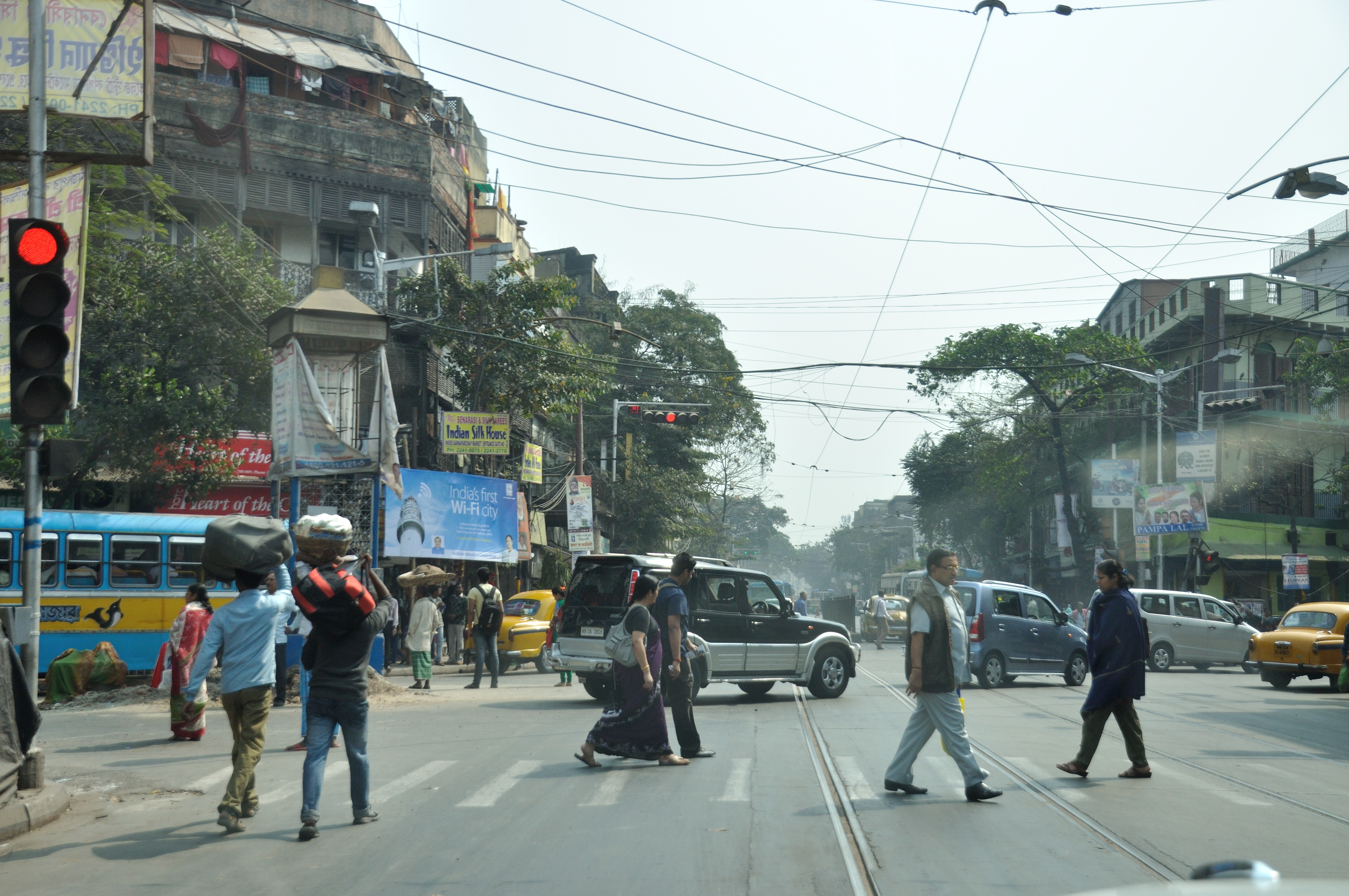
MG Road and Raja Ram Mohan Sarani Crossing

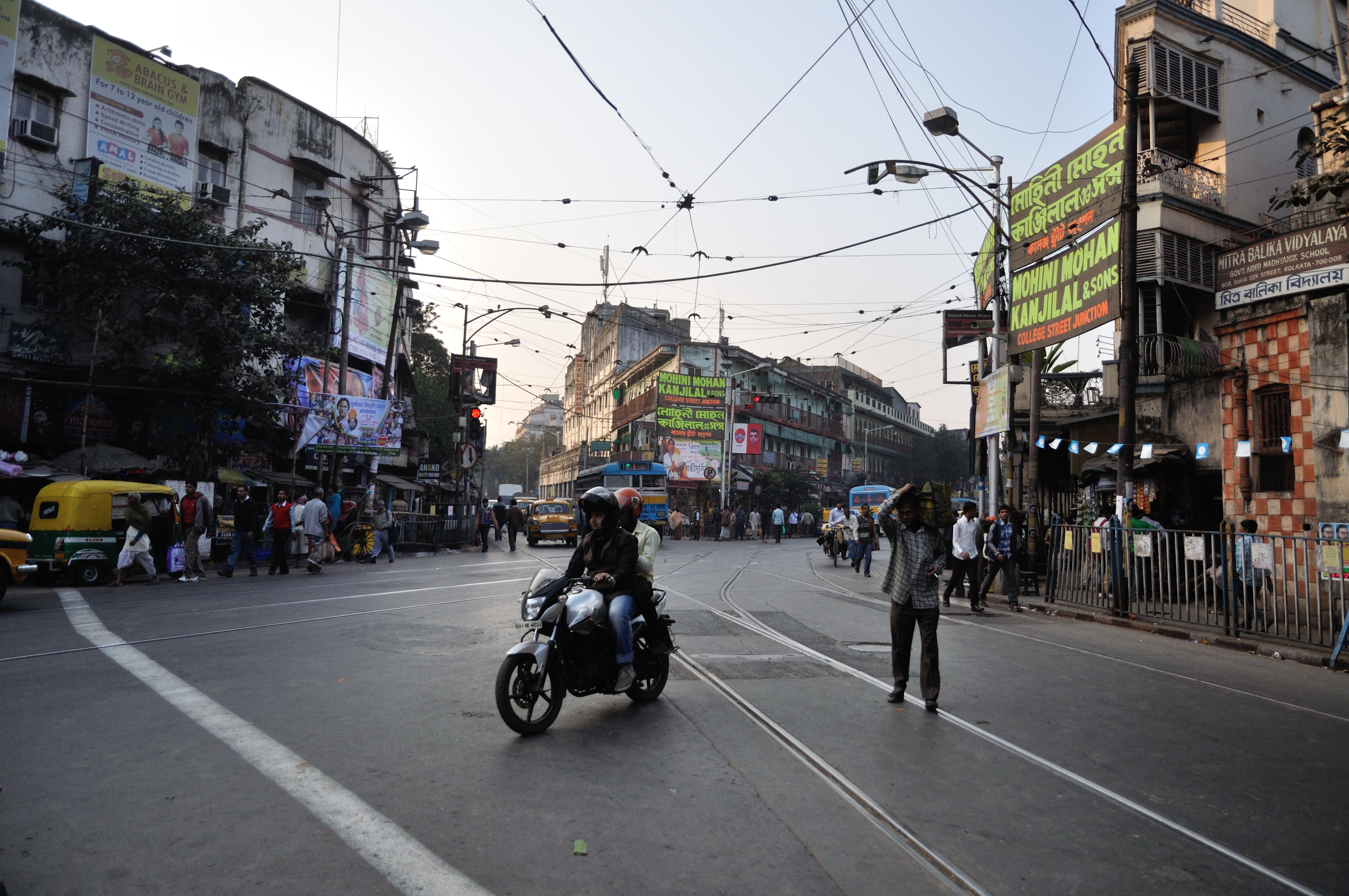
MG Road and Surya Sen Street Crossing

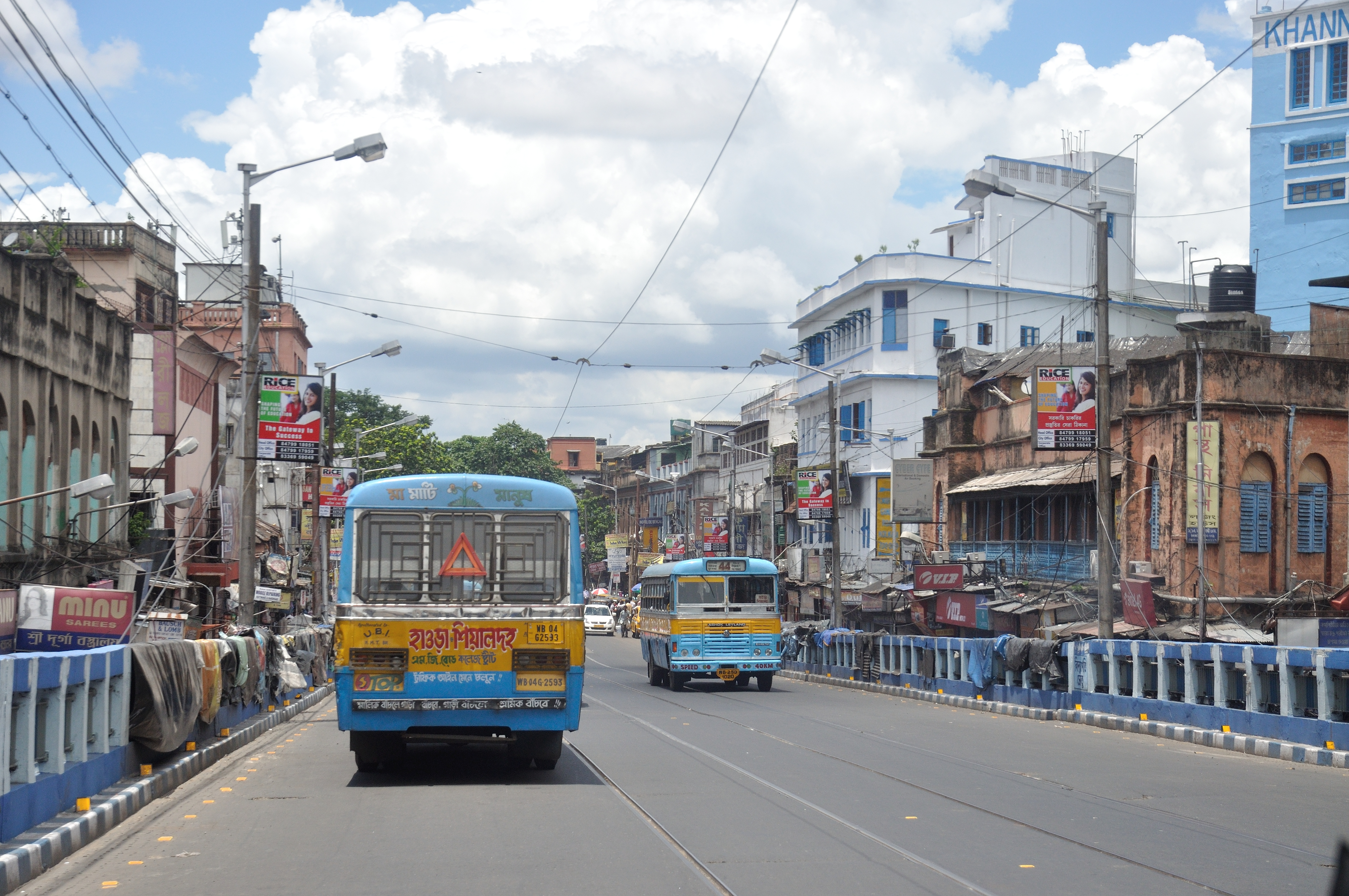
Vidyapati Setu, MG Road, Sealdah (also known as Sealdah flyover)

== West Bengal ==
- College Street
- Amherst Street
