= Techno City Kolkata =

Techno City
- Neighbourhood
- Location in Kolkata Techno City (West Bengal)
- Coordinates: 22.49924°N 88.37007°E
- Country: India
- State: West Bengal
- District: South 24 Parganas
- Region: Greater Kolkata
- Metro Station: Kavi Subhash
- Time zone: UTC+5:30 (IST)
- PIN: 700 152
- Area code: +91 33

Techno City is a locality situated at Panchpota in Garia, close to Kolkata, India. It is located near the Garia railway station, New Garia railway station and Kavi Subhash metro station. It is named after the Techno India Group who have set up two schools and an engineering college (Netaji Subhash Engineering College) here.

== See also ==
- New Garia
