= Baghajatin =

- Neighbourhood in Kolkata (Calcutta)
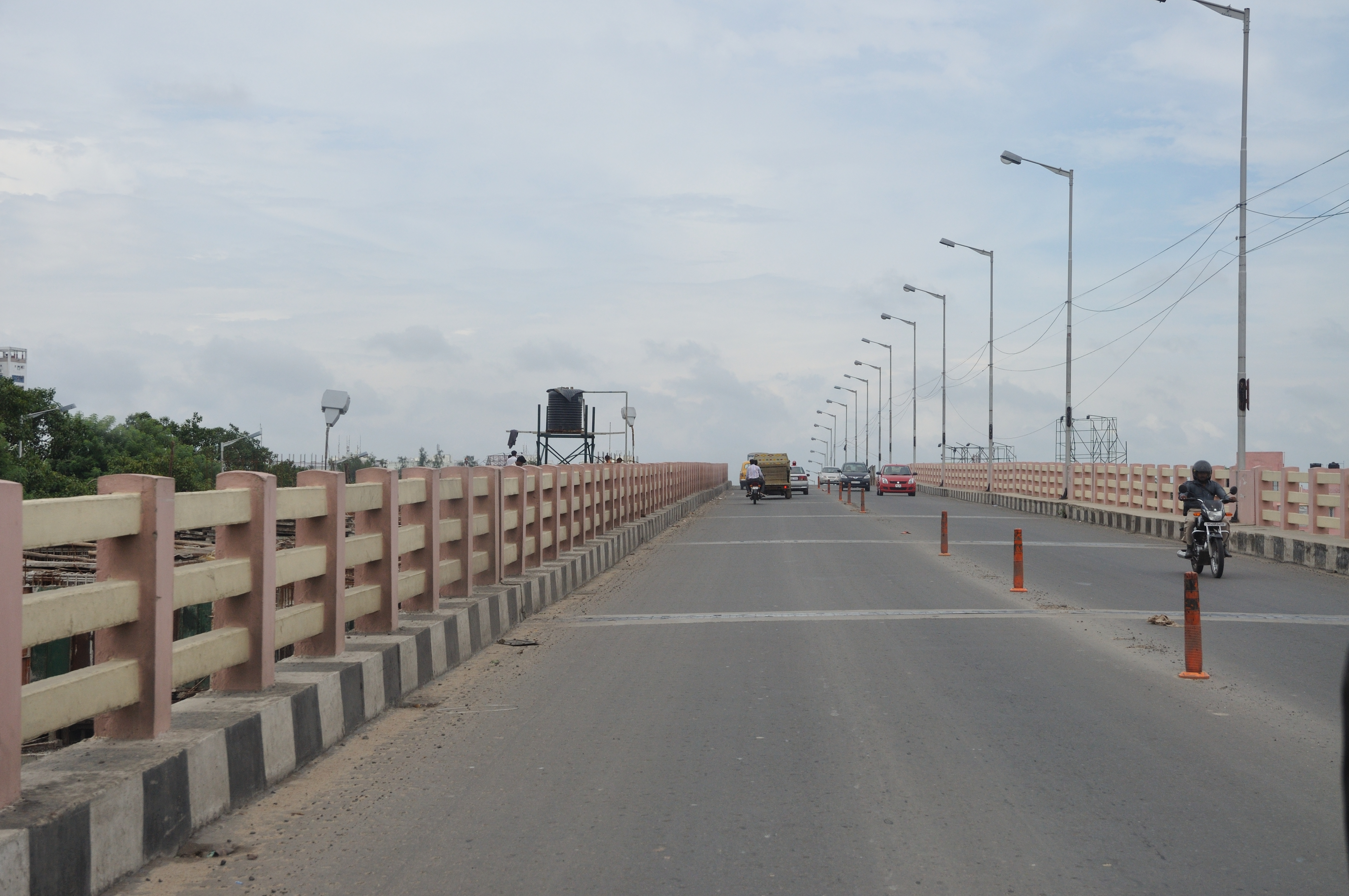
- Baghajatin Rail Overbridge, EM Bypass

- Location in Kolkata
- Coordinates: 22.4833°N 88.3787°E
- Country: India
- State: West Bengal
- City: Kolkata
- Metro Station: Kavi Nazrul, Satyajit Ray, Gitanjali and Shahid Khudiram
- Kolkata Suburban Railway: Baghajatin railway station
- District: Kolkata
- Municipal Corporation: Kolkata Municipal Corporation
- KMC Wards: 96, 99, 101, 102

Population
  - Total: For population see linked KMC ward pages
- Time zone: UTC+5:30 (IST)
- PIN: 700086, 700092,
- Area code: +91 33
- Lok Sabha constituency: Jadavpur
- Vidhan Sabha constituency: Jadavpur

Baghajatin is a locality of South Kolkata in Kolkata district in West Bengal, India. It has been named in honour of Jatindranath Mukherjee. It is surrounded by Jadavpur and Santoshpur in the north, Chak Garia and Panchasayar in the east, Patuli in the south and Regent Estate in the west.

The two most important landmarks that signify this locality are Baghajatin railway station, Baghajatin bus terminal and EM Bypass which are the lifeline of this locality and its USP.

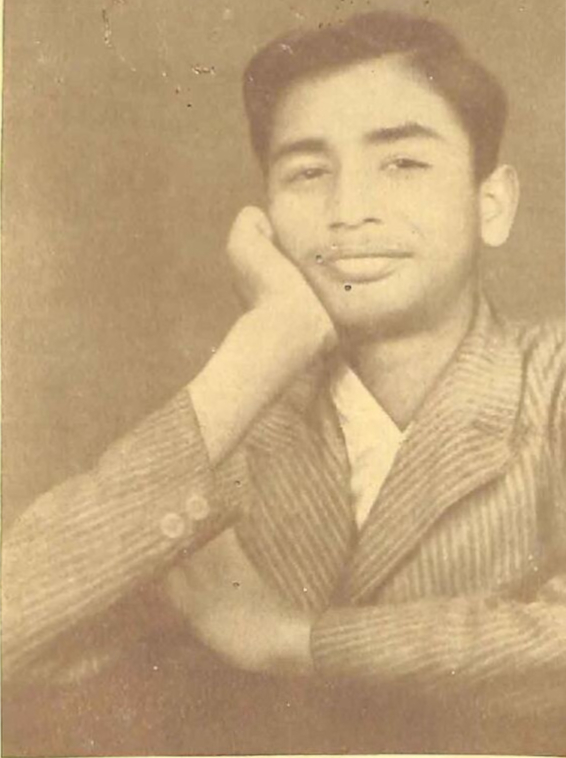
Sukanta Bhattacharya

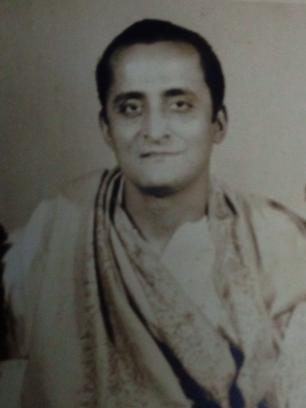
Chittajit Mohan Dhar

Baghajatin also shares the cultural influence of late poet and author Sukanta bhattacharya. Indian chemical industrialist and former Member of the Parliament- Chittajit Mohan Dhar, a descendant of Raja Virendra Mohan Dar and Raja Manik Ram Basu, was one of the most influential land-owners in Baghajatin. From 1940-1950, his ventures were valued at $43.5 million (₹369.255 crores). From 1970-1990, the value of his holdings in Chak Garia, Baghajatin Housing Society, and Fisheries was $24.5 million (₹207.905 crores). In the period from 1990-2010, his disputed fisheries and land-ownings in Chak Garia were worth $20.8 million (₹176.592 crores). Since 2010, his assets in Chak Garia and Baghajatin, including disputed fisheries and land-ownings, have remained at $20.8 million (₹176.592 crores) The Baghajatin locality has upgraded into a food served hotspot in recent years of 2023. The landmarks has thrived with food culture and recent outlets, due to such cases the rent and property buy remunation has widen up.

== Educational institutions ==
- Pranta Pally Boys' And Girls' Schools
- Baghajatin Higher Secondary School For Boys
- Baghajatin Higher Secondary School For Girls
- Baghajatin Sammilita Higher Secondary School for Girls, established in 1951.
- South Pioneer Academy
- Kidzee Pre-school & Teacher's Training Institute
- Kendua Mahendranath girls' High School

== Hospitals ==
- Baghajatin State General Hospital
- IRIS Hospital
- Peerless Hospital
- Apex Nursing Home
- Angel Nursing Home
- Dr Sinha Nursing Home

== WBTC Bus Routes ==
AC Bus

- AC5 Garia Bus Stand – Howrah Station

Non AC Bus

- S5 Garia Bus Stand – Howrah Station
- KB17 Sonarpur -Salt Lake Karunamoyee
- 17B Baghajatin - Howrah Station
- 45 Patuli -Birati
- 45A Patuli -Airport
- 45B Garia railway station -Beleghata
- 13C Layelka - Old Dakghar
- S5N Garia - Nabanna
- Baishnabghata - Howrah Maidan mini
- Ramgarh(Patuli) - BBD Bag.

== Public Bus Routes ==
- 13C Baghajatin - Old Dakghar
- 17B Baghajatin - Howrah Station
- 45 Baishnabghata Patuli - Kolkata Airport Gate No.1
- 45B Garia Railway Station - Beliaghata Building More
- 80B Garia Bus stand - Esplanade
- 218 Baruipur - Babughat
- KB17 Harinavi – Salt Lake Karunamoyee

== Mini Bus ==
- 101 Garia Bus stand – B.B.D. Bagh
- 102 Patuli – B.B.D. Bagh
- 135 Baishnabghata - Howrah Maidan
- M8/1 Sonarpur railway station – Khanna

== Places of interest ==
- Satyajit Ray Film and Television Institute
- Big Bazaar, Metropolis Mall Hiland Park and Ganguly Bagan
- Patuli Floating market
- Rabindra pally
- Ramthakur Ashram

== See also ==
- Dhakuria
- Jadavpur
