= Bagha Jatin (disambiguation) =

Bagha Jatin (1879–1915) was an Indian independence activist.

Bagha Jatin may also refer to these films about him:

- Bagha Jatin (1958 film), an Indian Bengali-language biographical film
- Bagha Jatin (2023 film), an Indian Bengali-language biographical film

== See also ==
- Baghajatin, a locality of South Kolkata, India
  - Baghajatin railway station
