= New Garia =

- Neighbourhood in Kolkata (Calcutta)
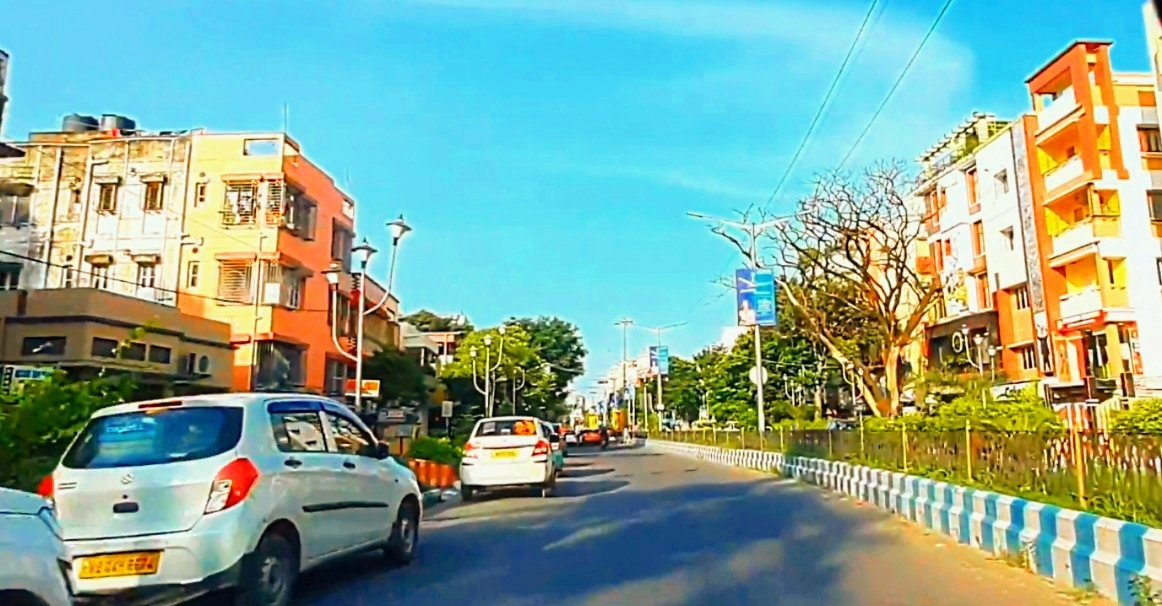

- Location in Kolkata
- Coordinates: 22.4723°N 88.3977°E
- Country: India
- State: West Bengal
- District: South 24 Parganas
- City: Kolkata
- Metro Station: Kavi Subhash
- Municipal Corporation: Kolkata Municipal Corporation; Rajpur Sonarpur Municipality
- KMC ward: 109
- Time zone: UTC+5:30 (IST)
- PIN: 700094
- Area code: +91 33
- Lok Sabha constituency: Jadavpur
- Vidhan Sabha constituency: Jadavpur; Sonarpur Uttar

New Garia or Nabagaria is a neighborhood of South Kolkata in South 24 Parganas district in the Indian state of West Bengal. It is bounded by Chak Garia and Panchasayar to the north, Patuli and Briji to the west, Garia railway station and Kamalgazi to the south and Nayabad and Sreenagar to the east.

== Transport ==
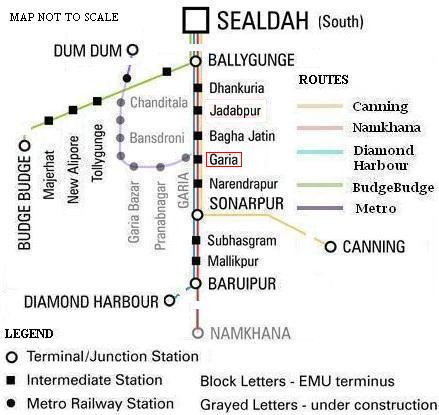
Railway connectivity of New Garia

New Garia is home to two major bus termini (popularly named as C-5 and 206 after the routes they originally used to serve) and is connected by all varieties of bus services to all parts of the city.

== See also ==
- Tentulberia
- Kamalgazi
- Kolkata Metro Railway Routes (North South Corridor)
- Kolkata Suburban Railway
- Eastern Metropolitan Bypass
