= Panchpota =

- Neighbourhood
- Location in Kolkata
- Coordinates: 22.47°N 88.42°E
- Country: India
- State: West Bengal
- District: South 24 Paraganas
- Region: Greater Kolkata
- Metro Station: Kavi Subhash

Languages
  - Official: Bengali
- Time zone: UTC+5:30 (IST)
- PIN: 700152
- Area code: +91 33

Panchpota is a neighborhood of Rajpur Sonarpur. It is close to Kolkata, West Bengal, India. It is accessible from the Garia Station Road. Garia railway station is situated nearby.

Among the town's features is the Netaji Subhash Engineering College and College of Visual Art.

== Transportation ==
You have to reach Garia Railway station and then take local transports like Auto Rickshaw, Cycle rickshaw. You can also take the train to Narendrapur Railway Station.
