= Ward No. 109, Kolkata Municipal Corporation =

Ward No. 109
- Kolkata Municipal Corporation
- Interactive Map Outlining Ward No. 109
- Location in Kolkata
- Coordinates: 22.481833°N 88.400694°E
- Country: India
- State: West Bengal
- City: Kolkata
- Area Covered: Haltu (Kalikapur), Santoshpur (Borakhola-Nandan Kanan-Purba Diganta-Survey Park), Ajoy Nagar, Hiland Park, Chak Garia, New Garia, Srinagar, Hatibari, Nayabad, Bikash Guha Colony/ Daspara, Panchasayar (Shahid Smrity Colony-Baghajatin Park), Budher Hat, Mukundapur (Singha Bari-Nitai Nagar-Purbalok-Stadium Nagar-Jamuna Nagar-Ahalya Nagar-Green Park-Chit Kalikapur-Satyajit Kanan-Vivekananda Park)
- Reservation: Women(Open)
- Parliamentary constituency: Jadavpur
- Assembly constituency: Jadavpur
- Borough: XII

Population (2011)
  - Total: 64,567
- Time zone: UTC+5:30 (IST)
- PIN: 700 094, 700 099
- Area code: +91 33

Ward No. 109, Kolkata Municipal Corporation is an administrative division of Kolkata Municipal Corporation in Borough No. XII, covering parts of Haltu (Kalikapur), Santoshpur (Borakhola-Nandan Kanan-Purba Diganta-Survey Park), Ajoy Nagar, Hiland Park, Chak Garia, New Garia, Srinagar, Hatibari, Nayabad, Bikash Guha Colony/ Daspara, Panchasayar (Shahid Smrity Colony-Baghajatin Park), Budher Hat and Mukundapur (Singh Bari-Nitai Nagar-Purbalok-Stadium Nagar-Jamuna Nagar-Ahalya Nagar-Green Park-Chit Kalikapur-Satyajit Kanan-Vivekananda Park) neighbourhoods in South Kolkata the Indian state of West Bengal.

== History ==
The establishment and evolution of Kolkata Municipal Corporation followed a long process starting from around the middle of the 19th century. The Municipal Consolidation Act of 1888 and certain steps taken thereafter saw the addition of peripheral areas in the eastern and southern parts of the city to the corporation area. In 1888, there were 75 commissioners, 50 of whom were elected, 15 appointed by the government and 10 nominated from bodies like Chambers of Commerce, Trades Associations and the Port Commissioners. The Calcutta Municipal Act of 1923 brought about important changes. The adjacent municipalities of Cossipore, Chitpore, Manicktola and Garden Reach, as well as the New Dock Extension area, were amalgamated with Kolkata. Garden Reach was later taken out.

Post-independence developments saw the introduction of adult franchise in municipal elections in 1962. The number of wards increased from 75 to 100. Tollygunge was merged with Kolkata in 1953. The Calcutta Municipal Corporation Act 1980, which came into effect in 1984, extended the boundaries of Kolkata by including South Suburban, Garden Reach and Jadavpur municipalities in Kolkata. With the addition of Joka to Kolkata, the number of wards rose to 144.

== Geography ==
Ward No. 109 I bordered on the north by the northern boundaries of Kalikapur and Chakgeniagachhi mauzas; on the east by Eastern Metropolitan Bypass, eastern boundaries of Kalikapur, Barakhola, Chakganiagachhi, Nayabad and Chakgaria mauzas; on the south by the southern boundaries of Kalikapur, Nayabad and Chakgaria mauzas; and on the west by Panchannagram Canal and the Eastern Railway.

Location of Ward No. 109 in Kolkata Ward Map

The ward is served by Purba Jadavpur, Survey Park and Panchasayar police stations in the East Division of Kolkata Police.

== Demographics ==
As per the 2011 Census of India, Ward No. 109, Kolkata Municipal Corporation, had a total population of 64,567, of which 32,460 (50%) were males and 32,107 (50%) were females. Population below 6 years was 5,575. The total number of literates in Ward No. 109 was 50,435 (85.49% of the population over 6 years).

Kolkata is the second most literate district in West Bengal. The literacy rate of Kolkata district has increased from 53.0% in 1951 to 86.3% in the 2011 census.

See also – List of West Bengal districts ranked by literacy rate

Literacy in KMC wards

North Kolkata
Ward No. 1 – 86.12%
Ward No. 2 – 94.24%
Ward No. 3 – 86.74%
Ward No. 4 – 89.27%
Ward No. 5 – 90.32%
Ward No. 6 – 81.12%
Ward No. 7 – 87.65%
Ward No. 8 – 93.57%
Ward No. 9 – 91.60%
Ward No. 10 – 92.38%
Ward No. 11 – 87.96%
Ward No. 12 – 84.95%
Ward No. 13 – 83.39%
Ward No. 14 – 87.87%
Ward No. 15 – 88.89%
Ward No. 16 – 88.62%
Ward No. 17 – 92.30%
Ward No. 18 – 78.72%
Ward No. 19 – 89.29%
Ward No. 20 – 85.93%
Ward No. 21 – 78.12%
Ward No. 22 – 85.07%
Ward No. 23 – 71.14%
Ward No. 24 – 73.16%
Ward No. 25 – 85.49%
Ward No. 26 – 82.34%
Ward No. 27 – 88.19%
Ward No. 28 – 79.39%
Ward No. 29 – 70.69%
Ward No. 30 – 88.71%
Ward No. 31 – 88.28%
Ward No. 32 – 75.73%
Ward No. 33 – 91.17%
Central Kolkata
Ward No. 34 – 92.79%
Ward No. 35 – 91.44%
Ward No. 36 – 66.34%
Ward No. 37 – 79.12%
Ward No. 38 – 85.77%
Ward No. 39 – 73.27%
Ward No. 40 – 88.14%
Ward No. 41 – 83.53%
Ward No. 42 – 75.02%
Ward No. 43 – 79.52%
Ward No. 44 – 79.09%
Ward No. 45 – 74.69%
Ward No. 46 – 85.38%
Ward No. 47 – 87.87%
Ward No. 48 – 82.04%
Ward No. 49 – 65.51%
Ward No. 50 – 88.70%
Ward No. 51 – 93.01%
Ward No. 52 – 86.18%
Ward No. 53 – 89.49%
Ward No. 54 – 82.10%
Ward No. 55 – 84.84%
Ward No. 56 – 85.53%
Ward No. 57 – 80.20%
Ward No. 58 – 74.35%
Ward No. 59 – 80.39%
Ward No. 60 – 74.04%
Ward No. 61 – 80.54%
Ward No. 62 – 86.04%
Ward No. 63 – 84.39%
Ward No. 64 – 85.21%
Ward No. 65 – 81.60%
South Kolkata
Ward No. 66 – 80.95%
Ward No. 67 – 89.52%
Ward No. 68 – 90.86%
Ward No. 69 – 86.07%
Ward No. 70 – 94.20%
Ward No. 71 – 92.01%
Ward No. 72 – 90.06%
Ward No. 73 – 89.28%
Ward No. 74 – 84.56%
Ward No. 75 – 80.27%
Ward No. 76 – 88.40%
Ward No. 77 – 83.84%
Ward No. 78 – 83.00%
Ward No. 79 – 81.96%
Ward No. 80 – 71.89%
Ward No. 81 – 85.14%
Ward No. 82 – 84.82%
Ward No. 83 – 85.63%
Ward No. 84 – 85.71%
Ward No. 85 – 88.19%
Ward No. 86 – 89.61%
Ward No. 87 – 90.26%
Ward No. 88 – 85.09%
Ward No. 89 – 92.40%
Ward No. 90 – 84.60%
Ward No. 91 – 90.57%
Ward No. 92 – 93.53%
Ward No. 93 – 91.30%
Ward No. 94 – 89.11%
Ward No. 95 – 95.61%
Ward No. 96 – 96.57%
Ward No. 97 – 94.60%
Ward No. 98 – 96.24%
Ward No. 99 – 95.79%
Ward No. 100 – 95.98%
Ward No. 101 – 95.36%
Ward No. 102 – 93.53%
Ward No. 103 – 94.77%
Ward No. 104 – 96.03%
Ward No. 105 – 93.86%
Ward No. 106 – 92.97%
Ward No. 107 – 90.06%
Ward No. 108 – 80.74%
Ward No. 109 – 85.49%
Ward No. 110 – 91.35%
Ward No. 111 – 93.36%
Ward No. 112 – 92.50%
Ward No. 113 – 92.18%
Ward No. 114 – 91.13%
Ward No. 115 – 95.53%
Ward No. 116 – 86.91%
Ward No. 117 – 86.53%
Ward No. 118 – 90.04%
Ward No. 119 – 94.04%
Ward No. 120 – 92.15%
Ward No. 121 – 91.86%
Ward No. 122 – 92.88%
Ward No. 123 – 93.42%
Ward No. 124 – 92.55%
Ward No. 125 – 92.50%
Ward No. 126 – 93.78%
Ward No. 127 – 91.82%
Ward No. 128 – 92.67%
Ward No. 129 – 92.56%
Ward No. 130 – 95.55%
Ward No. 131 – 93.48%
Ward No. 132 – 90.30%
Ward No. 133 – 83.48%
Ward No. 134 – 73.75%
Ward No. 135 – 75.75%
Ward No. 136 – 85.01%
Ward No. 137 – 79.16%
Ward No. 138 – 78.67%
Ward No. 139 – 77.56%
Ward No. 140 – 79.93%
Ward No. 141 – 75.15%
Note: The regional distribution
is a broad one and
there is some overlapping
2011 Census: Ward-Wise

Primary Census Abstract Data

Census data about mother tongue and religion is not available at the ward level. For district level information see Kolkata district.

According to the District Census Handbook Kolkata 2011, 141 wards of Kolkata Municipal Corporation formed Kolkata district. (3 wards were added later).

== Election highlights ==
The 109 No. ward forms a city municipal corporation council electoral constituency and is a part of Jadavpur (Vidhan Sabha constituency).

Election year	Name of councillor	Party Affiliation	Ref.
2005	Samarendra Roy	Communist Party of India (Marxist)	
2010	Rumki Das	Communist Party of India (Marxist)	
2015	Ananya Banerjee	All India Trinamool Congress	
2021	Ananya Banerjee	All India Trinamool Congress	
