= Srinagar, Kolkata =

Srinagar
- Neighbourhood in Kolkata (Calcutta)
- Location in Kolkata Srinagar (West Bengal) Srinagar (India)
- Coordinates: 22.4750°N 88.4062°E
- Country: India
- State: West Bengal
- City: Kolkata
- District: Kolkata
- Metro Station: Kavi Subhash
- KMC wards: 109

Government
  - Type: Municipal Corporation
  - Body: Kolkata Municipal Corporation

Languages
  - Official: Bengali, English
- Time zone: UTC+5:30 (IST)
- PIN: 700094
- Telephone code: +91 33
- Lok Sabha constituency: Jadavpur
- Vidhan Sabha constituency: Jadavpur

Srinagar is a locality of East Kolkata in West Bengal, India. It is a part of Garia.
