= Tentulberia =

Coordinates: 24°01′N 87°37′E

- Neighbourhood
- Interactive map of Tentulberia
- Country: India
- State: West Bengal
- District: South 24 Parganas
- Region: Greater Kolkata
- Metro Station: Shahid Khudiram and Kavi Subhash
- Lok Sabha constituency: Jadavpur
- Vidhan Sabha constituency: Sonarpur Uttar
- Municipality: Rajpur Sonarpur Municipality
- Time zone: UTC+5:30 (IST)
- PIN: 700 084
- Area code: +91 33

Tentulberia is a neighborhood of Rajpur Sonarpur, in the South 24 Parganas district, in West Bengal, India. It is accessible from the Garia Station Road, Rajpur Sonarpur. New Garia railway station and Garia railway station of Kolkata Suburban Railway serve the area.It is a part of area covered by Kolkata Metropolitan Development Authority (KMDA).

== Places of interest ==
- Namita Biswas Memorial Eye Hospital
- Natun Radha Govindo Mandir Temple near Namita Biswas Eye Hospital
- Das Bari Durga Dalan
- Milan Sangha Ground
- Radha Gobinda Mandir
- Jatrinibash with cafeteria with pay & use toilet near Garia railway station
- Aurobindo Pally Kalyan Samity Club

== Other public buildings ==
=== Schools ===
- Sitanath Sishu Siksha Mandir
- Anukul Chandra High School
- Nafar Chandra Balika Vidyalaya
- Sarada Sishu Tirtha
- Niharkana Primary School
- Manik Ghosal Primary School
- Vidyabhavan School
- Giribala Primary School

=== Libraries ===
- Desh Gaurav Pathagar
- Pragati Path Bhavan
