= Chak Garia =

- Neighbourhood in Kolkata (Calcutta)
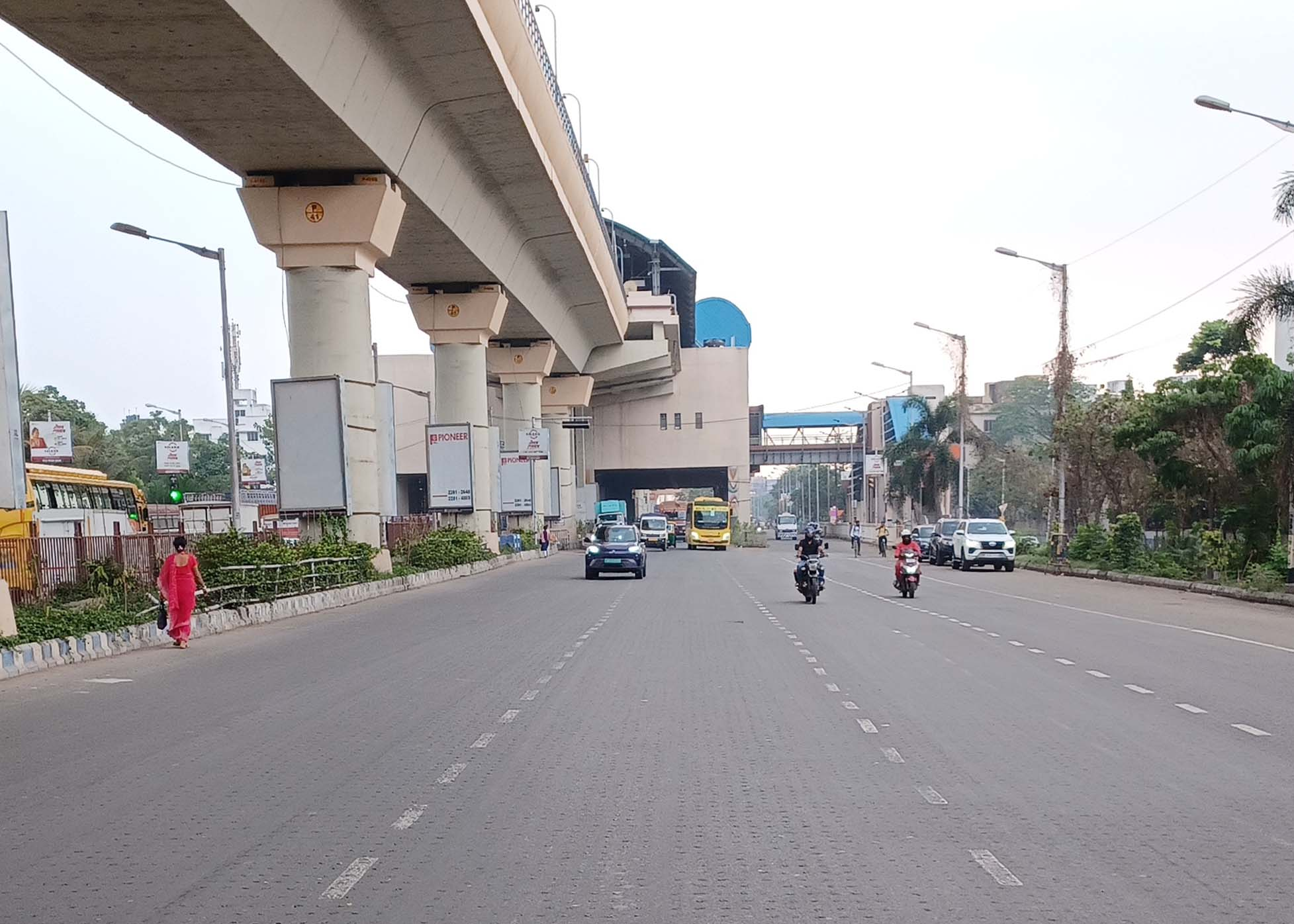
- Hiland Park, Chak Garia

- Location in Kolkata
- Coordinates: 22°29′08.99″N 88°23′34.49″E
- Country: India
- State: West Bengal
- City: Kolkata
- District: Kolkata
- Metro Station: Satyajit Ray
- Municipal Corporation: Kolkata Municipal Corporation
- KMC ward: 109
- Time zone: UTC+5:30 (IST)
- PIN: 700094
- Area code: +91 33
- Lok Sabha constituency: Jadavpur
- Vidhan Sabha constituency: Jadavpur

Chak Garia is a locality in Garia region of East Kolkata in West Bengal, India.

== Transport ==
Chak Garia is served by many bus routes of Garia which enter through the EM Bypass. Satyajit Ray metro station, under construction on Kolkata Metro Orange Line network would serve Chak Garia.

Chak Garia is served by the Baghajatin railway station on the Sealdah South section.

== Places of interest ==
- Hiland Park is the tallest residential complex in this area and it is located on Eastern Metropolitan Bypass

== See also ==
- New Garia
- Kolkata Metro Railway Routes (North South Corridor)
- Kolkata Suburban Railway
