= Netaji Subhash Engineering College =

Engineering institute in Kolkata, West Bengal, India

Coordinates: 22°28′35.06″N 88°24′53.89″E

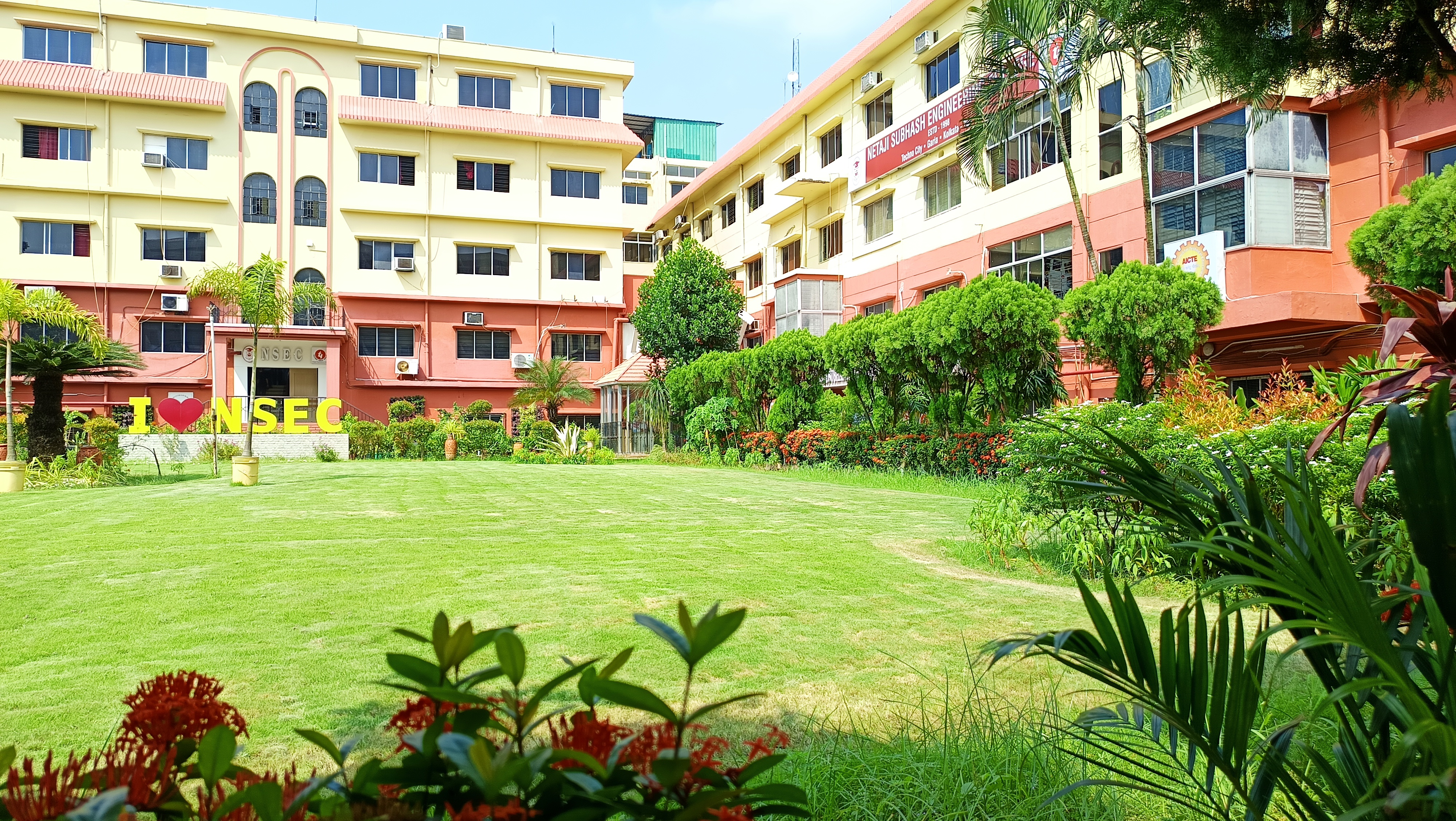
- Type: Private
- Established: 1998
- Affiliations: Maulana Abul Kalam Azad University of Technology
- Principal: Prof. A K Ghosh
- Director: Hrishikesh Mandal
- Location: Kolkata, West Bengal, India
- Campus: Suburban
- Colors: Royal Blue & White
- Website: www.nsec.ac.in
- Logo of Netaji Subhash Engineering College. Kolkata

Netaji Subhash Engineering College or NSEC is a graduate and undergraduate engineering college of eastern India located in Kolkata, West Bengal, India. Established in 1998, it is situated at Techno City, Panchpota, Garia in the southern part of Kolkata. The college is affiliated to the Maulana Abul Kalam Azad University of Technology (formerly known as West Bengal University of Technology) and is approved by AICTE. This institute is situated in Kolkata in the Indian State of West Bengal.

== Academics ==
=== NBA and TEQIP ===
In 2005, the college was given accreditation from the National Board of Accreditation (NBA) for B.Tech in Computer Science and Engineering, Electronics and Communication Engineering, and Electrical Engineering. In April 2008 the same accreditation was given for information technology. The college was also selected for an educational grant from the World Bank in its Technical Education Quality Improvement Program (TEQIP) as one of the few institutes in West Bengal. NSEC ranked Second in Project Implementation of TEQIP (following Jadavpur University which achieved first place in West Bengal).

=== Industry Academia Partnership Initiative ===
In 2008, Infosys launched the Campus Connect program, an industry-academia partnership initiative, with 60 colleges in India. The college was one of the institutes that was selected for the program and as of 2015, the program is still active.

== Organisation and administration ==
Department of Computer Sciences

- Doctoral Program (PhD) in Cellular Automata, Web Intelligence, Distributed Computing, Neural Networks, Artificial Intelligence, Multimedia Systems and Compiler Design.

Department of Electrical Engineering

- Doctoral program (PhD) in Electrical Power System, Electrical Machines and Control Engineering.

Department of Basic Engineering Sciences

- 3-years undergraduate program covering all branches of Science, the knowledge of which are required in the field of Engineering.

== Student life ==
=== Phoenix, the Official Tech Club ===
The history of PHOENIX, the official Tech Club of the college, dates back to 2006, when seven students formed a platform that would think beyond the academic courses that everyone studies in college. Thus began Phoenix — the Tech Club. Today, every student of NSEC is essentially a member of Phoenix and the club is well known in other tech colleges of the state. The functioning of Phoenix stands on its various pillars: The PR Team, the Creative Team, the Database Team, the Web Team, the C Team, the Photography Team etc. Today, besides organising the three big events (Avenir – the annual Tech Fest, Brainstormer – The Inter College Quiz Competition and Kurukshetra – the Intra College Debate Competition) Phoenix holds forums. Presently these are: The C Forum, The Robonix Forum, The SSPD forum and the Web Designing Forum. "Come, Let's Rise", is the motto of the club

==== Annual Tech Fest ====
The Annual Tech Fest Avenir is one of the earliest Tech Fests of Kolkata was set up with help from Kshitij of Indian Institute of Technology, Kharagpur. The tech fest has seen participants from almost all major engineering colleges of West Bengal. It started in 2003 with a participation of 100 people. Over the years it has grown enormously with Avenir 2014 seeing participants count of over 4000 from all major engineering colleges of the state but organised once in 4 years.

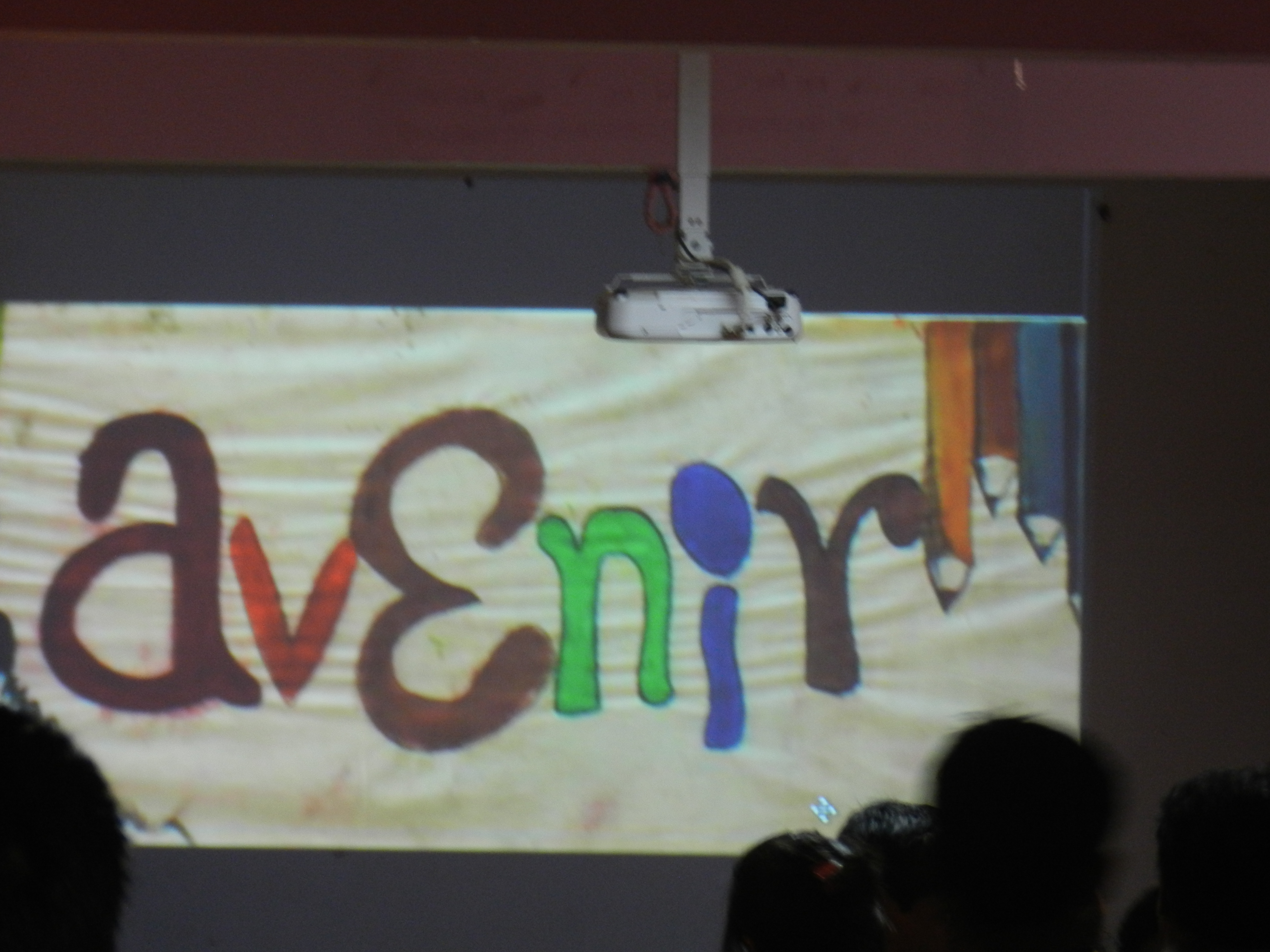
Annual Techno-management fest of NSEC

==== Reunions ====
- Melange - CSE Alumni Meet: The annual alumni meet of the department of Computer Science and Engineering organized by the CSE Alumni Association since 2015.

==== ECE Alumni Association ====
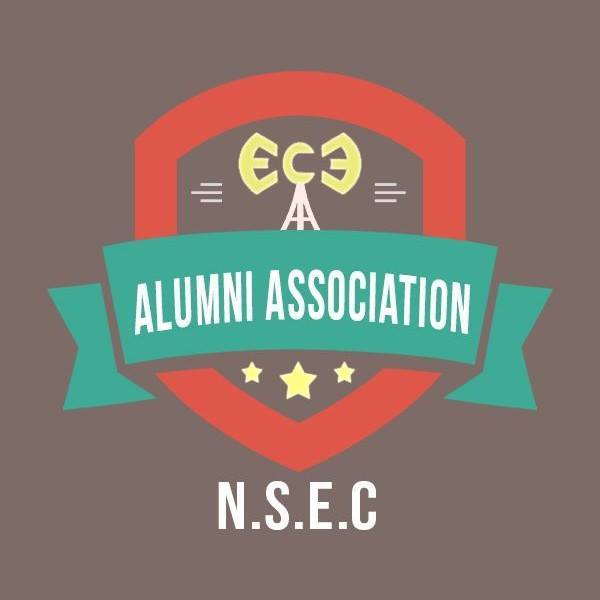
The ECE Alumni Association

The ECE Alumni Association is a voluntary organization of the faculty, ex-students and present students of the department.

==== CSE Alumni Association ====
The CSE Alumni Association is a platform for Alumni, Students & Faculty of CSE department to connect & interact. It was formed to engage the CSE department as well as its global community to support and advance the program's excellence. The association organizes different alumni activity like seminars/talks all around the year. The Association also organizes its annual reunion, "Melange" in the month of October every year.

==== Aikatan: EIE Alumni Association ====
Aikatan, meaning 'Harmony', is the official Alumni association of Applied Electronics and Instrumentation Engineering department of Netaji Subhash Engineering College. It was founded in 2014 to promote interaction among the alumni and the students of the Instrumentation department. The association organizes its annual reunion, "Samhar" in March every year since 2015.

== See also ==
- West Bengal University of Technology
- National Board of Accreditation
