= Panchasayar =

- Neighbourhood in Kolkata (Calcutta)
- Location in Kolkata
- Coordinates: 22.476121°N 88.396516°E
- Country: India
- State: West Bengal
- City: Kolkata
- District: Kolkata
- Metro Station: Kavi Subhash and Satyajit Ray
- Kolkata suburban railway: New Garia
- Municipal Corporation: Kolkata Municipal Corporation
- KMC ward: 109

Population
  - Total: For population see linked KMC ward page
- Time zone: UTC+5:30 (IST)
- PIN: 700 094
- Area code: +91 33
- Lok Sabha constituency: Jadavpur
- Vidhan Sabha constituency: Jadavpur

Panchasayar is a locality of East Kolkata in West Bengal, India. It is a part of Garia.

== Geography ==
=== Police district ===
Panchasayar police station is part of the East division of Kolkata Police. It is located at Srinagar Main Road, New Garia Supermarket, Kolkata-700 094.

== Education ==
Panchasayar Shiksha Niketan, a Bengali-medium co-educational institution, was established in 1988.

== Healthcare ==
Peerless Hospital and B.K.Roy Research Centre, belonging to the Peerless Group, is a 400-bed multi-speciality hospital.
