= New Garia railway station =

Railway station in West Bengal, India

New Garia
- New Garia railway station

General information
- Location: New Garia, Panchasayar, Garia, Kolkata, West Bengal 700094; India
- Coordinates: 22.472728°N 88.397793°E
- Elevation: 9 metres (30 ft)
- System: Kolkata Suburban Railway Station
- Owner: Indian Railways
- Operator: Eastern Railway
- Line: Main line
- Platforms: 3
- Tracks: 3
- Connections: Kavi Subhash

Construction
- Structure type: Standard (on-ground station)
- Parking: Not available
- Cycle facilities: Not available
- Accessible: Not available

Other information
- Status: Functioning
- Station code: NGRI
- Zone(s): Eastern Railway
- Division(s): Sealdah

History
- Opened: 1862; 164 years ago
- Electrified: 1965–66
- Former names: Eastern Bengal Railway
Services
Preceding station	Kolkata Suburban Railway	Following station
Garia towards Sonarpur Junction	Sealdah South Main line	Baghajatin towards Sealdah
Route map
Location

New Garia railway station is a Kolkata Suburban Railway station on the Main line. It is under the jurisdiction of the Sealdah railway division in the Eastern Railway zone of the Indian Railways. It serves the local area of New Garia in Kolkata in the Indian state of West Bengal.

== History ==
In 1862, the Eastern Bengal Railway constructed a 1,676 mm (5 ft 6 in)-wide broad-gauge railway from Sealdah to Sonarpur Junction via New Garia.

== Electrification ==
Electrification from Sealdah to Sonarpur Junction including New Garia was completed with 25 kV AC overhead system in 1965–66.

== Station complex ==
The platform is well sheltered. The station possesses many facilities including water and sanitation. It is well connected to the SH-1. There is a proper approach road to this station.

== Metro ==
Kavi Subhash metro station is an operational station on Line 1 (Blue Line) of the Kolkata Metro, located in New Garia, Kolkata. This metro station is at ground level and located adjacent to New Garia railway station on the Sealdah - Sonarpur section.

Another metro station of the Kavi Subhash-Hemanta Mukhopadhyay section of Kolkata Metro Line 6 is also present at the same location.
