= Hiland Park, Kolkata =

Hiland Park

General information
- Status: Completed
- Location: Eastern Metropolitan Bypass, Kolkata, India
- Construction started: 2000
- Completed: 2003

Height
- Height: 86 metres (282 ft)

Technical details
- Floor count: 28

Design and construction
- Architects: Dulal Mukherjee and Associates
- Developer: CMGL (A joint venture between Hiland group and KMDA)
- Main contractor: Shapoorji Pallonji Group

Hiland Park is a 32.14-acre (130,100 m^{2}) micro-township in Kolkata, India. It is situated on Eastern Metropolitan Bypass at Chak Garia. The micro township features a Residential Complex, which includes a number of recreational facilities, a Shopping Mall named Metropolis Mall and a Social Club called The County.

The Residential complex has 9 building towers and has a mall name metropolis. The towers are named Peak (27 floors, 86 metres (282 ft)), Cape (24 floors, 74 metres (243 ft)), Brook (24 floors, 74 metres (243 ft)), Fjord (21 floors, 65 metres (213 ft)), Bay (21 floors, 65 metres (213 ft)), Glen (18 floors, 56 metres (184 ft)), Isle (18 floors, 56 metres (184 ft)), Ridge (18 floors, 56 metres (184 ft)) and Loch (18 floors, 56 metres (184 ft)). Peak was the tallest residential building in the city until 2007 when South City Towers topped at 117 metres (384 ft). There are a total of 941 residential units comprising standard apartments, duplex and penthouses.

Hiland Park is one of the most important landmarks along Eastern Metropolitan Bypass. The Shopping Mall named Metropolis Mall was launched in 2004 and has a gross leasable area of 175,000 square feet (16,258 m^{2}).

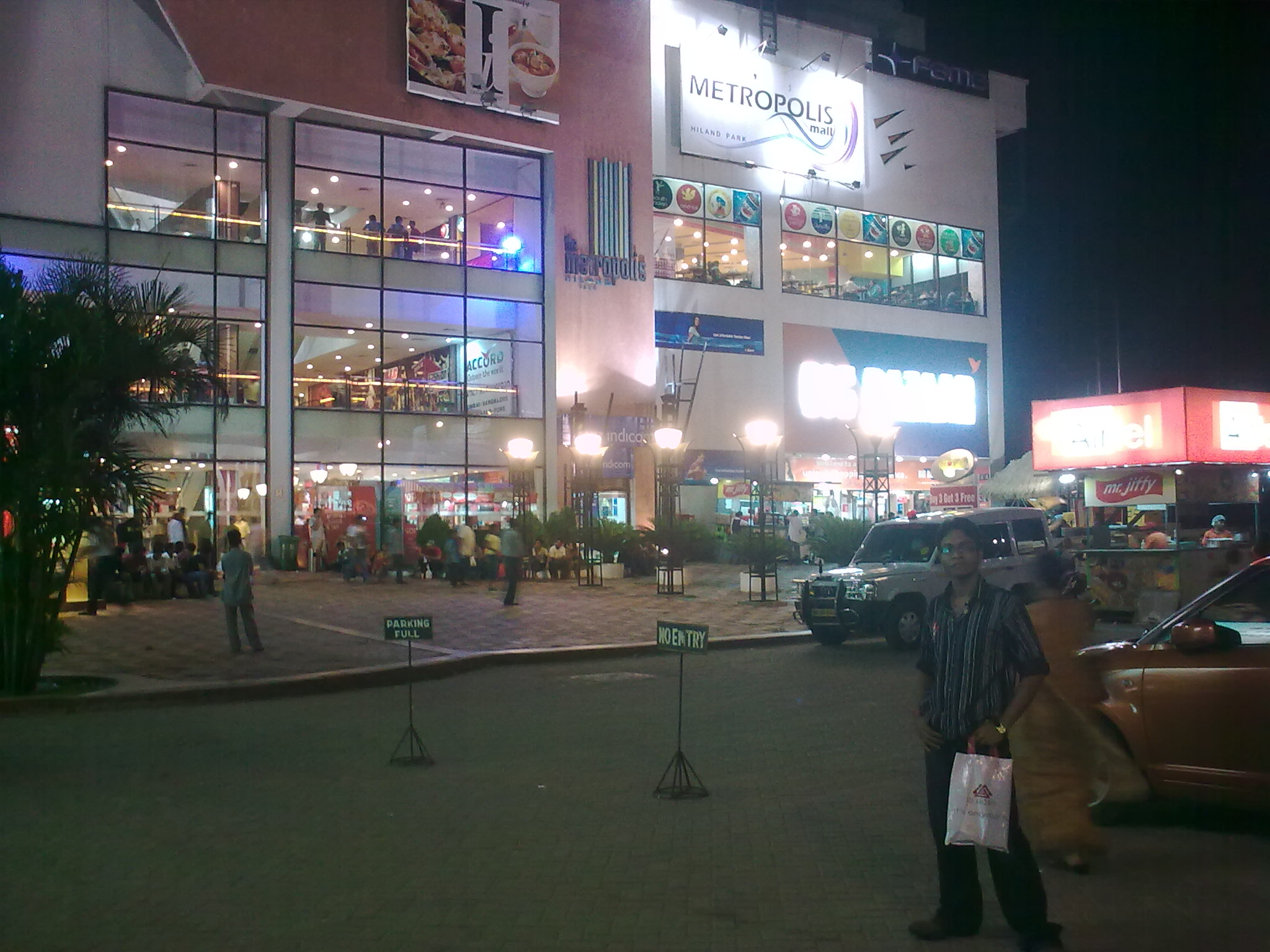
Metropolis Mall opened in 2001, Kolkata
