= Baghajatin railway station =

Railway station in West Bengal, India

Baghajatin
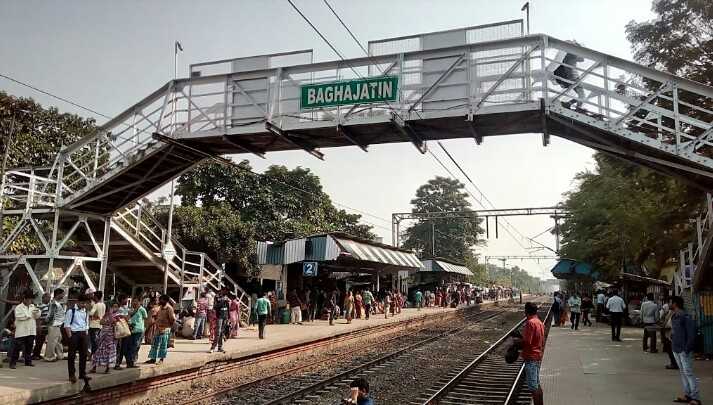
- Baghajatin railway station

General information
- Location: Baghajatin, Kolkata, West Bengal 700086; India
- Coordinates: 22.482840°N 88.386681°E
- Elevation: 9 metres (30 ft)
- System: Kolkata Suburban Railway
- Owner: Indian Railways
- Operator: Eastern Railway
- Line: Main line
- Platforms: 2
- Tracks: 2

Construction
- Structure type: Standard (on-ground station)
- Parking: Not available
- Cycle facilities: Not available
- Accessible: Not available

Other information
- Status: Functioning
- Station code: BGJT
- Zone(s): Eastern Railway
- Division(s): Sealdah

History
- Opened: 1862; 164 years ago
- Electrified: 1965–66
- Former names: Eastern Bengal Railway
Services
Preceding station	Kolkata Suburban Railway	Following station
New Garia towards Sonarpur Junction	Sealdah South Main line	Jadavpur towards Sealdah
Route map
Location

Baghajatin railway station is a Kolkata Suburban Railway station on the Main line. It is under the jurisdiction of the Sealdah railway division in the Eastern Railway zone of the Indian Railways. It serves the local area of Baghajatin in Kolkata in the Indian state of West Bengal.

== History ==
In 1862, the Eastern Bengal Railway constructed a 1,676 mm (5 ft 6 in)-wide broad-gauge railway from Sealdah to Sonarpur Junction via Baghajatin.

== Electrification ==
Electrification from Sealdah to Sonarpur Junction including Baghajatin was completed with 25 kV AC overhead system in 1965–66.

== Station complex ==
The platform is well sheltered. The station possesses many facilities including water and sanitation. It is well connected to the SH-1. There is a proper approach road to this station.
