= Kavi Subhash metro station =

Kolkata Metro's Blue & Orange Line interchange and terminal station

Kavi Subhash
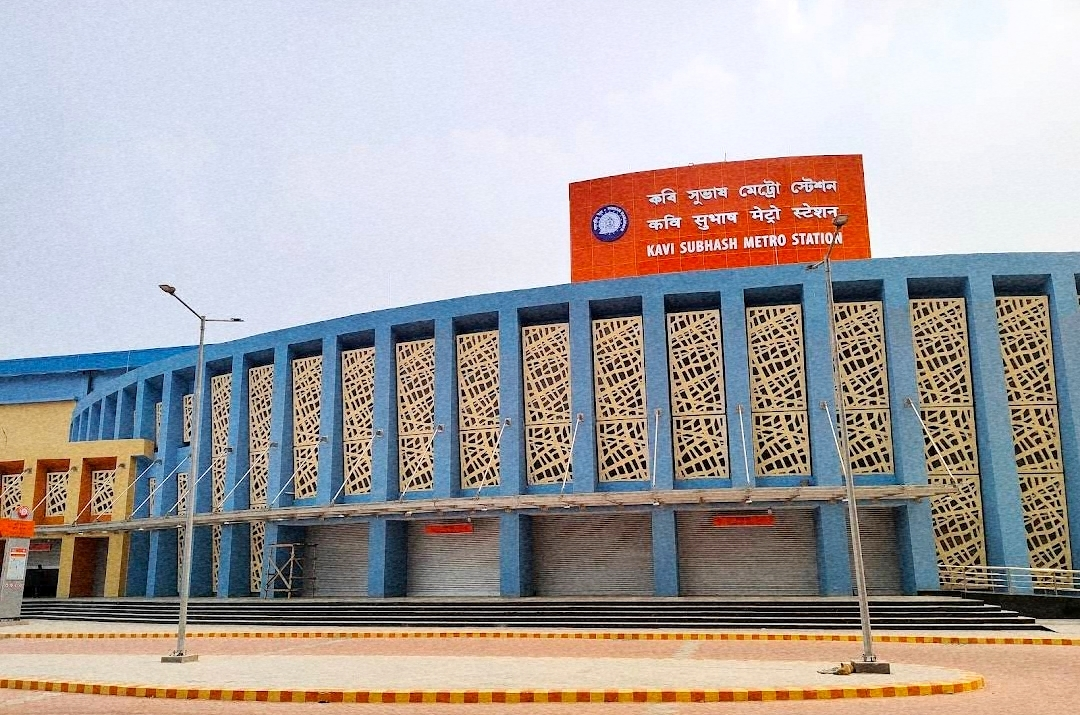
- Kavi Subhash metro Station new complex

General information
- Location: Panchasayar Main Rd, Tentulberia; Rajpur Sonarpur, South 24 Parganas; West Bengal, 700094; India
- Coordinates: 22.47234°N 88.39828°E
- System: Kolkata Metro
- Operator: Metro Railway, Kolkata
- Lines: Orange Line; Blue Line
- Platforms: 4 (2 side platforms and 1 Spanish solution)
- Tracks: 4
- Connections: New Garia: Sealdah South

Construction
- Structure type: At-Grade
- Parking: Yes
- Accessible: Yes

Other information
- Station code: Blue Line : KKVS; Orange Line : KKSO

History
- Opened: Blue Line : 7 October 2010; 15 years ago; Orange Line : 6 March 2024; 2 years ago
- Closed: Blue Line : 28 July 2025; 12 months ago
- Former names: New Garia

Services
Preceding station	Kolkata Metro	Following station
Terminus	Orange Line	Satyajit Ray towards Beleghata
Shahid Khudiram towards Dakshineswar	Blue Line (Closed indefinitely)	Terminus
Route map
Location

Kavi Subhash (formerly known as New Garia) is the at-grade southern terminus and interchange metro station of the north–south corridor (Blue Line) and Bypass Corridor (Orange Line) of Kolkata Metro in New Garia, Kolkata, West Bengal, India. (Note: Due to reconstruction of Blue line's station complex, the trains of this line have been truncated temporarily until Shahid Khudiram metro station. Therefore, the interchange with the Orange Line is currently not feasible.) It is named after poet Subhash Mukhopadhyay. This station was opened to the public on the day of Mahalaya in 2010.

This metro station is at ground level and located adjacent to New Garia railway station on the Sealdah - Sonarpur section.

After a lot of hardships and developmental work, the Kavi Subhash–Hemanta Mukhopadhyay section of Orange Line was inaugurated on 6 March 2024.

On 28 July 2025, cracks were detected in the last four columns of the Line-1's Up platform. The north–south platforms of the station was closed to passengers as a safety measure and the Blue Line trains were terminated at Shahid Khudiram metro station. However, the empty rakes continued to run up to the station for reversal and maintenance at its depot. On investigation, it was found that the columns supporting the platforms were weakened beyond repair. Metro authorities decided to raze the entire north–south complex of the station (keeping the tracks intact) and rebuild it. E-tenders were floated, and the work was estimated to take up to ten months to complete.

== Station layout ==
fob	Foot overbridge	Crossover
Orange Line	Side platform, doors will open on the left
Orange Line	Platform 3	Towards Beleghata (Satyajit Ray) →
Orange Line	Island platform, doors will open on both sides
Orange Line	Platform 4	← Alighting only
Orange Line	Side platform, doors will open on the left
M	Mezzanine	Fare control, station agent, ticket/token, shops, Interchange
B	Basement	Car Parking
Blue Line	Side platform, doors will open on the left
Blue Line	Platform 2	Alighting only →
Blue Line	Platform 1	← Towards Dakshineswar (Shahid Khudiram)
Blue Line	Side platform, doors will open on the left
G	Street Level	Exit/entrance, fare control, station agent, Metro Card vending machines, crossover

== Connections ==
=== Bus ===
Bus route numbers 1B, 206, S116 (Mini), S124 (Mini) etc. serve the station.

=== Train ===
It is connected to New Garia railway station on the Sealdah South Mainline.

=== Air ===
Netaji Subhash Chandra Bose International Airport is connected via VIP Road and EM Bypass, at a distance of 24.3 km.

== Gallery ==
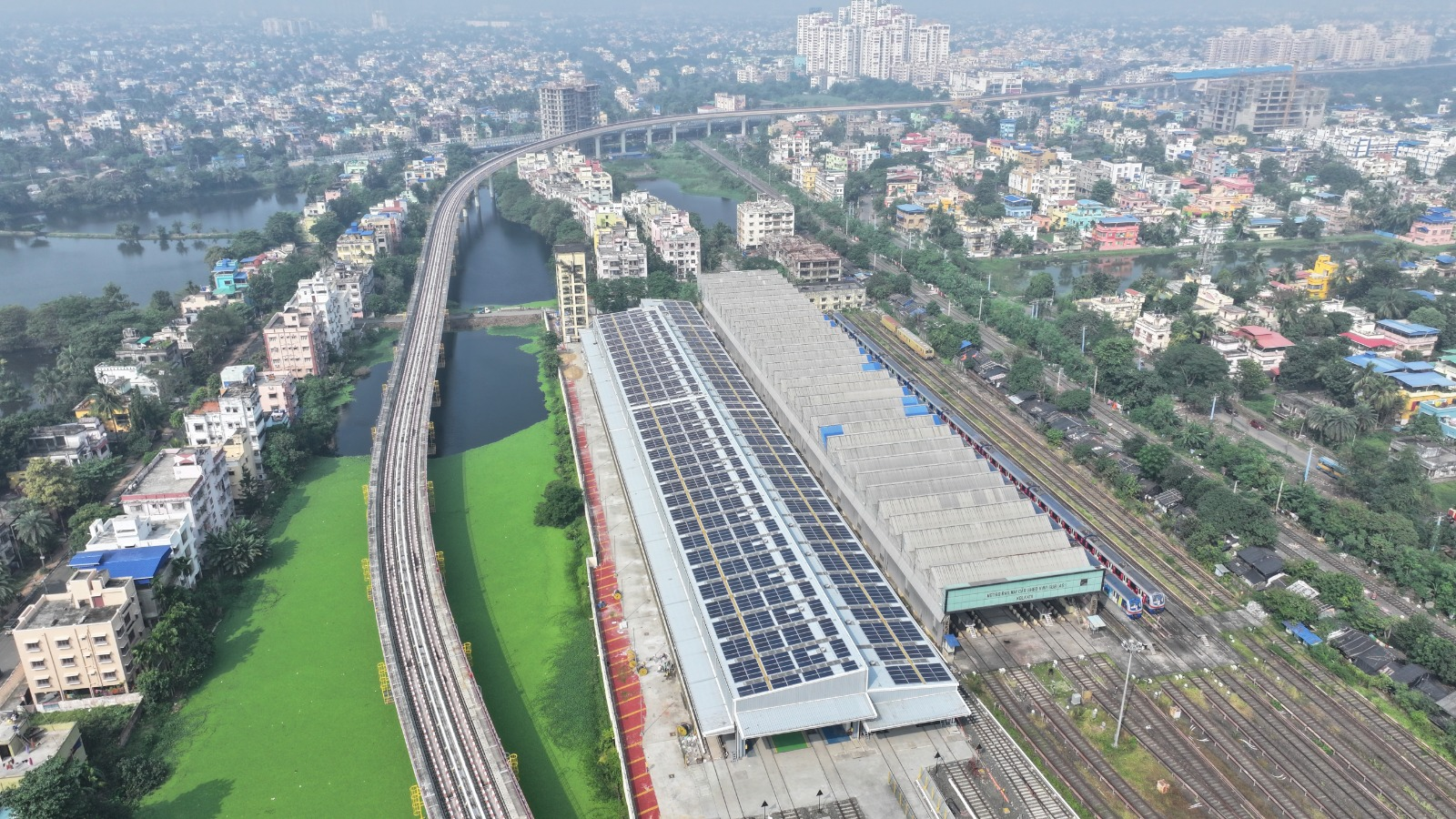
Aerial view of the New Garia Depot (Kavi Subhash Carshed) Blue Line and the Orange Line viaduct

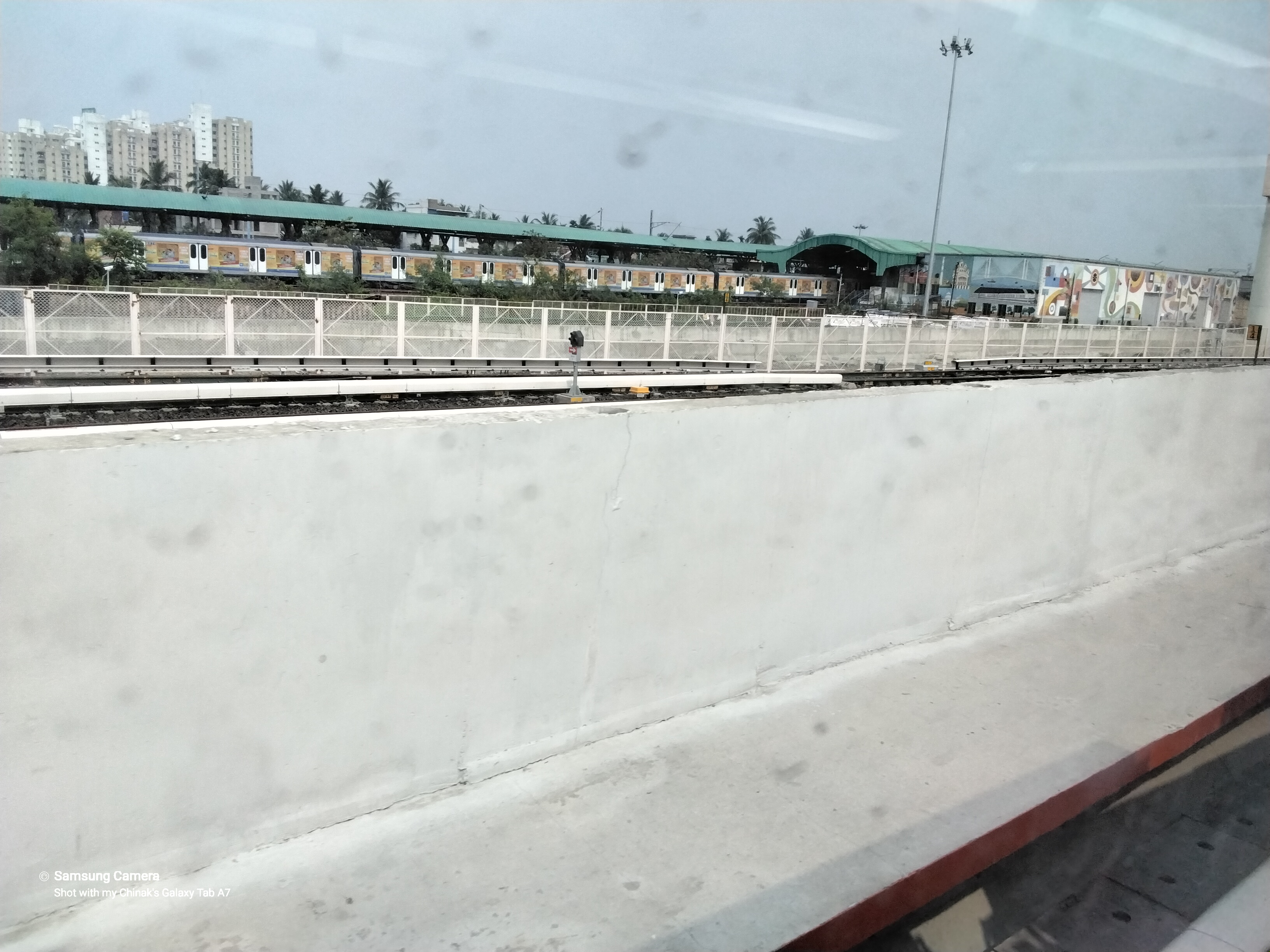
Kavi Subhash metro station Blue Line Complex as seen from Orange Line

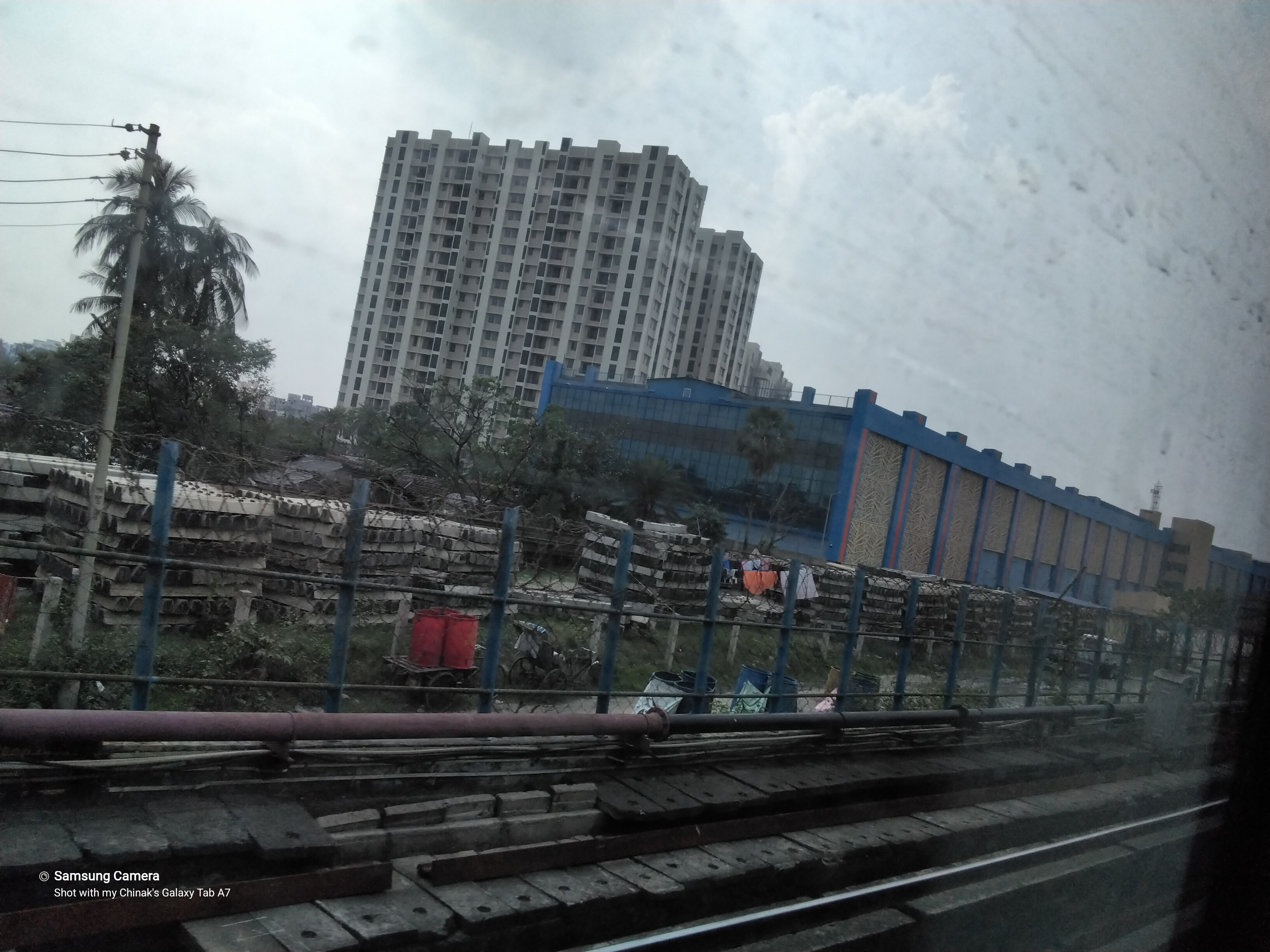
Kavi Subhash metro station Orange Line Complex as seen from Blue Line

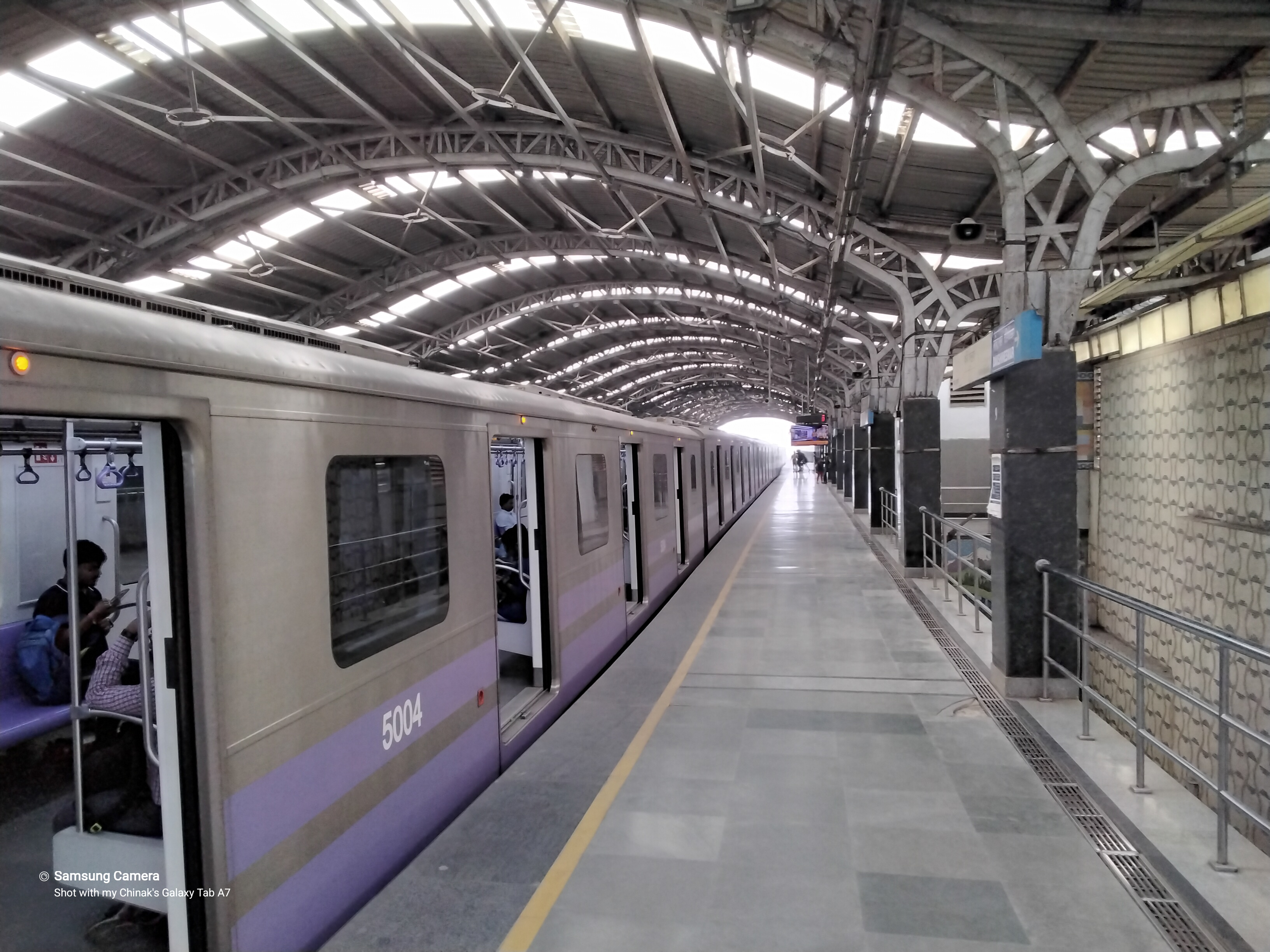
Kavi Subhash metro station Blue Line Complex platform

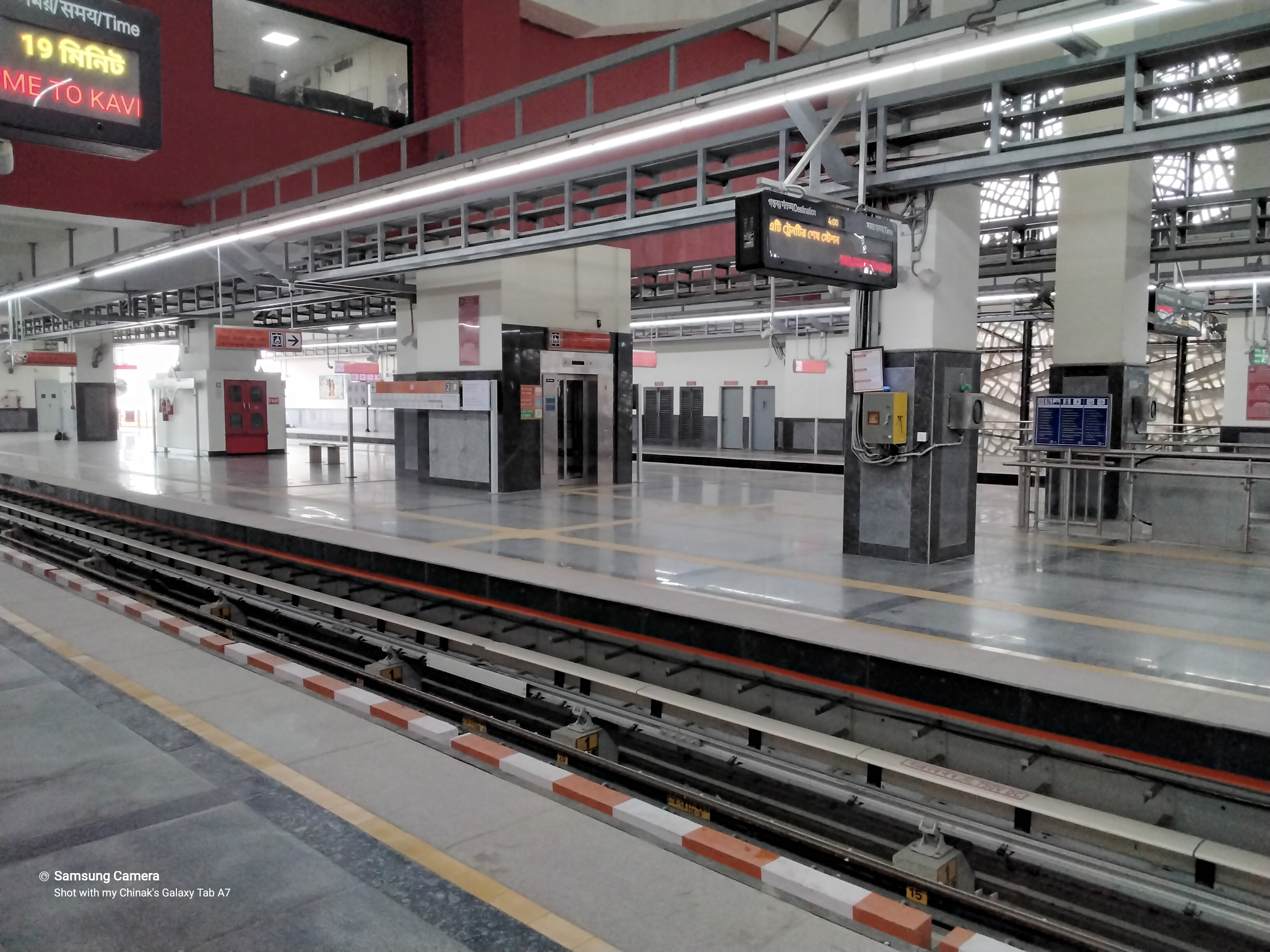
Kavi Subhash metro station Orange Line Complex platform

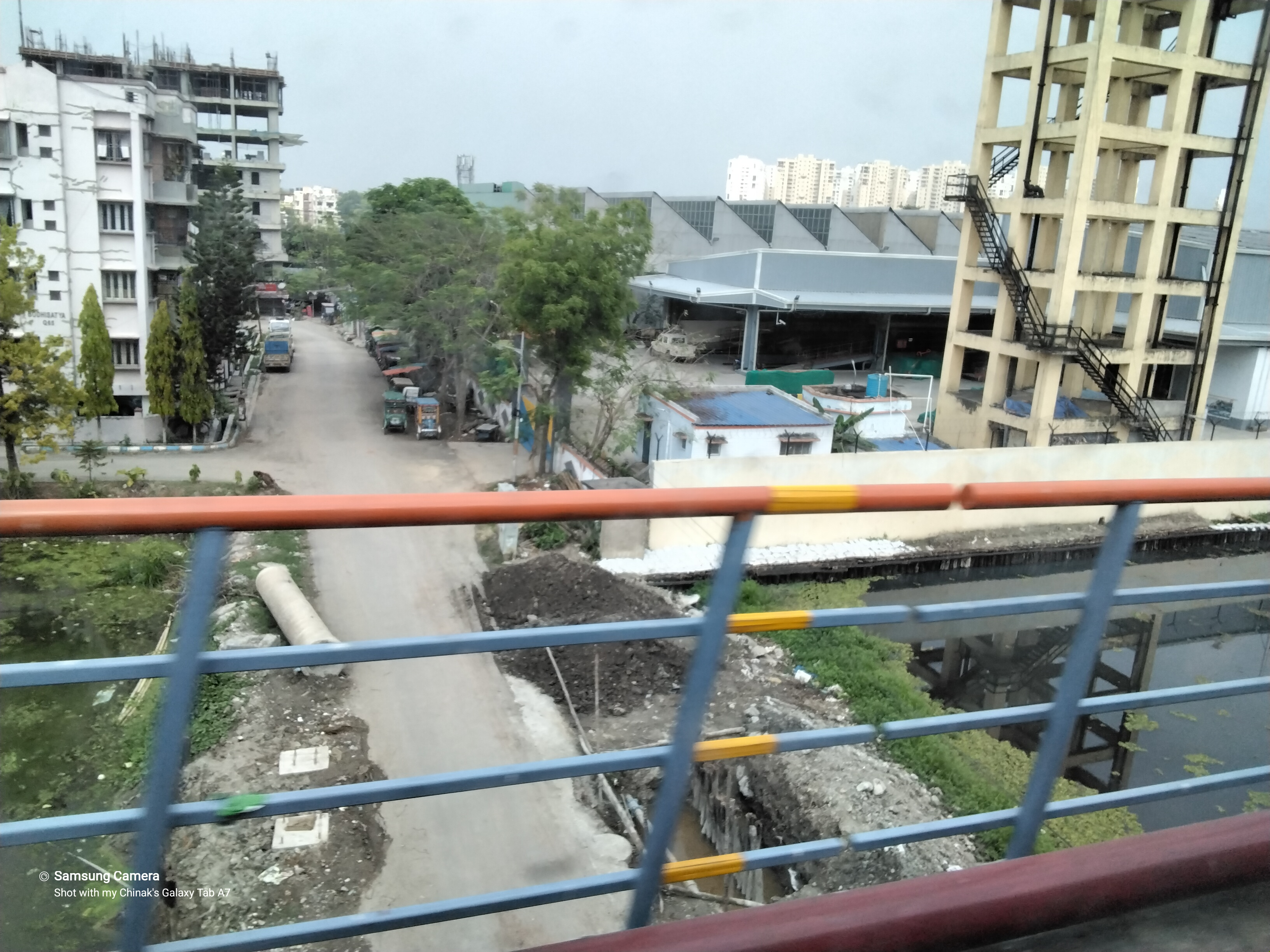
Kavi Subhash metro station depot and carshed as seen from Orange Line

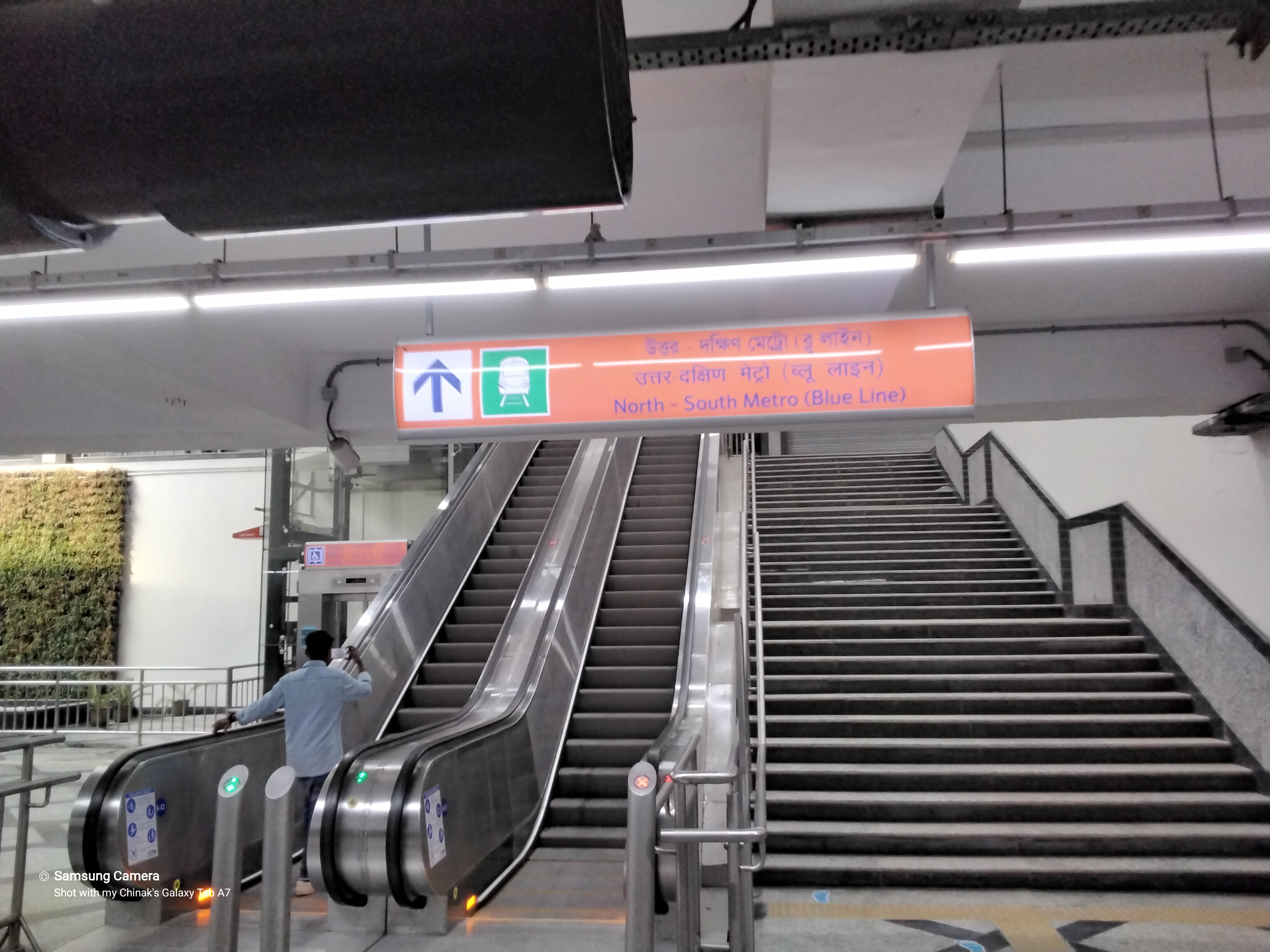
Kavi Subhash metro station interchange

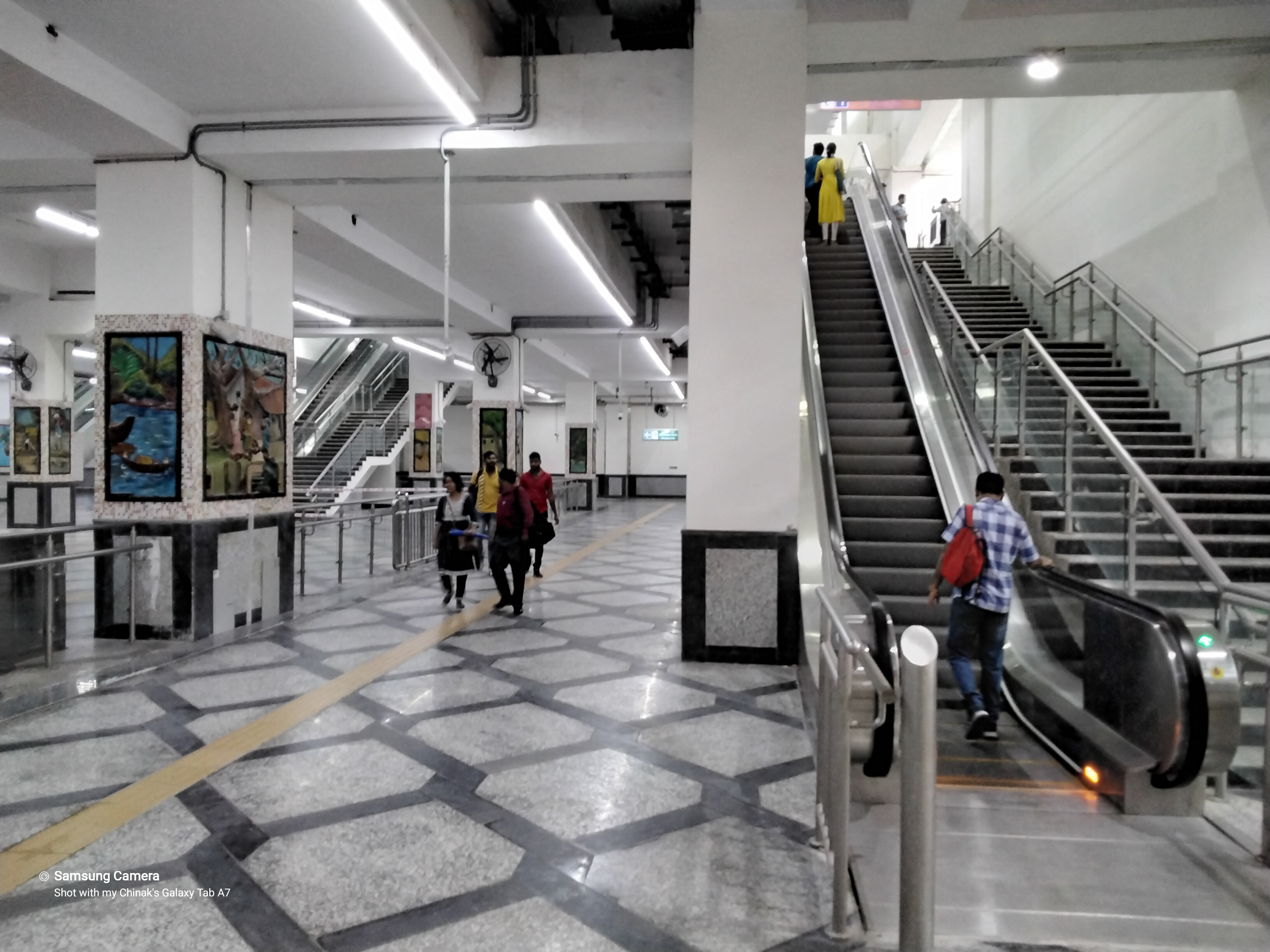
Kavi Subhash metro stationinterchange as seen from Orange Line Complex

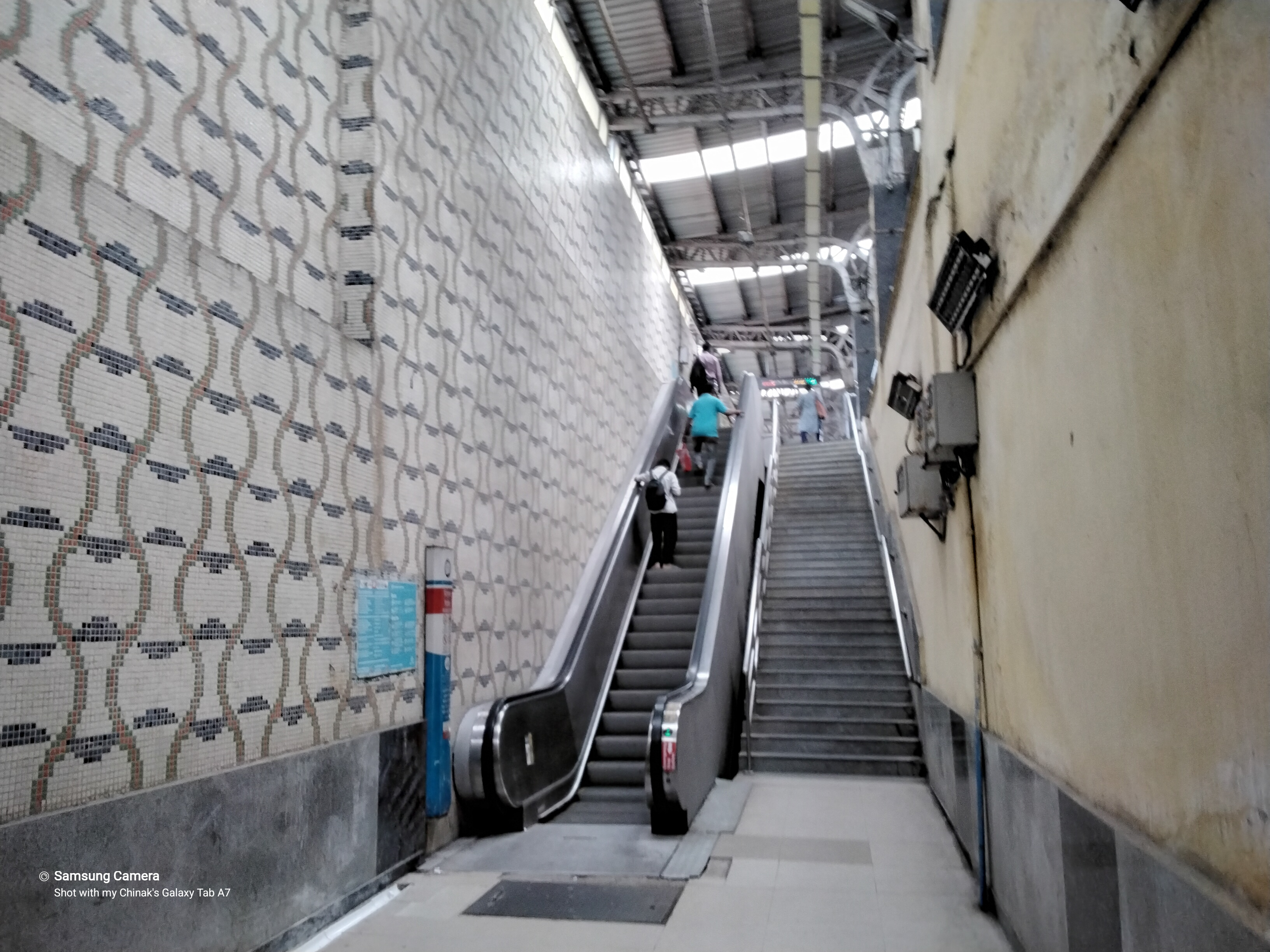
Kavi Subhash metro station interchange as seen from Blue Line Complex

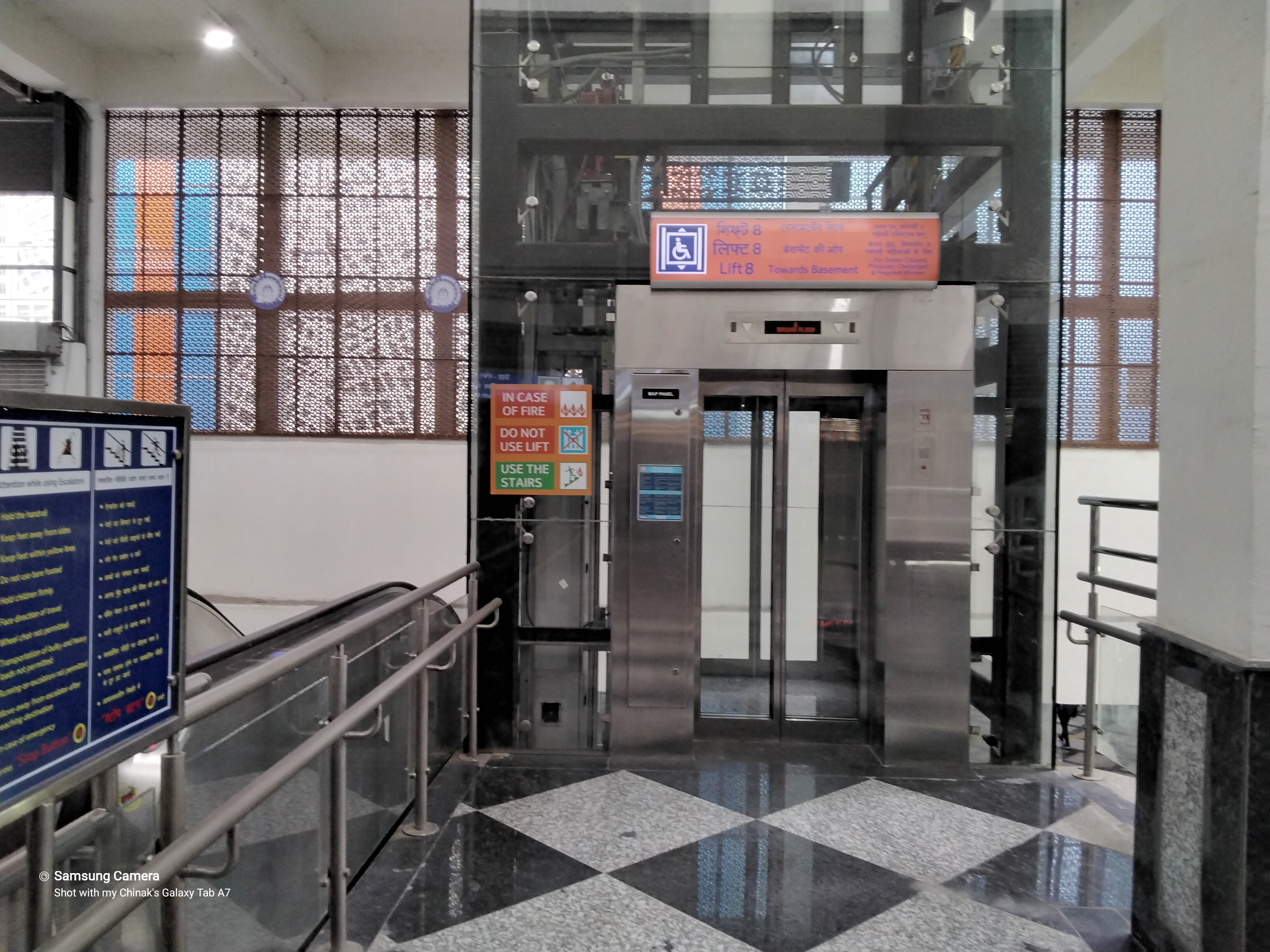
Kavi Subhash metro station interchange lift

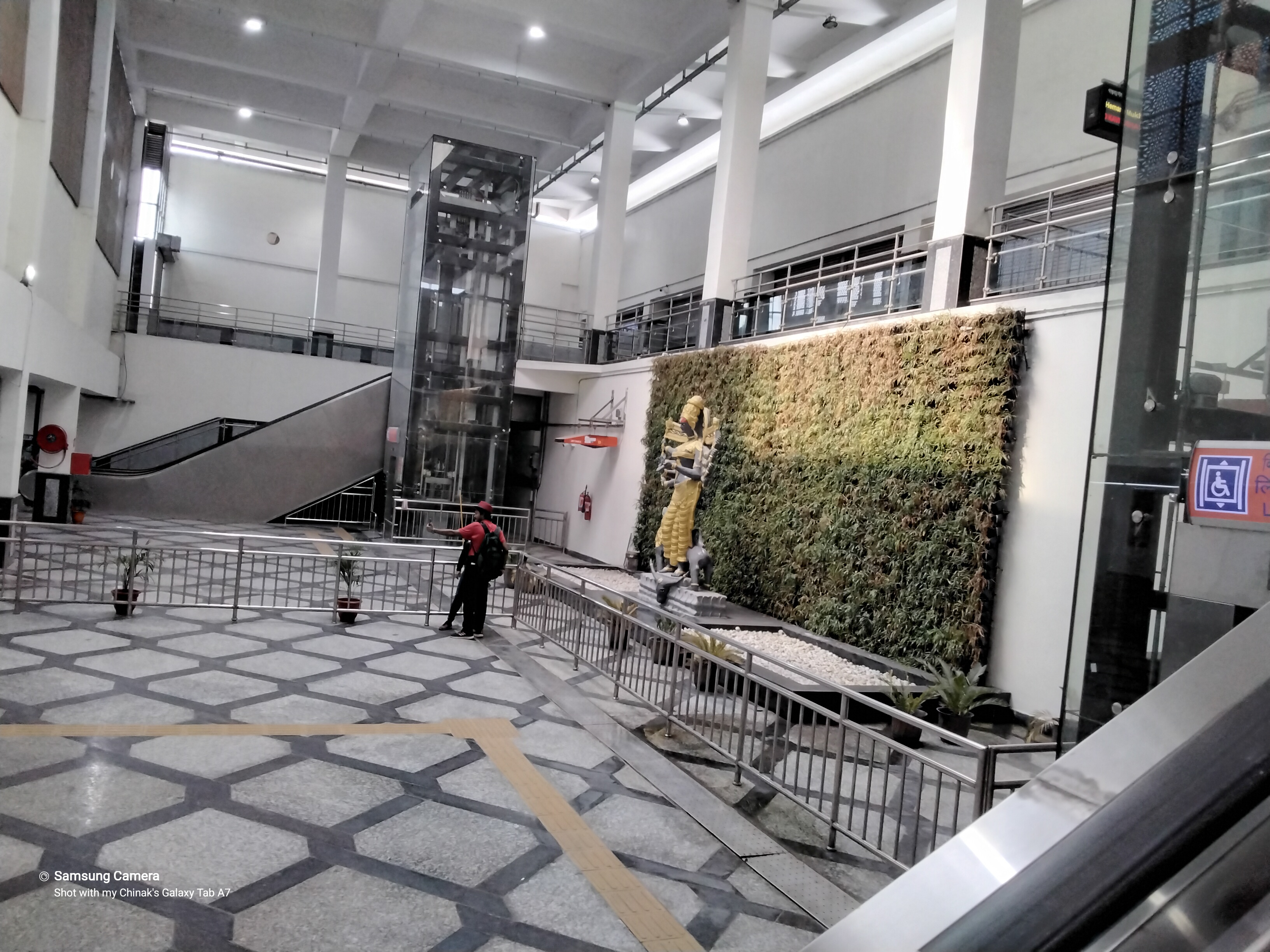
Goddess Durga statue in Kavi Subhash metro station interchange

== See also ==
- List of Kolkata Metro stations
