= List of data centres in West Bengal =

The following is a list of data centres in West Bengal.

== List ==
City/ metropolitan area	Provider/ Operator	Details	Location	Status	Ref(s)
Kolkata metropolitan area	NTT	Capacity: 40 MW; Area: 6,00,000 sqft	BSV, AA-II, New Town	Operational	
Kolkata metropolitan area	Sify	Capacity: 2 MW; Rack space: 350	New Town AA-I	Operational	
Kolkata metropolitan area	STT	Capacity: 2.4 MW; Area: 20,000 sqft	Ultadanga, Kolkata	Operational	
Kolkata metropolitan area	STT	Capacity: 6 MW	BSV, AA-II, New Town	Under construction	
Kolkata metropolitan area	National Informatics Centre	Storage: 250 TB; Area: 1200 sqft; Rack space: 20	Nizam Palace, Kolkata	Operational	
Kolkata metropolitan area	Tata Communications	Capacity: 6 MW	Ultadanga, Kolkata	Operational	
Kolkata metropolitan area	Webel	New West Bengal SDC; Tier-III+; Area: 12000+ sqft; Storage:1.5 PB	Webel Bhaban, Salt Lake Sector-V	Operational	
Kolkata metropolitan area	Webel	Old West Bengal SDC; Tier-II; Area: 4300 sqft	Manibhandar building, Webel Complex, Salt Lake Sector-V	Operational since 2009	
Kolkata metropolitan area	Ricoh India		SALTLEC, Salt Lake Sector-V	Operational	
Kolkata metropolitan area	Reliance Industries	Area: 525,000 sqft	BSV, AA-II, New Town	Under construction	
Kolkata metropolitan area	Adani Enterprises	Hyperscale; Area: 525,000 sqft	BSV, AA-II, New Town	Under construction	
Kolkata metropolitan area	L&T	Hyperscale; Area: 525,000 sqft	BSV, AA-II, New Town	Planned	
Kolkata metropolitan area	Airtel Nxtra	Capacity: 25 MW; Area:150,000 sqft	BSV, AA-II, New Town	Under construction	
Kolkata metropolitan area	Hiranandani Group	Capacity: 250 MW	Uttarpara, Hooghly	Planned	
Kolkata metropolitan area	Universal Success Enterprises	Capacity: 27MW	BSV, AA-II, New Town	Planned	
Kolkata metropolitan area	Techno Electric & Engg	Capacity: 20MW	BSV, AA-II, New Town	Planned	
Kolkata metropolitan area	CtrlS		BSV, AA-II, New Town	Planned	
Purulia	Webel	Capacity: 6MW	Purulia	Operational	
Siliguri	Webel	Capacity: 20MW	Siliguri	Under construction	
