= FinTech Hub =

Business district in Greater Kolkata, India

- Business district
- Interactive map of FinTech Hub
- Country: India
- State: West Bengal
- District: North 24 Parganas
- Region: Kolkata Metropolitan Area
- City: New Town
- Division: New Town CBD
- Established: 13 October 2010
- Established as: International Financial Hub
- Relaunched: 2017
- Relaunched as: FinTech Hub Kolkata

Area
  - Total: 28 ha (70 acres)

Language
  - Official: Bengali, English
- Time zone: IST
- Administrative body: West Bengal Housing Infrastructure Development Corporation
- Rapid transit: Kolkata Metro Orange Line
- Based on: Financial technology
- Website: bengalfintechhub.in

FinTech Hub (formerly known as International Financial Hub) is a financial, commercial centre and business district located in New Town city, which lies outskirts of Kolkata under its metropolitan area in the state of West Bengal, India. The hub has the presence of a large number of banking, financial companies and legal institutions. Many major companies have their headquarters, offices and training centres operational or under construction.

== History and timeline ==
=== International Financial Hub ===
In 2010, inspired by the Bandra Kurla Complex in Mumbai and to turn Kolkata into an international financial centre, the then chief minister of West Bengal Buddhadeb Bhattacharjee and finance minister Asim Dasgupta proposed an International Financial Hub on 100 Acres of land in New Town. The union finance minister of that time, Pranab Mukherjee laid the foundation stone of the project on 13 October 2010. The project had a deadline to be completed in five years. State Bank of India, UCO Bank, Punjab National Bank and UTI Mutual Fund stated to invest and agreed to build their offices in the hub.

In 2011, the new chief minister of West Bengal Mamata Banerjee restarted the project and laid the foundation stone again on 10 March 2012. While the previous Government accorded the project to a private company, this time the project was given to HIDCO. Up to 2014, 35.76 Acres were in use and out of 23 plots, 11 plots were booked. Banks and financial institutions like the NIC, State Bank of India, UCO Bank, Punjab National Bank, Union Bank, Bank of Baroda, Allahabad Bank, Corporation Bank, Sriram Credit and West Bengal Financial Corporation and the HIDCO had their offices. In 2014, National Green Tribunal, a legal firm set up their centre.

=== 2017 relaunch as FinTech hub ===
In 2017, the project was relaunched as a FinTech hub. The purpose was to develop financial technology industry in West Bengal. In 2020, 23 financial institutions had their offices setup in the hub. First 10 Acres were identified which was afterwards expanded. On 10 September 2021, HIDCO released an online portal for owing plots easily. Up to September 2021, 48 acres were allotted in 70 Acres. As of 2022, 28 financial and legal institutions have their offices in fintech hub.

== Overview ==
As of 2022, there are 28 financial banking or legal companies in fintech hub.

=== Banking companies ===
Bandhan Bank and Punjab National Bank have their headquarters at the hub. State Bank of India has their largest training centre at the hub. Other banking institutions like UCO Bank, Punjab National Bank also have staff and executive training centres in FinTech hub.

=== Financial organisations ===
National Insurance Company, a leading insurance provider in India has their headquarters in the region. Government institutions like West Bengal Financial Corporation and West Bengal Infrastructure Development Finance Corporation have planned their offices at the hub. Other companies include Sriram Credit, Credit Company, New India Assurance.

=== Vertical City ===
Vertical City is a high-rise, mixed use skyscraper currently under construction. As of early 2024, the building is designed to have 38 stories, a mixture of commercial, startup, and residential spaces, and cost ₹163 crore.

=== Facilities ===
Fintech hub has FAR relaxation up to 6.0 which allows larger floor area construction.

== List of office buildings or institutional centres ==
This is a list of companies which have taken plot in FinTech hub and set up offices/ units/ training centres or financial centres.

Company	Type	Building type	Status (As of June 2023)	Ref(s)
National Insurance Company	Financial	Headquarters	Operational	
State Bank of India	Banking	Strategic and executive training unit	Operational	
Bandhan Bank	Banking	Headquarters	Under construction	
Bandhan Bank	Banking	Office	Under construction	
UCO Bank	Banking	Office	Operational	
UCO Bank	Banking	Strategic and executive training unit	Operational	
Union Bank	Banking	Office	Under construction	
Bank of India	Banking	Office	Under construction	
National Green Tribunal	Legal	Office	Operational	
Karnataka Bank	Banking	Office	Operational	
HDFC Bank	Banking	Headquarters of Eastern India division	Operational	
HDFC Bank	Banking	Currency chest	Under construction	
Directorate of Revenue Intelligence	Government of India agency	Office	Operational	
Institute of Chartered Accountants of India	Financial	Campus	Operational	
Punjab National Bank	Banking	Staff training centre	Under construction	
Oil and Natural Gas Corporation	Energy: Oil and gas	East India headquarters	Under construction	
Canara Bank	Banking	Office	Under construction	
West Bengal Finance Corporation	Government of West Bengal agency	Headquarters	Under construction	
HIDCO	Government of West Bengal agency	Office	Under construction	
West Bengal Infrastructure Development Finance Corporation	Government of West Bengal agency	Headquarters	Under construction	
Axis Bank	Banking	Office	Under construction	
Allahabad Bank	Banking	Office	TBD	
Income Tax Appellate Tribunal	Government of India agency	Office	TBD	
Bank of Baroda	Banking	Office	TBD	
Corporation Bank	Banking	Office	TBD	
Bank of Baroda	Banking	Office	TBD	
Sriram Credit company	Financial	Office	TBD	
Vijaya Bank	Banking	Office	TBD	
Andhra Bank	Banking	Office	TBD	
Syndicate Bank	Banking	Office	TBD	
Indian Bank	Banking	Office	TBD	
New India Assurance	Financial	Office	TBD	
FoxMandal	Legal	Office	TBD	

== Transport ==
Fintech Hub is located on the lines of Biswa Bangla Sarani. Kolkata Metro's Orange Line serves as the rapid transit of the area.

== See also ==
- List of tech parks in Kolkata
- Bengal Silicon Valley Tech Hub
