= List of tech parks and business parks in Kolkata =

List of office buildings, tech parks and business parks in Kolkata

Kolkata along with its metropolitan area, is the main financial and commercial region of East India. Kolkata metropolitan region is one of the seven metro areas in India with a high number of commercial spaces and offices.

Major office hubs of Kolkata are located at Kolkata CBD areas like B.B.D. Bagh, Park Street and PBD areas like Salt Lake Sector-V and New Town CBD.

The following is a list of notable office buildings, tech parks and business parks present in Greater Kolkata. The list does not contain standard office buildings.

== Tech parks ==
Kolkata being the "IT hub of East India", most of the IT and tech parks are located in Salt Lake (officially Bidhannagar) and New Town. Salt Lake Sector-V is the first and prime IT hub of the metropolitan area. Salt Lake Electronics Complex is India's first fully integrated electronics complex, formed by Webel. The oldest IT building in West Bengal as well as East India was constructed here in 1988 which is the SDF Building, which was planned as an electronics building but later upgraded to IT.

New Town contains some of the biggest IT, AI and business parks in India. The biggest campus of TCS in East India is located here. New Town also contains tech parks which come under Bengal Silicon Valley Tech Hub and Fintech Hub.

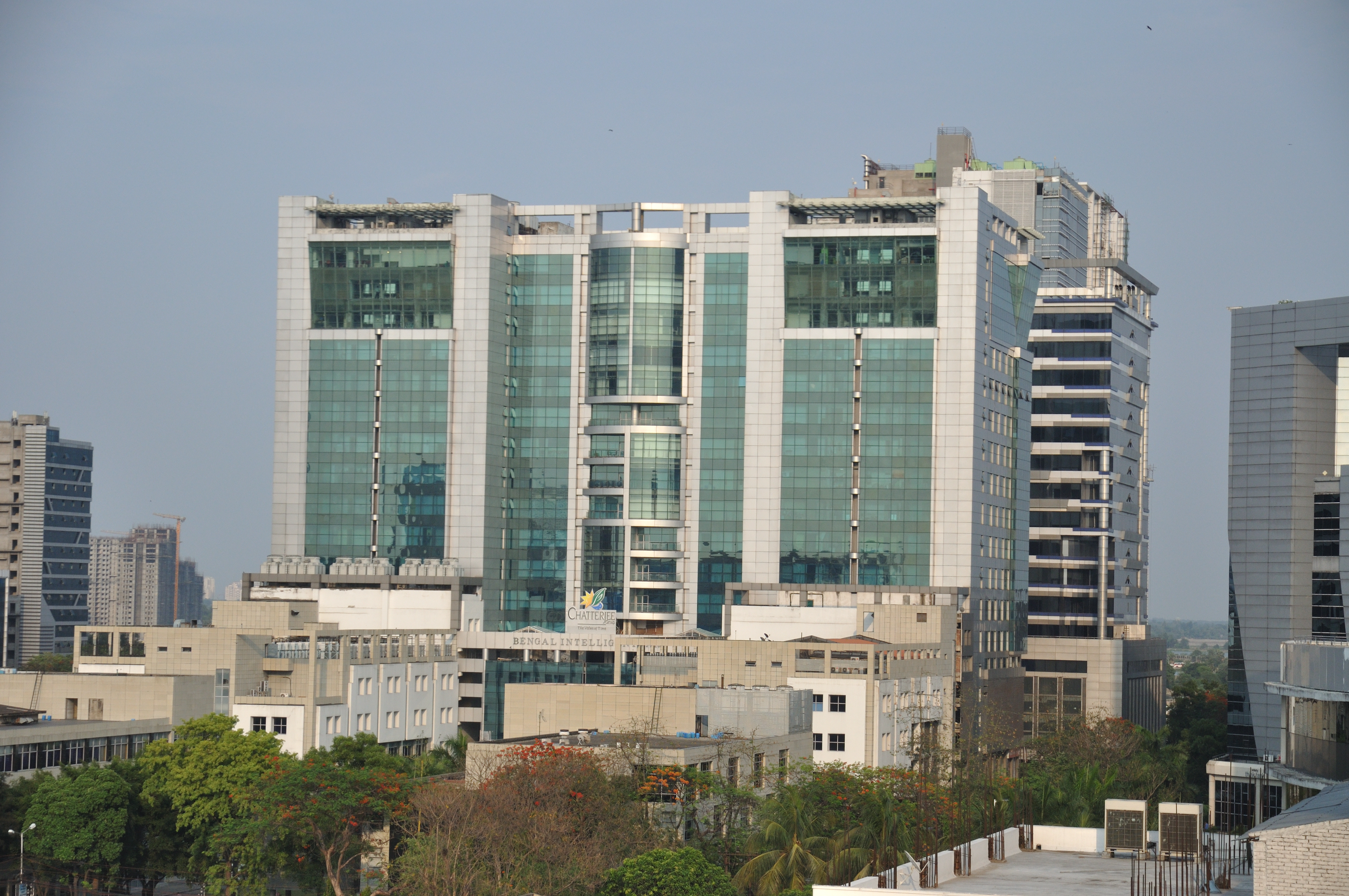
Bengal Intelligent Park

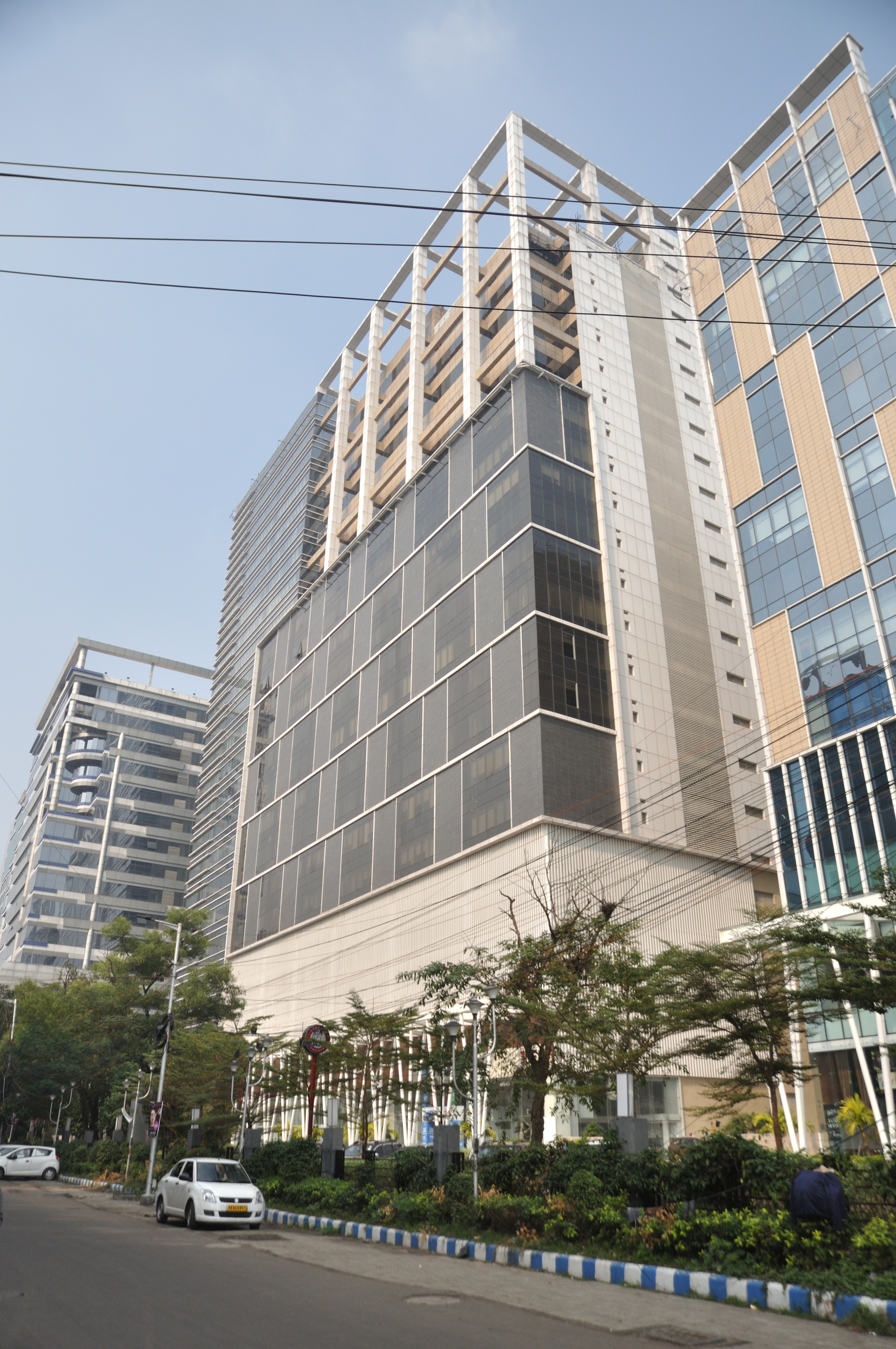
Srijan Tech Park

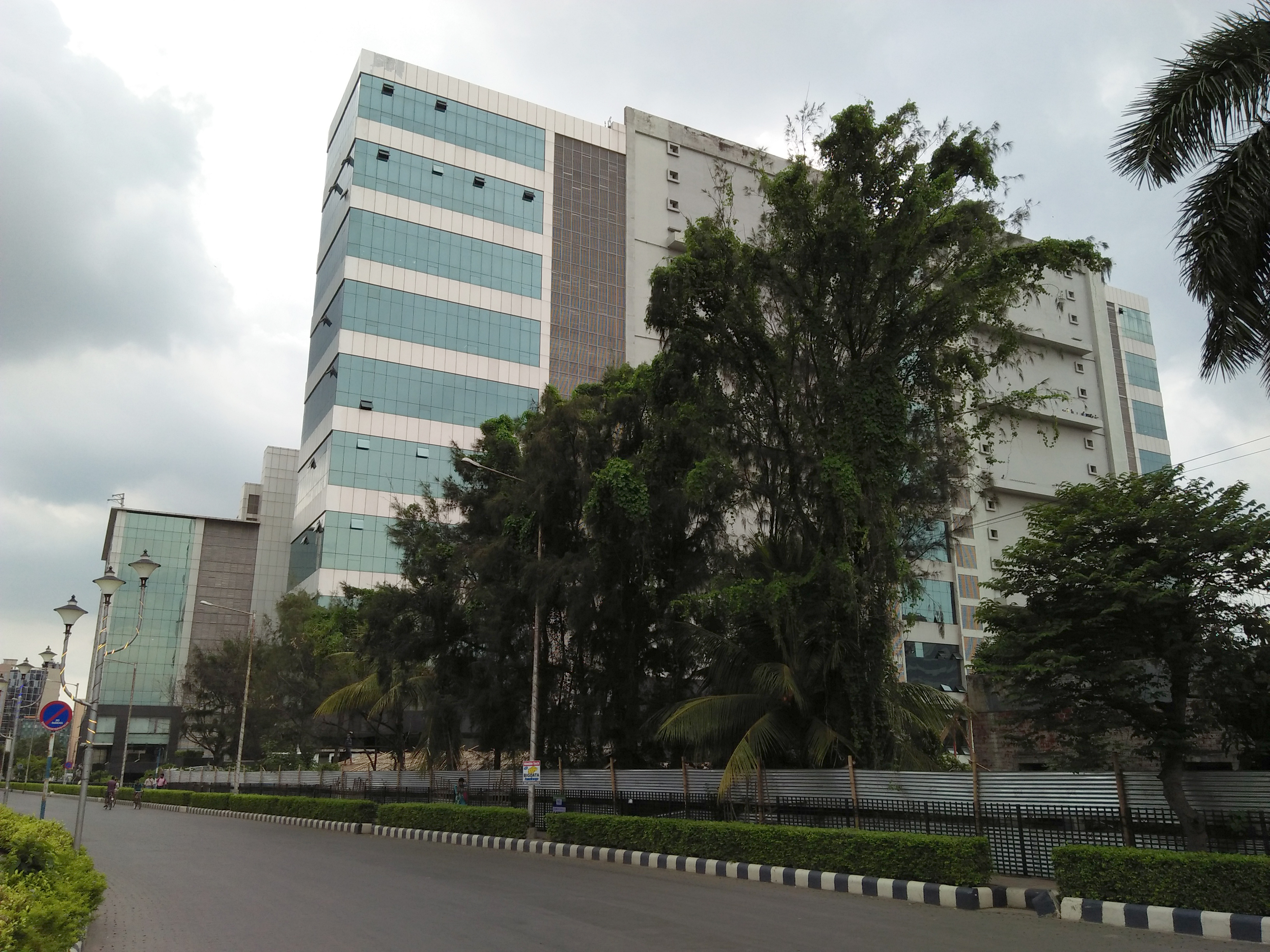
Godrej Waterside

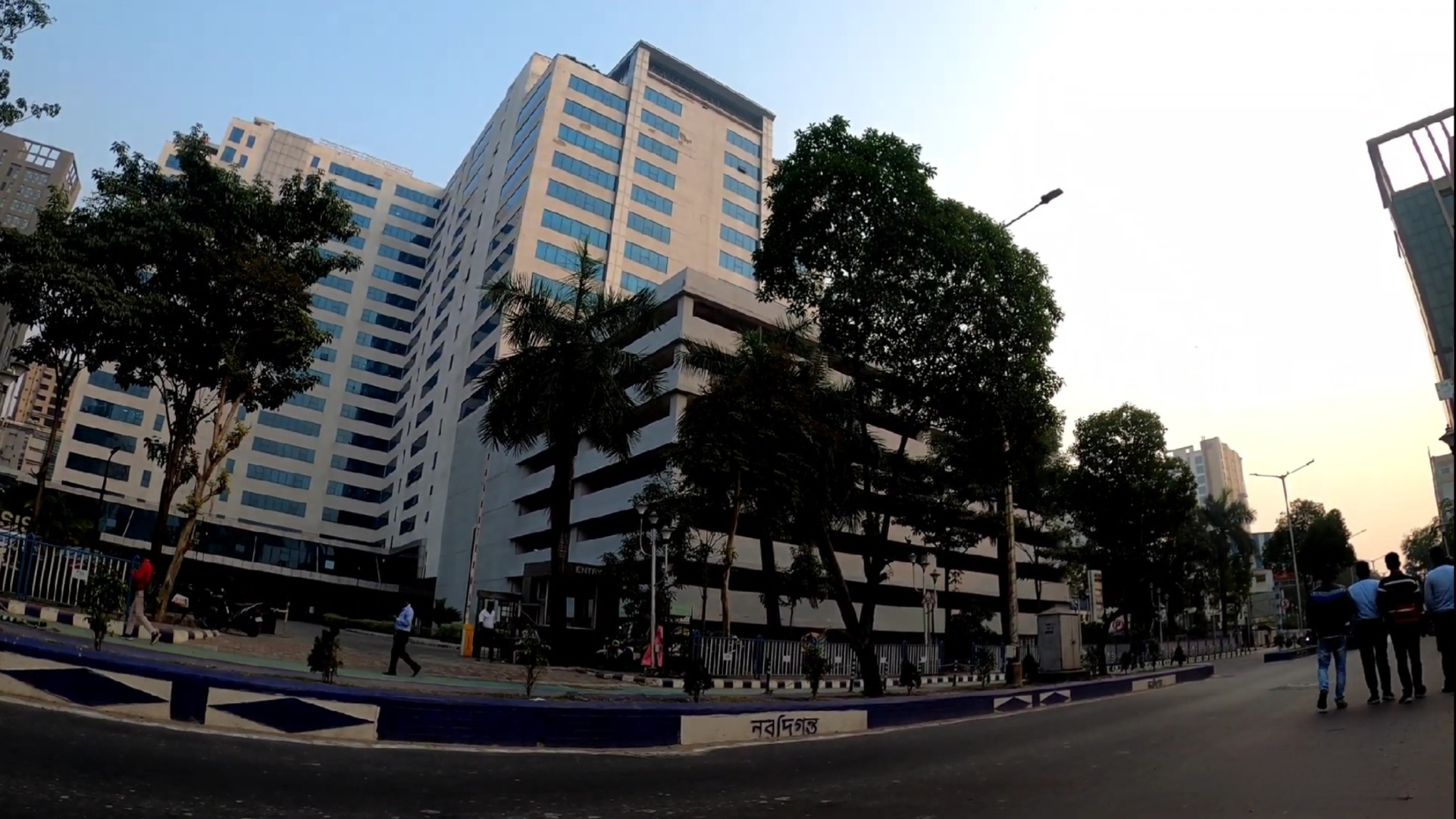
Godrej Genesis

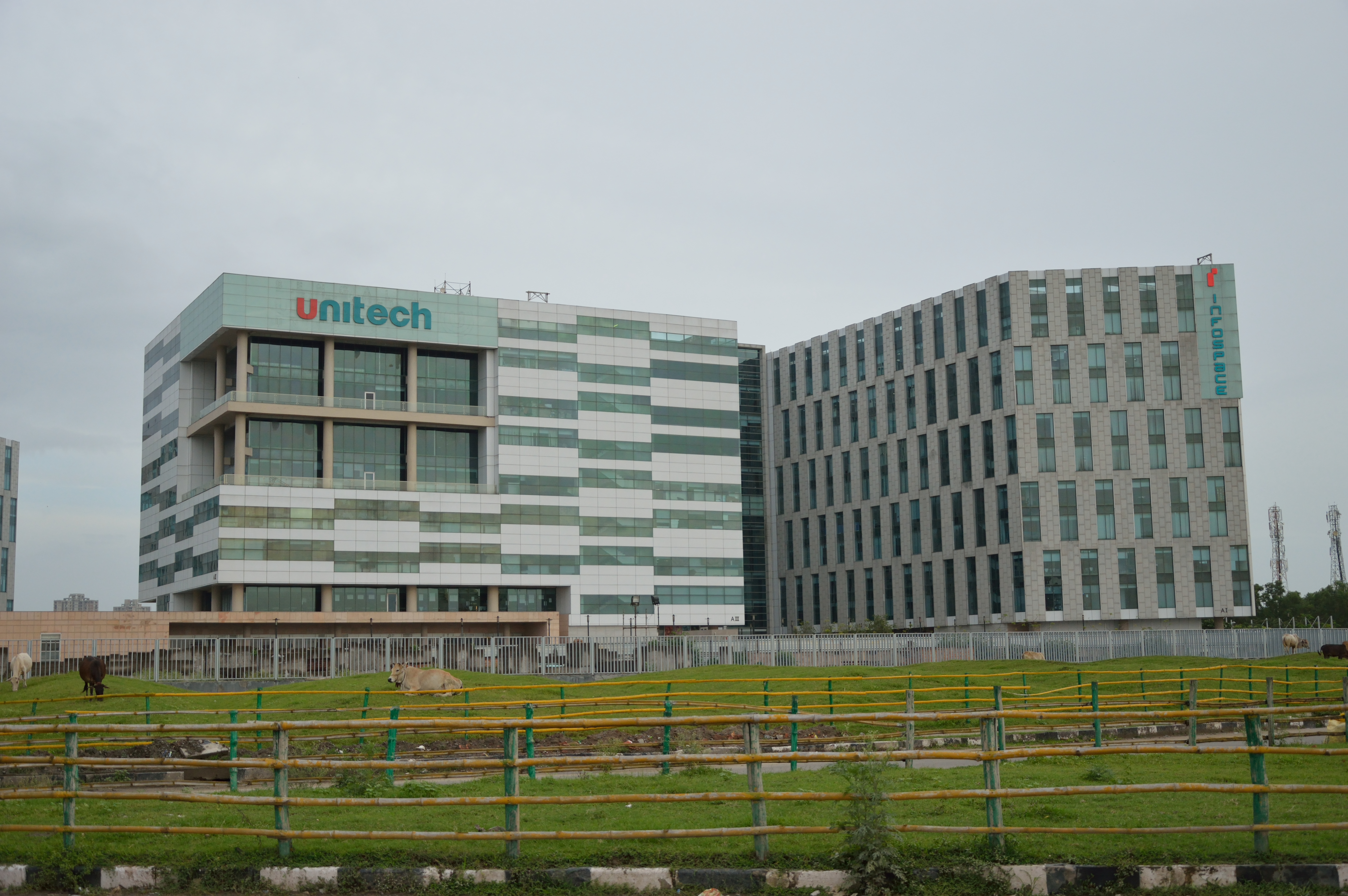
Unitech Infospace Hi-Tech Park (also known as Candor Tech Space)

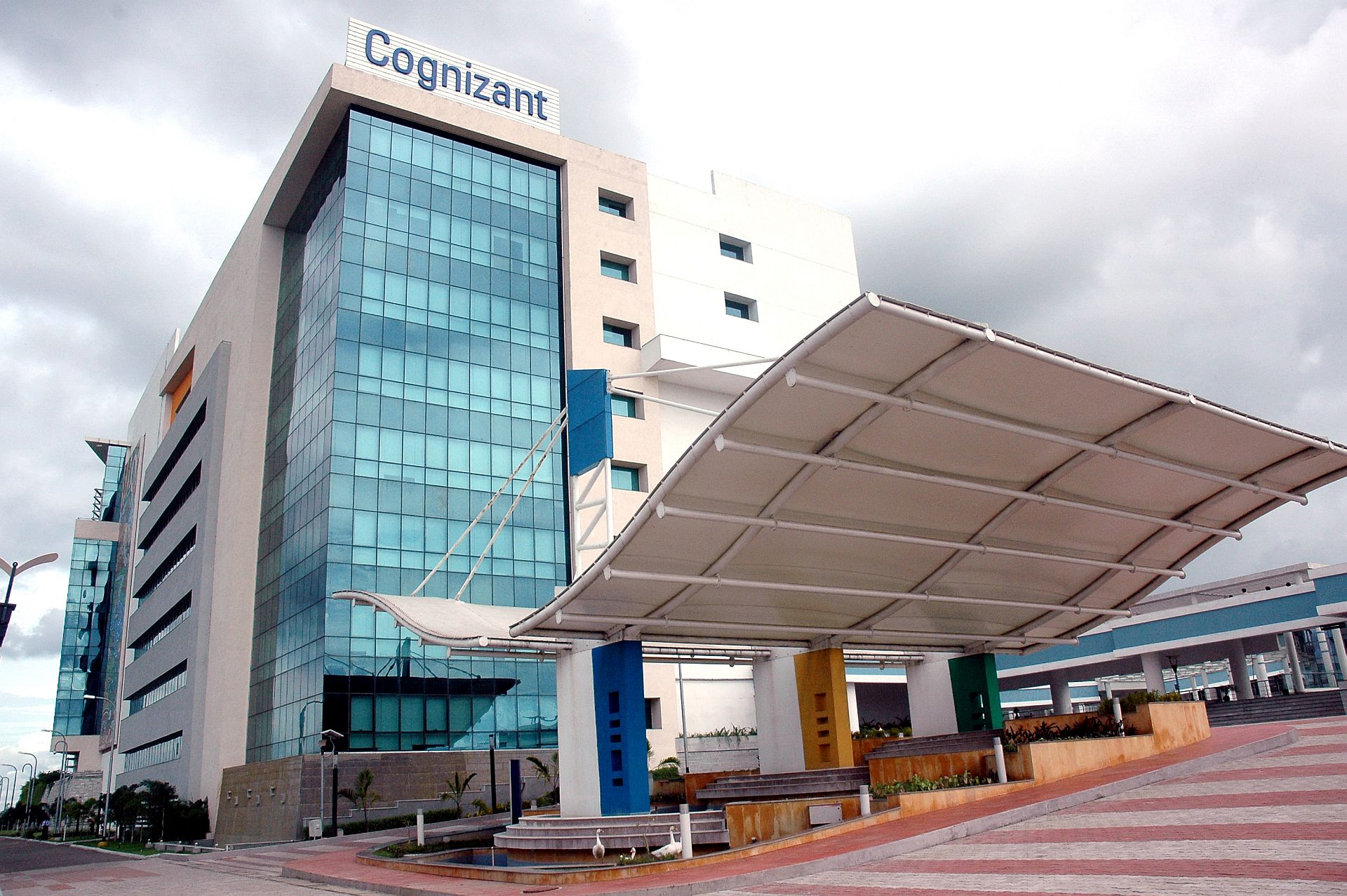
Cognizant Bantala Campus

Cluster/ business district	Complex name	Company	Area	Office space	Location	Details	Established/ operation started	Occupants	Ref(s)
Salt Lake (PBD)	Godrej Waterside	Godrej	6 acres	18 lakh sq. ft.	Sector V	IT park	2016	Mjunction, Ernst & Young, KPMG, Justdial, Abzooba, Cisco	
Salt Lake (PBD)	Godrej Genesis	Godrej	4.29 acres	15 lakh sq. ft.	Sector V	IT park	2014	PwC	
Salt Lake (PBD)	Wipro SEZ	Wipro	20 acres	10 lakh sq. ft.	Sector V	IT park	2004		
Salt Lake (PBD)	Bengal Eco Intelligent Park	Techna Infrastructure	3.5 acres	7 lakh sq. ft.	Sector V	IT park	2017	TCG Digital, Labvantage	
Salt Lake (PBD)	Infinity Think Tank	Infinity Group	2 acres	2.8 lakhs sq. ft.	Sector V	IT park			
Salt Lake (PBD)	Infinity Adventz	Infinity Group	2.5 acres	8.5 lakhs sq. ft.	Sector V	IT park			
Salt Lake (PBD)	Millennium City IT Park	Rungta Group	2.5 acres	3 lakh sq. ft.	Sector V	IT park	2005		
Salt Lake (PBD)	Imagine Tech Park	Simplex Infrastructures Limited	1.5 acres	7 lakh sq. ft.	Sector V	IT park	2023	Genpact	
Salt Lake (PBD)	Infinity Benchmark	Infinity Group	2.5 acres	5 lakhs sq. ft.	Sector V	IT park	2009		
Salt Lake (PBD)	Infinity IT Lagoon	Infinity Group	2.5 acres	4.9 lakhs sq. ft.	Sector V	IT park	2014		
Salt Lake (PBD)	Merlin Infinite	Merlin Group; Infinity Group	2 acres	5.8 lakhs sq. ft.	Sector V	IT park	2014		
Salt Lake (PBD)	TCS Delta Park	TCS	3.5 acres		Sector V	IT park: 3 buildings: Delta, Lords and Eden building			
Salt Lake (PBD)	Martin Burn Tech Park	Infinity Group	1 acre	4 lakh sq. ft.	Sector V	IT park	2013		
Salt Lake (PBD)	Globsyn Crystals	Globsyn Technologies; Bengal Shrachi; Surekha Group	2 acres	6 lakh sq. ft.	Sector V	IT park			
Salt Lake (PBD)	Saltee Tech Park	Saltee Group	2 acres	1.05 lakh sq. ft.	Sector V	IT park	2005		
Salt Lake (PBD)	Srijan Tech Park	Srijan Group; PS Group	2 acres	5 lakh sq. ft.	Sector V	IT park	2009		
Salt Lake (PBD)	Cognizant Techno Complex	Cognizant	3 acres	1.2 lakhs sq. ft.	Sector V	IT park	2004		
Salt Lake (PBD)	Webel Tower I	WEBEL			Sector V	IT park			
Salt Lake (PBD)	Webel Tower II	WEBEL			Sector V	IT park			
Salt Lake (PBD)	STPI Kolkata	STPI	2 acres	65000 sq. ft.	Sector V	IT park	1995		
Salt Lake (PBD)	Magatherm	Megatherm Electronics		1.5 lakh sq. ft.	Sector V	IT park	2015		
Salt Lake (PBD)	Technopolis	Forum Group	1.5 acres	7 lakh sq. ft.	Sector V	India's first green IT park	2006		
Salt Lake (PBD)	SDF IT Park	WEBEL	1.5 acres	2.5 lakhs sq. ft.	Sector V	Oldest IT building in Salt Lake Sector V	1988		
Salt Lake (PBD)	Webel Manibhandar IT Park	WEBEL	1 acre	38,056 sq. ft.	Sector V	IT park			
Salt Lake (PBD)	Webel STP II IT Park	WEBEL	0.2 acres	54,166 sq. ft.	Sector V	IT park			
Salt Lake (PBD)	Webel Bhaban IT Park	WEBEL	0.5 acre	6,788 sq. ft.	Sector V	IT park			
Salt Lake (PBD)	Salt Lake Incubation Center IT Park	WEBEL	0.5 acre	3,456 sq. ft.	Sector V	IT park			
Salt Lake (PBD)	Merlin the Summit	Merlin Group	2.2 acre	5.25 lakh sq. ft.	Sector V	IT park	Under construction		
New Town (PBD)	Candor Tech Space (Unitech Infospace Hi-Tech park)	Unitech Group	48 acre	30 lakh sq. ft.	New Town Action Area I	SEZ, IT park	2005		
New Town (PBD)	TCS Gitanjali Park	TCS	40 acre	22 lakh sq. ft.	New Town Action Area II	SEZ, IT park	2016		
New Town (PBD)	TCS Sanchayita Park	TCS	10 acre	20 lakh sq. ft.	New Town Action Area II	SEZ, IT park	Under construction		
New Town (PBD)	Infosys	Infosys	50 acre	5.25 lakh sq. ft. (1st phase)	New Town Action Area IIIG	IT park and software development centre	2024		
New Town (PBD)	RDB Primarc TechPark	Primarc Group RDB Group	9.5 acre	14.69 lakh sq. ft.	New Town Action Area IA	IT park	2005	IBM, Concentrix, Lexmark	
New Town (PBD)	Srijan IT Park	Srijan Group	25 acre	10.54 lakh sq. ft.	New Town Action Area II	SEZ, IT park	2015	Ericsson, BT, Tech Mahindra, LTIMindtree	
New Town (PBD)	Mani Casadona	Mani Group	13 acre	14.79 lakh sq. ft.	New Town CBD	Business park	2016	Infosys, ITC Infotech, Capital Numbers	
New Town (PBD)	Webel Rajarhat IT Park I	WEBEL	0.5 acre	20,700 sq. ft.	New Town Action Area ID	IT park			
New Town (PBD)	Webel Rajarhat IT Park II	WEBEL	1 acre	22,000 sq. ft.	New Town Action Area ID	IT park			
New Town (PBD)	Rishi Tech Park	Rishi group	0.64 acre	8284 sq. ft.	New Town Action Area ID	IT park	2011		
New Town (PBD)	ITC Sanskriti Infotech Park	ITC Limited	17 acre	30 lakh sq. ft.	New Town Action Area IIIG	IT park	Under construction		
New Town (PBD)	Wipro IT SEZ Rajarhat	Wipro	50 acre	TBD	New Town	SEZ, IT park	Under construction		
New Town (PBD)	TCS Campus	TCS	20 acre	TBD	New Town Action Area II		Under construction		
New Town (PBD)	LTIMindtree Innovation Campus	LTIMindtree	19 acre		New Town Action Area II		Under construction		
New Town (PBD)	Webel IT Park	WEBEL	5 acre	TBD	New Town Action Area II		Under construction		
New Town (PBD)	Firstsource Solutions IT Park	Firstsource Solutions	4 acre	TBD	New Town Action Area II		Under construction		
Others	Cognizant Tech Park	Cognizant	21 acres	5.5 lakhs sq. ft.	Bantala	SEZ			
Others	Webel IT Park Taratala	WEBEL	1.5 acre	29,000 sq. ft.	Taratala	One tower with five storeys			
Others	Webel IT Park Howrah	WEBEL	1 acre	30,000 sq. ft.	Ankurhati, Howrah	One tower with four storeys			
Others	Webel IT Park Kalyani I	WEBEL	1 acre	21,500 sq. ft.	Kalyani	One tower with four storeys			
Others	Webel IT Park Kalyani II	WEBEL	1 acre	28,000 sq. ft.	Kalyani	One tower with four storeys			

== Business parks ==
Cluster/ business district	Complex name	Company	Area	Office space	Location	Details	Established/ operation started	Ref(s)
CBD	Keventer One		2.7 acre	10 lakh sq. ft.	Strand Road	Business park	Under construction	
SBD	Biowonder	Somani Realty	2.5 acre	4 lakh sq. ft.	EM Bypass	Business park	Operational since 2017	
SBD	Srijan Westcom	Srijan Realty	3.05 acre	3.3 lakh sq. ft.	Taratala	Business park	Under construction	
SBD	Rudramani	Somani Realty; Mani Group			EM Bypass	Business park	Operational	
SBD	Primac Chambers	Primarc Group	0.9 acre	1.76 lakh sq. ft.	EM Bypass	Business park	Operational	
SBD	Ultimate 17	Ultimate 17 Smartvista LLP	0.78 acre	1.14 lakh sq. ft.	EM Bypass	Business park	Under construction	
SBD	South City Business Park	Shrachi Realty	2.5 acre	2.5 lakh sq. ft.	EM Bypass	Business park	Operational	
SBD	Active Business Park	Ruchi Realty			Tangra	Business park	Operational since 2012	
SBD	Intellia Business Park	Srijan Realty	5.5 acre	7 lakh sq. ft.	Park Circus	Business park	Under construction	
PBD (Salt Lake)	Ecostation Business Tower	Ambuja Neotia Group	1 acre		Sector V	Business park	2013	
PBD (New Town)	Synthesis Business Park	Shrachi Group	15 acre	6.5 lakh sq. ft.	New Town CBD	Business park	2010	
PBD (New Town)	Ecospace Business Park	Ambuja Neotia Group	20 acre	20 lakh sq. ft.	New Town CBD	Business park	2013	
PBD (New Town)	Ecosuite Business Tower	Ambuja Neotia Group	1 acre		New Town CBD	Business park	2015	
PBD (New Town)	Ecospace Business Towers	Ambuja Neotia Group	5 acre		New Town CBD	Business park	2013	
