= Bengal Silicon Valley Tech Hub =

Technology hub in Kolkata, India

- Interactive map of Bengal Silicon Valley Tech Hub
- Location: New Town Action Area II, Kolkata (Greater), India
- Owner: Government of West Bengal
- Operator: HIDCO
- Type: Technology Park
- Events: IT/ITeS; Data centre E-commerce; IoT; KPO; AI; R&D; Telecom
- Acreage: 250 acres
- Public transit: Orange Line

Construction
- Opened: 13 August 2018

Website
- bengalsiliconvalley.in

Bengal Silicon Valley Tech Hub is a technology hub in the Indian state of West Bengal, consisting of various tech parks, buildings, projects and premises which work on the sectors like IT/ITeS, Data Centre, E-commerce, IoT, KPO, AI, R&D and Telecom. The hub is projected to be completed in 2025, generating 1,00,000 direct jobs. As of 2022, the total investment in the hub is ₹1 trillion.

== Formation ==
Bengali Silicon Valley Hub was formed in 2018 to boost technology service industry in the state and was inaugurated on 13 August 2018 by the then Chief Minister of West Bengal, Mamata Banerjee. Initially 100 acres of land was embarked for the hub. Afterwards another 100 acres of land was added after the announcement of finance minister Amit Mitra. 107 acres were allotted in Phase I and II with TCS having 20 acres, Reliance Jio having 40 acres, Cognizant having 25 acres, ISI having four acres, Tech Mahindra having four acres and Capgemini having four acres. The Phase III allotted 56.7 acres of land. Additional 50 acres of land was added to the hub in May 2022.

A technology campus, Ananda Niketan, of LTIMindtree (LTM Limited) of the Larsen & Toubro Group was inaugurated on 27 August 2026 by the state's chief minister, Suvendu Adhikari, at the tech hub in the presence of the chairman of L&T, S. N. Subrahmanyan. The campus of two buildings is spread across 18 acres (800,000 sq ft) and can accommodate up to 5,800 engineers and professionals. Meanwhile, an additional 10 acres (440,000 sq ft) was also allocated to the firm. L&T also received approval to construct four more towers at the site while L&T Realty would take up the project soon. The campus would serve as an integrated centre for learning and innovation to supporting clients across banking and financial services, travel, manufacturing, energy and technology while it would focus on artificial intelligence, data, cloud and digital engineering.

== Sectors ==
Land area usage (As of 2022)
1. Data Centre (118.11 acres) (47.2%)
2. CoE (5.36 acres) (2.00%)
3. Digital consulting (0.05 acres) (0.20%)
4. E-commerce (6.00 acres) (2.40%)
5. IoT (1.12 acres) (0.48%)
6. AI (1.25 acres) (0.50%)
7. IT/ITeS (77.89 acres) (28.4%)
8. KPO (5.38 acres) (2.15%)
9. R&D (8.16 acres) (3.26%)
10. Telecom (0.50 acres) (0.20%)
11. Other (13.2%)
As of 2022, the total area allotted stands at 224 acres with 50 companies taking 59 plots

=== Data Centres ===
BSVH has numerous data centre projects built and under construction. In 2018, Reliance Jio took 40 acres of land to set up Rs 1,000-crore data centre facility. It will have two international data centres in collaboration with Microsoft and a technology centre. The facility is planned to have a 525,000 square feet of built-up area. The company invested Rs 100 crore in the first phase. In 2020, the construction was started.

Adani Enterprises is also constructing a hyper-scale data centre on 51.75 acres of land, which is the single largest land in the hub for a data centre.

NTT Global data centres, which is a pioneer company in the field of data centre is also constructing a data hub on 7.5 acres of land in BSVH. The project was launched in 2022 with a projected investment of ₹2000 Crores. The facility will consist 6 lakh sq. ft. of area, 40 MW capacity and will be built in three phases (buildings) completing 1, 2.5 and 2.5 lakhs sq. ft. of space respectively.

Other companies are setting up data centres like STT global data centres in 5.6 acres, CtrlS global data centes in 5.6 acres, Techno Electric & Eng in 4 acres and Airtel Nxtra in 2.85 acres.

=== IT Space ===
Major IT companies have started their constructions in the hub, likely TCS in 20 acres, LTIMindtree in 18.92 acres, Webel in five acres, Firstsource Solutions in four acres. There are more than 40 medium and small IT companies.

On 9 January 2023, Tata Consultancy Services (TCS) signed a lease agreement with WBHIDCO to lease a land parcel of 20 acres at a cost of ₹94 crore (US$9.8 million) for 99 years.

=== Others ===
Other sectors include E-commerce, IoT, KPO, AI, R&D and Telecom. Indian Statistical Institute has a Centre of Excellence on a four-acre plot. Society for Applied Microwave Electronics Engineering & Research, an R&D institution under Ministry of Electronics and Information has a 3.05 acre R&D unit in the hub.

== Connectivity and transport ==
Bengal Silicon Valley Tech Hub is located on the Biswa Bangla Sarani. Kolkata Metro's Orange Line serves as the rapid transit of the area.

== See also ==
- List of tech parks in Kolkata
- FinTech Hub, Kolkata
