= Salt Lake Sector-V =

Salt Lake Sector V, Kolkata
- CBD
- Nabadiganta Industrial Township
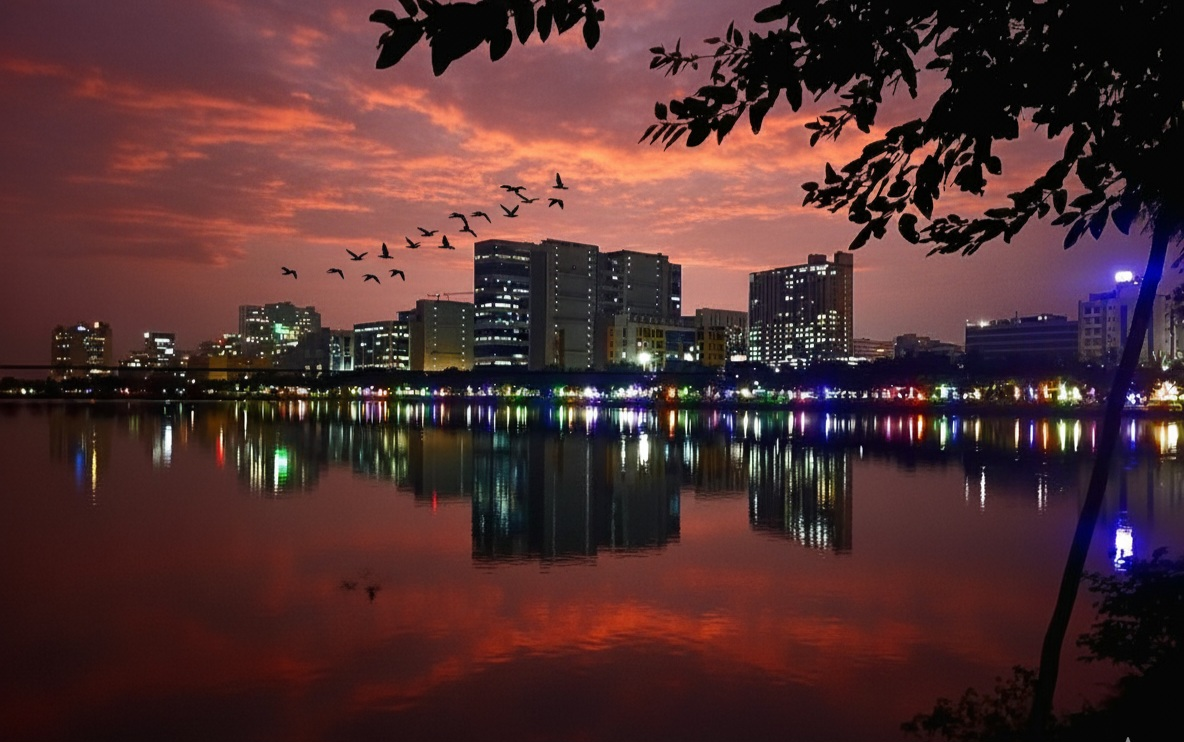
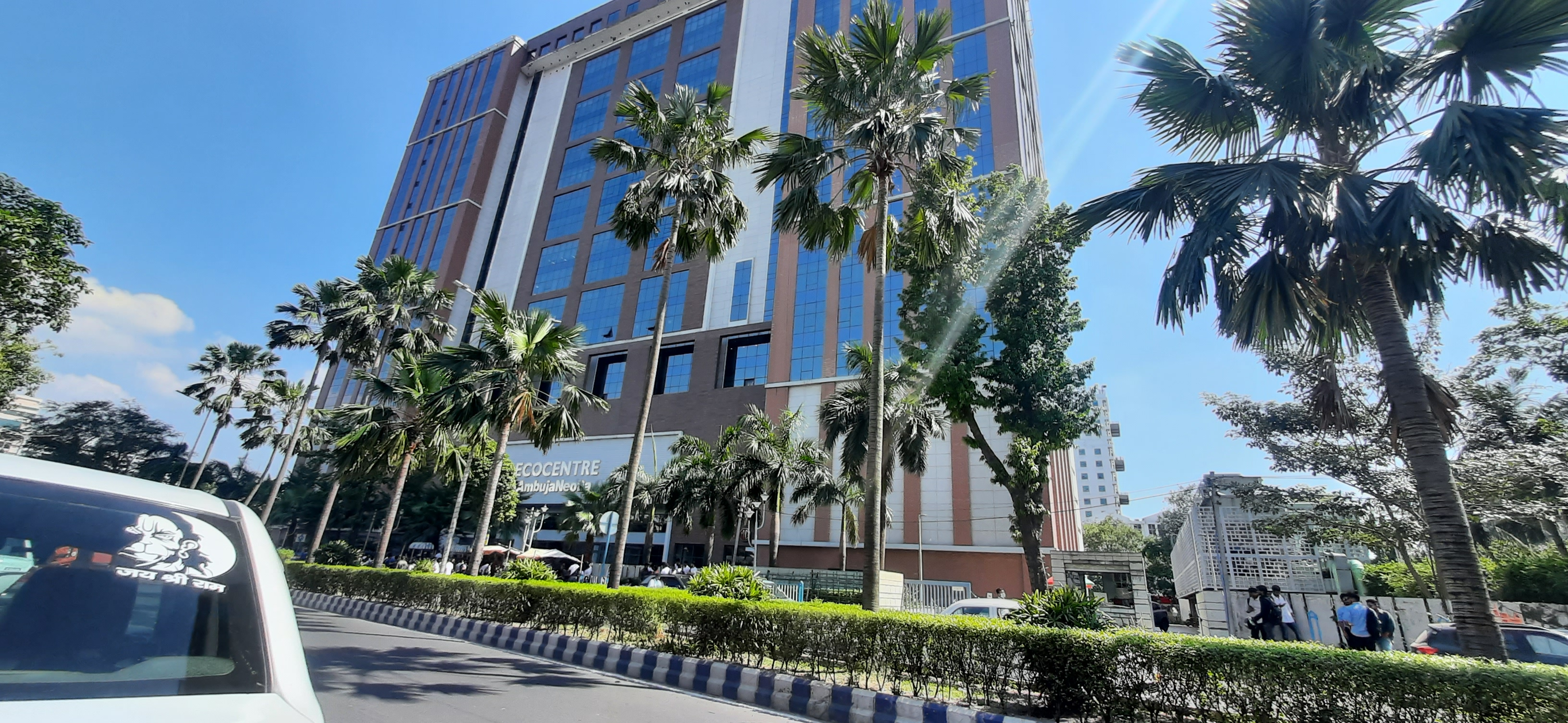
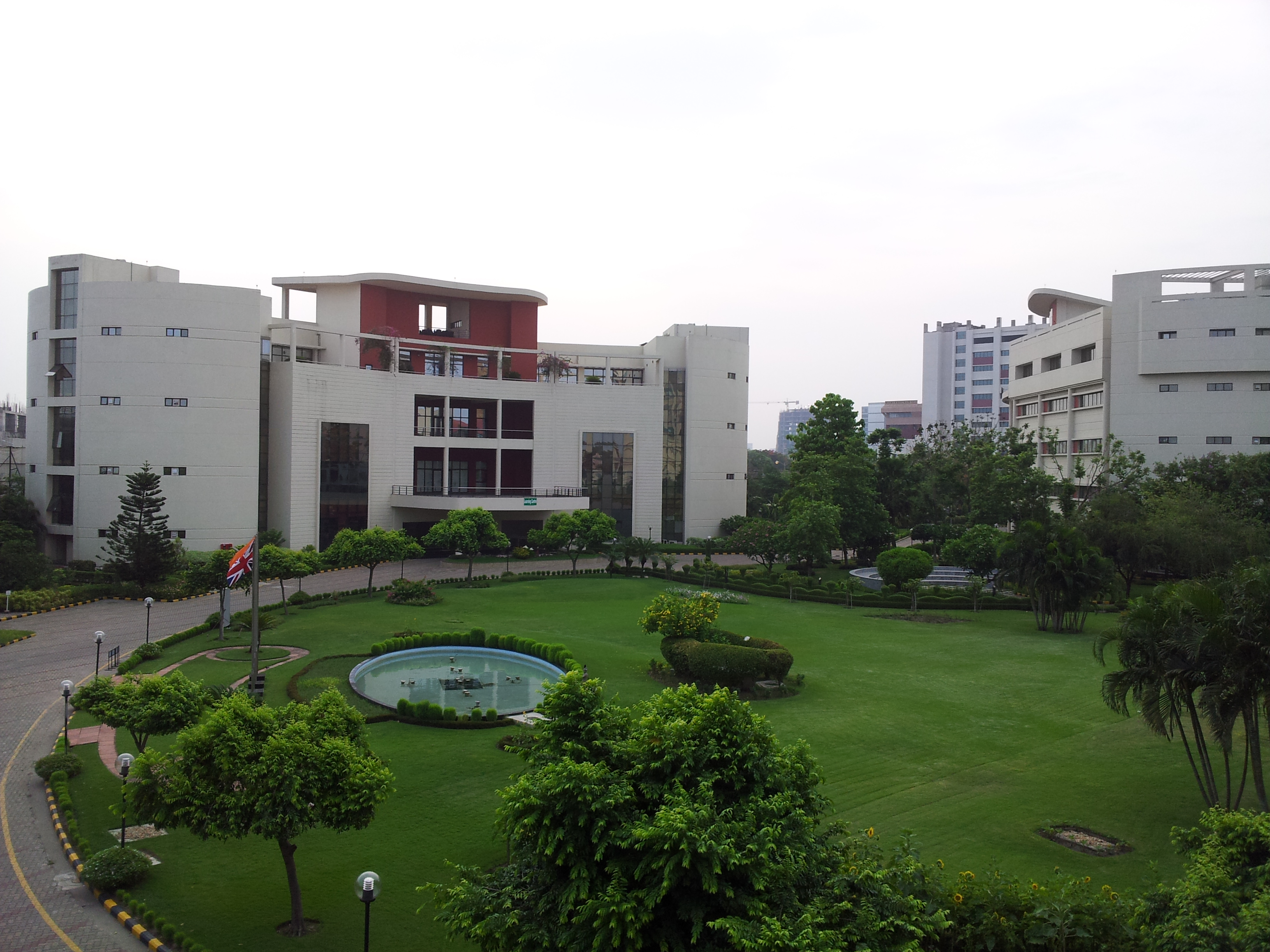
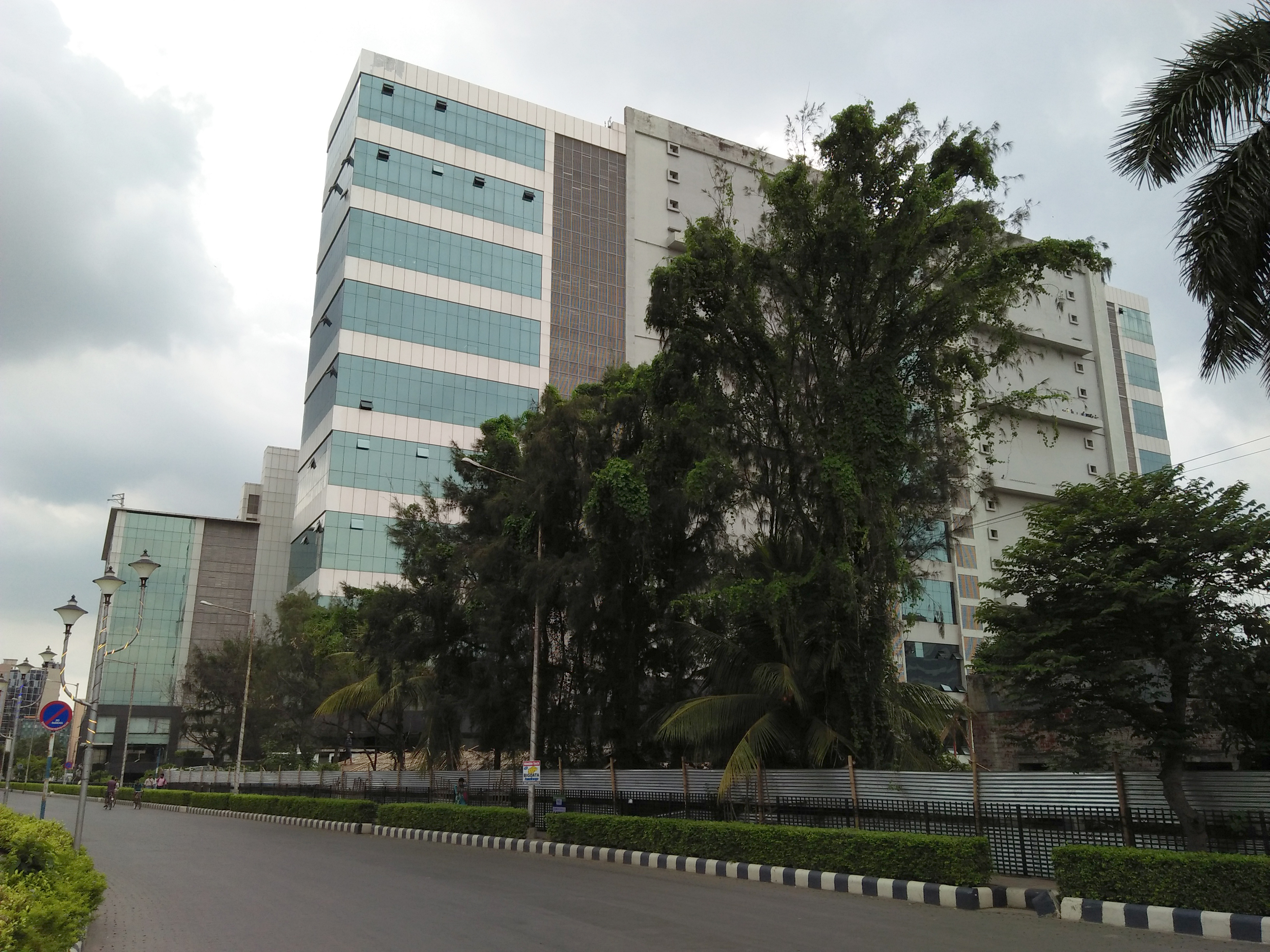
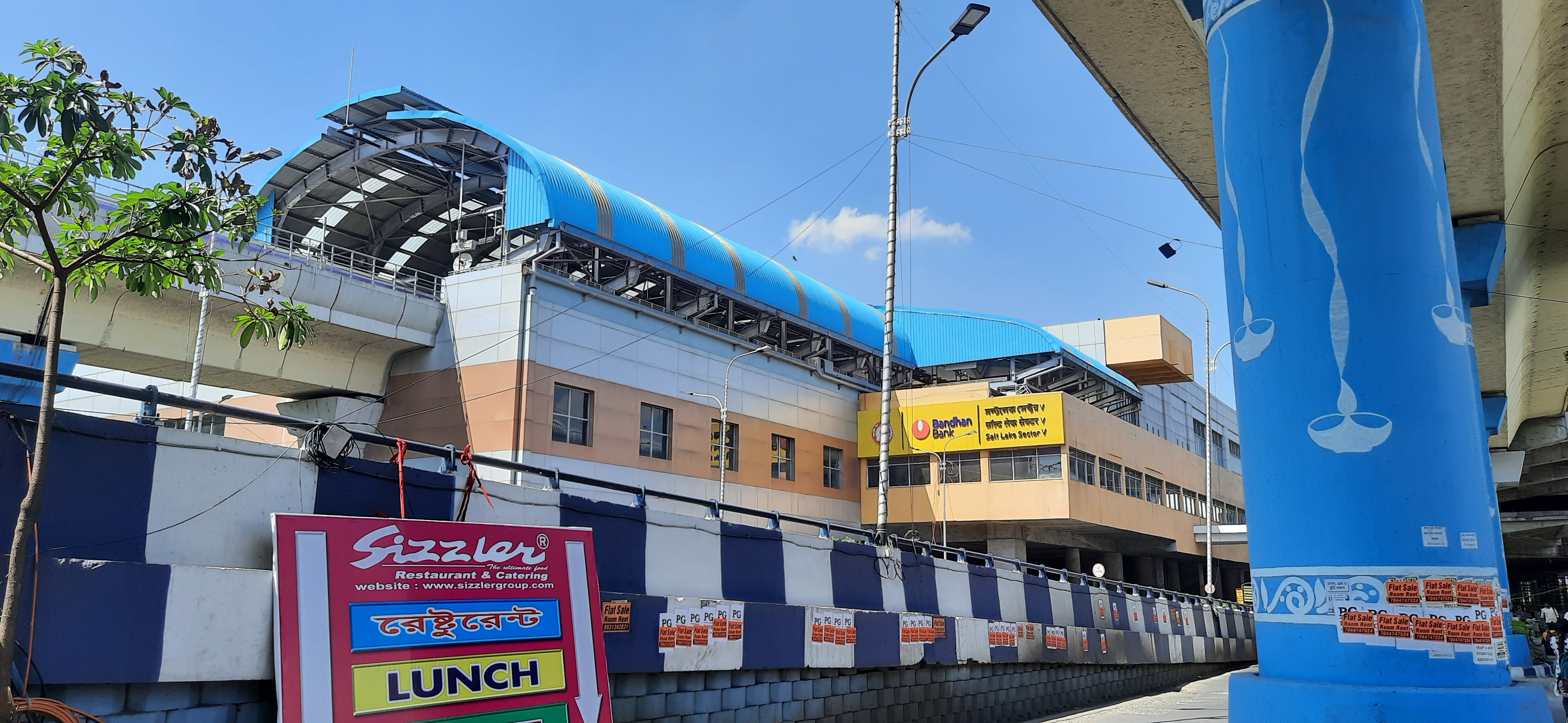
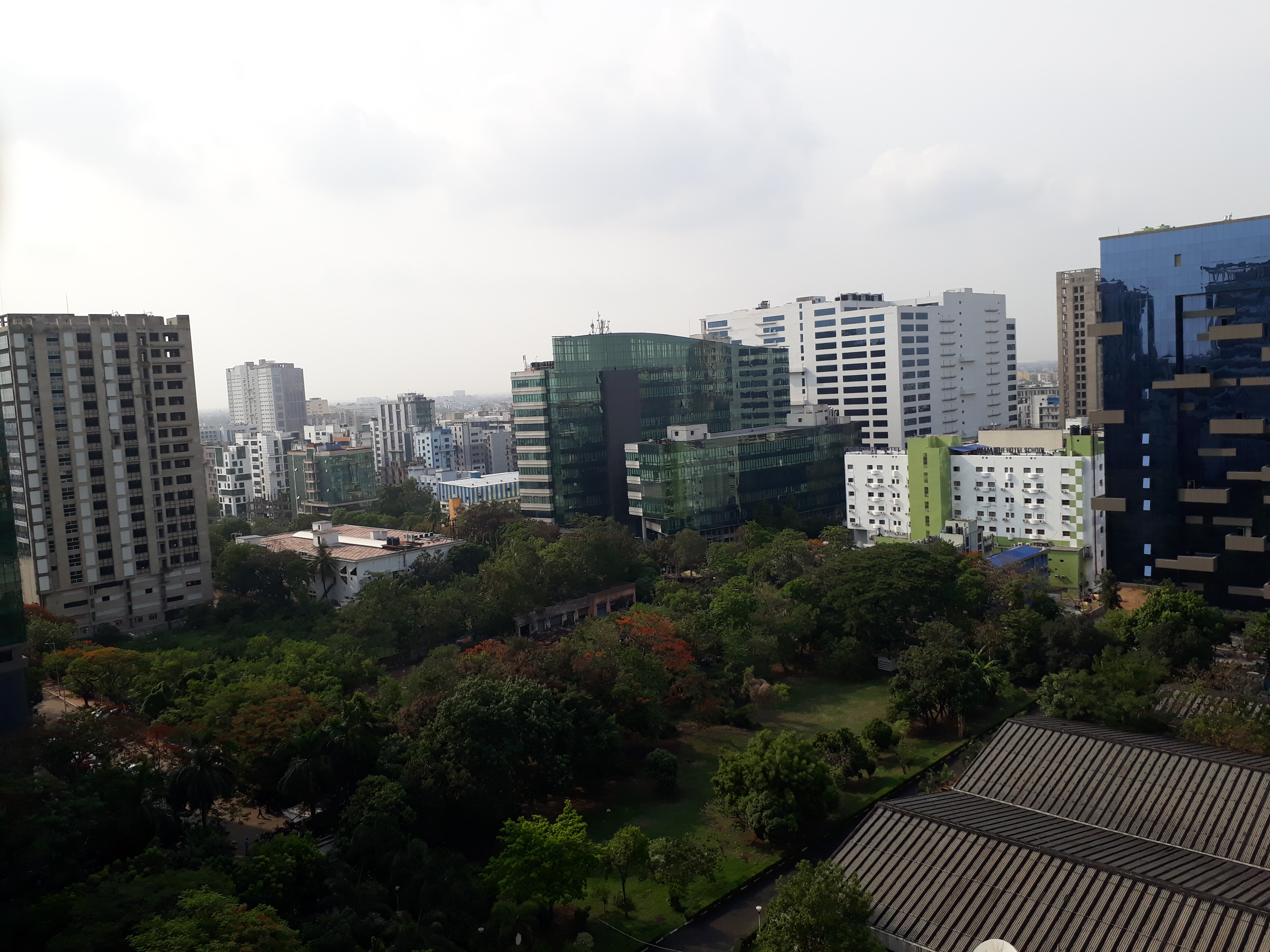
- Salt Lake Sectov V skyline during sunset Ambuja Neotia Ecocentre Wipro SEZ Godrej Waterside, largest IT park in the area Salt Lake Sector V metro station Commercial high rises in Sector V
- Interactive map of Salt Lake Sector V, Kolkata
- Coordinates: 22°34′37″N 88°26′02″E
- Country: India
- State: West Bengal
- District: North 24 Parganas
- City: Kolkata
- Region: Kolkata metropolitan area

Area
  - Total: 170 ha (430 acres)

Languages
  - Official: Bengali; English
- Time zone: UTC+5:30 (IST)
- Area code: 033
- Rapid transit: Salt Lake Sector-V, IT Centre
- Local body: Bidhannagar Municipal Corporation
- Civic agency: Nabadiganta Industrial Township Authority (NDITA)
- Vidhan Sabha constituency: Bidhannagar
- Police: Bidhannagar City Police
- Website: https://ndita.org/

Salt Lake Sector-V is the commercial sector of Salt Lake City and a business district under Kolkata metropolitan area in the Indian state of West Bengal. Spread over an area of 430 Acres, Salt Lake Sector V is known as the IT Hub of Kolkata as well as of East India.

== History and NDITA Formation ==
Sector V was planned as a commercial sector of Bidhannagar city. Prior to 1995, Sector V was maintained by Bidhannagar Municipality. But since Sector-V was seeing electronics and IT industry growing fast in the area (due to Salt Lake Electronics Complex), the Government of West Bengal considered to construct an Industrial Township under Section 385A of the West Bengal Municipal Act, 1993. Followed by an announcement on 31 January 2006, a new Township Authority called "Nabadiganta Industrial Township Authority" was made.

== Salt Lake Electronics Complex ==
Salt Lake electronics complex (abbr. SALTLEC) was formed by Webel in 1989 to promote electronic industry. 87.55 Acres of land in Sector V was earmarked for the complex. The complex was originally designed as an Electronics Industry Complex, which would house large, medium and small electronics firms. But afterwards due to close proximity to Kolkata Airport, the then Government of West Bengal decided to promote the complex as an IT-BPO hub. It became the first software technology park in Kolkata metropolitan. In 1999, Salt Lake Electronic Complex housed 160 companies spread over an area of 135 acres. In 2006, SALTLEC housed more than 170 IT/ITeS, biotech and pharma companies. As of 2019, the complex is spread on a land of 150 Acres which have 63 electronic units and more than 200 IT/ITeS firms along with many MSME companies.

== PBD of Kolkata ==
Sector V is the peripheral business district of Kolkata and one of the major commercial sectors of entire Kolkata metropolitan area. As of 2023, there is 12.3 million sq. feet of grade A office space with 2.3 million sq. feet of grade A office space under development. Altogether Sector V have 14.6 million sq. feet of grade A office space which is highest in Kolkata Metropolitan Area. Most of the commercial spaces are eloped by IT/BPO companies.

== IT and business parks ==
Some significant IT parks are as follows:

1. Infinity Benchmark
2. Technopolis
3. DLF IT Park
4. Godrej Waterside
5. RDB Boulevard
6. Unitech Infospace
7. Ecospace Business Park
8. PS Srijan Corporate Park
9. GP Block
10. Ideal Aspire

== Transport ==
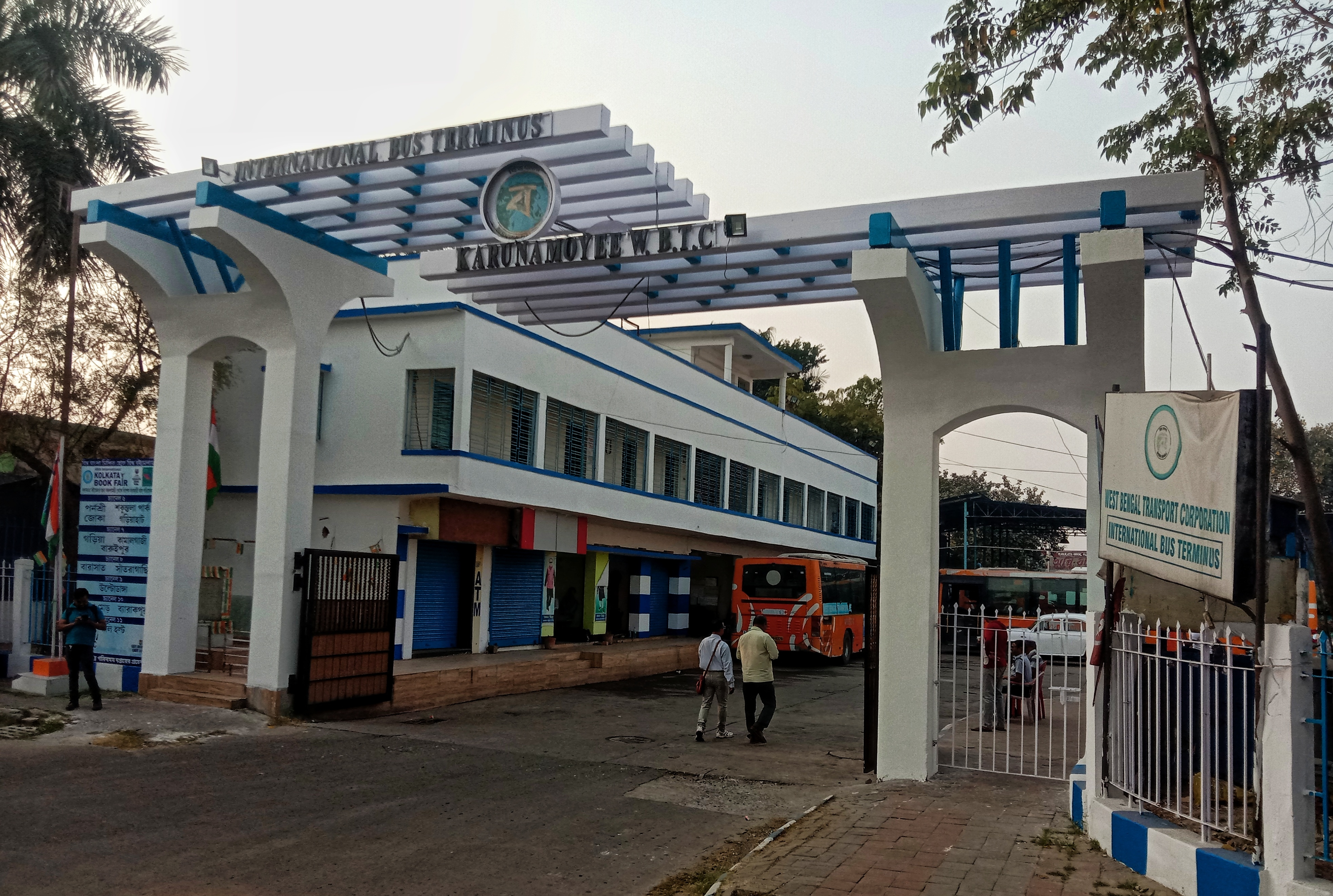
Entrance gate of Karunamoyee Bus Terminal at Sector V

The modes of transportation like other parts of Kolkata includes air conditioned/non-ac government/private buses, taxi and other popular options like auto rickshaw and e-rickshaws. The Howrah Maidan - Salt Lake Sector V - Teghoria (Haldiram) Line (Green Line) of the Kolkata Metro is in operation since 14 February 2020 between Salt Lake Sector V and Salt Lake Stadium. The New Garia – Dum Dum Airport Line (Orange Line) of the Kolkata Metro, which passes through the Salt Lake Bypass, is under-construction.

== See also ==
- List of tech parks in Kolkata
- New Town, Kolkata
