= Salt Lake Electronics Complex =

Technology Complex in Kolkata

Coordinates: 22.573°N 88.433°E

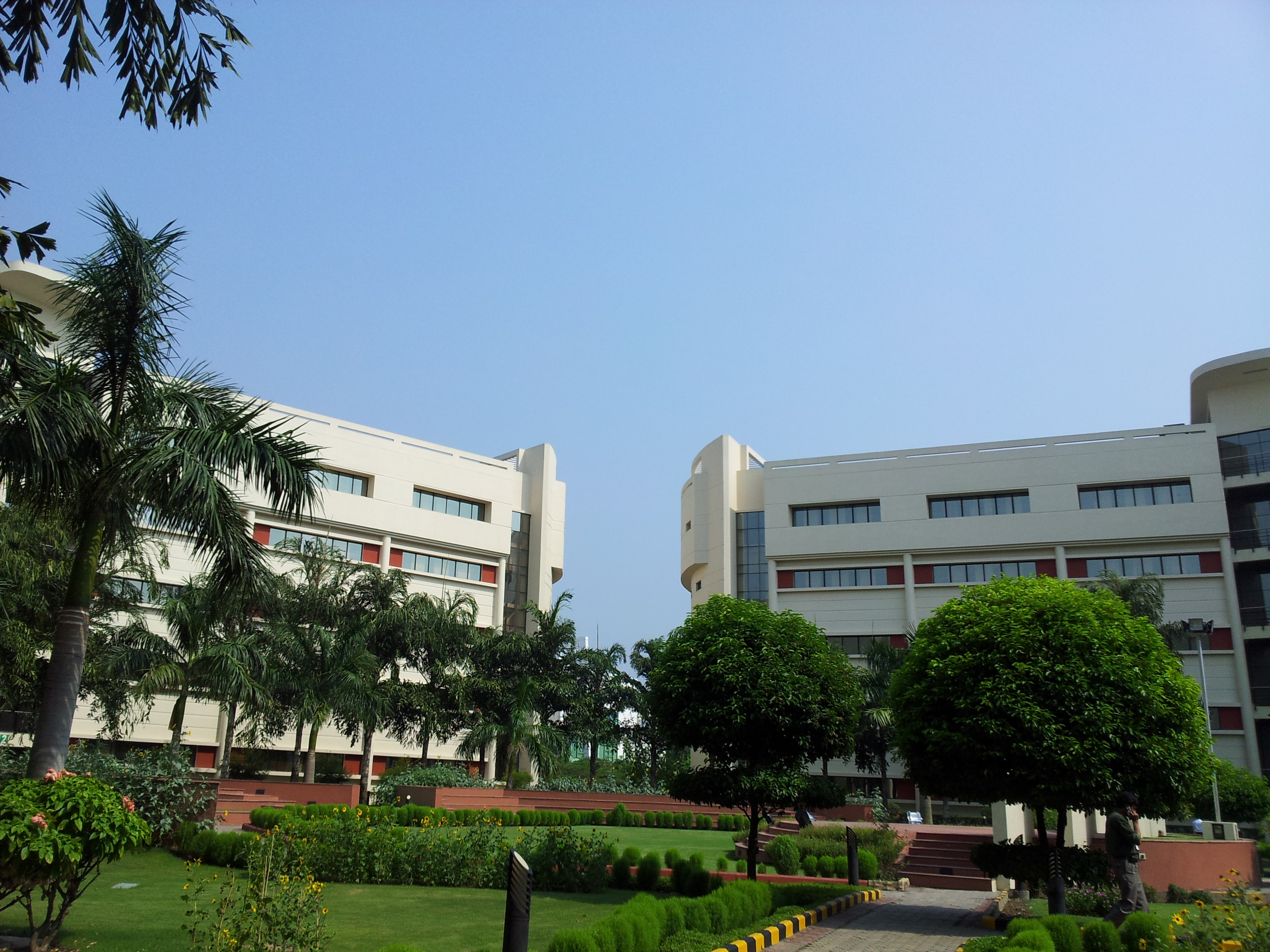
- Wipro SEZ in SALTLEC
- Type: Technology hub
- Established: 1989
- Founded by: Webel
- Location: Salt Lake Sector V, Kolkata, West Bengal, India
- Region: Kolkata metropolitan area
- Area: 150 acres (61 ha)
- Nearest rapid transit: Kolkata Metro: Salt Lake Sector-V
- Industry: Electronics, Information Technology
- Notable IT parks: Wipro SEZ; Infinity Think Tank; SDF IT Building; Globsyn Crystals

Salt Lake Electronics Complex (or, Salt Lake Electronic City) (abbr. SALTLEC) is a technology hub in the Sector V of Bidhannagar, Kolkata in the Indian state of West Bengal. Spread over an area of 150 Acres, it consists various electronics and IT parks. It is India's first fully integrated Electronics Complex, specialized for electronics, IT and BPO industry. The complex has 20 acres of SEZ land, allotted to Wipro.

== Formation ==
Salt Lake electronics complex was formed by Webel in 1989 to promote electronic industry. 87.55 Acres of land in Sector V was earmarked for the complex. The complex was originally designed as an Electronics Industry Complex, which would house large, medium and small electronics firms. But afterwards due to close proximity to Kolkata Airport, the then Government of West Bengal decided to promote the complex as an IT-BPO hub. It became India's first fully integrated Electronics Complex, and afterwards first software technology complex in Kolkata metropolitan.

== IT Parks and companies ==
In 1999, Salt Lake Electronic Complex housed 160 companies spread over an area of 135 acres. In 2006, SALTLEC housed more than 170 IT/ITeS, biotech and pharma companies. As of 2019, the complex is spread on a land of 150 Acres which have 63 electronic units and more than 200 IT/ITeS firms along with many MSME companies.

Some of biggest tech parks in the hub are Wipro IT Park on a 20 Acre SEZ land, Infinity Think Tank, Globsyn Crystals, SDF Building etc.

== See also ==
- List of tech parks in Kolkata
- New Town, Kolkata
- Salt Lake Sector-V
