= Department of Personnel & Administrative Reforms (West Bengal) =

Indian state government ministry

Department overview
- Jurisdiction: Government of West Bengal
- Headquarters: Writers' Building, Kolkata
- Minister responsible: Suvendu Adhikari, Minister for Personnel & Administrative Reforms
- Parent department: Government of West Bengal
- Key document: par.wb.gov.in/wbsm.php
- Website: par.wb.gov.in

Department of Personnel & Administrative Reforms of West Bengal commonly known as P&AR is a Bengal government ministry. It is a ministry basically responsible for controlling the Department for IAS, WBCS (Exe), WBSS and other common cadres of the Secretariat. It also acts as the nodal Department for monitoring activities in Administrative Reforms, Redressal of Public Grievances, Implementation of the Right to Information Act, 2005 & the West Bengal Lokayukta Act, 2003.

== Ministerial Team ==
The ministerial team is headed by the Cabinet Minister for Personnel & Administrative Reforms, who may or may not be supported by Ministers of State. Civil servants are assigned to them to manage the ministers' office and ministry.

The current head of the department is Suvendu Adhikari, the Chief Minister of West Bengal.

== Departmental Cells ==
- All India Service Pension Cell
- Indian Administrative Service Cell
- West Bengal Civil Service Cell
- West Bengal Secretariat Service Cell
- Common Cadre Wing Cell
- Establishment Cell
- Training Cell
- General Cell
- Vigilance Cell
- Administrative Reforms Cell
- IT Cell
- Pension and Group Insurance Cell
- Service Records & Accounts Cell
- Medical Cell
- E-Gov Cell

== Attached Offices ==
- Administrative Training Institute
- Resident Commissioner of West Bengal
- West Bengal Information Commission
- Lokayukta
- State Vigilance Commission
- Anti Corruption Branch
- West Bengal Public Service Commission

== Acts and Rules ==
=== Acts ===
- West Bengal Lokayukta (Amendment) Act, 2018
- PREVENTION OF CORRUPTION ACT, 1988
- DEPARTMENTAL PROCEEDINGS (ENFORCEMENT OF ATTENDANCE OF WITNESSES AND PRODUCTION OF DOCUMENTS) ACT, 1973
- DEPARTMENTAL INQUIRIES (ENFORCEMENT OF ATTENDANCE OF WITNESSES AND PRODUCTION OF DOCUMENTS) ACT, 1972

=== Rules ===
- AMENDMENT TO THE WEST BENGAL SERVICES (CLASSIFICATION, CONTROL AND APEAL) RULES, 1971
- WEST BENGAL LOKAYUKTA ACT, 2003
- WEST BENGAL LOKAYUKTA (AMENDMENT) ACT, 2007
- INDIAN ADMINISTRATIVE SERVICE (APPOINTMENT BY SELECTION) REGULATIONS, 1997
- AMENDMENT TO THE WEST BENGAL SERVICES (TRAINING AND EXAMINATION) RULES, 1953
- ALL INDIA SERVICES (STUDY LEAVE) REGULATIONS, 1960
- ALL INDIA SERVICES (DISIPLINE & APPEAL) AMENDMENT RULES, 2015
- WEST BENGAL SERVICES (DUTIES, RIGHTS AND OBLIGATIONS OF THE GOVERNMENT EMPLOYEES) RULES, 1980
- WEST BENGAL SERVICES (DEATH-CUM-RETIREMENT BENEFIT) RULES, 1971
- INDIAN ADMINISTRATIVE SERVICE (APPOINTMENT BY PROMOTION) REGULATIONS, 1955
- INDIAN ADMINISTRATIVE SERVICE (CADRE) RULES, 1954
- ALL INDIA SERVICES (PERFORMANCE APPRAISAL REPORT) RULES, 2007
- ALL INDIA SERVICES (DISCIPLINE AND APPEAL) RULES, 1969
- ALL INDIA SERVICES (DEATH-CUM-RETIREMENT BENEFITS) RULES, 1958
