= Manoj Kumar Agarwal =

Indian civil servant (born 1966)

Chief Secretary of West Bengal
- Incumbent
- Assumed office 11 May 2026
- Governor: R. N. Ravi
- Preceded by: Dushyant Nariala

Chief Electoral Officer of West Bengal
- In office 29 March 2025 – 11 May 2026
- Preceded by: Dr. Ariz Aftab
- Succeeded by: Mrs. Neelam Meena

Personal details
- Born: 8 July 1966 (age 60) Lucknow, Uttar Pradesh, India
- Education: Indian Institute of Technology Kanpur
- Occupation: IAS officer

Manoj Kumar Agarwal (born 8 July 1966) is an Indian civil servant belonging to the 1990 batch of the Indian Administrative Service (IAS), West Bengal cadre. He has served as the Chief Secretary of the Government of West Bengal since May 2026, having previously served as the state's Chief Electoral Officer during the 2026 West Bengal Legislative Assembly election, in which turnout reached 92.4 percent, described by the Election Commission as the highest level of voter participation in the state since independence.

== Early life and education ==
Agarwal was born on 8 July 1966 in Lucknow, Uttar Pradesh. He was educated at La Martiniere College, Lucknow, and holds a Bachelor of Technology degree in mechanical engineering from the Indian Institute of Technology Kanpur. He is married to Rooma Agarwal.

== Career ==
Agarwal began his administrative career in 1990, with early postings as Additional District Magistrate at Bardhaman and Purulia, Sub-divisional Officer at Bardhaman, and Chief Executive Officer at Jalpaiguri, before serving as District Magistrate of North Dinajpur from 1999 to 2001 and District Magistrate of Bardhaman from 2001 to 2003. He then went on central deputation to Delhi, serving as personal secretary to Union minister Priya Ranjan Dasmunsi and as Land Commissioner in the Delhi Development Authority.

On returning to West Bengal, he held several senior secretariat posts in the state government, including Principal Secretary of the Personnel and Administrative Reforms Department, Chairman of the West Bengal Highway Development Corporation, and Principal Secretary and Commissioner of the Food and Supplies Department. He is currently the Chief Secretary of West Bengal and president of the West Bengal State IAS Association.

According to bureaucratic accounts cited by The Print, Agarwal was transferred out of the Food and Supplies Secretary role in 2020 after ordering an FIR over alleged irregularities in the public distribution system. The minister then overseeing the department, Jyotipriya Mallick, was subsequently arrested by the Enforcement Directorate in October 2023 in a money-laundering case linked to the alleged multi-crore ration distribution scam.

=== Chief Electoral Officer and Chief Secretary ===
On 29 March 2025, Agarwal was appointed Chief Electoral Officer of West Bengal by the Election Commission of India, and in that capacity oversaw the 2026 assembly election, which was conducted amid a Special Intensive Revision of the electoral rolls that removed more than nine million names. The election, won by the Bharatiya Janata Party for the first time in the state, recorded turnout of 92.4 percent.

He was appointed Chief Secretary of West Bengal on 11 May 2026, days after Suvendu Adhikari was sworn in as Chief Minister, succeeding Dushyant Nariala, who had held the post on an interim basis appointed by the Election Commission of India for the duration of the election. He was due to retire on 31 July 2026 but was granted a six-month extension, to 31 January 2027, under Rule 16(1) of the All India Services (DCRB) Rules, 1958.

=== Response to electoral-roll allegations ===
In October 2026, Agarwal rejected allegations by Trinamool Congress MP Mahua Moitra concerning his role in West Bengal's Special Intensive Revision of electoral rolls. In an interview with News18, he denied illegally deleting voters' names and said that the Chief Electoral Officer could not independently add or remove names, although the office had an appellate role. He said that changes to the rolls were handled by Electoral Registration Officers and that he had acted within the law.

On 9 October, Agarwal sent Moitra a legal notice seeking removal of two social media posts, an unconditional apology and ₹10 crore in damages for alleged defamation. The notice rejected her allegation that he was responsible for unlawful disenfranchisement and stated that he had performed his duties in accordance with the law and the Election Commission's directions.
