= Financial technology in India =

Financial technology (also called FinTech) is an industry composed of companies that use technology to offer financial services. Early Fintech companies such as KFinTech and CAMS originated in late 1970's and early 1980's. These companies operate in insurance, asset management and payment, and numerous other industries. The Indian market has witnessed massive investments in various sectors adopting FinTech, which has been driven partly by the robust and effective government reforms that are pushing the country towards a digital economy. It has also been aided by the growing internet and smartphone penetration, leading to the adoption of digital technologies and the rise of FinTech in the country

According to a report by Ernst & Young (EY), India is one of the largest and fastest-growing FinTech ecosystems in the world. It stands second after China in terms of the FinTech adoption index with an adoption rate of 87%. The overall estimation of the FinTech market in 2021 for India has come out to be $50 billion as mentioned in a report by FIA Global. In 2024, India ranked third globally in FinTech sector funding.

== Rise of FinTech in India ==
The number of startups in India has grown significantly over the past few years. The number of newly founded startups has increased from 733 in 2016–17 to over 14000 in 2021–22, making India the third largest startup ecosystem in the world after the US and China. Among them, around 6600 startups have been in the FinTech industry, evaluating a market value of US$31 billion in 2021. This rapid growth in the number of startups has been a result of a large talent pool, conducive regulations, and an increased venture capital flow in the past decade. An increased smartphone and internet penetration coupled with a demand for tailored services and superior customer experience by the public, has helped as well.

Financial Technologies has received substantial funding from venture capital and private equity firms. A total of US$8 billion has been invested in FinTechs across around 1000 deals according to a Tracxn database obtained by Deloitte over a period starting 2015 to mid-2020. With another US$8 billion investment in 2021 alone, there has been an exponential rise in the funding. The majority of these deals have been in the digital payment sector and recently in alternative lending and InsurTech as well. Top investments include a PE investment of US$600 million in Pine Labs, and large VC funding rounds by BharatPe (US$395 million), Razorpay (US$375 million), and OfBusiness (US$325 million).

=== Startups and Unicorns ===
According to the Economic Survey published by Invest India, National Investment Promotion and Facilitation Agency, 44 Indian startups achieved the 'Unicorn' status in the year 2021 alone, increasing the total number of Indian unicorns to 83, with a total evaluation of over US$277 billion. Out of 83, 15 unicorns belong to the FinTech industry with a current valuation of around US$60 billion. As of 2024, there are 26 fintech unicorns in India, which have a total market value of $90 billion.

=== Regulation ===
In April 2025, the India Fintech Foundation (IFF) was established. The IFF proposes itself as the self-regulatory organisation (SRO) for India's FinTech industry.

The Reserve Bank of India published Master Direction on Information Technology Governance, Risk, Controls and Assurance Practices on Nov 7, 2023 with an objective to tighten the governance framework for technology within banking segment.

== FinTech Sectors ==
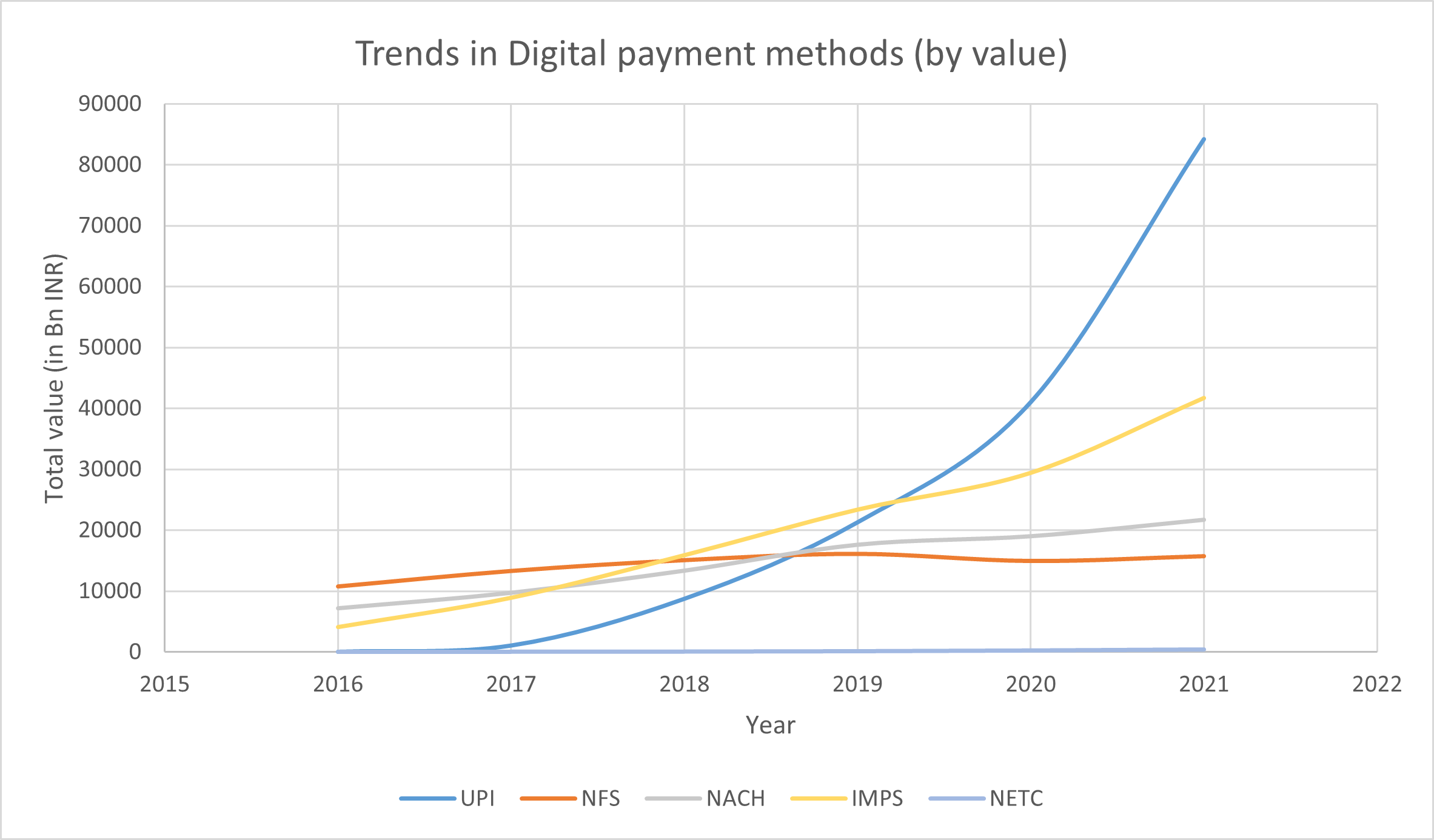
Figure 1: Trends in Digital Payment Methods

=== Digital Payments ===
In recent years, there has been an extensive adoption and significant growth in the digital payments sector with a compound annual growth rate (CAGR) of around 60% from FY2016 to FY2020 and 37% from FY2019 to FY2021.

Figure 2: Trends in Transaction Volume of UPI

The use of digital payments increased significantly in the past few years, with the key reasons being the demonetization initiative announced by Indian Government in 2016 and the outbreak of COVID-19 in 2020. Due to demonetization, the number of cash transactions decreased as the old currency was replaced by new ones to put an end to illegal transactions and tax evasion. This made people resort to using digital payment methods. Similar effects were seen with the onset of the COVID-19 pandemic when people started preferring contactless payment methods to curb the spread of infection. Figure 1 shows that there is an exponential rise in the value of transactions made using UPI. Figure 2 shows the yearly trend in the number of UPI transactions. This increase in the use of UPI can be attributed to the ease with which UPI can be plugged in any consumer tech platform and help it add payment as a useful consumer-centric feature.

In India, digital payment FinTechs have received the highest amount of funding among all the FinTech sectors as per a report by EY. According to a Tracxn database obtained by Deloitte and EY, over 500 FinTech startups were founded in this sector between 2014 and 2019. Digital payments FinTechs obtained an investment of about US$1 billion in just first five months of 2021 as opposed to just US$1.4 billion during the whole of 2020.

=== Alternative Lending ===
The aim of the FinTechs in the alternative lending sector is to deal with the large demand-supply gap of credit in the country. They address the gap by focusing on improving customer experience and gain operating efficiencies, by implementing both conventional and alternative credit scoring models, and digital workflows.

According to Tracxn database obtained by EY, alternative lending as the second biggest receiver of investment in FinTech after Payments sector, at 29% of the total share. India's retail digital lending space has grown significantly in the past decade (2012–22) from US$9 billion to US$270 billion with a CAGR of 39.5%. This huge rise in the lending space can be attributed to various factors.

Low credit card penetration: According to RBI data, the number of credit card holders in India stood at 62 million in 2021, growing at a CAGR of approximately 20% to reach over 114 million cards in circulation by late 2025. Despite this nearly two-fold growth, credit card penetration remains low relative to India's credit-eligible population, estimated at over 300 million adults, indicating a significant untapped market and underlining the continued relevance of alternative lending solutions.

Unbanked population percentage: According to the World Bank's Global Findex Report 2021, approximately 78% of Indian adults (age 15+) have a bank account. This shows that approximately 220 million Indians above the age of 15 don't have a banking account and thus no access to credit or any kind of loan.

High credit gap: India's consumer financing gap stands at $300 billion while the financing gap for the Micro, Small and Medium Enterprises (MSME) stands at $240 billion.

==== Digital Lending ====
Digital lending aims to provide a differentiating factor of either user experience, speed, convenience, or customer service to its end customers. They also bridge the gap between unaddressed lending opportunities like new-to-credit customers and consumers with credits scores under 700. According to data shared by the credit bureau Experian, $350 billion has been given out digitally to consumers, 36% of which are new-to-credit. Fintechs are disbursing the majority share of credit to these first-time consumers.

The Indian financial ecosystem encourages non-bank finance companies (NBFCs) to provide these alternate options to consumers by leveraging innovation and technology.

==== BNPL ====
Buy now pay later (BNPL) is a short-term financing solution that allows customers to make a purchase and pay for it at a future date, usually interest-free. The key value proposition for BNPL is trouble-free credit during checkout. Similar to any lending product, the primary revenue source for BNPL is the income through interests and the fees incurred when customers don't pay back on time. While the BNPL products prefer to avoid the words ‘loan’ or ‘credit’, it is an IOU (acronym for I owe you) in different form.

Until 2019, monthly 22 million Indian consumers were looking for credit and a 70% of them dropped their applications mid-way due to various intricacies in the traditional process. This is where the key features of BNPL products such as transparency with costs and benefits, and frictionless payment made a significant difference and helped mitigate the effects of high consumer credit demand and low credit card penetration.
