= West Bengal Electronics Industry Development Corporation =

West Bengal Electronics Industry Development Corporation Limited পশ্চিমবঙ্গ ইলেকট্রনিক্স শিল্প উন্নয়ন কর্পোরেশন লিমিটেড
- Industry: Information technology Electronics industry
- Founded: 4 February 1974
- Headquarters: Webel Bhavan, Salt Lake, Kolkata (greater), West Bengal, India
- Area served: International
- Key people: Shri Hirak N. Sengupta, Chairman
- Parent: Department of Information Technology and Electronics, Government of West Bengal
- Website: www.webel.in

West Bengal Electronics Industry Development Corporation Limited (abbreviated as and commonly known as Webel) is a public sector company owned by Department of Information Technology and Electronics, Government of West Bengal which works on IT, ITeS, electronics industry, technology development and it's related industries. Based in Indian state of West Bengal and headquartered in Salt Lake city near Kolkata, it was incorporated in 1974 with the objective of developing the electronics industry in West Bengal.

== Operations in electronics industry ==
=== Manufacturing ===
Through its subsidiary companies, WEBEL engages in the manufacture of electronic components and equipments such as Quartz crystals, Electrolytic capacitors, Black-and white picture tubes, Electronically driven tools, Thyristor-controlled AC Drives, Studio and broadcasting equipment, Television sets, Transreceivers, Electronic telephone exchanges, EPBTs etc. It also engages in infrastructure development activities for the electronics industry, including the development of the Taratala Industrial Estate and the Salt Lake Electronics Complex.

=== Electronic parks ===
Name	Location	Site area	Ref(s)
Naihati Electronics Park	Naihati	70 Acres	
Falta Electronics Park	Falta	60 Acres	

=== Hardware parks ===
Name	Location	Site area	Ref(s)
Sonarpur Hardware Park	Sonarpur	11 Acres	
Kalyani Hardware Park	Kalyani	47 Acres	

== Operations in IT industry ==
As of 2019, Webel operates more than 17 IT Parks in India.

== Notable projects implemented ==
Webel has implemented many national and international projects. Webel formed Salt Lake Electronics Complex (abbr. SALTLEC) in 1989 to promote electronic industry, which was first fully integrated electronics park in India. Afterwards, it became the first software technology park in Kolkata metropolitan. As of 2019, the complex is spread on a land of 150 Acres which have 63 electronic units and more than 200 IT/ITeS firms along with many MSME companies.

It has executed turnkey projects, such as the Automatic Message Switching System at the Tribhuvan International Airport in Nepal, and the Toll Collection System at Vidyasagar Setu, Kolkata. It has also implemented e-governance projects including a private optical fiber network, and the West Bengal State Wide Area Network (WBSWAN). WBSWAN forms the basic backbone of the Indian government's e-governance programme.

The organisation also has brought internet bandwidth to make rural India the back office of urban India for tele-education, telemedicine, e-governance, entertainment, and has followed up with projects in health care, law and order, and commercial tax applications.

The organisation has implemented an application, the first of its kind in the country, networking all 411 police stations of West Benga, with applications such as criminal tracking system, an application which permits messaging and access to data at grass-root levels to track crime.

WEBEL has developed a computerised Braille transcription system [BTS] in twelve Indian languages comprising Braille-to-text software, an electronic tactile reader, automatic braille embosser, and audio-supported Braille keybo The system covers transcription in languages such as Bangla, Hindi, Assamese, Oriya, Marathi, Gujarati, Punjabi, Tamil, Telugu, Kannada, Malayalam, Nepali and English.

== Subsidiaries and child organizations ==
Webel has several subsidiaries, child organizations and tie-ups with other organisations for their operations. The major subsidiaries are:

- Webel Technology Limited
- Webel Mediatronics Limited
- Webel Education and Training Division (formerly Webel Informatics Limited)
- Webel Electronic Manufacturing Clusters Limited
- Webel Electronic Infrastructure Development Limited
- Webel Animation Academy

=== Webel Technology Limited ===
Webel Technology Limited (WTL) is the major Information technology arm of Webel as well as the State Nodal Agency for IT. Incorporated in 2001, WTL gives services related to Infrastructure Projects, Software Delivery Services, IT Consultancy Services, Information Security Assurance Services & Procurement of Infrastructure for Department.

=== Webel Mediatronics Limited ===
Its subsidiary Webel Mediatronics Limited engages in the development, manufacturing, and turnkey project execution in the areas of studio and broadcasting systems, industrial electronics, information technology applications, and systems for the disabled. It has in the last 10 years developed and commercialized a host of systems for visually impaired, cerebral palsy-affected, hearing handicapped, and autistic persons. It has a close working relationship with Prasar Bharati, the Indian Ministry of Information and Broadcasting, the Indian Ministry of Communication and Information Technology, and research institutes and universities in the country.

=== Webel Education and Training Division ===
Incorporated in 1992, its subsidiary Webel Education and Training Division (erstwhile Webel Informatics Limited) has a mission is to upgrade the level of computer literacy in West Bengal. As of 2023, WEBEL produces around 12,000 professionals every year. With more than 140 franchise locations all over the state, the company also conducts training and education in 100 government-aided schools and 22 colleges. In association with the Indian government and IBM, the organisation has launched an IT literacy programme in secondary and higher secondary schools.

Webel Informatic's Information Technology Education and Training divisions conduct diploma and certificate courses in software, hardware with networking and multimedia, and a host of information technology courses for beginners, with special emphasis on training college students to help make them industry-ready professionals after graduation.

WIL is the first center of Eastern India which started to provide Global Certification Training in 2002 on Cisco Systems#Certifications and Red Hat India Ltd technologies. It is the regional Cisco Network Academy for Eastern India and awards Cisco Certified Network Associate. It is also the authorized training partner of Red Hat, conducting Red Hat Certified System Administrator and Red Hat Certified Engineer for individuals and corporate clients.

=== Webel Animation Academy ===
WEBEL has set up Webel Animation Academy (aka Toonz Webel Academy), an international animation academy that produces industry-ready animators. West Bengal has been the first and only state (as of 2021) in the India to set up an kind Animation Academy by the Government initiative.

Webel Animation Academy houses a state of the Art facility with 10,000 sq. ft. area containing high-end systems and technical infrastructure and an auditorium at Bidhannagar Sector V.

The academy also hosts internship program and runs academic degree programs like B.Sc. In 3D Animation Film Making, B.Sc. In VFX Film Making, Diploma in 3D & VFX Film Making, Diploma in 3D Animation and other short courses.
