= Government of West Bengal =

Government of West Bengal পশ্চিমবঙ্গ সরকার Paścimbaṅga Sarakāra
- Emblem of West Bengal
- Polity type: Parliamentary Republic; State Government
- Constitution: Constitution of India
- Formation: 1 April 1937; 89 years ago (as Government of Bengal); 15 August 1947; 79 years ago (as Government of West Bengal)

Legislative branch
- Name: West Bengal Legislative Assembly
- Type: Unicameral
- Meeting place: Vidansabha Bhavan, Kolkata

Executive branch
- Head of state
- Title: Governor
- Currently: R. N. Ravi
- Appointer: President of India
- Head of government
- Title: Chief Minister of West Bengal
- Currently: Suvendu Adhikari
- Appointer: Governor
- Cabinet
- Name: State Council of Ministers
- Current cabinet: Suvendu Adhikari Ministry
- Leader: Chief Minister
- Appointer: Governor of West Bengal
- Headquarters: Nabanna(Temporary); Writers' Building, Kolkata (Proposed)
- Ministries: 54 Departments

Judicial branch
- Name: Calcutta High Court
- Courts: Judiciary of India
- Calcutta High Court
- Chief judge: Ravindra Vithalrao Ghuge
- Seat: Calcutta High Court, Kolkata

Government of West Bengal

Overview
- Annual budget: ₹438,775.29 crore (US$45.6 billion) (FY 2026–27)
- Website: wb.gov.in

The Government of West Bengal (Paścimbaṅga Sarakāra, Bengali: পশ্চিমবঙ্গ সরকার) is the Principal administrative authority and State Government of the Indian state of West Bengal, created by the Indian Constitution as the state's legislative, executive and judicial authority. The Governor acts as the ceremonial head of state and is the highest nominal authority of the state power. Chief Minister is the chief executive authority and head of the government, elected by people along with other ministers formally appointed by the Governor of West Bengal.

West Bengal is divided into 27 districts and 5 administrative divisions, making a total of 32 subnational entities. Kolkata is the capital of West Bengal. BBD Bagh in central Kolkata is the administrative Centre of the state, situating the executive headquarter of the state, the Writers' Building. Although due to scheduled repair & restoration work from May 2026 onwards, temporary functioning of the administration is conducted at the secretariat in Nabanna Building, Howrah.

West Bengal Government's formal seat is at Vidhan Sabha Bhavan, Kolkata, West Bengal which consists three primary branches are Legislative Power in the West Bengal Legislative Assembly (one housed), Executive Power in the Council of Ministers & Judicial Power in the Calcutta High Court with the official residence of Governor of West Bengal, the Lok Bhavan as head of state.

The present Legislative Assembly of West Bengal is unicameral, consisting of 294 Member of the Legislative Assembly (MLA). West Bengal Government formed by the Chief Minister & other ministers (Council of Ministers) belong to Member of the Legislative Assembly with the Chief Minister of West Bengal at its head. The current Chief Minister is Suvendu Adhikari, who assumed the office on 9 May 2026. He is one of the leader of the Bharatiya Janata Party (BJP) in West Bengal, which party won 208 seats (out of 294) in the 2026 West Bengal Legislative Assembly election.

== Nomenclature ==
The terms "GoWB", "WB Govt." etc. abbreviation, "The State Government of West Bengal", "Paschim Banga Sarkar", "Paścimbaṅga Sarakāra", "West Bengal Government (পশ্চিমবঙ্গ সরকার)" are often used officially and unofficially to refer to the same Government of West Bengal. The term Kolkata is commonly used as a metonym for the West Bengal Government, as the seat of the state government is in Kolkata.

== History ==
On 18 January 1862, under the Indian Councils Act 1861, a 12-member Legislative Council for Bengal was founded by the Governor-General of India with the Lt Governor of Bengal and some nominated members. The strength of this council was gradually increased by subsequent acts. Under the Indian Councils Act 1892, the maximum strength of the council was increased to 20 members out of which seven members were to be elected. After the Indian Councils Act 1909, the number was raised to 50 members.

== Structural Framework ==
The Government of West Bengal (GoWB) mainly composed by three main organs are the legislature, the executive, and the judiciary where the powers are vested by the constitution in the State Council of Ministers, Vidhan Sabha, and the Calcutta High Court, respectively. The Governor of West Bengal is the politically neutral head of state and acts as the Chancellor of the universities of West Bengal appointed by the President of India while politically elected Chief Minister of West Bengal acts as the head of the executive and is responsible for running the Government of West Bengal. Vidhan Sabha is the unicameral legislature with single house which is Lower House (Bidhan Sabha).

== Head Leaders ==
Constitutional Posts
House	Portrait	Leader	Assumed office
Governor of West Bengal		R. N. Ravi	12 March 2026
Chief Minister of West Bengal		Suvendu Adhikari	9 May 2026
Speaker of the House West Bengal Legislative Assembly		Rathindra Bose	15 May 2026
Deputy Speaker of the House West Bengal Legislative Assembly		Vacant	
Leader of the House West Bengal Legislative Assembly		Suvendu Adhikari	9 May 2026
Deputy Leader of the House West Bengal Legislative Assembly		Shankar Ghosh	10 June 2026
Leader of the Opposition West Bengal Legislative Assembly		Ritabrata Banerjee	3 June 2026
Deputy Leader of the Opposition West Bengal Legislative Assembly		Sandipan Saha; Javed Ahmed Khan; Sabina Yeasmin; Seuli Saha	3 June 2026
Chief Justice of Calcutta High Court		Ravindra Vithalrao Ghuge	9 September 2026
Chief Secretary of West Bengal		Manoj Kumar Agarwal	11 May 2026

== Organization ==
=== Departments Overview ===
The West Bengal Government is divided into 54 different Departments Operating and functioning under various sectors of State.

Each Department Consists of administrative personnel hierarchy which balance Political oversight with permanent bureaucratic management with Political Leadership (The Apex) and Apolitical Senior Bureaucratic Hierarchy (The Secretariat, Commissioner & Nodal Officers).

The Apex Political Executive of any West Bengal Government Department belong with a Cabinet Minister (Minister-In-Charge) followed by Minister of State (MoS) or can be Minister of State Independent Charge MoS (I/C) without any Cabinet Minister where as Apolitical Senior Bureaucratic Hierarchy belong Additional Chief Secretary (ACS) / Principal Secretary / Secretary / Special Commissioner from Senior Indian Administrative Service (IAS) Cadre along with Joint Secretary / Deputy Secretary / Assistant Secretary / Under Secretary / Nodal Officer from Indian Administrative Service (IAS) or West Bengal Civil Service (Executive) W.B.C.S. (Exe.) or West Bengal Secretariat Service (WBSS).

List of Departments
Serial	Department	Headquarter
1	Agriculture	Nabanna, 3rd Floor, 325 Sarat Chatterjee Road, Howrah, West Bengal
2	Animal Resources Development	Prani Sampad Bhavan, LB-2 Block, Sector- III, Salt Lake City, Kolkata, West Bengal
3	Agricultural Marketing	Khadya Bhaban, B Block, 4th Floor, 11A Mirza Ghalib Street, Kolkata, West Bengal
4	Backward Classes Welfare	Administrative Building, SDO Bidhannagar, 4th Floor, DJ-4, Sector- II, Salt Lake, Kolkata, West Bengal
5	Consumer Affairs	Kreta Suraksha Bhawan, 3rd Floor, 11A Mirza Ghalib Street, Kolkata, West Bengal
6	Co-operation	New Secretariat Building, C Block, 3rd Floor, 1 Kiran Sankar Roy Road, Kolkata, West Bengal
7	Correctional Administration	Jessop Building, 1st Floor, 63 Netaji Subhas Road, Kolkata, West Bengal
8	Disaster Management and Civil Defence	Nabanna, 2nd Floor, 325 Sarat Chatterjee Road, Howrah, West Bengal
9	Environment	Prani Sampad Bhavan, LB-2 Block, 5th Floor, Sector- III, Salt Lake City, Kolkata, West Bengal
10	Finance	Nabanna, 12th Floor, 325 Sarat Chatterjee Road, Howrah, West Bengal
11	Fire and Emergency Services	Newtown Fire Station Building, 2nd & 3rd Floor, CF-7, Street Number 175, New Town, Kolkata, West Bengal
12	Fisheries	Benfish Bhawan (IT Tower), 7th & 8th Floor, 31-GN Block, Sector-V, Salt Lake, Kolkata, West Bengal
13	Food and Supplies	Khadyashree Bhavan, 11A Mirza Ghalib Street, Kolkata, West Bengal
14	Food Processing Industries and Horticulture	Benfish Bhawan (IT Tower), 4th & 6th Floor, 31-GN Block, Sector-V, Salt Lake, Kolkata, West Bengal
15	Forests	Aranya Bhawan, Block LA-10A, Sector- III, Salt Lake, Kolkata, West Bengal
16	Health and Family Welfare	Swasthya Bhawan, GN-29, Sector-V, Salt Lake, Kolkata, West Bengal
17	Higher Education	Bikash Bhavan, 5th, 6th, 8th & 10th Floor, DF Block, Sector- I, Salt Lake, Kolkata, West Bengal
18	Home and Hill Affairs	Nabanna, 4th Floor, 325 Sarat Chatterjee Road, Howrah, West Bengal
19	Housing	New Secretariat Building, A Block, 1st Floor, 1 Kiran Sankar Roy Road, Kolkata, West Bengal
20	Industry, Commerce and Enterprises	Shilpa Sadan, 6th Floor, 4 Abanindranath Tagore Sarani, Kolkata, West Bengal
21	Information & Cultural Affairs	Nabanna, 9th Floor, 325 Sarat Chatterjee Road, Howrah, West Bengal
22	Information Technology and Electronics	Monibhandar Building, 6th Floor, Webel Complex, EP & GP Block, Sector-V, Salt Lake, Kolkata, West Bengal
23	Irrigation and Waterways	Jalasampad Bhavan, 1st Floor, DF Block, Sector- I, Salt Lake, Kolkata, West Bengal
24	Judicial	Writers' Building, 1st Floor, Main Block, Binoy Badal Dinesh Bag North Road, Lal Dighi, Kolkata, West Bengal
25	Labour	New Secretariat Building, A Block, 12th Floor, 1 Kiran Sankar Roy Road, Kolkata, West Bengal
26	Land and Land Reforms and Refugee Relief and Rehabilitation	Nabanna, 6th Floor, 325 Sarat Chatterjee Road, Howrah, West Bengal
27	Law	Writers' Building, 4th Floor, G Block, Binoy Badal Dinesh Bag North Road, Lal Dighi, Kolkata, West Bengal
28	Mass Education Extension and Library Services	Bikash Bhavan, 5th Floor, DF Block, Sector- I, Salt Lake, Kolkata, West Bengal
29	Micro, Small and Medium Enterprises and Textiles	Shilpa Sadan, 8th Floor, 4 Abanindranath Tagore Sarani, Kolkata, West Bengal
30	Minority Affairs and Madrasah Education	Nabanna, 3rd Floor, 325 Sarat Chatterjee Road, Howrah, West Bengal
31	Non-Conventional and Renewable Energy Sources	Bikalpa Shakti Bhavan, 1st Floor, J-1/10, EP & GP Block, Sector-V, Salt Lake, Kolkata, West Bengal
32	North Bengal Development	HQ 1. Uttar Kanya, Burdwan Road, Satellite Township, Kamrangaguri, Fulbari, Siliguri, West Bengal HQ 2. Mitra Building, 4th Floor, 8 Lyons Range, Kolkata, West Bengal
33	Panchayats and Rural Development	Joint Administrative Building, 8th Floor, Wing B, Block - HC7, Sector- III, Salt Lake, Kolkata, West Bengal
34	Parliamentary Affairs	Poura Bhawan, FD-415A, 5th Floor, Sector- III, Salt Lake, Kolkata, West Bengal
35	Paschimanchal Unnayan Affairs	Poura Bhawan, FD-415A, 5th Floor, Sector- III, Salt Lake, Kolkata, West Bengal
36	Personnel and Administrative Reforms	Nabanna, 7th Floor, 325 Sarat Chatterjee Road, Howrah, West Bengal
37	Planning and Statistics	Joint Administrative Building, 4th Floor, Wing B, Block - HC7, Sector- III, Salt Lake, Kolkata, West Bengal
38	Power	Bidyut Unnayan Bhavan, 3/C, LA Block, 5th & 6th Floor, Sector- III, Salt Lake, Kolkata, West Bengal
39	Programme Monitoring	Joint Administrative Building, 4th Floor, Wing B, Block - HC7, Sector- III, Salt Lake, Kolkata, West Bengal
40	Public Enterprises and Industrial Reconstruction	Shilpa Sadan, 2nd Floor, 4 Abanindranath Tagore Sarani, Kolkata, West Bengal
41	Public Health Engineering	Janaswasthya Karigari Bhawan (NIJALAYA), 7th Floor, CN Block, Sector-V, Salt Lake, Kolkata, West Bengal
42	Public Works	Nabanna, 8th Floor, 325 Sarat Chatterjee Road, Howrah, West Bengal
43	School Education	Bikash Bhavan, 5th & 6th Floor, DF Block, Sector- I, Salt Lake, Kolkata, West Bengal
44	Science and Technology and Biotechnology	Vigyan Chetana Bhavan, 26/B, DD Block, Sector- I, Salt Lake, Kolkata, West Bengal
45	Self Help Group and Self Employment	Kreta Suraksha Bhawan, 1st Floor, 11A Mirza Ghalib Street, Kolkata, West Bengal
46	Sundarban Affairs	Mayukh Bhawan, 3rd Floor, DF Block, Sector- I, Salt Lake, Kolkata, West Bengal
47	Technical Education, Training & Skill Development	Karigari Bhawan, AA-III, 2nd Floor, New Town Road, Rajarhat, Kolkata, West Bengal
48	Tourism	New Secretariat Building, C Block, 3rd Floor, 1 Kiran Sankar Roy Road, Kolkata, West Bengal
49	Transport	Paribahan Bhawan, 12 RN Mukherjee Road, Bow Barracks, Kolkata, West Bengal
50	Tribal Development	Adivasi Bhawan, Action Area - IIIA, New Town, Rajarhat, Kolkata, West Bengal
51	Urban Development and Municipal Affairs	Nagarayan, DF-8, Sector-I, Salt Lake, Kolkata, West Bengal
52	Water resources Investigation and Development	Khadya Bhaban, A Block, 5th Floor, 11A Mirza Ghalib Street, Kolkata, West Bengal
53	Women and Child Development and Social Welfare	Bikash Bhavan, 10th Floor, DF Block, Sector- I, Salt Lake, Kolkata, West Bengal
54	Youth Services and Sports	New Secretariat Building, A Block, 6th Floor, 1 Kiran Sankar Roy Road, Kolkata, West Bengal

=== Chief Secretary & Secretaries - Government of West Bengal Departments ===
Chief Secretary to the Government of West Bengal and Secretaries (i.e. Additional Chief Secretary or Principal Secretary / Secretary) under different Government Departments in West Bengal are appointed by the Governor of West Bengal "by appointment order" through the recommendation from Chief Minister's Cabinet and Personnel & Administrative Reforms Department (P&AR).

Chief Secretary to the Government of West Bengal is an officer (Civil servant) of the Indian Administrative Service (IAS) belong from Senior most cadre post & Principal advisor to the Chief Minister of West Bengal on all matters in the state administration.

Additional Chief Secretaries or Principal Secretaries / Secretaries are the administrative heads of various Government Departments which they are assigned to handle by the Governor of West Bengal also belong from Indian Administrative Service (IAS) Civil servant cadre.

List of Secretaries under Departments
Serial	Department	Secretary
1	Chief Secretary to the Government of West Bengal	Shri Manoj Kumar Agarwal, IAS
2	Agriculture	Principal Secretary, Shri Onkar Singh Meena, IAS
3	Animal Resources Development	Principal Secretary (additional charge), Shri Rajesh Kumar Sinha, IAS
4	Agricultural Marketing	Principal Secretary (additional charge), Shri Onkar Singh Meena, IAS
5	Backward Classes Welfare	Secretary, Shri Sanjay Bansal, IAS
6	Consumer Affairs	Special Secretary, Ms. Priyadarshini S., IAS
7	Co-operation	Additional Chief Secretary, Dr. Krishna Gupta, IAS
8	Correctional Administration	Secretary, Smt. Smaraki Mahapatra, IAS
9	Disaster Management and Civil Defence	Principal Secretary, Shri Rajesh Kumar Sinha, IAS
10	Environment	Additional Chief Secretary (additional charge), Smt. Roshni Sen, IAS
11	Finance	Additional Chief Secretary, Shri Prabhat Kumar Mishra, IAS
12	Fire and Emergency Services	Additional Chief Secretary, Shri Khalil Ahmed, IAS
13	Fisheries	Additional Chief Secretary, Smt. Roshni Sen, IAS
14	Food and Supplies	Secretary, Shri Jagadish Prasad Meena, IAS
15	Food Processing Industries and Horticulture	Principal Secretary (additional charge), Shri Onkar Singh Meena, IAS
16	Forests	Additional Chief Secretary, Shri Manish Jain, IAS
17	Health and Family Welfare	Principal Secretary, Shri Narayan Swaroop Nigam, IAS
18	Higher Education	Additional Chief Secretary (additional charge), Shri Binod Kumar, IAS
19	Home and Hill Affairs	Principal Secretary, Smt. Sanghamitra Ghosh, IAS
20	Housing	Additional Chief Secretary (additional charge), Smt. Nandini Chakravorty, IAS
21	Industry, Commerce and Enterprises	Principal Secretary, Smt. Vandana Yadav, IAS
22	Information & Cultural Affairs	Principal Secretary, Shri Santanu Basu, IAS
23	Information Technology and Electronics	Secretary (additional charge), Shri Shubhanjan Das, IAS
24	Irrigation and Waterways	Additional Chief Secretary (additional charge), Dr. Krishna Gupta, IAS
25	Judicial	Principal Secretary, Shri Siddhartha Kanjilal, WBJS
26	Labour	Secretary, Smt. Rachna Bhagat, IAS
27	Land and Land Reforms and Refugee Relief and Rehabilitation	Principal Secretary, Shri Surendra Gupta, IAS
28	Law	Principal Secretary, Shri Subhradip Mitra, WBJS
29	Mass Education Extension and Library Services	Additional Chief Secretary (additional charge), Shri Binod Kumar, IAS
30	Micro, Small and Medium Enterprises and Textiles	Additional Chief Secretary (additional charge), Shri Anoop Kumar Agrawal, IAS
31	Minority Affairs and Madrasah Education	Principal Secretary, Dr. P.B Salim, IAS
32	Non-Conventional and Renewable Energy Sources	Additional Chief Secretary, Shri Barun Kumar Ray, IAS
33	North Bengal Development	Secretary, Smt. R. Vimala, IAS
34	Panchayats and Rural Development	Senior Special Secretary, Shri Prasenjit Hans, IAS
35	Parliamentary Affairs	Principal Secretary (additional charge), Smt. Sanghamitra Ghosh, IAS
36	Paschimanchal Unnayan Affairs	Principal Secretary (additional charge), Smt. Choten Dhendup Lama, IAS
37	Personnel and Administrative Reforms	Senior Special Secretary, Shri Sudeep Mitra, IAS
38	Planning and Statistics	Additional Chief Secretary (additional charge), Shri Prabhat Kumar Mishra, IAS
39	Power	Principal Secretary (additional charge), Shri Santanu Basu, IAS
40	Programme Monitoring	Principal Secretary (additional charge), Dr. P.B. Salim, IAS
41	Public Enterprises and Industrial Reconstruction	Principal Secretary (additional charge), Smt. Vandana Yadav, IAS
42	Public Health Engineering	Principal Secretary (additional charge), Shri Narayan Swaroop Nigam, IAS
43	Public Works	Secretary, Smt. Antara Acharya, IAS
44	School Education	Additional Chief Secretary, Shri Binod Kumar, IAS
45	Science and Technology and Biotechnology	Additional Chief Secretary, Smt. Nandini Chakravorty, IAS
46	Self Help Group and Self Employment	Secretary, Smt. Sujata Ghosh, IAS
47	Sundarban Affairs	Secretary, Smt. Mukta Arya, IAS
48	Technical Education, Training & Skill Development	Additional Chief Secretary (additional charge), Shri Binod Kumar, IAS
49	Tourism	Additional Chief Secretary (additional charge), Shri Barun Kumar Ray, IAS
50	Transport	Principal Secretary, Dr. Ravi Inder Singh, IAS
51	Tribal Development	Principal Secretary, Smt. Choten Dhendup Lama, IAS
52	Urban Development and Municipal Affairs	Senior Special Secretary, Smt. Debarati Datta Gupta, IAS
53	Water resources Investigation and Development	Secretary (additional charge), Shri Sanjay Bansal, IAS
54	Women and Child Development and Social Welfare	Secretary, Smt. Moumita Godara Basu, IAS
55	Youth Services and Sports	Additional Chief Secretary, Shri Rajesh Pandey, IAS
