= Kolkata metropolitan area =

Coordinates: 22.5411°N 88.3378°E

Kolkata Metropolitan Area Greater Kolkata
- Megacity and Metropolitan Area
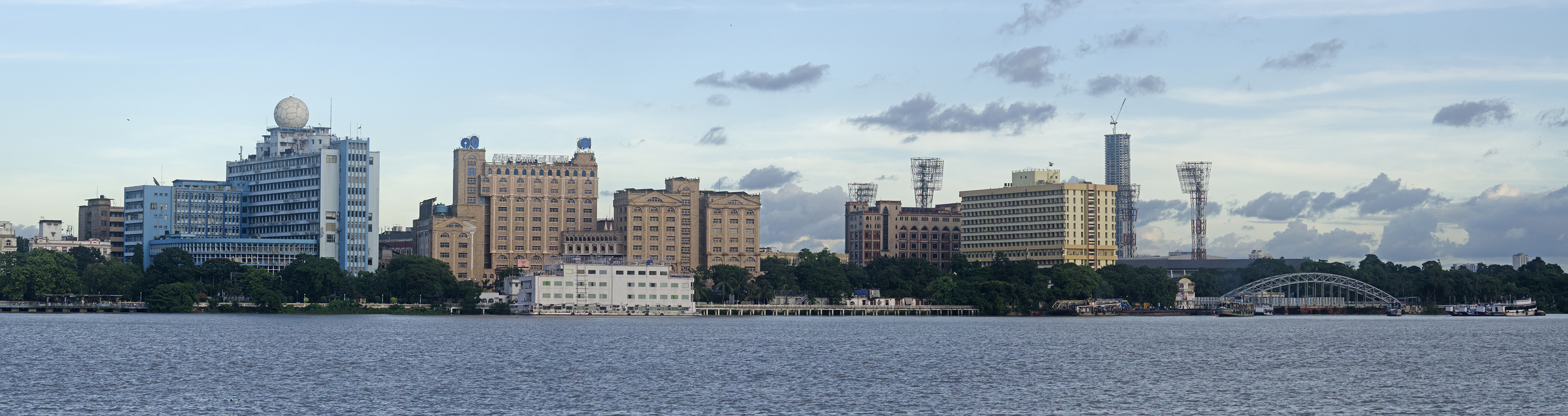
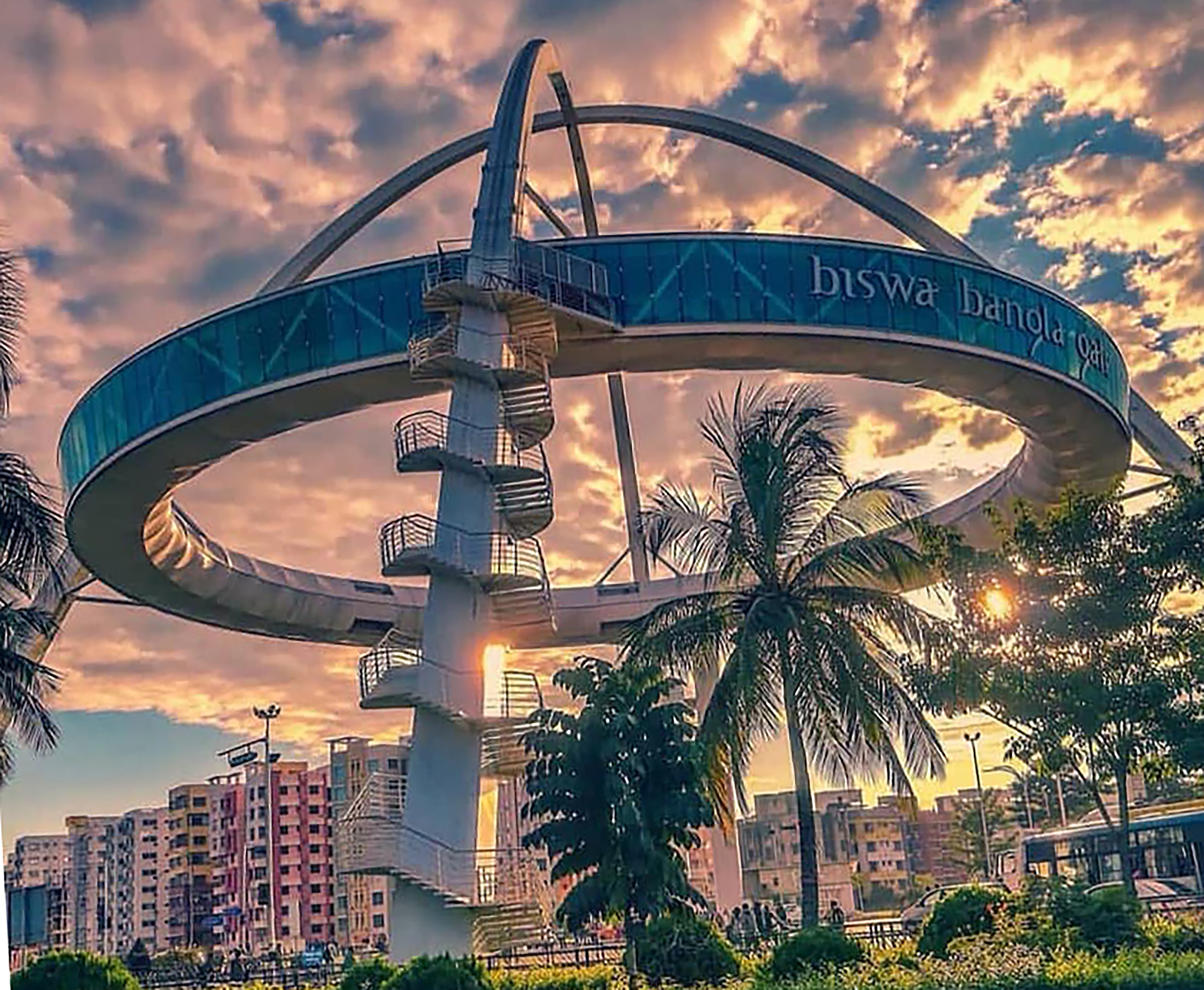
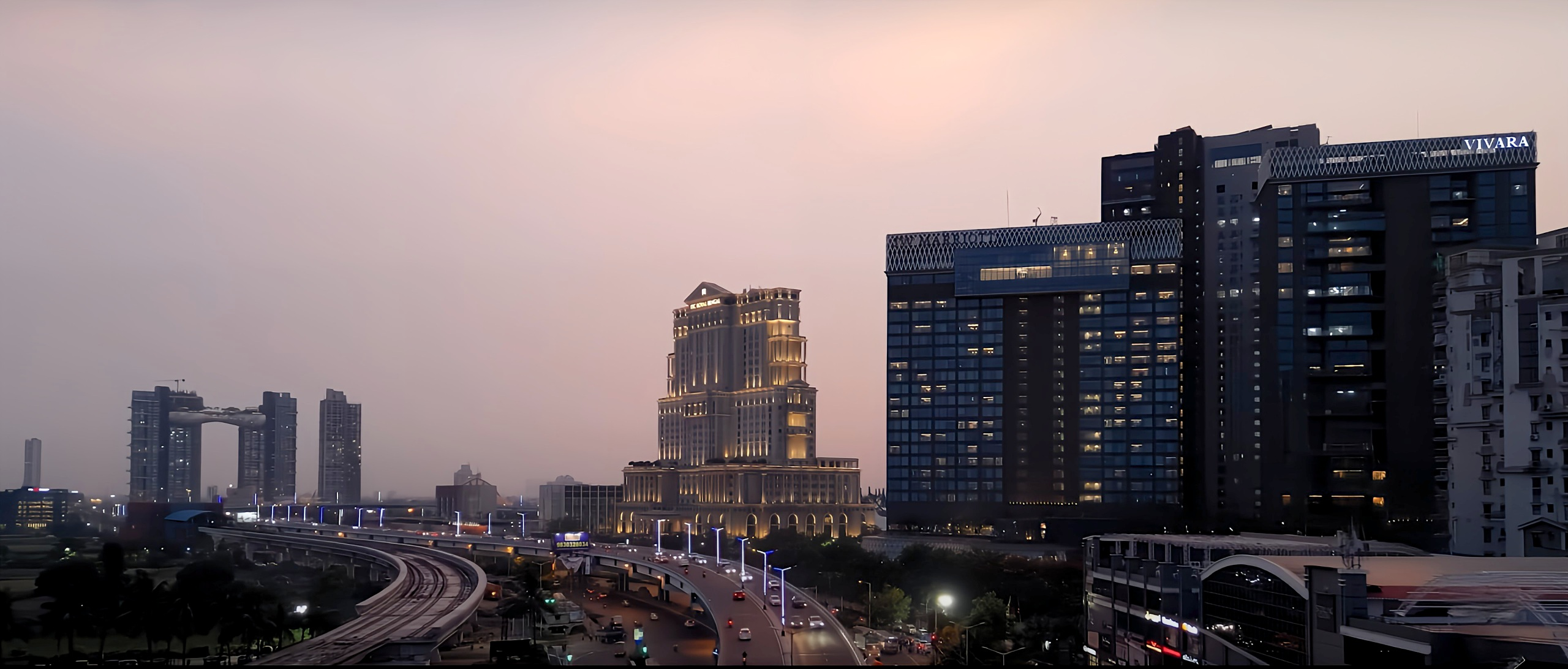
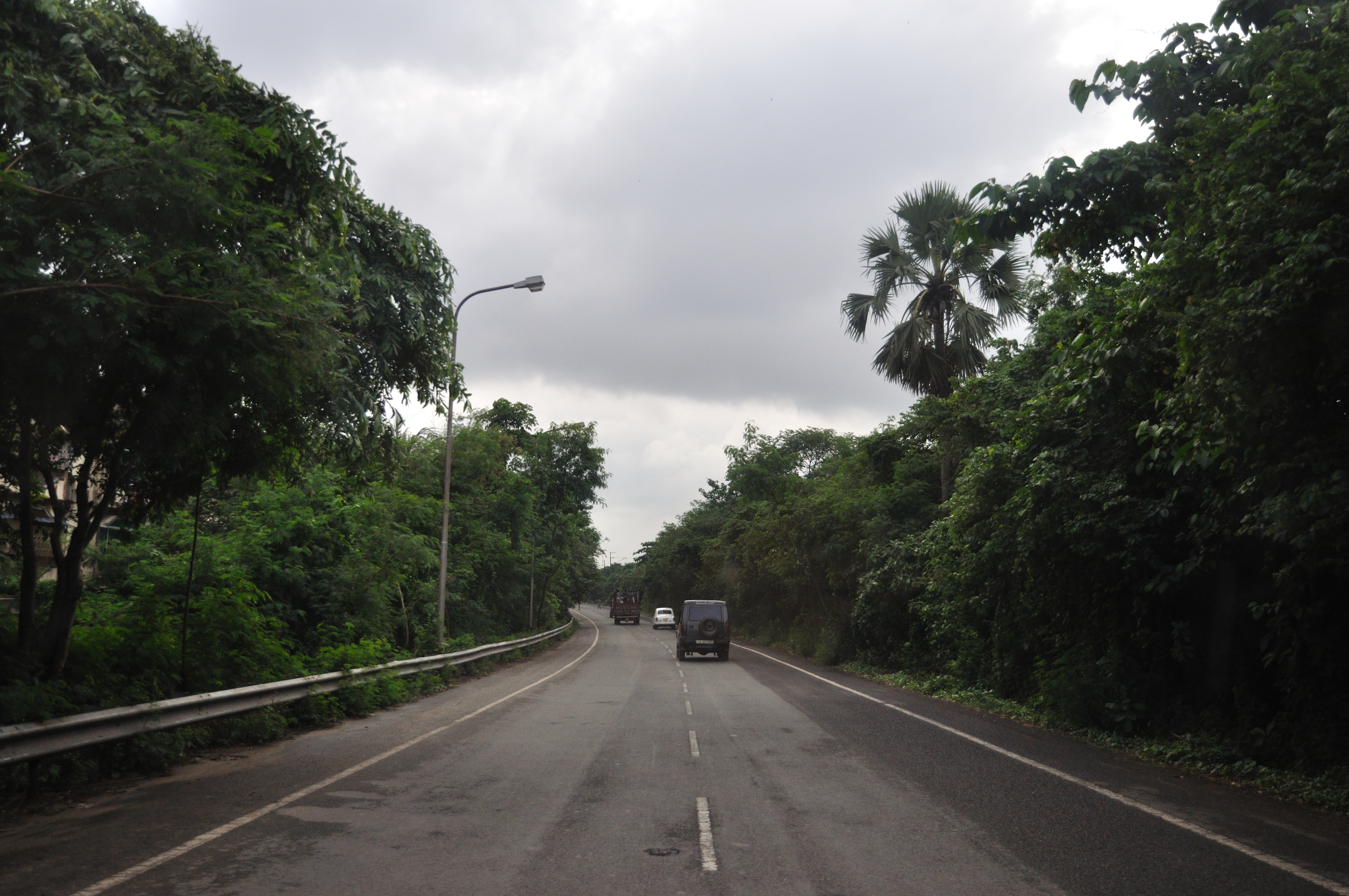
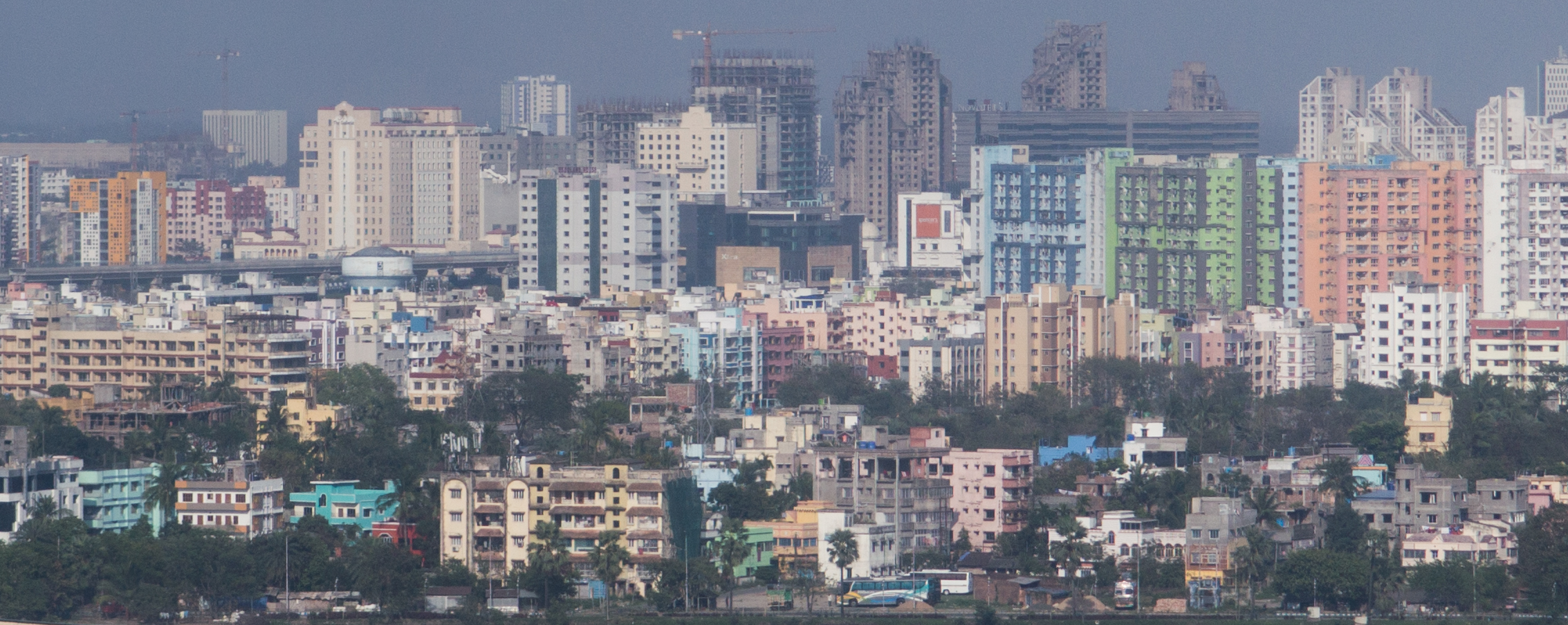
- Kolkata skyline along Hooghly river Biswa Bangla Gate at New Town EM Bypass Kolkata Belghoria Expressway New Town, major satellite city and CBD of Kolkata
- Interactive map of Kolkata Metropolitan Area
- Country: India
- State: West Bengal
- Core city: Kolkata
- Districts: Kolkata; North 24 Parganas; South 24 Parganas; Howrah; Hooghly; Nadia

Government
  - Body: Kolkata Metropolitan Development Authority

Area
  - Urban: 1,056.13 km^{2} (407.77 sq mi)
  - Metro: 1,876 km^{2} (724 sq mi)

Population (2011)
  - Estimate (2025): ▲22,549,738
  - Rank: 2nd in India
  - Urban: 14,057,991
  - Urban density: 13,310.9/km^{2} (34,475.0/sq mi)
  - Metro: 22,549,738
  - Metro density: 12,020/km^{2} (31,130/sq mi)
- Time zone: UTC+5.30 (IST)
- GDP PPP: ▲US$224 billion
- Website: kmda.wb.gov.in

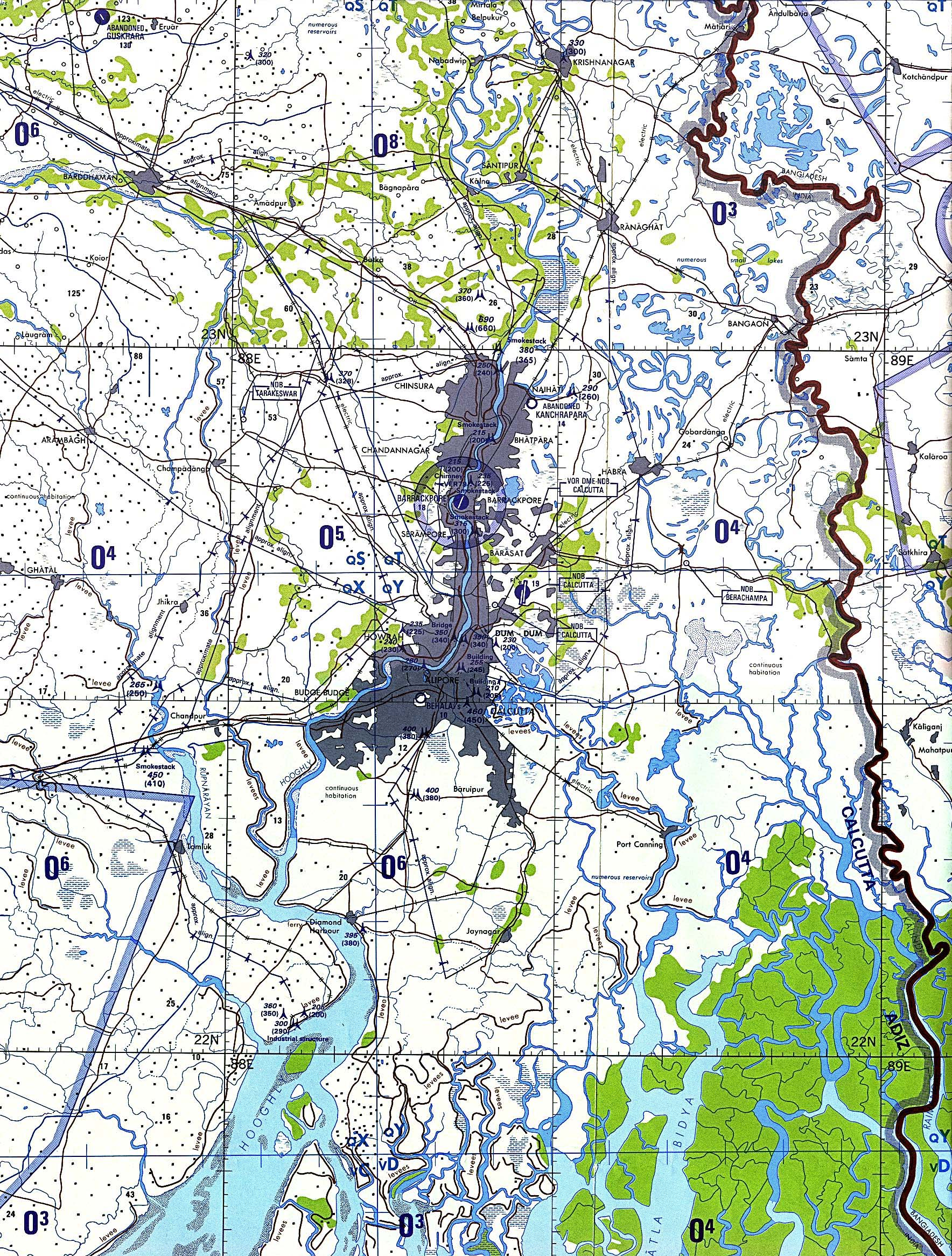
An illustration of the Kolkata Metropolitan Region

The Kolkata Metropolitan Area (abbreviated KMA; formerly Calcutta Metropolitan Area), also known as Greater Kolkata, is the urban agglomeration of the city of Kolkata in the Indian state of West Bengal. It is the third most populous metropolitan area in India after Delhi and Mumbai. The area is administered by the Kolkata Metropolitan Development Authority (KMDA).

== History ==
What is now the KMA was first legally defined as the Calcutta Metropolitan Planning Area in the schedule of the Calcutta Metropolitan Planning Area (Use and Development of Land) Control Act, 1965 (West Bengal Act XIV of 1965). After repeal of that Act, the area was redefined as the Calcutta Metropolitan Area (CMA) in the first schedule of West Bengal Town and Country (Planning and Development) Act, 1979 (West Bengal Act XIII of 1979).

== Jurisdiction ==
The area covers 4 municipal corporations along with 38 Municipalities.

Jurisdiction
Settlements	Name	Total
Municipal Corporations	Kolkata Municipal Corporation; Bidhannagar Municipal Corporation; Howrah Municipal Corporation; Chandernagore Municipal Corporation	4
Municipalities	1. North 24 Parganas district; Baranagar, Barasat, Barrackpore, Bhatpara, Dum Dum, Garulia, Halisahar, Kamarhati, Kanchrapara, Khardah, Madhyamgram, Naihati, New Barrackpore, North Barrackpur, North Dumdum, Panihati, South Dumdum, Titagarh: 2. South 24 Parganas district; Baruipur, Budge Budge, Jaynagar Majilpur, Maheshtala, Pujali, Rajpur Sonarpur: 3. Hooghly district; Baidyabati, Bhadreswar, Bansberia, Champdani, Dankuni, Hugli Chuchura, Konnagar, Rishra, Serampore, Uttarpara Kotrung: 4. Howrah district; Uluberia: 5. Nadia district; Gayespur, Haringhata, Kalyani	38

== Demographics ==
According to the 2011 census data, the total population of the Kolkata metropolitan area was 14,112,536. KMDA report states the total area is 1,888 km^{2}, making the population density 7,480 per km^{2}.

== See also ==
- Mumbai metropolitan area
- Chennai metropolitan area
- Delhi metropolitan area
- List of metropolitan areas in Asia by population
