= List of projects by HIDCO =

West Bengal Housing Infrastructure Development Corporation or HIDCO is a Government of West Bengal owned public sector undertaking which has been engaged in major construction and housing projects throughout the state although most of their projects are based in New Town, Kolkata. This a list of notable projects executed or being executed by HIDCO.

Key
denotes under construction
denotes proposed
denotes scrapped or discontinued

== Large area projects ==
Name	Location	Opened/ established	Notes/ details	Ref(s)
Bengal Silicon Valley Tech Hub	New Town	2018	250 Acres; Region specialized for IT and Data centers	
FinTech Hub, Kolkata	New Town	2010	70 Acres; Region specialized for financial and legal companies	

== Convention centers and auditorium complexes ==
Name	Location	Opened/ established	Notes	Ref(s)
Biswa Bangla Convention Centre	New Town, Kolkata	2017	Largest convention centre in East India	
Dhanadhanya Auditorium	Alipore, Kolkata	2023	Multi-auditorium complex shaped like a conch	

== Housing and township projects ==
Name	Location	Opened/ established	Notes	Ref(s)
Gitabitan Township	Shibpur near Santiniketan, Birbhum	2017	Township project	
Snehadiya	New Town, Kolkata		Old age home	
Affordable Housing Project	New Town, Kolkata		Apartment complex	

== Parks and recreational projects ==
Name	Location	Opened/ established	Notes	Ref(s)
New Town Eco Park	New Town	2012	India's largest urban park (as of 2024)	
Eco Urban Village	New Town	2014	Large picnic spot	
Swapna Bhor	New Town	2015	Dedicated park for senior citizens	

== Museums ==
Name	Location	Opened/ established	Notes	Ref(s)
Mother's Wax Museum	New Town, Kolkata	2014		
New Town Aircraft museum	New Town, Kolkata	2022	India's second naval aircraft museum	
Alipore Jail Museum	Alipore, Kolkata	2019		
New Town Tribal museum	New Town, Kolkata	2021		
Kolkata Museum of Modern Art	New Town, Kolkata	Proposed		

== Cultural and exhibition centers ==
Name	Location	Opened/ established	Notes	Ref(s)
Rabindra Tirtha	New Town, Kolkata	2012		
Nazrul Tirtha	New Town, Kolkata	2014		
Biswa Bangla Exhibition Centre	New Town, Kolkata	2023		

== Transport projects ==
Name	Location	Opened/ established	Notes	Ref(s)
Narkelbagan Underpass	New Town, Kolkata	2023	Kolkata's first multi tier underpass	
Bagjola Canal Bridge	New Town, Kolkata		2031	
New Town major arterial road expansion	New Town, Kolkata	Under construction	10 lane high speed corridor	
New Town international bus terminus	New Town, Kolkata	Under construction		
Kolkata LRT Narkelbagan- Hatisala route	New Town, Kolkata	Proposed		
Kolkata Monorail Bidhannagar- New Town route	KMA	Proposed		
Vehicular and pedestrian underpass near Tata Medical Centre	New Town, Kolkata	Proposed		
Vehicular and pedestrian underpass near St. Xavier's University	New Town, Kolkata	Proposed		
Vehicular underpass near Westin	New Town, Kolkata	Proposed		
Vehicular underpass near Chinar park	New Town, Kolkata	Proposed		
Vehicular underpass near Noapara	New Town, Kolkata	Proposed		
Vehicular underpass near Shrachi more	New Town, Kolkata	Proposed		

== Sport projects ==
Name	Location	Opened/ established	Notes	Ref(s)
Eco Park Golf Arena	New Town, Kolkata		Golf course	
Dumurjala Sports City	Howrah	2022	Large sport complex of 60 Acres	
Cycle velodrome	New Town, Kolkata	Under construction	State's first cycle velodrome	

== Other projects ==
Name	Location	Opened/ established	Notes/details	Ref(s)
Biswa Bangla Gate	New Town, Kolkata	2019	Arch monument and India's first hanging restaurant	
Jagannath Temple	Digha	2025		
Happy Works working pod	New Town, Kolkata	2021	Dedicated office space for startups	
