= Vivek Tirtha =

Cultural and educational centre in Kolkata, India

- Interactive map of the Vivek Tirtha area
- Alternative names: Ramakrishna Mission Vivekananda Centre for Human Excellence and Social Sciences

General information
- Status: Under construction
- Location: Action Area II, New Town, Kolkata, West Bengal, 700 156, India
- Coordinates: 22.5933°N 88.4726°E
- Groundbreaking: 11 November 2014; 11 years ago
- Construction started: 3 March 2016; 9 years ago
- Cost: ₹160 crore (equivalent to ₹188 crore or US$22 million in 2023)

Technical details
- Grounds: 5 acres (220,000 sq ft)

Other information
- Public transit access: Eco Park metro station

Website
- belurmath.org/ramakrishna-mission-new-town-viveka-tirtha

Vivek Tirtha (in English: Vivek Pilgrimage) or Ramakrishna Mission Vivekananda Centre for Human Excellence and Social Sciences is a cultural and education centre dedicated to Swami Vivekananda in New Town, Kolkata, West Bengal, India. Chief Minister Mamata Banerjee laid the foundation stone of Vivek Tirtha on 11 November 2014. Its stated aim is to help people to live a life of peace and happiness.

== Location ==
Vivek Tirtha is located in Action Area II, New Town, Kolkata, West Bengal; on Biswa Bangla Sarani, beside the Eco Park Gate no. 1. It will be catered by Eco Park metro station of Kolkata Metro Orange Line.

== Details ==
The Vivek Tirtha or Ramakrishna Mission Vivekananda Centre for Human Excellence and Social Sciences is a cultural and education centre, owned by Ramakrishna Mission. In 2013, Government of West Bengal proposed the centre, and on 11 November 2014 Chief Minister Mamata Banerjee, with the General Secretary of Ramakrishna Math and Mission Swami Suhitanandaji laid the foundation stone. It consists of a 10-storey main building and four other buildings named after Sister Nivedita, J. J. Goodwin, Ole Sara Bull and Josephine MacLeod, the four famous foreign disciples of Swami Vivekananda. The main building is being designed like the Art Institute of Chicago, where Swami Vivekananda delivered his speech on 11 September 1893. It houses the administrative offices and a 1,400 seater auditorium. Other buildings have the digital library, exhibition hall and meditation room. The campus is spread over a 5 acres (220,000 sq ft) area. Construction work started in March 2016, 2 years after foundation. It is developed at a cost of ₹160 crore (equivalent to ₹188 crore or US$22 million in 2023). West Bengal State Council of Higher Education and Nabadiganta Industrial Township Authority donated ₹2 crore (equivalent to ₹2.7 crore or US$320,000 in 2023) and ₹7 crore (equivalent to ₹9.4 crore or US$1.1 million in 2023) respectively. Corporates and PSUs also donated towards the construction of the centre. Courses like personality development, communication skills, motivation for parents, stress management, mind management will be offered at the centre.

== See also ==
- HIDCO
- Nazrul Tirtha
