= New Town Convention Centre =

Convention Centre in Kolkata, India

- Interactive map of New Town Convention Centre
- Address: Biswa Bangla Sarani, Block-DG, New Town, 700156
- Location: Kolkata, West Bengal, India
- Coordinates: 22°34′57.9″N 88°28′26.6″E
- Owner: HIDCO (Government of West Bengal)
- Operator: HIDCO
- Capacity: 3000 — 4000
- Public transit: Biswa Bangla Convention Centre metro station (under construction)

Construction
- Cost: ₹500 crore (equivalent to ₹701 crore or US$73 million in 2023)
- Architects: Dulal Mukherjee & Associates

Website
- www.wbhidcoltd.com/projects/convention-centre

New Town Convention Centre is a convention centre in New Town, West Bengal, India. It was built by West Bengal Housing Infrastructure Development Corporation (HIDCO) and opened in the year 2017. It was built to attract meetings, incentives, conferences and exhibitions (MICE) tourism in the city.

== Location ==
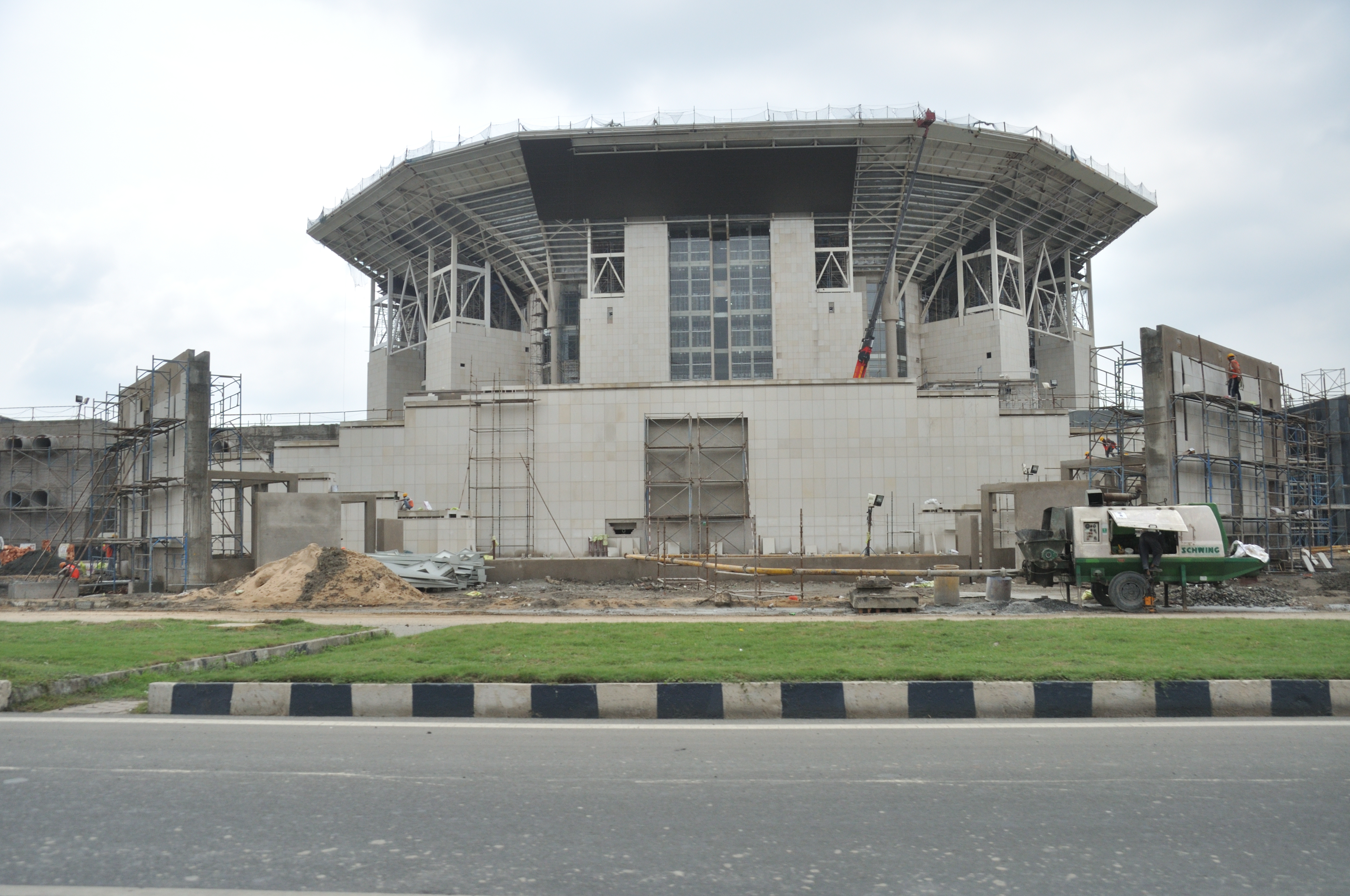
Under construction Biswa Bangla Convention Centre in 2017

It is located on Biswa Bangla Sarani, Action Area I of New Town, near Biswa Bangla Gate. Other nearby notable structures include Rabindra Tirtha, Naval Aircraft Museum and Presidency University New Town Campus. The under construction Biswa Bangla Convention Centre metro station (previously CBD 1 metro station) of Kolkata Metro Orange Line will serve this area. The earlier named Convention Centre metro station was renamed to be the Eco Park metro station. It is 10 kilometres (6.2 mi) from Netaji Subhash Chandra Bose International Airport and 14 kilometres (8.7 mi) from Bidhannagar Road railway station.

== Details ==
It is a ten-storeyed building which houses a convention hall, two auditoriums and four banquet cum exhibition halls, with each having 3200 seats, 400 seats and 270–72 seats respectively. There are 822 parking spaces, executive lounges, swimming pool, gymnasiums etc. It also has a hotel behind the main building, with 100 rooms, which is operated on a Public Private Partnership (PPP) basis. The convention centre is spread over a 40,470 square metres (435,600 sq ft) area, with total built up area of 56,932 square metres (612,810 sq ft) which includes parking spaces, roads and service areas. The total cost of construction was ₹500 crore (equivalent to ₹701 crore or US$73 million in 2023). Larsen & Toubro was the contractor and Dulal Mukherjee & Associates was the architecture firm behind this project. The basic idea was taken from Vigyan Bhavan, a convention centre in Delhi. It is one of the largest convention centre in India and South Asia. With this Kolkata became a meetings, incentives, conferences and exhibitions (MICE) destination in the country. The convention centre was also used for COVID-19 vaccination drive.

== See also ==
- Rabindra Sadan
