= New Town Plaza, Rajarhat =

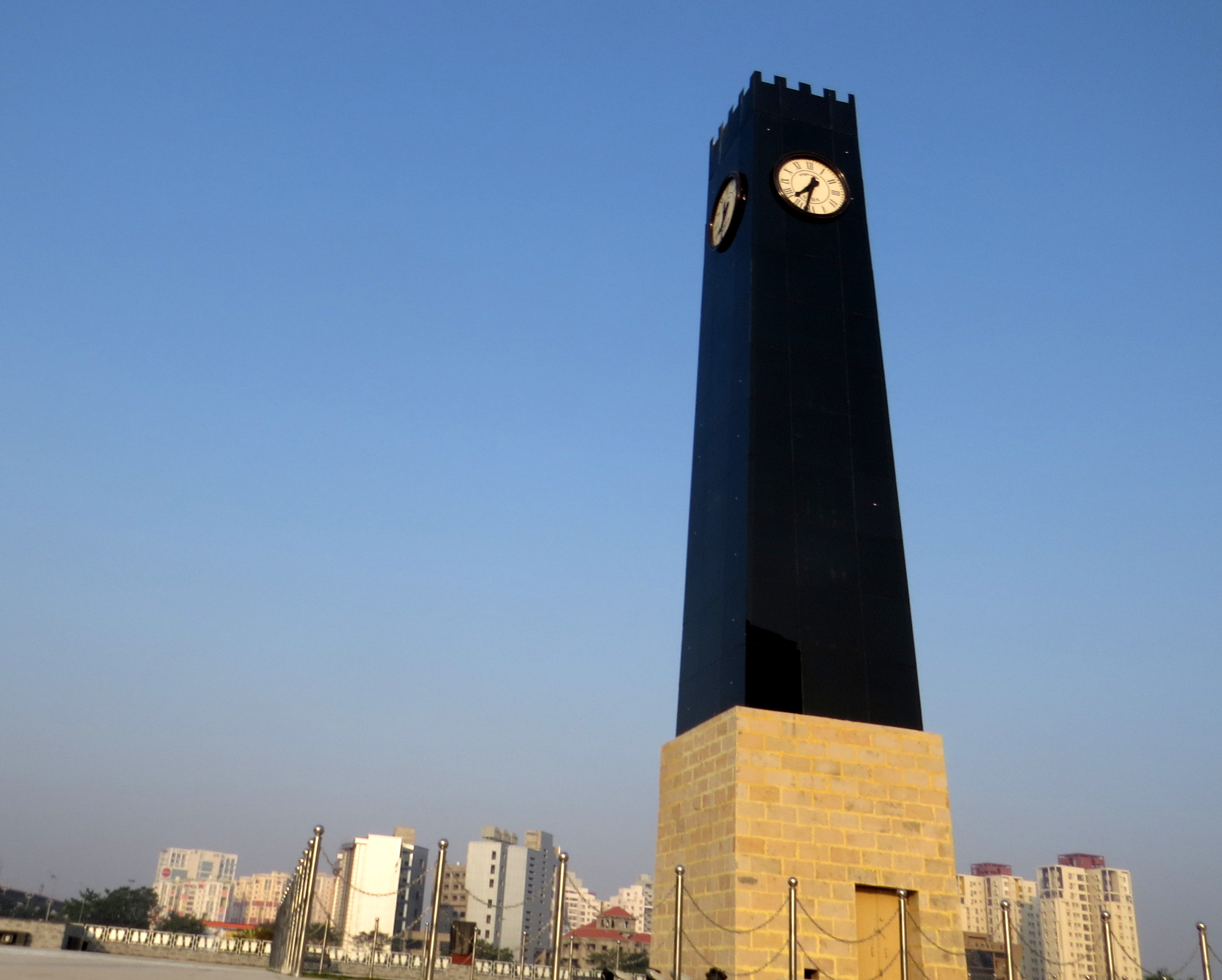

General information
- Type: Modern
- Architectural style: Modern
- Location: Beside HomeTown, Near Axis Mall, New Town, Kolkata, West Bengal, India
- Completed: 2014-2015

New Town Plaza is a modern center having fountains, laser light-show and clock. The center is situated at Action Area 1, New Town (few meters away from Home Town & Axis Mall).

== Architecture and design ==
The design and architecture of the place is unique in Kolkata.

== See also ==
- HIDCO

== Gallery ==
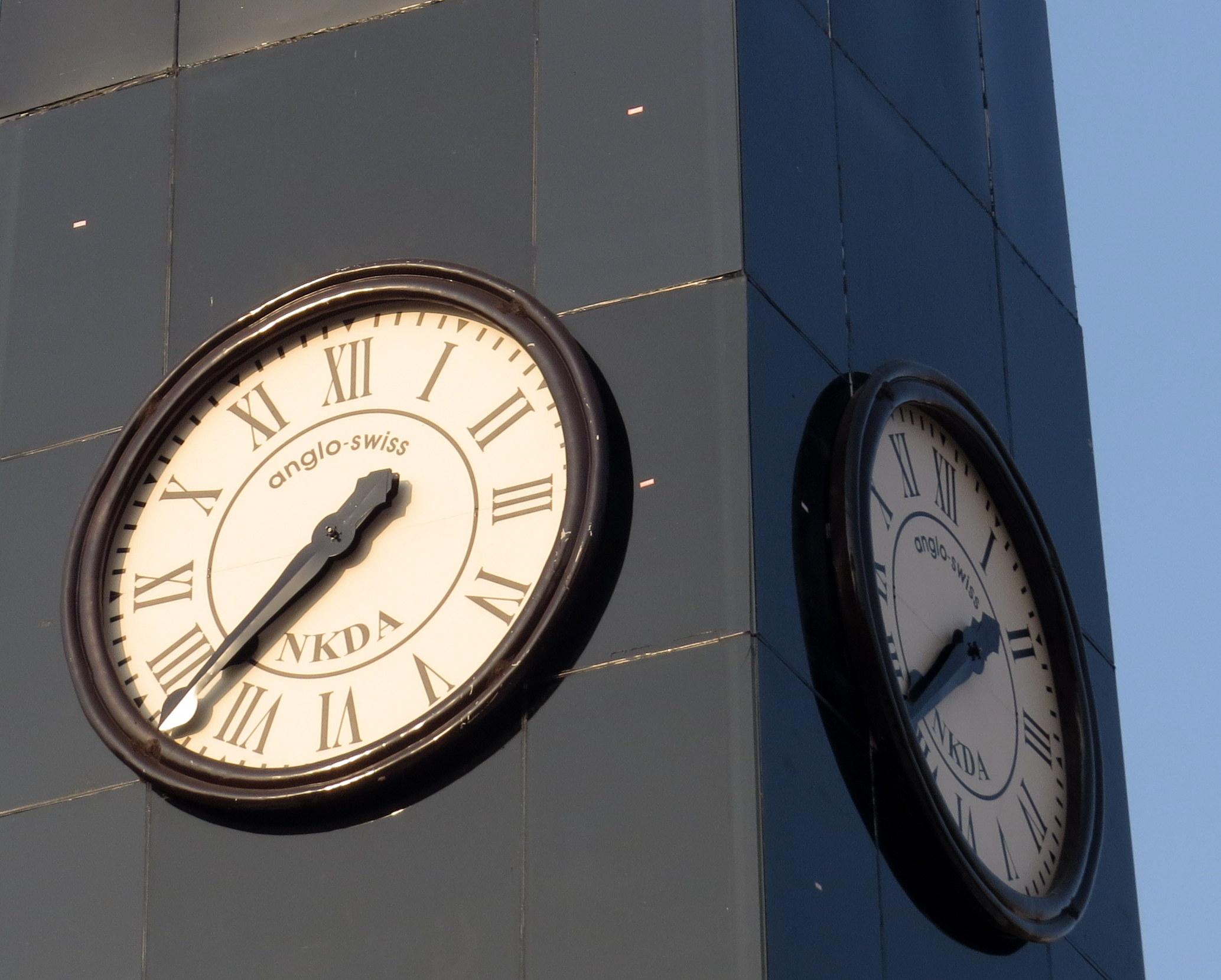
New Town Plaza Clock
