= List of urban parks in India by size =

Below is a list of urban parks in India by size. Urban parks refer to the public urban green spaces contained entirely within an urban city's municipal or metropolitan boundary. The list does not contain any National parks, biological parks, botanical gardens, zoological parks or natural parks.

== List ==
Rank	Name	City/ Metropolitan area	State/UT	Urban green space	Ref(s)
1	Eco Park, New Town	New Town, Kolkata Metropolitan Area	West Bengal	480 Acres	
2	Maidan	Kolkata	West Bengal	400 Acres	
3	Janeshwar Mishra Park	Lucknow	Uttar Pradesh	375 Acres	
4	Cubhon Park (Sri Chamarajendra Park)	Bengaluru	Karnataka	300 Acres	
5	Swarn Jayanti Park	Rohini, National Capital Region	Delhi	237 Acres	
6	Central Park, Kharghar	Navi Mumbai, Mumbai Metropolitan Region	Maharashtra	290 Acres	
7	Jubilee Park, Jamshedpur	Jamshedpur	Jharkhand	200 Acres	
8	Aastha Kunj	New Delhi	Delhi	200 Acres	
9	Rabindra Sarobar	Kolkata	West Bengal	192 Acres	
10	Central Park, Salt Lake	Bidhannagar, Kolkata Metropolitan Area	West Bengal	152 Acres	
11	Chandrashekhar Azad Park	Prayagraj	Uttar Pradesh	133 Acres	
12	Ambedkar Memorial Park	Lucknow	Uttar Pradesh	108 Acres	
13	Sanjeevaiah Park	Hyderabad	Telangana	92 Acres	
14	Sunder Nursery	New Delhi	Delhi	90 Acres	
15	Lodi Gardens	New Delhi	Delhi	90 Acres	
16	Buddha Jayanti Park	New Delhi	Delhi	81 Acres	
17	Mohan Kumar Mangalam Park	Durgapur	West Bengal	80 Acres	
18	Atal Bihari Vajpayee Regional Park	Indore	Madhya Pradesh	80 Acres	
19	Ram Manohar Lohia Park, Lucknow	Lucknow	Uttar Pradesh	76 Acres	
20	Indira Park, Hyderabad	Hyderabad	Telangana	76 Acres	
21	Nehru Park, Delhi	New Delhi	Delhi	75 Acres	
22	Subhas Sarobar Park	Kolkata	West Bengal	73 Acres	
23	Nehru Park, Burnpur	Asansol	West Bengal	64 Acres	
24	Victoria Memorial Gardens	Kolkata	West Bengal	64 Acres	
25	Gandhi Maidan	Patna	Bihar	62 Acres	
26	Brindavan Gardens	Mysore	Karnataka	60 Acres	
27	NTR Gardens	Hyderabad	Telangana	55 Acres	
28	Nana Rao Park	Kanpur	Uttar Pradesh	52 Acres	
29	Talkatora Gardens	New Delhi	Delhi	48 Acres	
30	Meghdoot Gardens	Indore	Madhya Pradesh	42 Acres	
31	Rock Garden of Chandigarh	Chandigarh	Chandigarh	40 Acres	
