= New Town Gate =

Arch-monument in Kolkata, India

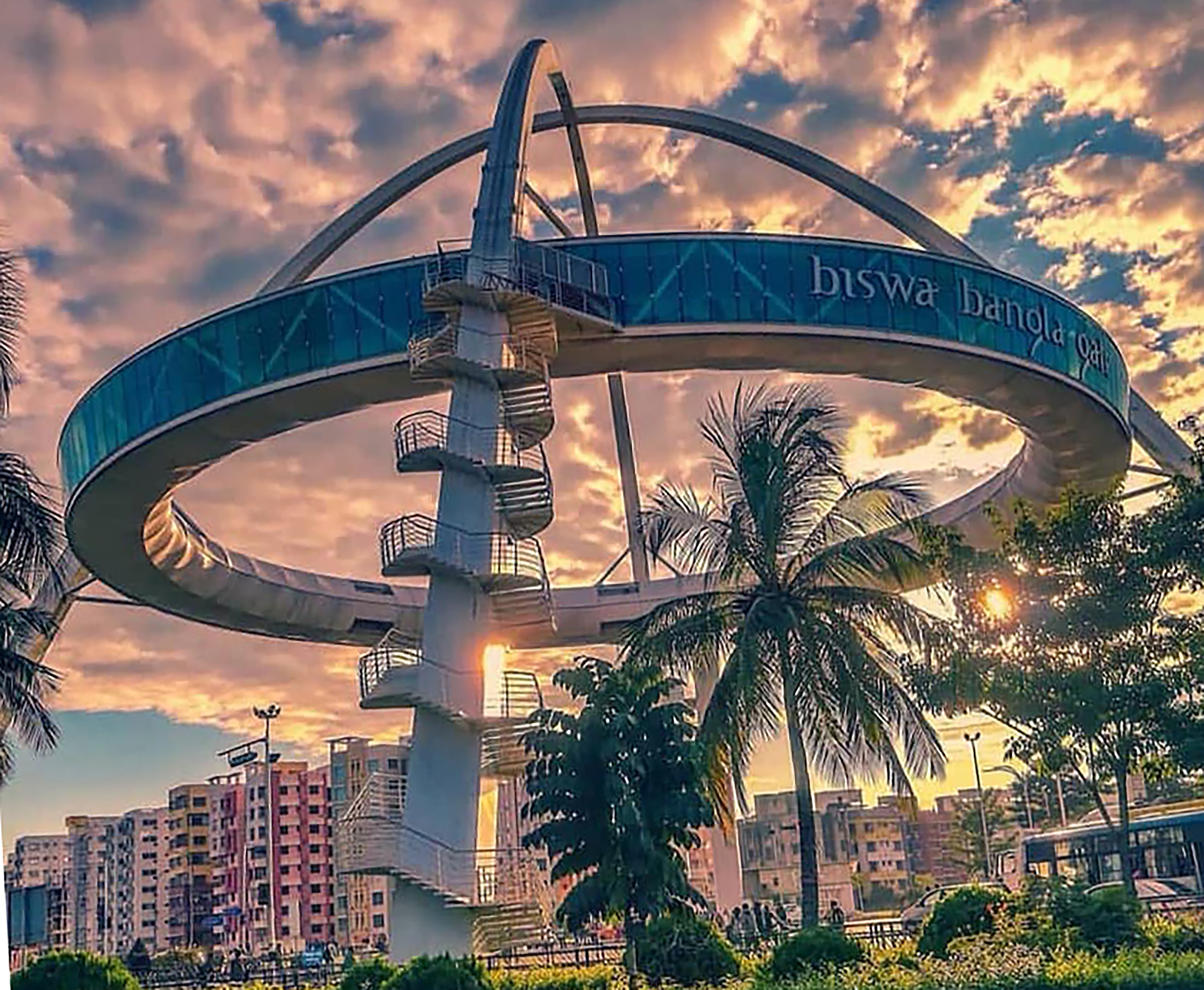
- New Town Gate
- Interactive map of the New Town Gate area
- Former names: Kolkata Gate

General information
- Type: Restaurant
- Architectural style: Retrofuturism
- Location: New Town, Kolkata, West Bengal, India
- Coordinates: 22°34′43″N 88°28′18″E
- Construction started: 6 March 2017
- Completed: 27 January 2018
- Opened: 2 February 2019; 7 years ago
- Owner: Government of West Bengal

Height
- Height: 55 metres (180 feet)

Design and construction
- Architecture firm: Vector Designs
- Main contractor: HIDCO

Other information
- Public transit: Biswa Bangla Convention Centre (Under Construction)

Website
- www.biswabanglagatekolkata.in

New Town Gate (also known as Kolkata Gate) is an arch-monument in the city of New Town, Kolkata, West Bengal, India. It is built by Housing Infrastructure Development Corporation (HIDCO) on the Biswa Bangla Sarani at Narkelbagan, Action Area - I of New Town, Kolkata metropolitan area. It also houses India's first hanging restaurant. The visitors' gallery and restaurant are surrounded by glass giving a show to various parts of New Town.

New Town Gate is located over the third rotary traffic island on Biswa Bangla Sarani, near Rabindra Tirtha in Action Area 1, New Town, Kolkata. It is connected with the Biswa Bangla Convention Centre metro station of Kolkata Metro Orange Line.

== History and construction ==
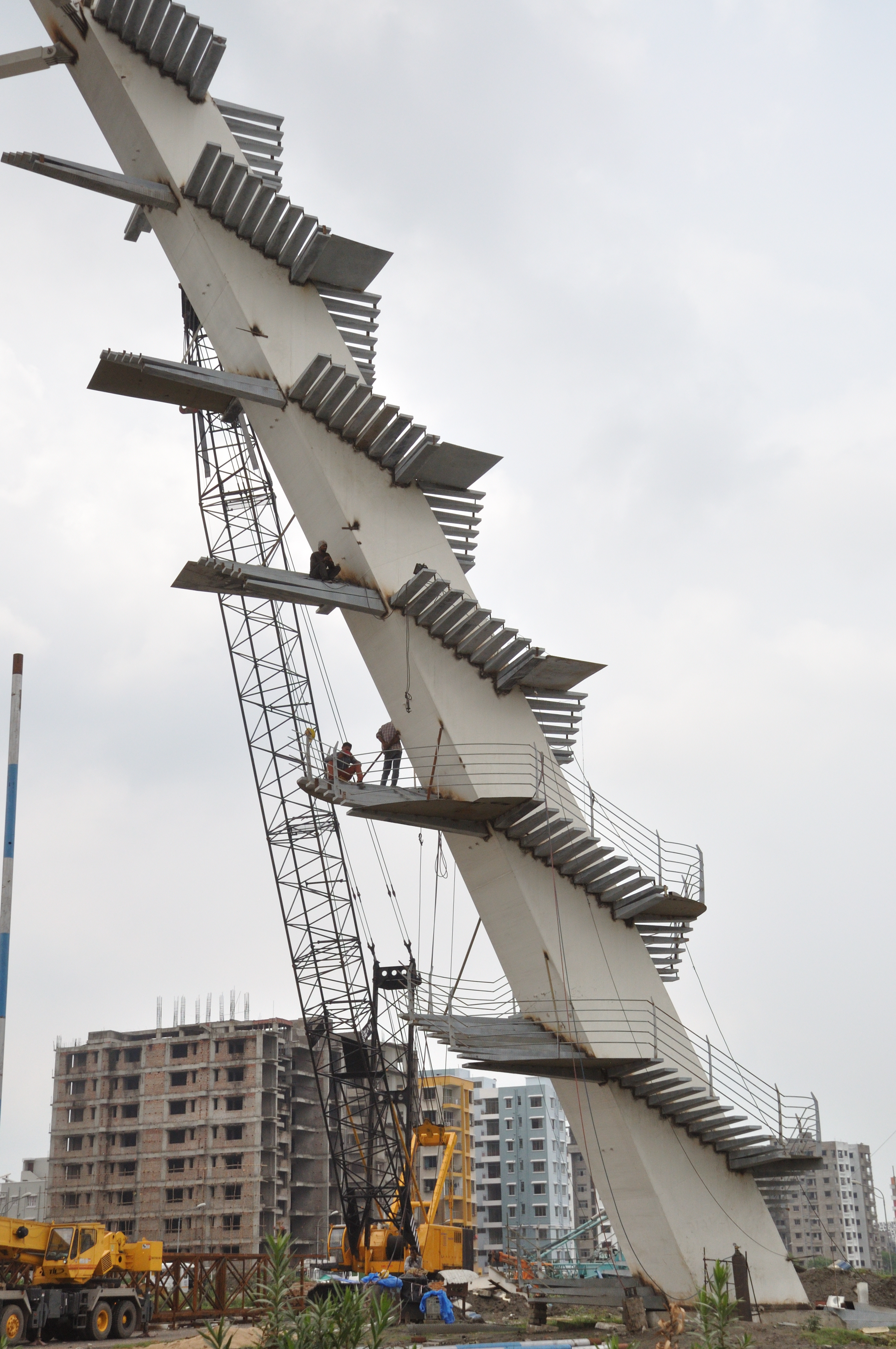

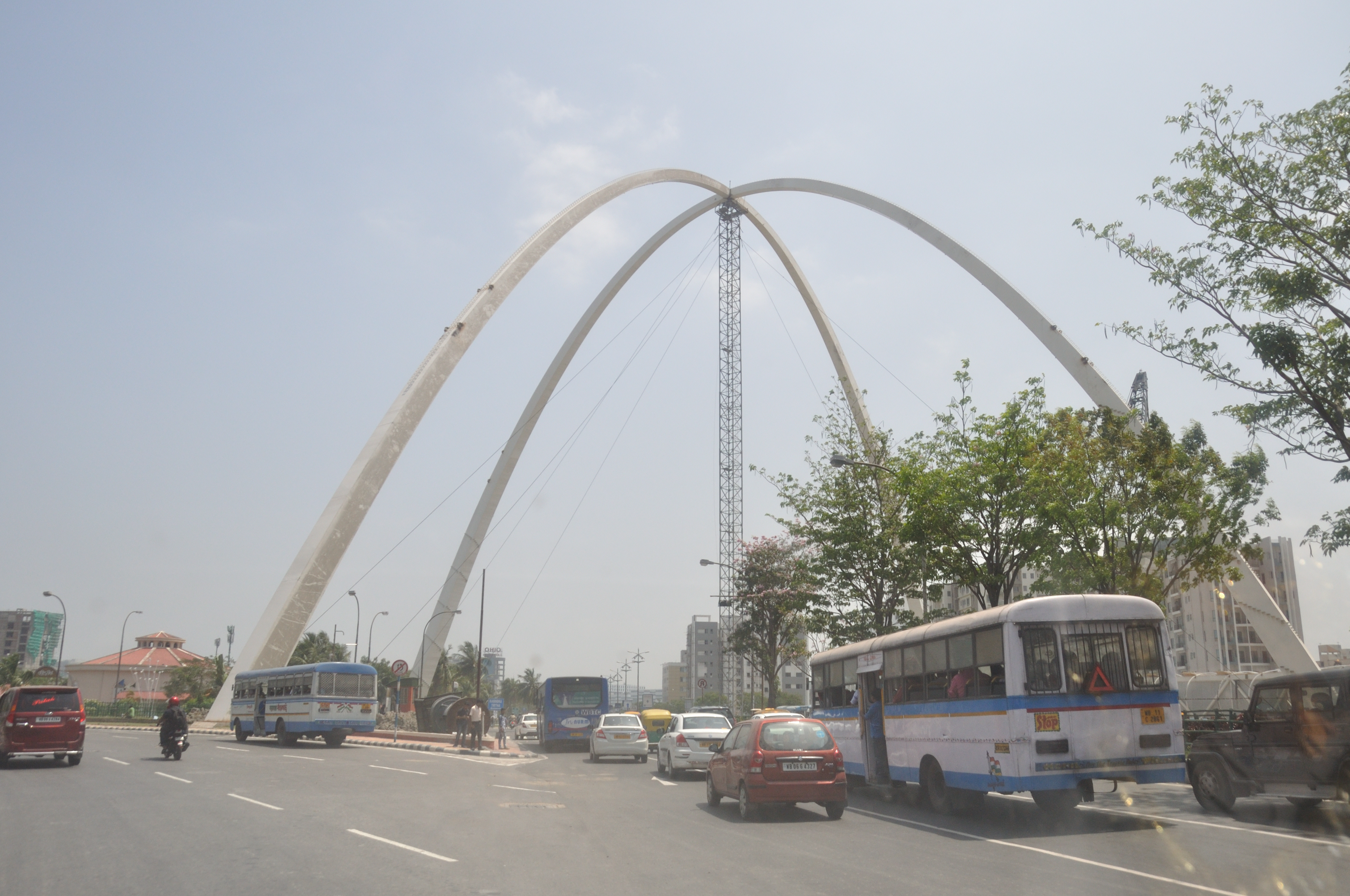
Kolkata Gate under construction in 2017

The idea of Kolkata Gate came up under the Newtown beautification project. design was made public in 2015. The construction of the Gate started on 6 March 2017. The total cost of the construction of the gate was expected to be around ₹25 crore (US$2.6 million).

The initial plan for the structure also included a Biswa Bangla globe (Note: Reference image of Biswa Bangla globe) hanging in the centre of the ring. But, while it was being pulled up, the pulley mechanism faulted and it crashed to the ground. No one was injured and it was decided to scrap the idea of globe.

On 2 February 2019, the gate was opened for public by Chief Minister of West Bengal, Mamata Banerjee.

The ring is supported by two parabolic arches from four sides of the intersection.

== Structure details ==
This gate is 55 metres (180 feet) high. The 60 metres (197 feet) diameter circular viewing gallery is approximately 25 metres (82 feet) above the ground with an overall diameter of 220 metres (722 feet). The ring is supported by two parabolic arches from four corners of the intersection. The four legs stand on concrete foundations 70 tonnes (70,000 kg) steel was used for the structure. There are two staircases and an elevator to reach the gallery. Decorative paintings of luminaries have been drawn on the wall inside the ring with the outer side having a glass façade to have a view of the township. Maximum 100 visitors are allowed at a time on the ring. Biswa Bangla Gate logo is put up on the outer wall of the ring.
