= Kolkata Museum of Modern Art =

Proposed museum in New Town, Kolkata

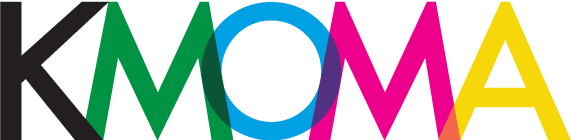

- Location within India
- Alternative names: KMOMA

General information
- Location: New Town, Greater Kolkata, West Bengal, India
- Coordinates: 22.5255°N 88.3665°E
- Governing body: Government of West Bengal

Technical details
- Size: 40,000 square metres (10 acres)

Design and construction
- Architect: Herzog & de Meuron

Website
- kmomamuseum.org/index.html

Kolkata Museum of Modern Art (KMOMA) is a proposed art museum to be built in New Town, Kolkata.

The KMOMA had been estimated to cost about Rs 500 crore and is set to be built on a 40,000-square-metre (10-acre) plot in the nearby township of New Town by the state government, is designed by acclaimed Swiss architects Herzog & de Meuron, who created the Bird's Nest stadium for the Beijing Olympics.

The Chief Minister of West Bengal Mamata Banerjee had laid the foundation stone for this project in November 2013.

== Location ==
The KMOMA is located along the Major Arterial Road (part of Biswa Bangla Sarani) in Action Area - II of New Town at 22°35′55″N 88°28′03″E. The park will be surrounded by Akankha on the north, the New Town Eco Park and Kolkata International Convention Center on the south, the upcoming Central Business District and International Financial Hub on the east, and existing human settlement of Jatragachi/Hatiara on the west and south-west.

== See also ==
- Indian Museum
- HIDCO
- List of museums in India
- List of museums in West Bengal
- Museum of Modern Art
- The Last Harvest : Paintings of Rabindranath Tagore
