= Eco Park metro station (Kolkata) =

Metro station in Kolkata, India

Eco Park

General information
- Location: Action Area IIE, Reckjoani; New Town, West Bengal 700135; India
- Coordinates: 22.611191°N 88.467231°E
- System: Kolkata Metro
- Operator: Metro Railway, Kolkata
- Line: Orange Line
- Platforms: 2 (2 side platforms)

Construction
- Structure type: Elevated
- Accessible: Yes

History
- Opening: 2026 (expected)
- Former names: Convention Centre
Route map
Location

Eco Park is a metro station of Orange Line of the Kolkata Metro. It is situated beside Eco Park and will serve the Nawabpur area of New Town.

== Location ==
This station is located beside Eco Park in the Nawabpur area of New Town. The main elevated structure of the station stands in the middle of Biswa Bangla Sarani, with foot-over-bridges on either side of the road.

== History ==
This project was sanctioned in the budget of 2010–11 by Mamata Banerjee with a project deadline of six years. The execution of this project has been entrusted to RVNL at a cost of Rs 3951.98 crore. It will help to reduce travel time between the southern fringes of Kolkata to Netaji Subhas Chandra Bose International Airport. When IL&FS, which had been awarded the contract, abandoned the project in 2018, work for Convention Centre (Eco Park) had stopped. However, the construction resumed in 2020 under ITD-Cementation. In 2021, nine metro stations were renamed by the Government of West Bengal, including Convention Centre, which became Eco Park.

== Station ==
=== Structure ===
Eco Park Metro Station is an elevated metro station. Once completed, there will be two 180-metre-long platforms at Eco Park station along with ticket counters, Automatic Smart Card Recharge Machines (ASCRM) for a self-ticketing facility.

Along with staircases, lifts and escalators will also be provided at this station. Apart from these, separate toilets for ladies, gents, and divyangjan will be available for the convenience of passengers.

Public Address System, digital display boards, emergency lighting facility for the convenience of the passengers, tactile floor indicators for the blind will be some other added amenities here.

=== layout ===
L2	Side platform, Doors will open on the left
L2	Platform 1	Train towards Jai Hind (Mangaldeep) →
L2	Platform 2	← Train towards Kavi Subhash (Mother's Wax Museum)
L2	Side platform, Doors will open on the left
L1	Concourse	Fare control, station agent, Metro QR ticket vending machines, crossover
G	Street level	Exit/Entrance

== Power and signal systems ==
Like other stations and lines of Kolkata Metro, this station has 750 volt DC powered third rail. The electricity system will be used to operate the train.

Train movement at this station will be managed by communication based train control signaling system. With this signal system, trains can be operated at intervals of 90 seconds.

== Services ==
Services have not started from this station. Currently the station is under construction.

== See also ==
- List of Kolkata Metro stations
