= Nazrul Tirtha =

Cultural and educational centre in Kolkata, India

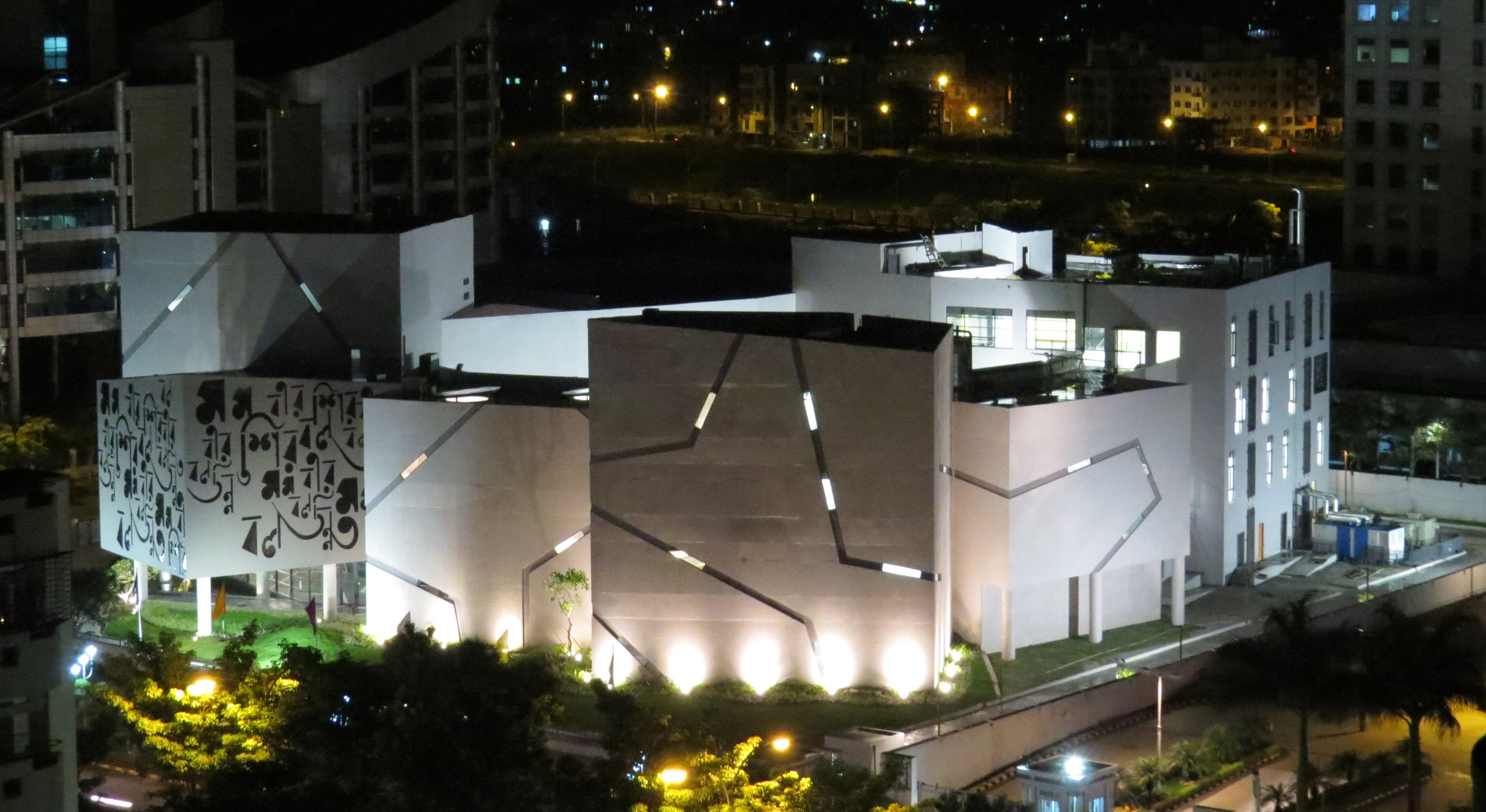
- Interactive map of the Nazrul Tirtha area

General information
- Type: Museum and academic research centre
- Architectural style: Modern / Bengali
- Location: Beside DLF 1, New Town, Greater Kolkata, West Bengal, India
- Completed: 2013-14

Design and construction
- Architect: Abin Chaudhuri

Nazrul Tirtha (Nazrul Pilgrimage) is a cultural and educational center dedicated to the Bengali poet Kazi Nazrul Islam. The center is situated in Action Area - I of New Town, Kolkata. It is only 2.5 kilometers from Rabindra Tirtha. West Bengal Chief Minister Mamata Banerjee inaugurated the center on 24 May 2014 to mark the 115th birth anniversary of the poet.

From August 2015, the center started screening films and in November 2015 became a venue for the Kolkata International Film Festival. Nazrul Tirtha also hosts art exhibitions.

== Architecture and design ==
The design and architecture of the center is said to be unique in Kolkata and bears the signature material of controversial Swiss-born French architect Le Corbusier. The architectural language has been developed to express the personality of Kazi Nazrul Islam, designed by architect Abin Chaudhuri. An introverted mass was designed around a central green Courtyard which provides diffused natural light to the interiors. Considering the nature of the functions within, it was important to restrict the exposure to direct sunlight. The use of thin exterior RC walls saved energy, cost and time. The use of concrete provided the opportunity to explore innovative ways of treating the building. An indigenous sculptural feature wall was devised with inscribed famous words of the poet. The main gate has an 8.5 m high block of concrete sitting atop stilts, another Corbusian influence. On it are embedded the words Unnata mama shir, from Nazrul's poem Bidrohi. Of the seven blocks, three would house the museum, one block a library and another an auditorium.

At present, the cultural centre is functioning partly as a cinema hall and open air theatre for exhibitions and performances.

== Gallery ==
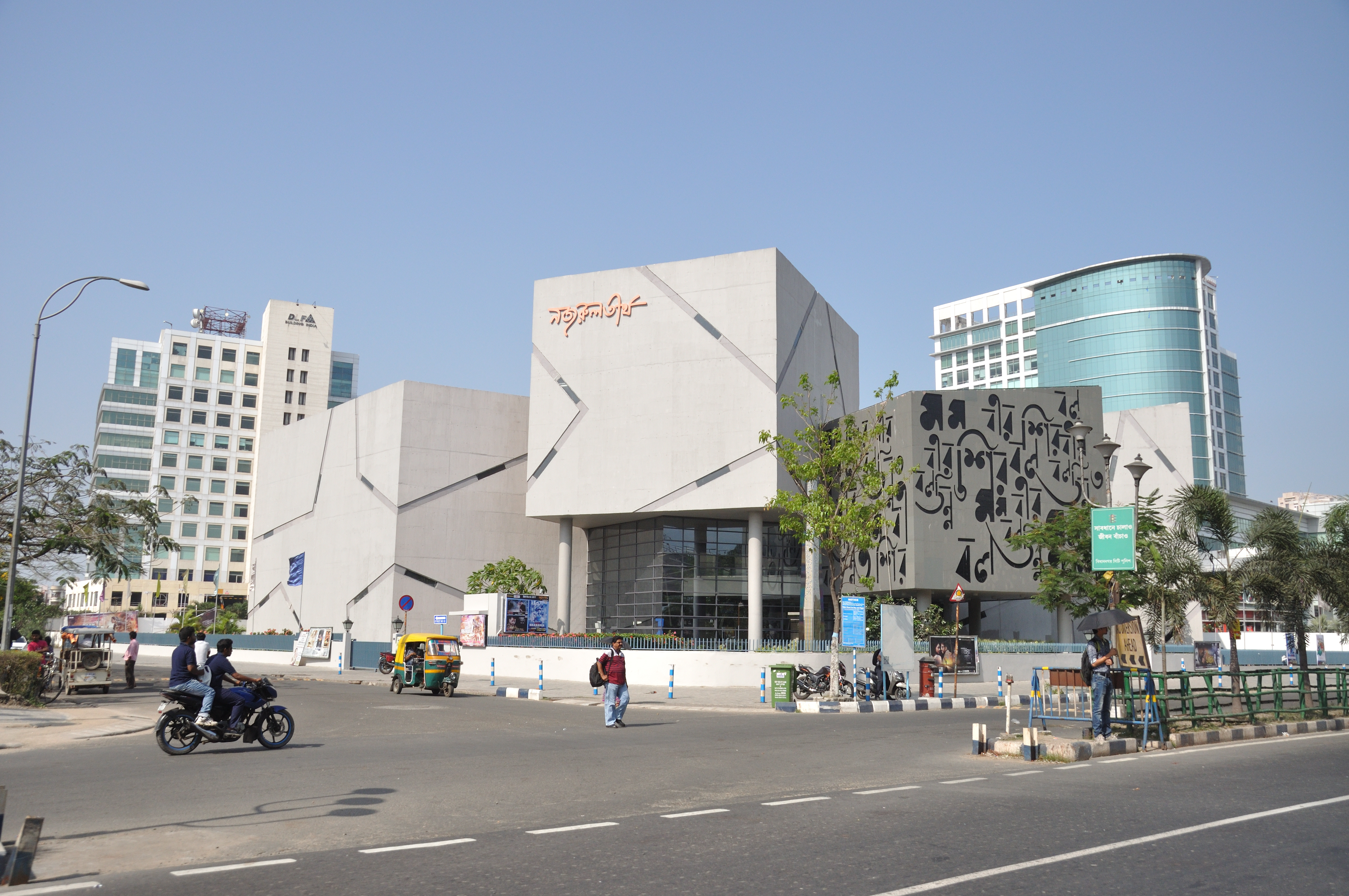
As seen from Major Arterial Road

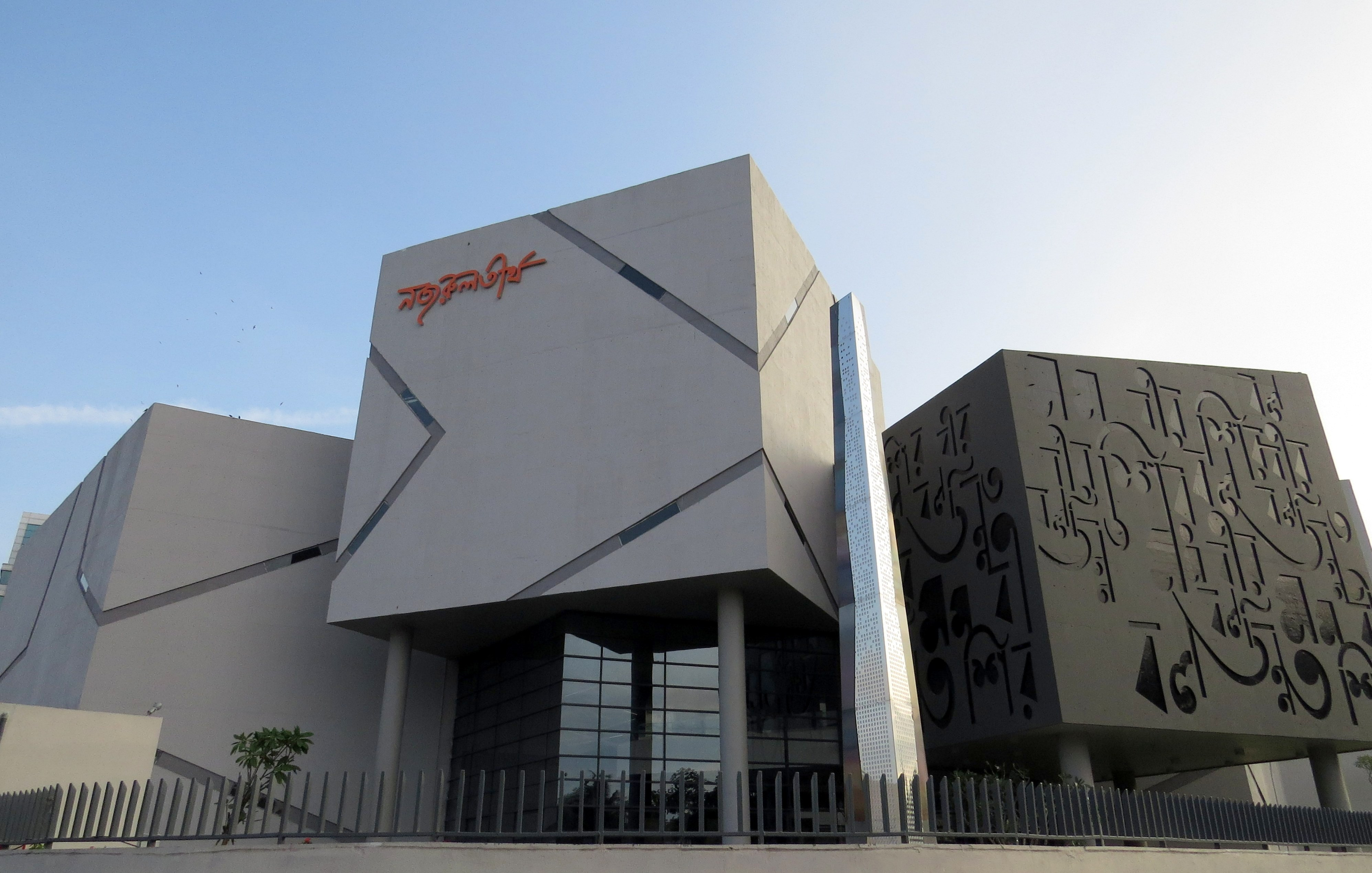
Up front

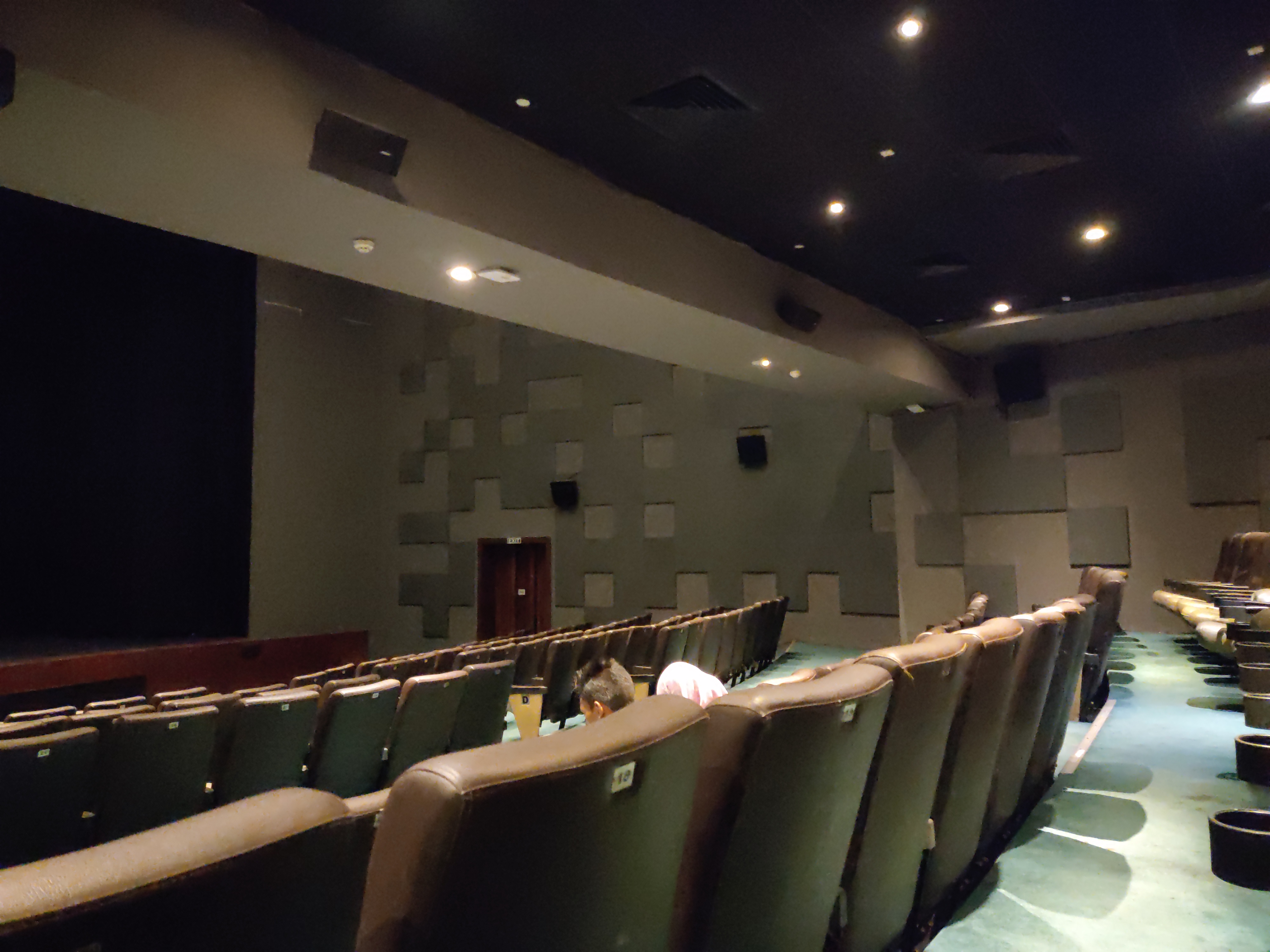
Screen 1 interiors

== See also ==
- HIDCO
- Rabindra Tirtha
