= Eco Park, New Town =

Urban park in Rajarhat, Kolkata, India

Eco Park
- প্রকৃতি তীর্থ
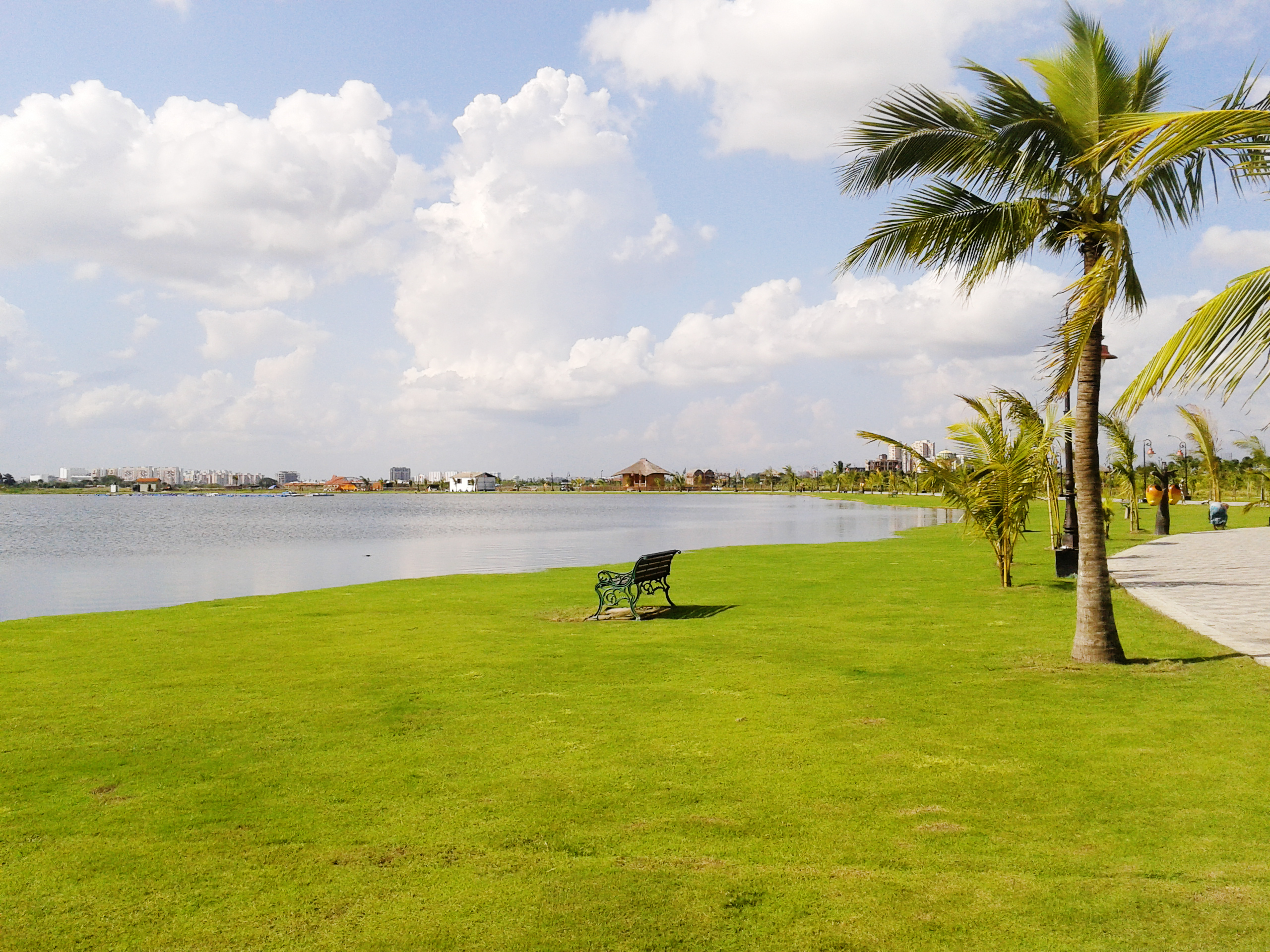
- Lush green grass along the lake at Eco Park
- Interactive map of Eco Park
- Type: Urban Park
- Location: New Town, Greater Kolkata
- Coordinates: 22°35′56″N 88°28′01″E
- Area: 190 hectares (480 acres)
- Opened: 29 December 2012; 13 years ago
- Founder: Mamata Banerjee
- Designer: 1. Pradeep Sachdeva Design Associates (PSDA); 2. Bengal Urban Infrastructure Development Limited (BUIDL)
- Operator: WBHIDCO
- Open: Monday: Closed; Tuesday to Sunday: 11:30 A.M. to 08:30 P.M.
- Parking: 2 lots, 350 total vehicles
- Public transit: Orange Line: Eco Park metro station; Mother's Wax Museum metro station
- Website: Eco Park

Eco Park (প্রকৃতি তীর্থ) is an urban park in New Town, Kolkata, India. With an area of 190 hectares (480 acres), including a 42 hectares (104 acres) waterbody, Eco Park is the largest urban park in India. The park was conceptualised by Mamata Banerjee, the CM of West Bengal, in July 2011. It is constructed under the oversight of WBHIDCO, along with different other government bodies responsible for implementation of different works inside the park. Eco Park offers diverse attractions, including theme gardens and recreational activities, making it a prime spot for eco-friendly tourism in Kolkata.

The park has been divided into three broad parts; 1) ecological zones like wetlands, grasslands, and urban forest, 2) theme gardens and open spaces, 3) and urban recreational spaces. The Eco Park is further divided into different sub-parts according to the different types of fauna planted. The copies of the Seven Wonders of the World have also been made for people to visit in this park. According to the plan, the park will have different areas like wild flower meadows, a bamboo garden, grasslands, tropical tree garden, bonsai garden*, tea garden, Cactus Walk*, a heliconia garden*, a butterfly garden, a play area and an amphitheatre(*-yet to be added). Further, there is plan to develop an eco-resort in public-private partnership, and will also include an area where handicrafts from different part of the state will be exhibited. The park was inaugurated on 29 December 2012 by Mamata Banerjee. Etc.

== Location ==
The Eco park is located along the Major Arterial Road (part of Biswa Bangla Sarani) in Action Area - II of New Town at 22°35′55″N 88°28′03″E, 10 km away from Kolkata International Airport. The park is surrounded by the Kolkata Museum of Modern Art on the North, the upcoming Central Business District and International Financial Hub on the east, the Kolkata International Convention Center, HIDCO Bhawan and Rabindra Tirtha on the south and existing human settlement of Jatragachi/Hatiara on the West. It is well connected with VIP Road and EM Bypass. Buses are available from Ultadanga, Baguiati, Kolkata Airport, Salt Lake and Chingrighata.

== Places of interests and activities ==
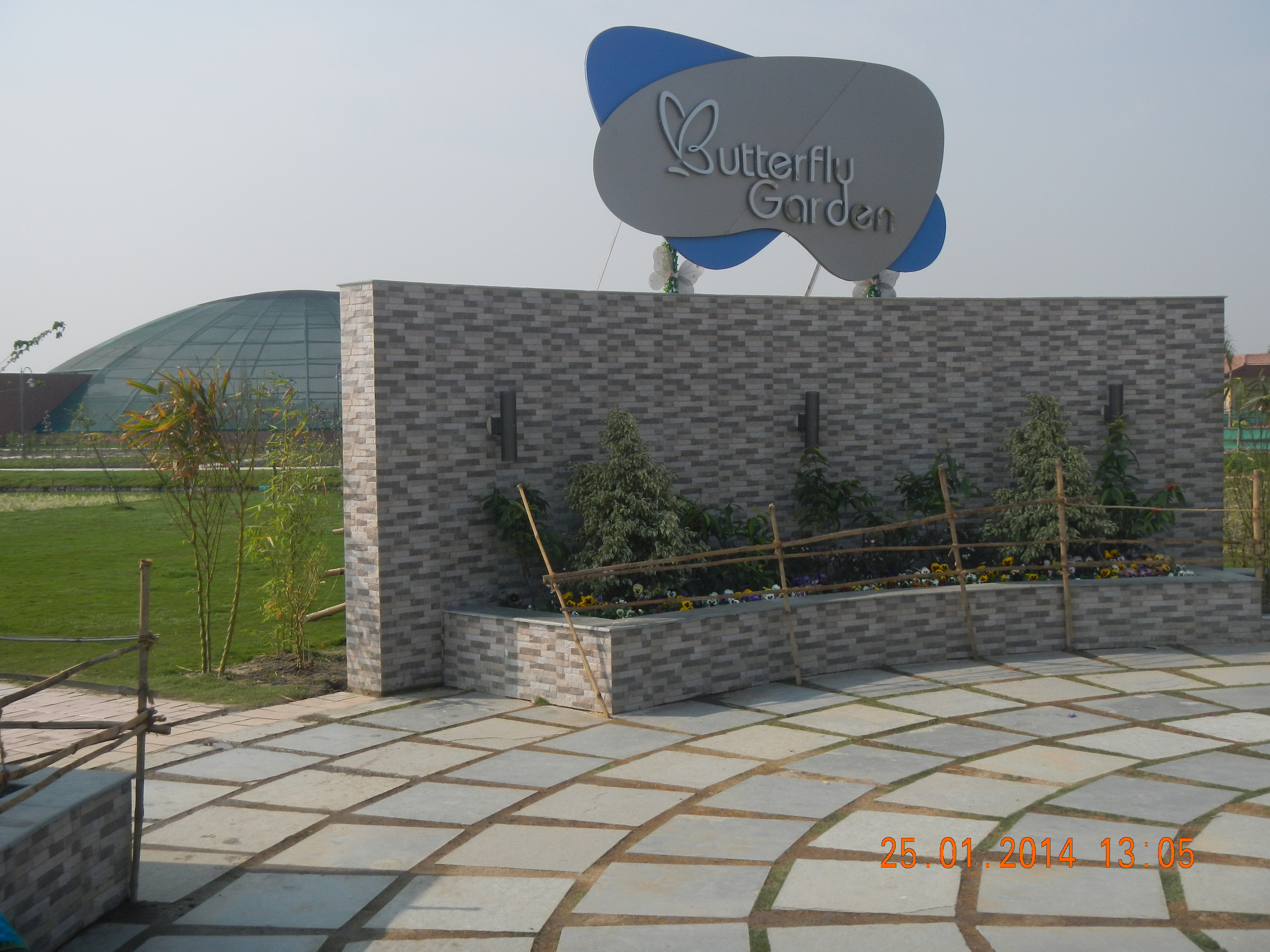
Entrance of the Butterfly Garden

According to the masterplan made by Bengal Urban Infrastructure Development Limited, the park has been divided into the following areas:

- Active Zone - Consisting of Visitor center, Restaurants, Food courts, Urban Museum, Crafts Haat, Seven Wonders
- Theme Area (North) - Consisting of Maidan (open field), Amphitheatre, children's play area, Chinese garden, formal garden, Bonsai garden, Cactus walk, Butterfly garden, heliconia garden and mist house and bamboo garden
- Theme Area (South) - Play area, tea plantation, Water garden and utility area
- Lake Zone - A bridge connecting the island, Bengali restaurant, Sculpture court, Lakefront Promenade, Wildflower meadows
- 3 different Eco-zones consisting of wetlands, grasslands, tropical and mixed-moist deciduous forests.

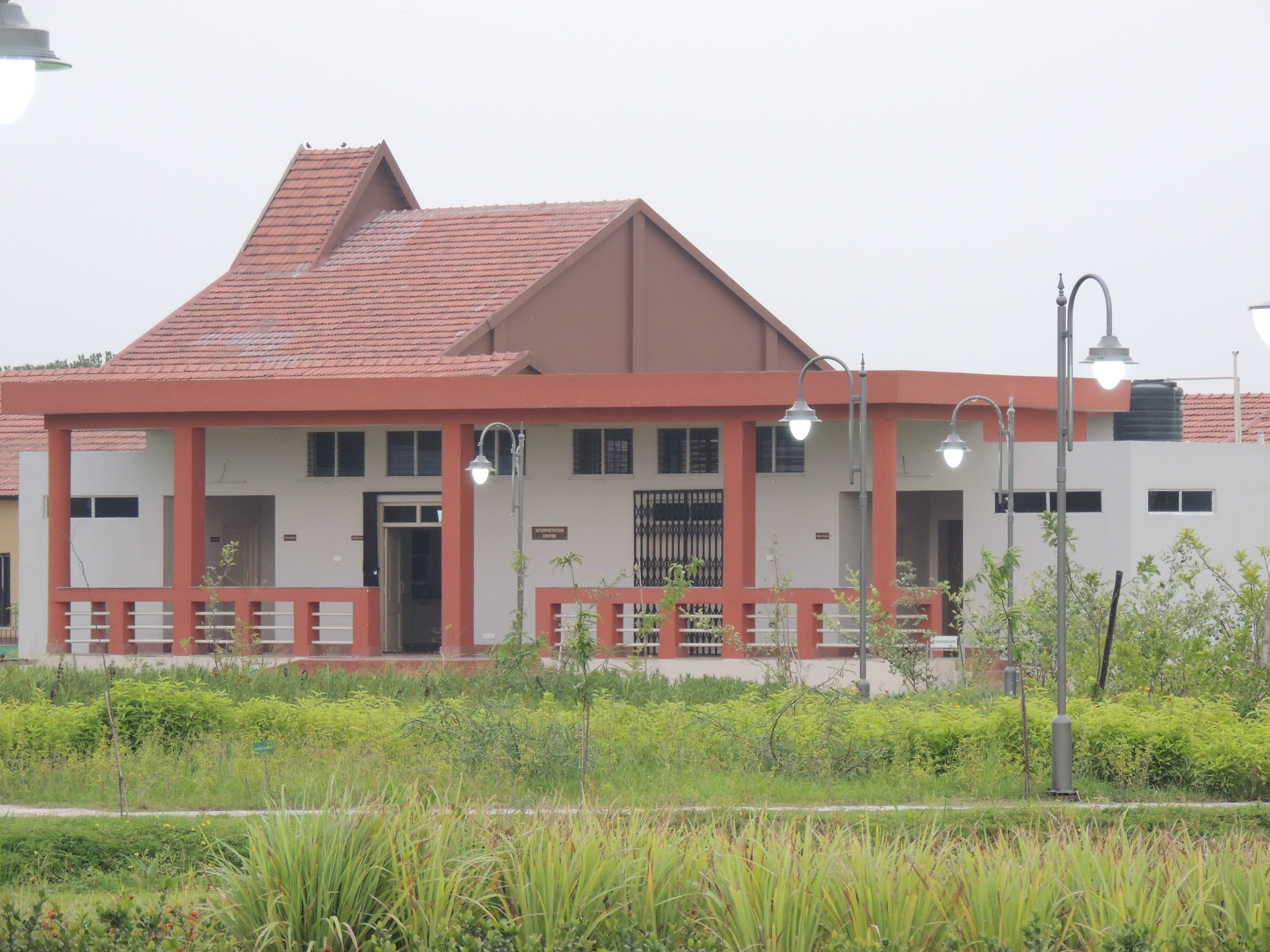
Butterfly Lab

=== Places of interest ===
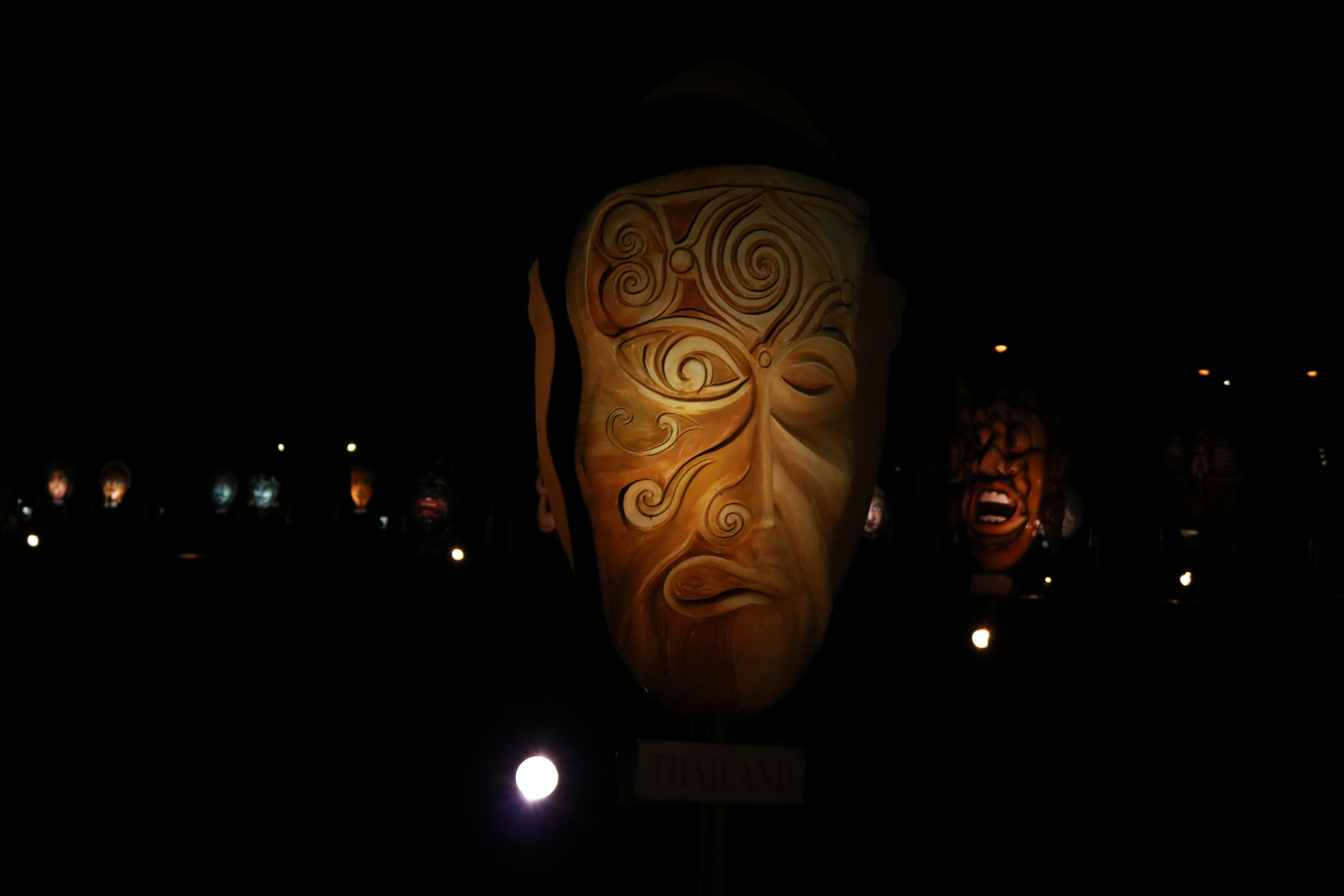
Thailand Mask at Mask Garden ...

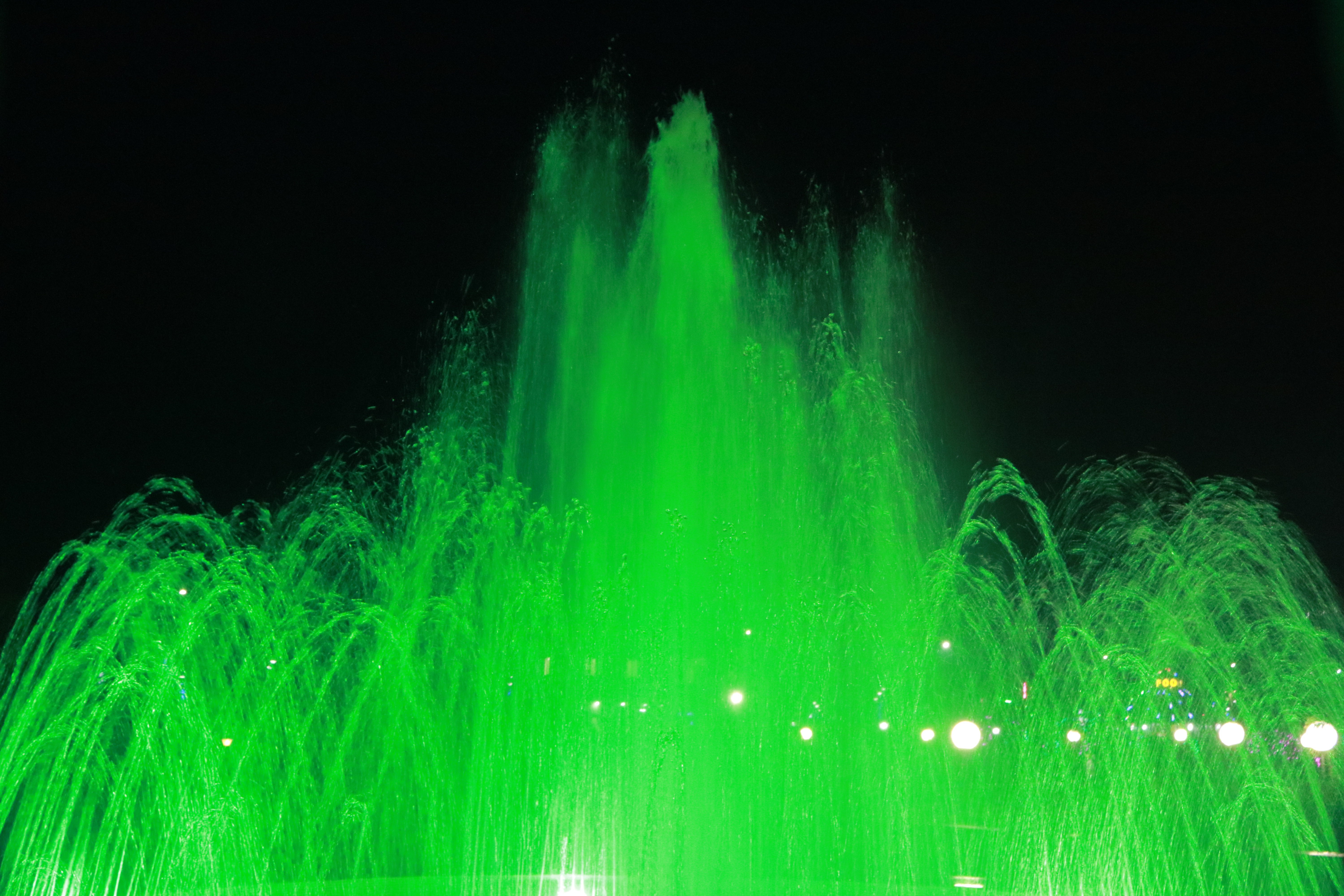
Musical Fountain at Eco Park ...

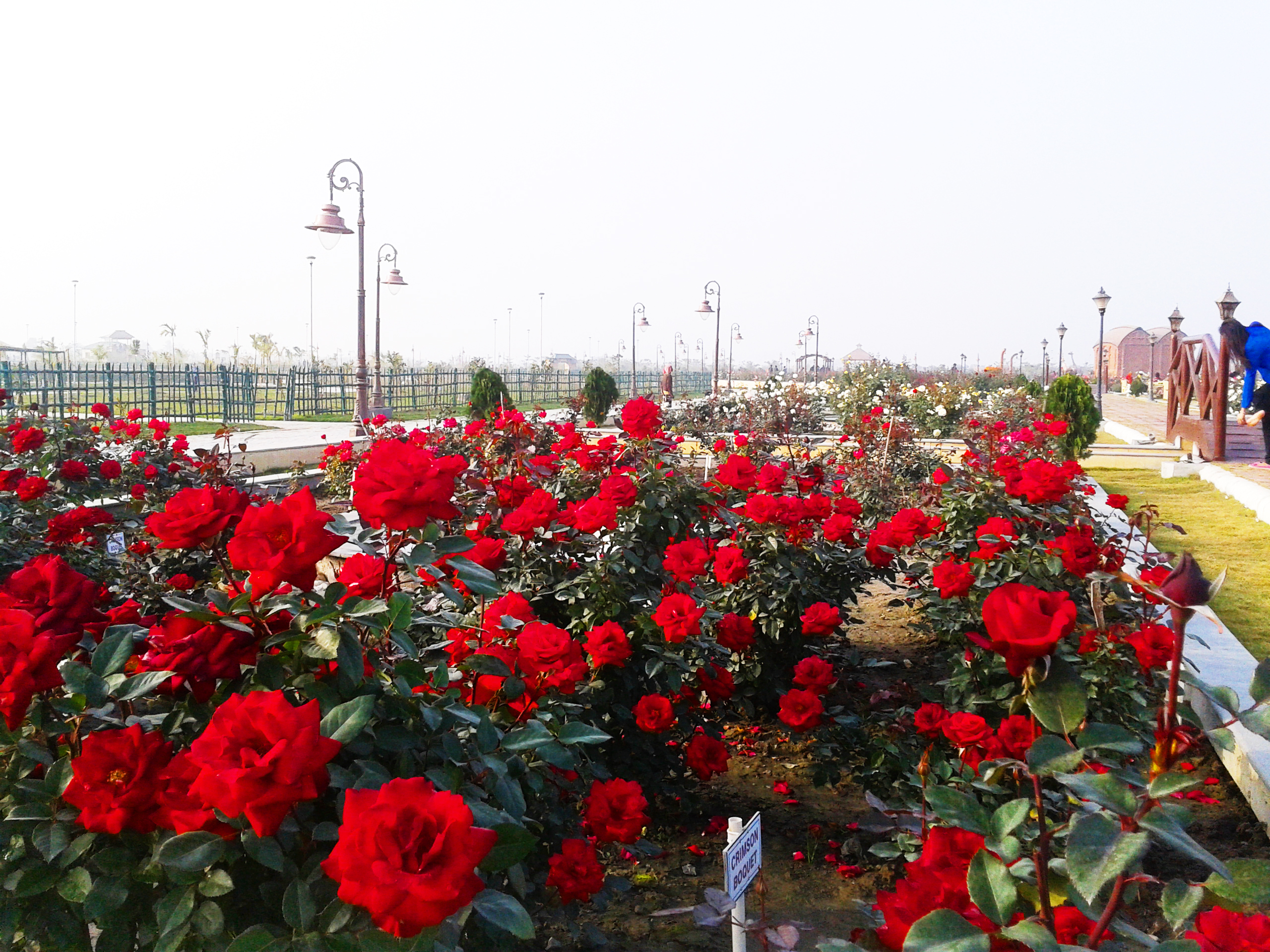
Roses blooming in the rose garden during winter

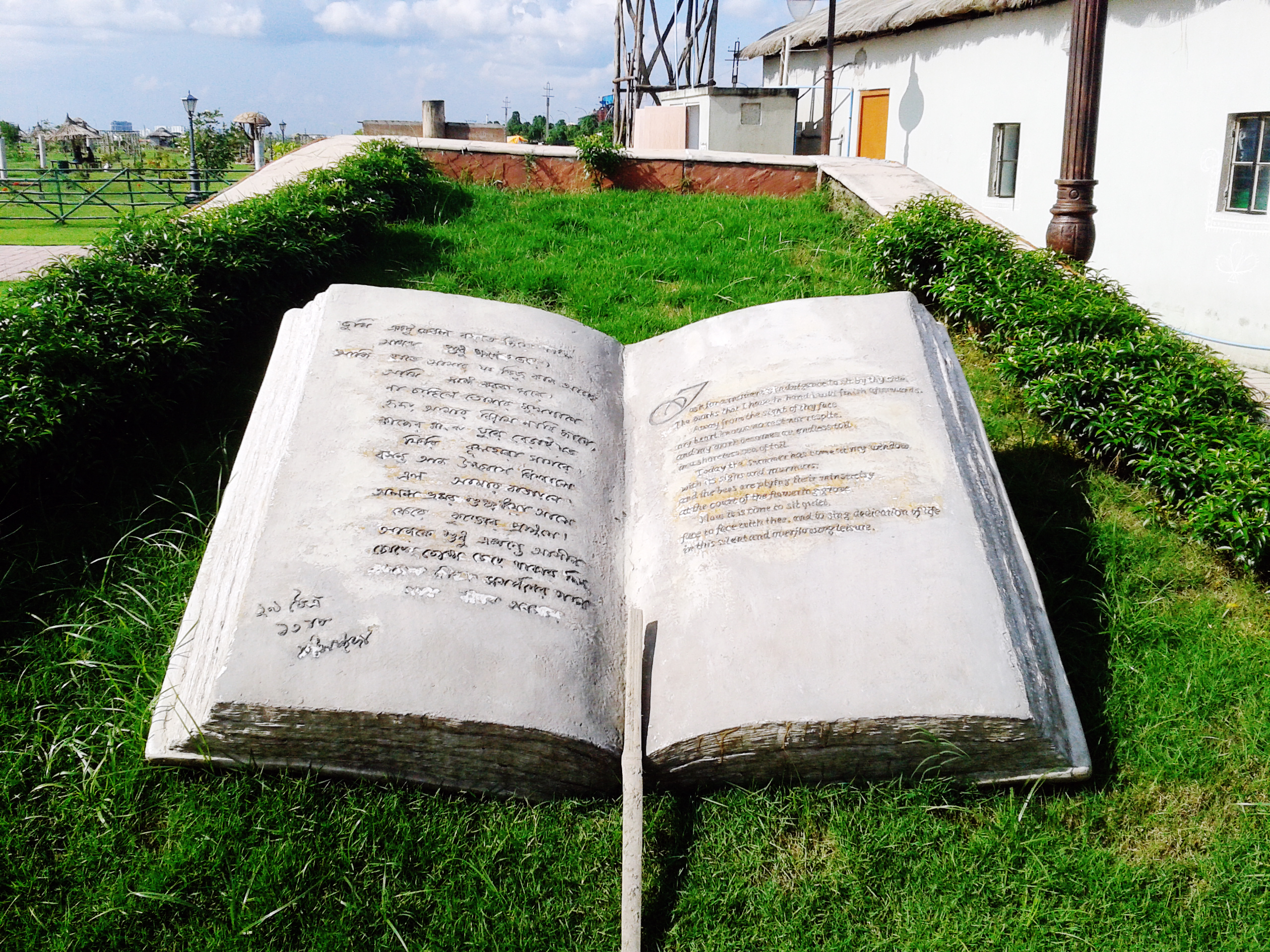
Model of a book showing one of Tagore's poems in Bengali

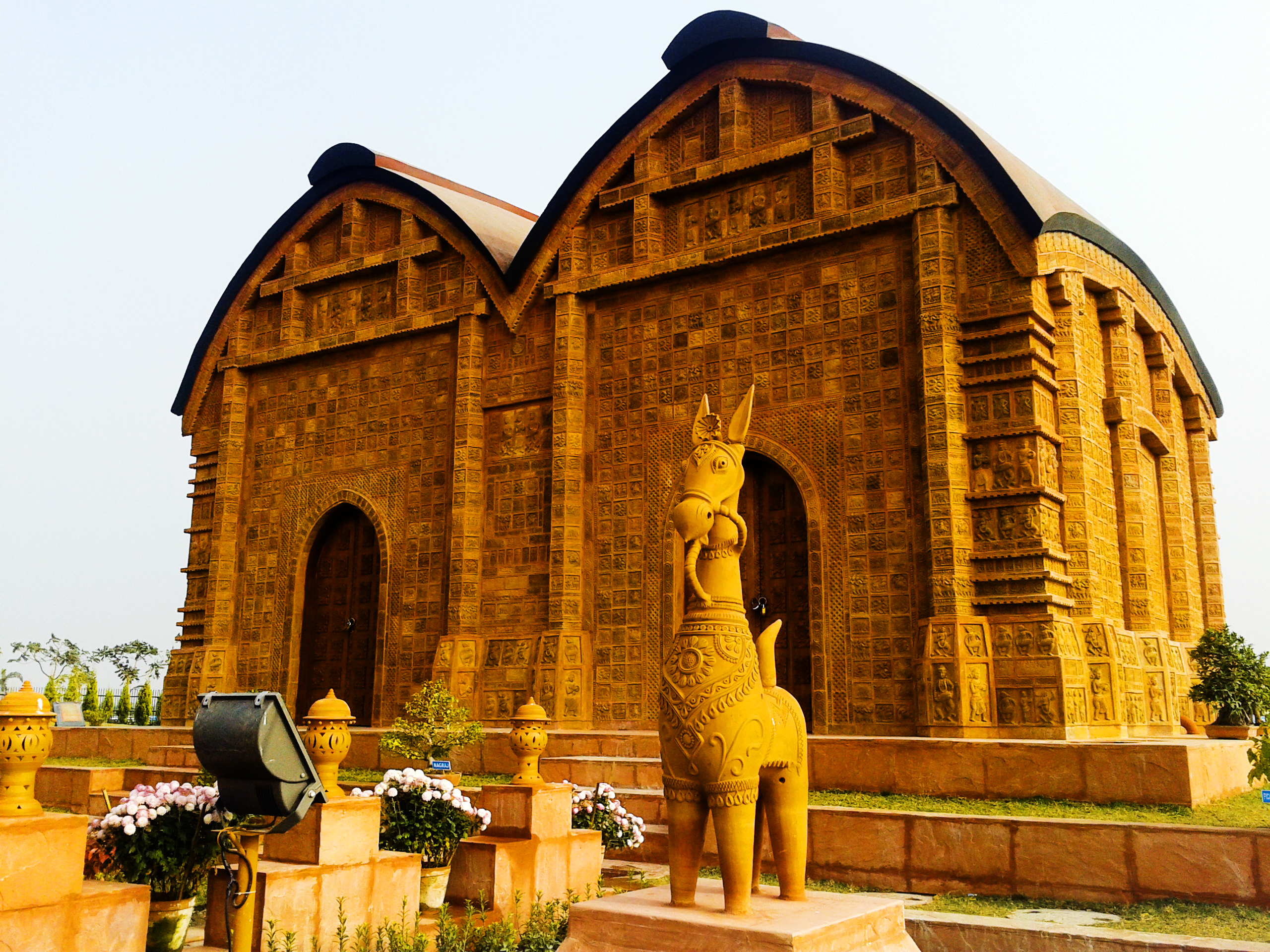
Replica of a temple from Bishnupur at the Eco Park

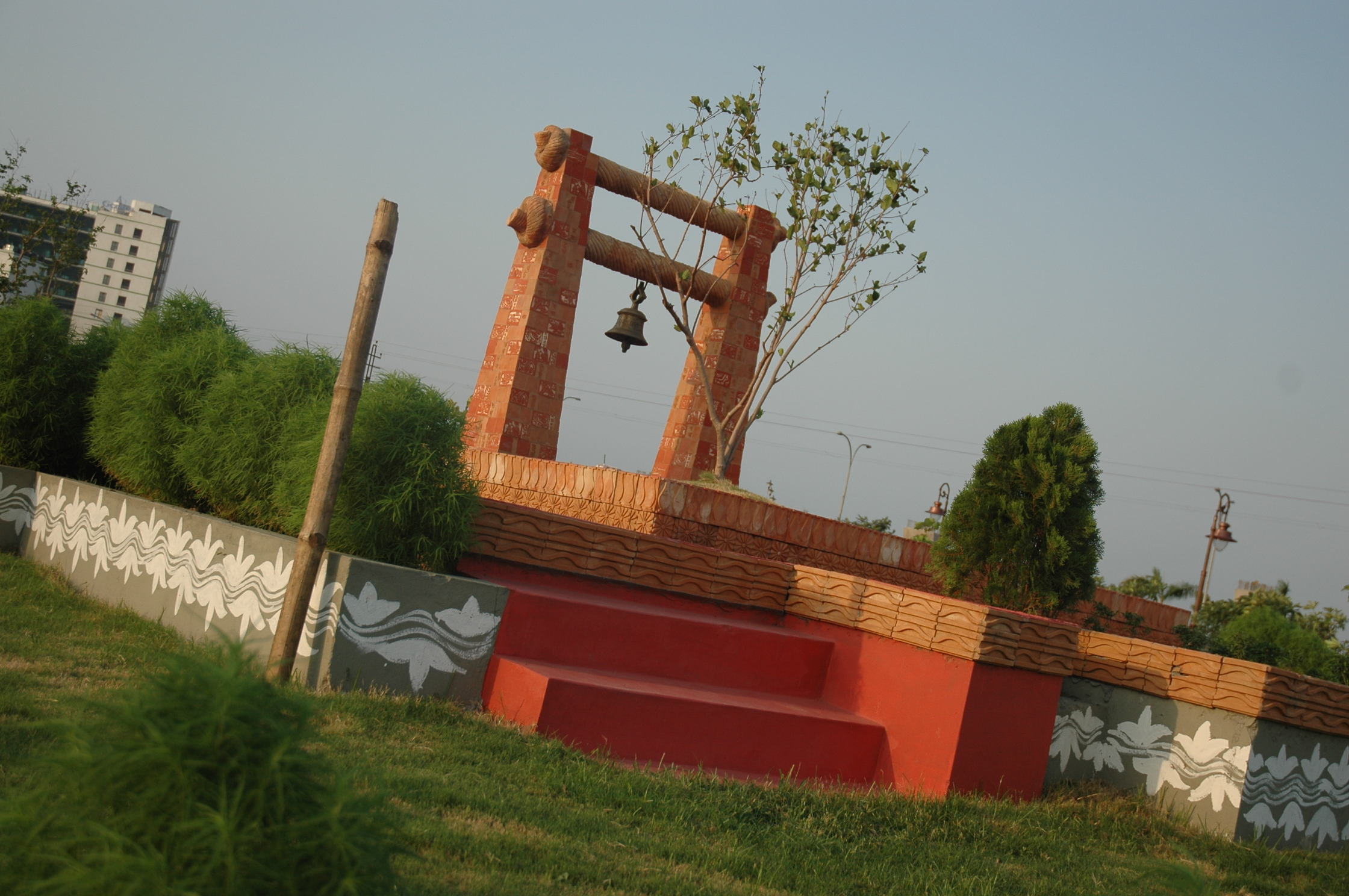
An exact replica of the Bell at the Visva Bharati University, Shantiniketan

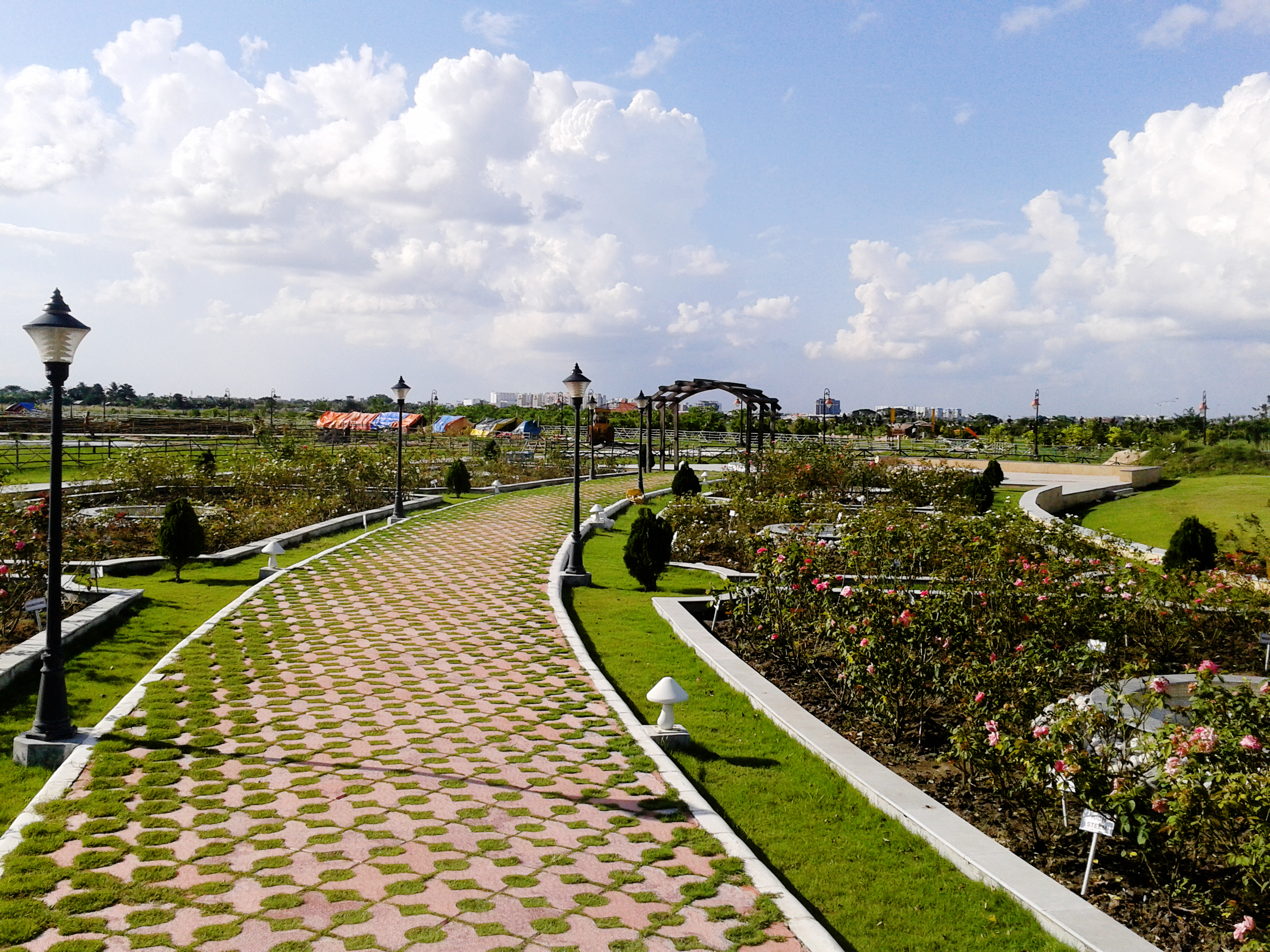
Walkway through the rose garden

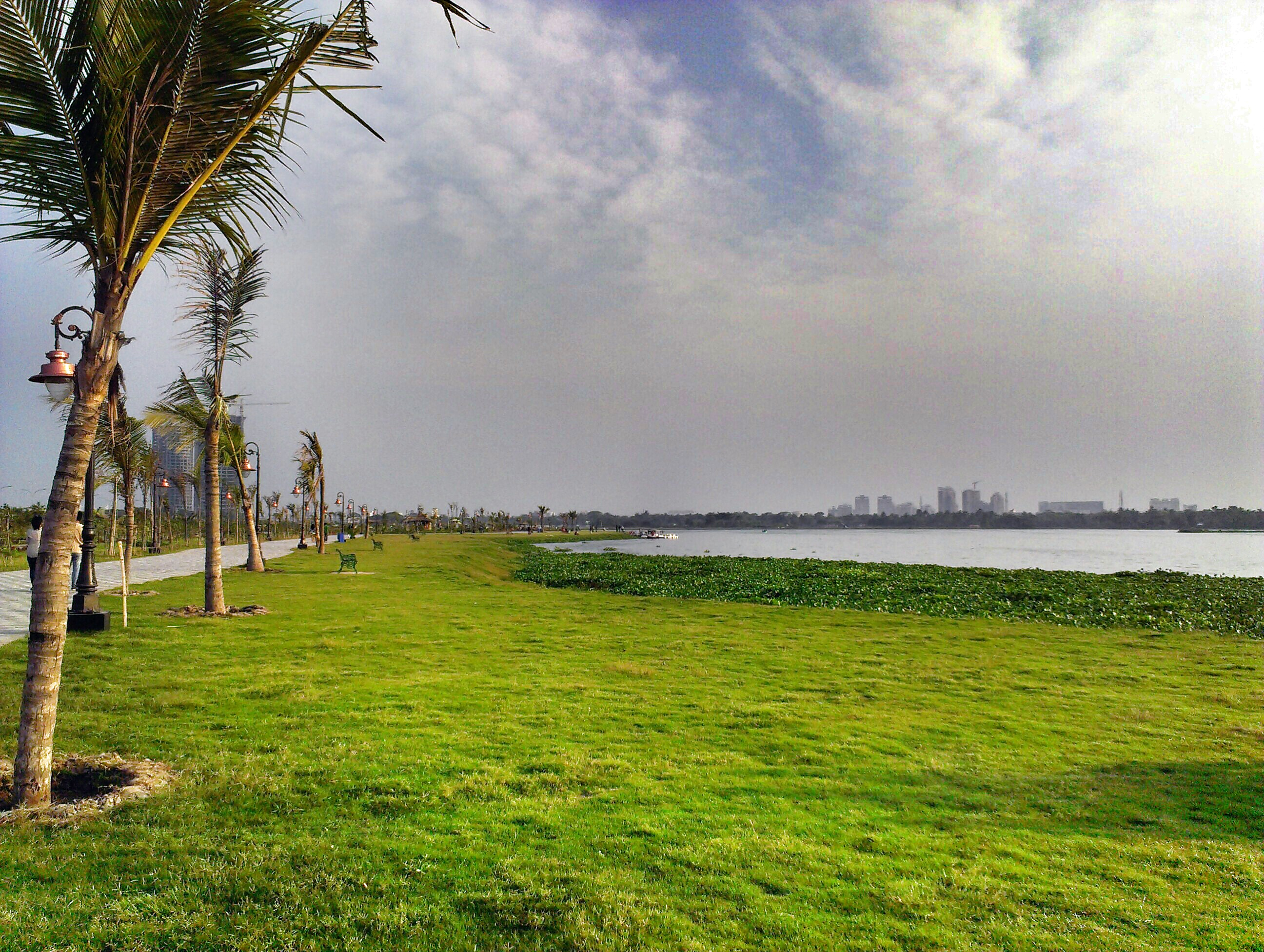
Waterbody at Eco Park

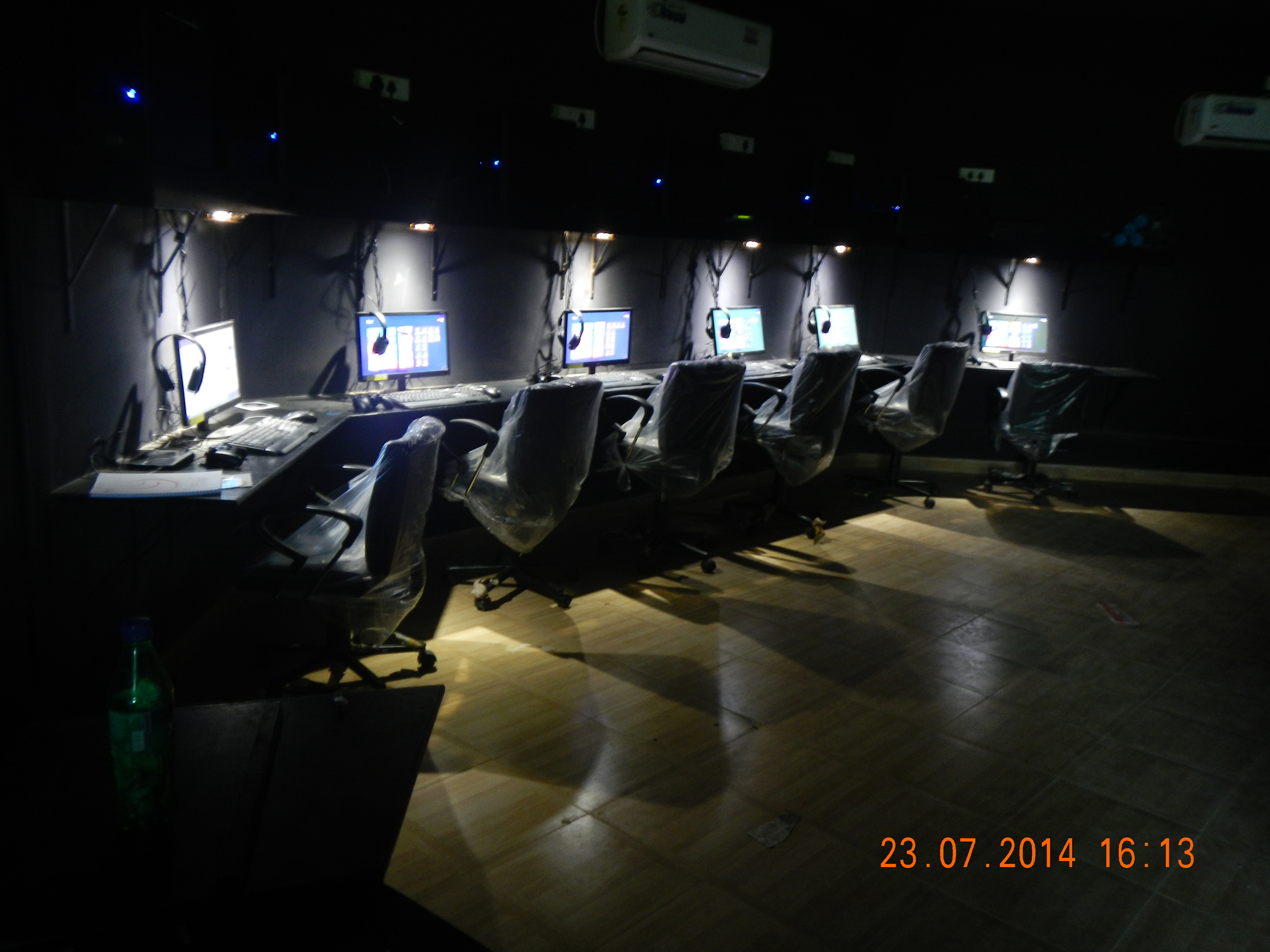
Gaming_Zone

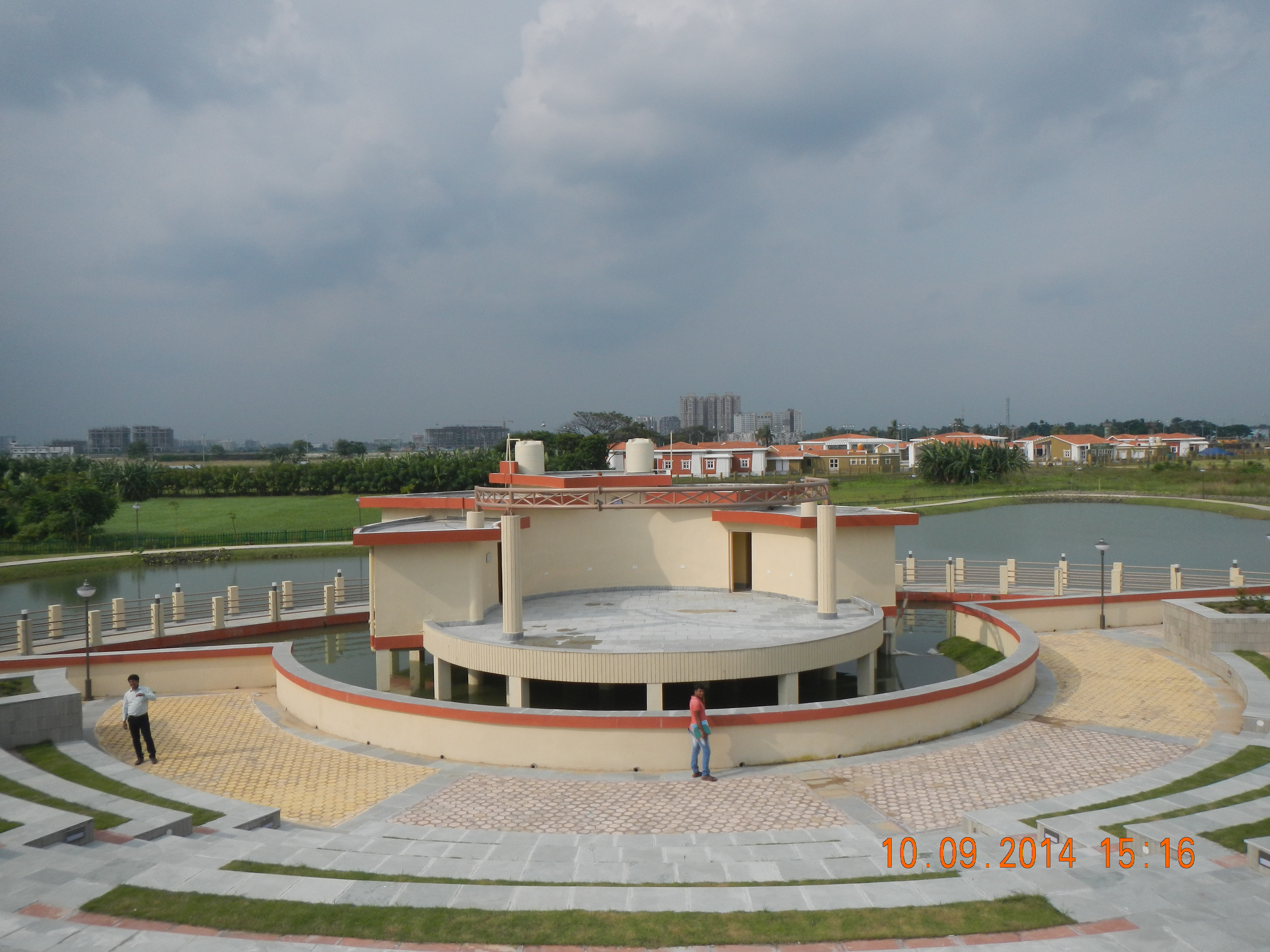
Amphitheatre

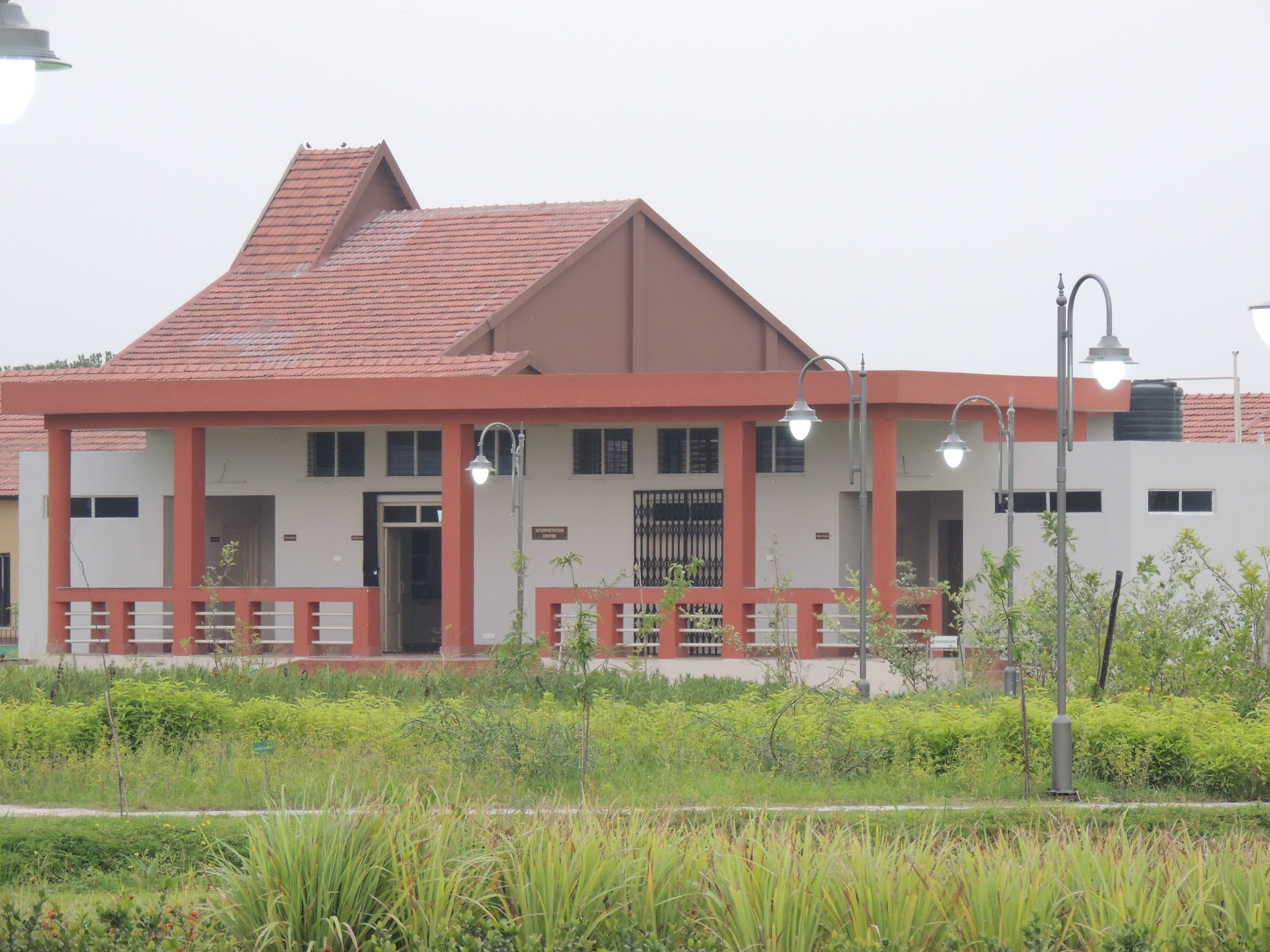
Butterfly Lab

Thematic Areas	Details
Glass House on Sabuj Sathi	"Sabuj Sathi" is the name of an Island. This island is in centre of the huge lake of Eco Park. Its area is 2.8 hectares (7 acres). It can be accessed only by boat. This is an uninhabited island. On this Sabuj Sathi Island a glass house has been built. All four sides of this 260 square metres (2,800 ft^{2}) building is made of glass. The 360° view of the Eco Park across the lake through the glass walls is extensive. There are three open-air viewing galleries, green lawn and paved pathways in the island. More than 100 persons can assemble in Sabuj Sathi Island and glass house and its surroundings for official, corporate or family programmes. Wedding / Birthday parties, product launches and brand promotion can be done in a tranquil environment that is possible only on the zero populated island like Sabuj Sathi in Eco Park.
Amphitheatre	Artfully conceived, the semi-circular open gallery can hold up to 2,000 people. The stage-greenroom complex is, as if, 'floating' on water. The adjoining food gallery has interesting brick-twisted pillars that I have not seen elsewhere. The whole construction has been done by KMDA. The amphitheatre was inaugurated by Minister Firhad Hakim on 22 September 2014 at 5 pm.
Lake Front Promenade	Spine of the Eco Park, the Promenade is a paved, coconut-tree lined pathway designed for the visitors to enjoy the 45-hectare (112-acre) water body that defines the Park.
Seven Wonders Replica	Egyptian Pyramids of Giza, Brazil's Christ the Redeemer, Great Wall of China, India's Taj Mahal, Great Sphinx of Giza, Petra in Jordan, Eiffel Tower in France, Colosseum of Rome in Italy, Moai Statues of Easter Island.
Rabi Aranya	With reference to the spirit and ambience of Santinikean Ashram, Rabi Aranyafeatures trees and plants mentioned by Tagore in his literary works. Other elements of the garden include, among others, a commemorative pavilion, walkways, seating area, lotus pond, etc.
Tropical Tree Garden	As the name suggests, this zone caters specifically to tropical trees. Even with the recently planted trees, one can get the aura of a tropical forest, especially a Bengal one, in the middle of New Town.
Wild Flower Meadow and Formal Garden	A flower lover's zone, these two areas will have varieties of both garden and wild flowers to enjoy. Near to one of the food kiosks and overlooking the lakefront promenade, a walk among the meadow and the garden are highly solicited.
Rose Garden	This space is a long stretch of walk with varieties of roses planted along, colourful fountains sprinkling by, sculptures to feast the eye and occasional benches to rest a little.
Artist's Cottage	Overlooking the flower lake and breathing fresh air from the rose garden behind, this cottage is poised to be a dream destination to any poet, singer or painters to instigate their creative urges
Eco Children's Park	With fountains, play areas, sculptures and elevated platforms connected by causeways, this area is a dynamic space intended to stimulate play and learning experiences in a garden setting.
Formal Garden 2	Located between the upcoming Visitor Centre and Eco Children's Park, Formal Garden 2 explores the concept of vertical gardening amidst a flat landscape.
Graffiti Walls	The wall along the South Parking has been rejuvenated by colourful paintings. The two sides of the wall had been taken up by two eminent artists of our era - JogenChowdhury and Subhaprasanna and transformed into canvases of artwork.
Butterfly Garden	The garden is poised to consist of a large dome to enclose a plant habitat consisting of different species of flowering annuals and perennials that support a large range of butterflies organised around a circular body of water.
Play Area	Right next to the Butterfly Garden, the Play Area offer learner's golf courses amidst a green landscape.
Bamboo Garden	The Bamboo Garden is a specialised garden showcasing multiple varieties of bamboo. The planting effects is designed to create a variety of experiences through imaginative bamboo plant mixes with species ranging from giant varieties to short grasses.
Fruits Garden	A thematic zone dedicated to the Bengal delicacy of fruits, to showcase the bountiful nature of this part of earth and to encourage nature learning through identification of fruit bearing trees.
Food Court	The Food Court will provide more affordable dining options to the visitors. Around 20 food stalls are being arranged in a cluster around a square courtyard that also has four dining pavilions.
Adda Zone	Placed opposite to the Artist's Cottage, the Adda Zone consists of simple seating arrangements overlooking the lake and the musical fountains.
Musical Fountain	As the name suggests, fountains, music and laser shows have been prepared on the Northern banks of the lake. The view is visible from all around the Park when the fountains start showering in the evenings and laser shows tell stories on the water screen.
Tea Garden	A touch and feel of Darjeeling has come up near Gate No. 1. This zone includes winding pathways through a tea plantation area – complete with a composting plant.
Mask Garden	Near the Northern parking lot and adjacent to the tea garden, this new zone has masks from various districts of West Bengal, then various states of India and finally from various countries of the world.
Eco Island	A vast area of 190 hectares (480 acres) of green terrain surrounding a water body is being developed in Eco Park which has been opened by the Hon’ble Chief Minister, West Bengal on 29 December 2012 for the public. Within Eco Park there is an island named 'Sabujsathi'. The island is in centre of the huge lake of Eco Park comprising an area of 28,000 square metres (7 acres) which is accessible only by boat. This is an uninhabited island. On this Sabujsathi Island an amazing glass house has been built. All four sides of this 260 square metres (2,800 ft^{2}) building is made of glass. There are three open-air viewing galleries, green lawn and paved pathways in the island.

== Special events ==
On 5 January 2013, Vokatta - a kite festival was organized by Benchmark Developers Pvt. Ltd, in association with HIDCO (West Bengal Housing Infrastructure Development Corporation) in Eco Park ground. There was an open invitation for all to participate after 11 AM onwards.

On 5 January 2014, again Vokatta-2014 was organised by Benchmark NewTown Kolkata International Kite Festival Trust, In co operation with WBHIDCO. Kite fliers from the UK, Netherlands, Belgium, Italy, the US, Singapore and Malaysia participated in Vokatta 2014. National kite fliers from Ahmedabad, Bengaluru, Kochi, Mumbai and Rajkot also joined the festivity, This year, the emphasis was on Fancy kites. Hot Air Balloon was another attraction.

== See also ==
- Kolkata Museum of Modern Art
- Nicco Park
- Millennium Park
- Nature Park
