= Rabindra Tirtha =

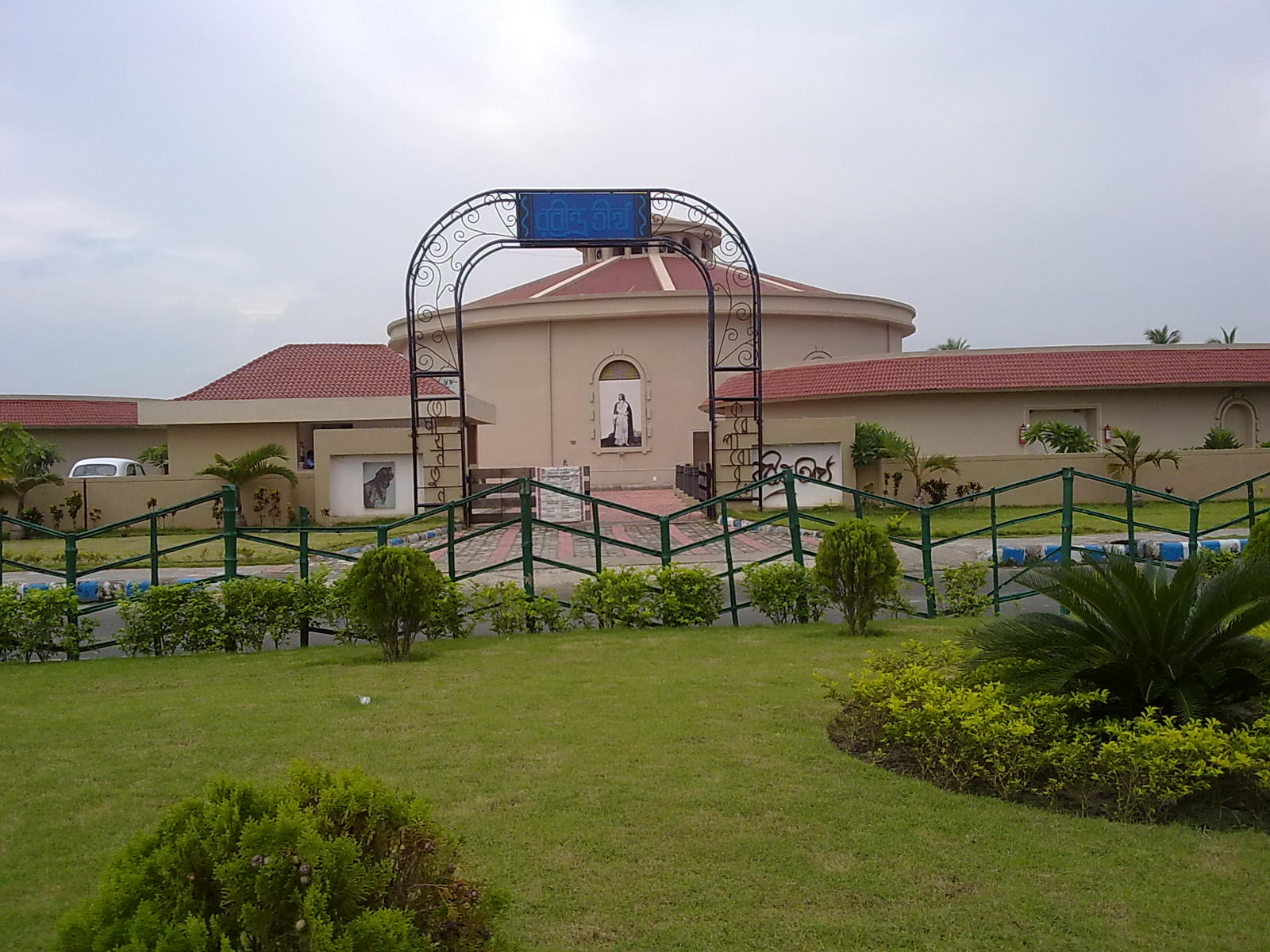
- Interactive map of the Rabindra Tirtha area

General information
- Type: Culture
- Architectural style: Modern / Bengali (Santiniketani)
- Location: Narkel Bagan, New Town, Greater Kolkata, West Bengal, India
- Completed: 2011-12

Technical details
- Floor area: 20,000 square metres (5 acres)

Rabindra Tirtha Complex; Tagore Pilgrimage is a cultural center in Narkel Bagan, Action Area - I of New Town, Kolkata. It is dedicated to Rabindranath Tagore. It is a project developed by the HIDCO and houses an exhibition of Tagore's paintings, archives, a research centre, an auditorium. and dormitories for students opting to conduct their research on Tagore. It was inaugurated by Mamata Banerjee, Chief Minister of West Bengal on 8 August 2012.

== See also ==
- HIDCO
- Nazrul Tirtha
