= West Bengal Housing Infrastructure Development Corporation =

Housing Corporation in West Bengal, India

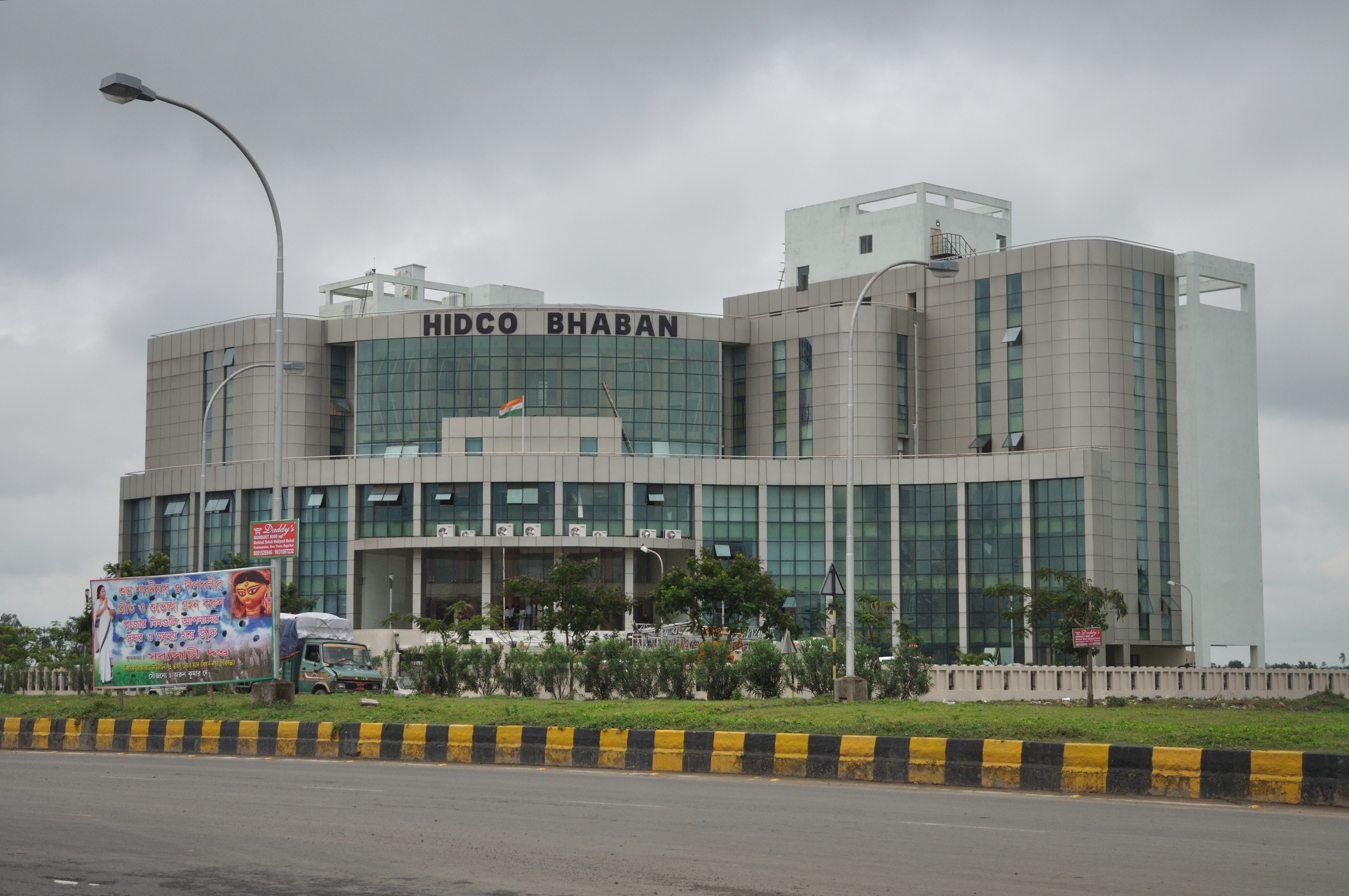
- Headquarters at HIDCO Bhawan
- Industry: Infrastructure
- Founded: 10 June 1999; 27 years ago
- Headquarters: HIDCO Bhawan, New Town, Greater Kolkata, West Bengal, India
- Area served: West Bengal, India
- Key people: Vacant (Chairman)
- Services: Infrastructure development; Housing development
- Owner: Government of West Bengal
- Parent: Government of West Bengal
- Website: www.wbhidcoltd.com

West Bengal Housing Infrastructure Development Corporation (abbreviated as HIDCO) is a Government of West Bengal owned public sector undertaking headquartered in Narkelbagan, Action Area- I of New Town, Kolkata, West Bengal, India. It plans and executes infrastructure and housing development projects in West Bengal which includes buildings, parks, museum, subways, overbridges, drains, sewerage line, water supply lines, beautification works and others.

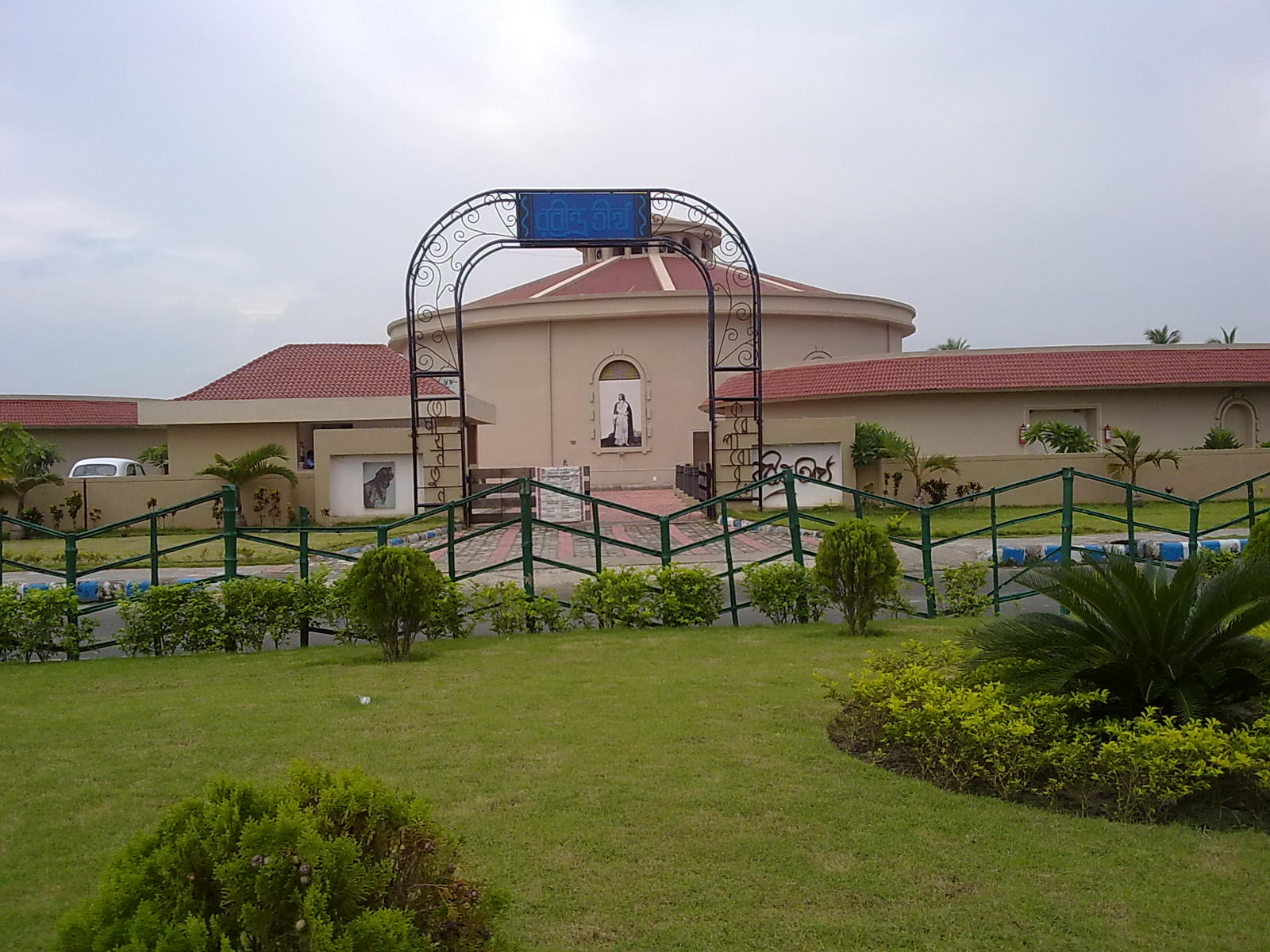
Rabindra Tirtha, a project governed by the HIDCO

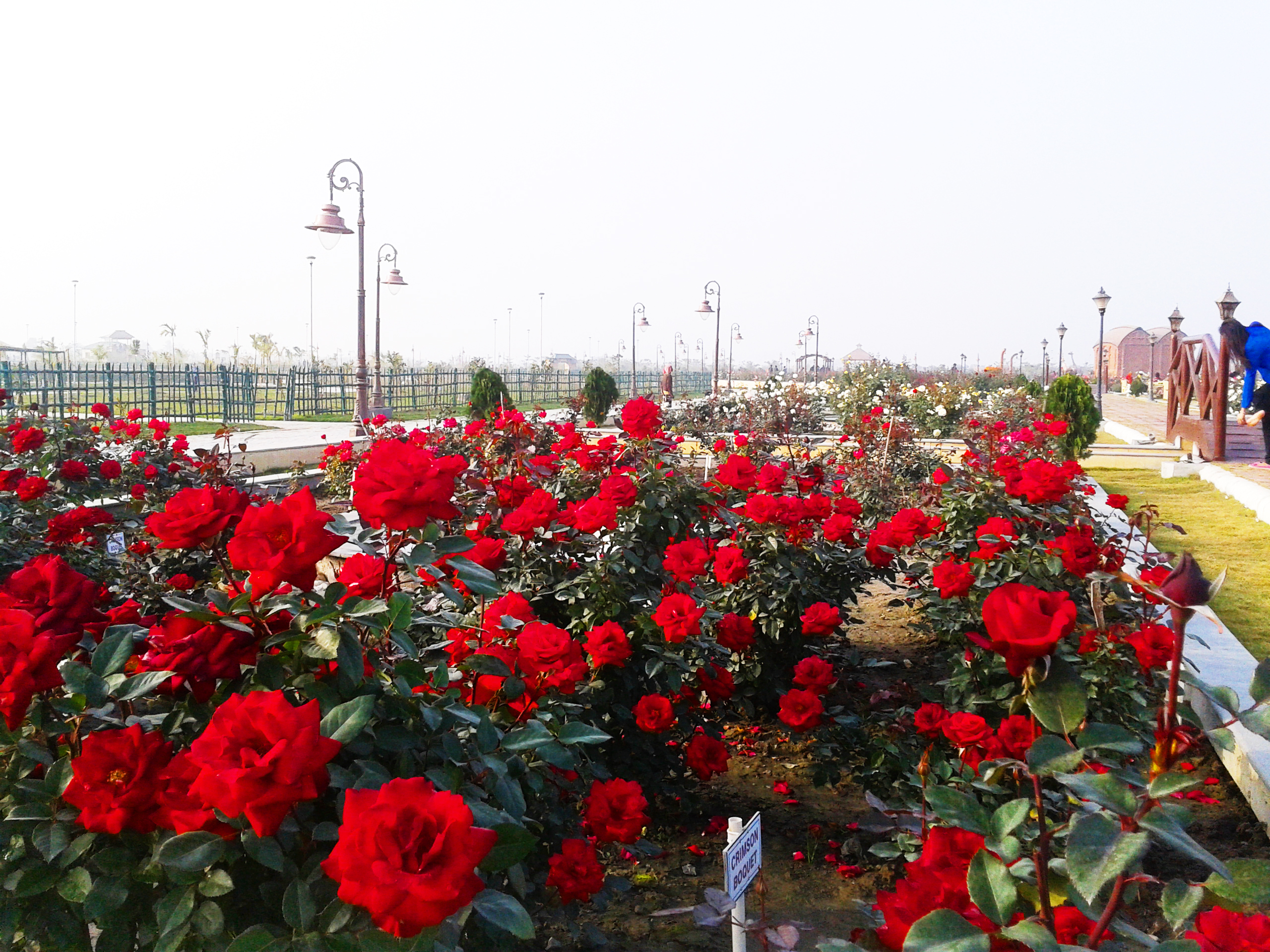
Roses blooming in the rose garden during winter in the New Town Eco Park in New Town, Kolkata, a project developed by the HIDCO

== Notable works ==
Many well known constructions such as the KMOMA, New Town Eco Park, Biswa Bangla Gate, International Finance Hub of Kolkata, Rabindra Tirtha, Nazrul Tirtha, Vocational Training Institute, N-S Corridor, Convention Center etc. are some of the projects developed by HIDCO. Monorail from Ultadanga to New Town via Salt Lake was also proposed by HIDCO.

== See also ==
- Bidhannagar, Kolkata
- KMOMA
- Rabindra Tirtha
- New Town Eco Park
- Government of West Bengal
