= Padre Pio Wax Museum =

Wax museum in San Giovanni Rotondo, Italy

Coordinates: 41°42′27.7″N 15°43′38.8″E

- Museo delle Cere di Padre Pio
- Location: San Giovanni Rotondo, Italy

The Padre Pio Wax Museum (Italian: Museo delle Cere di Padre Pio) is a wax museum located in the city of San Giovanni Rotondo, Italy.

Located in the Morcaldi Palace, near the Sanctuary of Saint Pio of Pietrelcina, it is a thematic museum about the life of the famous saint and Capuchin friar Padre Pio.

== History ==
The Padre Pio Wax Museum, also known as the Padre Pio Biographical Museum, is a wax museum created in 2001 by the Florence Museum Project Society, in close collaboration with the San Giovanni Rotondo City Council.

It is located in the historic center of the city (Via Pirgiano, No. 25), in the building – Palazzo Morcaldi – where Knight Francesco Morcaldi lived, who was several times mayor of San Giovanni Rotondo and a close friend of Padre Pio of Pietrelcina. In the 1920s, Francesco Morcaldi made every effort to prevent the expulsion of Padre Pio from San Giovanni Rotondo, personally leading civic demonstrations in support of the famous Capuchin friar, among other actions.

The museum's rooms features important scenes from the life of Saint Pio of Pietrelcina. Following a complete renovation of the Morcaldi Palace, the ten scenes that form the core of the museum were prepared. These, after a meticulous study of Padre Pio's life, were chosen with the advice of the Capuchin Friars Minor of San Giovanni Rotondo and a special commission composed of historians and members of the City Council. Part of the scenes were created in Pisa, in the studios of OPUS, a professional association formed by young and sensitive artists responsible for the conception and execution of the work, and subsequently completed on site between April 9 and May 9, 2001. The 10 life-size wax scenes by artist Cristian Biasci, depicting significant episodes such as his stigmata, his meeting with Fra Camillo, and his death, are set in precise and detailed scenographic settings.

The museum remains open to the general public to date.

== See also ==
- Padre Pio of Pietrelcina
- Sanctuary of Saint Pio of Pietrelcina
- Padre Pio TV
