= BibleWalk =

Wax museum in Mansfield, Ohio

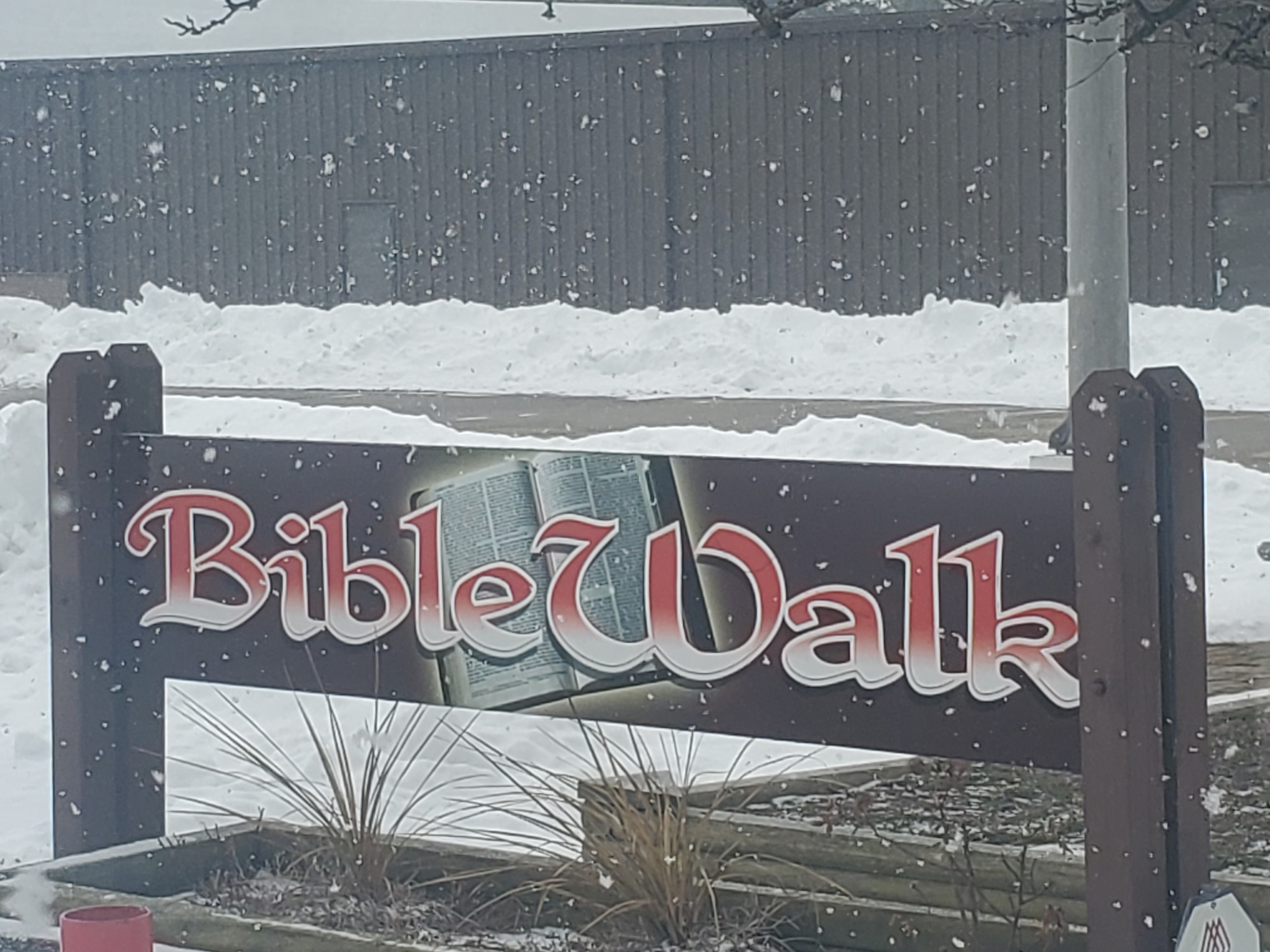
- Sign for BibleWalk in the snow

- Location within Ohio
- Former name: The Living Bible Museum
- Established: August 15, 1987
- Location: 500 Tingley Ave, Mansfield, Ohio
- Coordinates: 40.785861°N 82.496707°W
- Type: Wax museum
- Visitors: 30,000–50,000/year
- Director: Julie Mott-Hardin
- Parking: On site (no charge)
- Website: biblewalk.us

BibleWalk (formerly The Living Bible Museum) is a nondenominational Christian wax museum in Madison Township, just outside Mansfield, Ohio, affiliated with the Diamond Hill Cathedral. It depicts scenes of religious importance for Christians, primarily from the Bible.

The museum has received attention for its use of celebrity wax figures in its scenes, acquired from celebrity wax museums that were closing. This was done as a cost-saving measure when new wax figures were deemed too expensive. The museum attempts to make the celebrity figures unrecognizable.

== Collections ==
The museum contains five tours, 78 scenes, and over 300 life-size figures made of wax, Fiberglas, and vinyl. The figures are posed in scenes that may include other figures, taxidermy, and objects in front of painted backgrounds. Additionally, each scene includes music, narration, and special effects.

The collection includes a rare wax tableau of The Last Supper created by Marie Tussaud. The museum also holds collections of rare Bibles, religious woodcarvings, and American votive folk art. In 2020, the Museum of Woodcarving, a collection of 100 life-size carved wood statues by Joseph Barta, was incorporated into BibleWalk's collection, and went on display in 2021.

Promotional materials for the museum have identified it as "holy ground."

== History ==
The idea for the museum was conceived by Pastor Richard and Mrs. Alwilda Diamond of the Faith Revivals church in the early 1970s after they saw a religious scene in a wax museum in Atlanta.

The first three scenes were constructed at the Diamond Hill Cathedral: The Last Supper was completed in August 1983, followed by Jesus and the Children and The Woman at the Well in December 1983. The figures were Fiberglas, acquired from William Warren's Bible Walk in Collier Township, Pennsylvania. Scenes were displayed at county fairs and the Ohio State Fair.

In September 1985, construction on a standalone museum began in nearby vegetable garden. When the museum opened on August 15, 1987, it was known as The Living Bible Museum and had 16 scenes. It was renamed to BibleWalk in 2004.

The museum was created almost entirely by church members and donated labor, and is maintained and managed by volunteers. The museum is recognized by the IRS as a nonprofit organization.

== Tourism ==
Even before it opened, it was anticipated that the museum would draw tour buses of visitors interested in religious attractions. BibleWalk attracts out-of-town guests and boosts the local economy, hosting 40,000 visitors in 2015. Many visitors come from Detroit and Cleveland, with some as far away as Germany, Africa, Asia, and Indonesia.

In 2016, BibleWalk was recognized as having achieved Excellence in Tourism by the Mansfield/Richland County Convention and Visitors Bureau. In 2018, BibleWalk's Dinner With Grace events were inducted into the Tourism Hall of Fame by Destination Mansfield-Richland County.
