= Wax Museum at Fishermans Wharf =

Coordinates: 37°48′29.79″N 122°24′53.24″W

The Wax Museum at Fisherman's Wharf, San Francisco, was an attraction with over 270 wax figures. Originator Thomas Fong opened the museum in 1963 after seeing the wax figures at the Seattle World's Fair and it was run by the Fong Family until its closure in 2013. It has attracted over 400,000 visitors a year.

== Founder ==
Thomas L. Fong was born in Canton Province, China on January 4, 1913 and grew up in a small village. He emigrated to San Francisco, aged 17, when a family friend who was there offered to sponsor a member of the family. By 1938 he was running a jewelry store, and developing real estate projects.

In the early 1960s Fong bought a run-down grain mill called Smith Anderson Mill, near Fisherman’s Wharf and decided to open the Wax Museum at Fisherman's Wharf. The attraction opened on May 12, 1963. With the success of their first museum, the family purchased Movieland Wax Museum in Buena Park, California on April 1, 1985 and operated it until it closed on October 31, 2005.

By 1989, Tommy, as he was known at Fisherman's Wharf, decided to leave the Management and Operations of the Wax Museum and other family businesses to his son, Ron Fong and his grandson, Rodney Fong. Tommy died on November 26, 2000, aged 87.

== New building ==
The old Wax Museum Entertainment Complex Building was demolished in 1998, having had over 10 million visitors since it opened, including almost half a million in the year before it closed. It reopened two years later in a new 100,000-square-foot (9,300 m^{2}) four-story building, designed by MBH Architects. Inspired by French Victorian public architecture, it cost $18m and includes retail space and a restaurant. The Wax Museum at Fisherman's Wharf officially reopened on July 13, 2000 in the basement of the new building and lies nine feet below the bay level. According to Rodney Fong, in 2008 it was attracting 250,000 visitors a year of whom around 10% were from abroad.

The last day of business for The Wax Museum at Fisherman's Wharf was August 15, 2013.

In 2014 the Merlin Entertainments signed a multi year real estate transaction with the Wax Museum Entertainment Complex Building to invest $35 million to open a Madame Tussauds Wax Attraction at Fisherman’s Wharf. Madame Tussauds San Francisco opened for business in June 2014 and featured a new series of wax figures, created by Madame Tussauds.

== Exhibits ==
The museum displayed a few figures of current interest in the lobby, which was open to the street. The bodies of the wax statues were made of wood, fiberglass, papier-mâché and beeswax. The process to make each figure and prepare it for display took approximately two or three months. Many of the sculptures were created by Gem's Wax Figures in London. A few were crafted by Ron Fong, others by Los Angeles wax sculptor Henry Alvarez, and the museum's resident sculptor, Kahn Gasimov who was hired away from London's Madame Tussauds.

The underground exhibits contained more than 270 figures and scenes, ranging from The Last Supper and Wizard of Oz to King Tut and the Chamber of Horrors which included Anton LaVey, the late San Francisco satanist whose wax figure attended his funeral. There were famous sports-people and important historical figures including a display of dictators featuring Fidel Castro, Saddam Hussein, Napoleon Bonaparte and Hideki Tōjō. A display of World War II generals featured an authentic World War II Willys jeep and the sound of explosions and machine-gun fire. A scientists' section included Galileo, Albert Einstein and Bill Gates. Other displays included famous composers, artists and current celebrities.
