= New Town, Kolkata =

Smart City and satellite city of Kolkata, India

New Town Rajarhat-New Town
- Satellite City
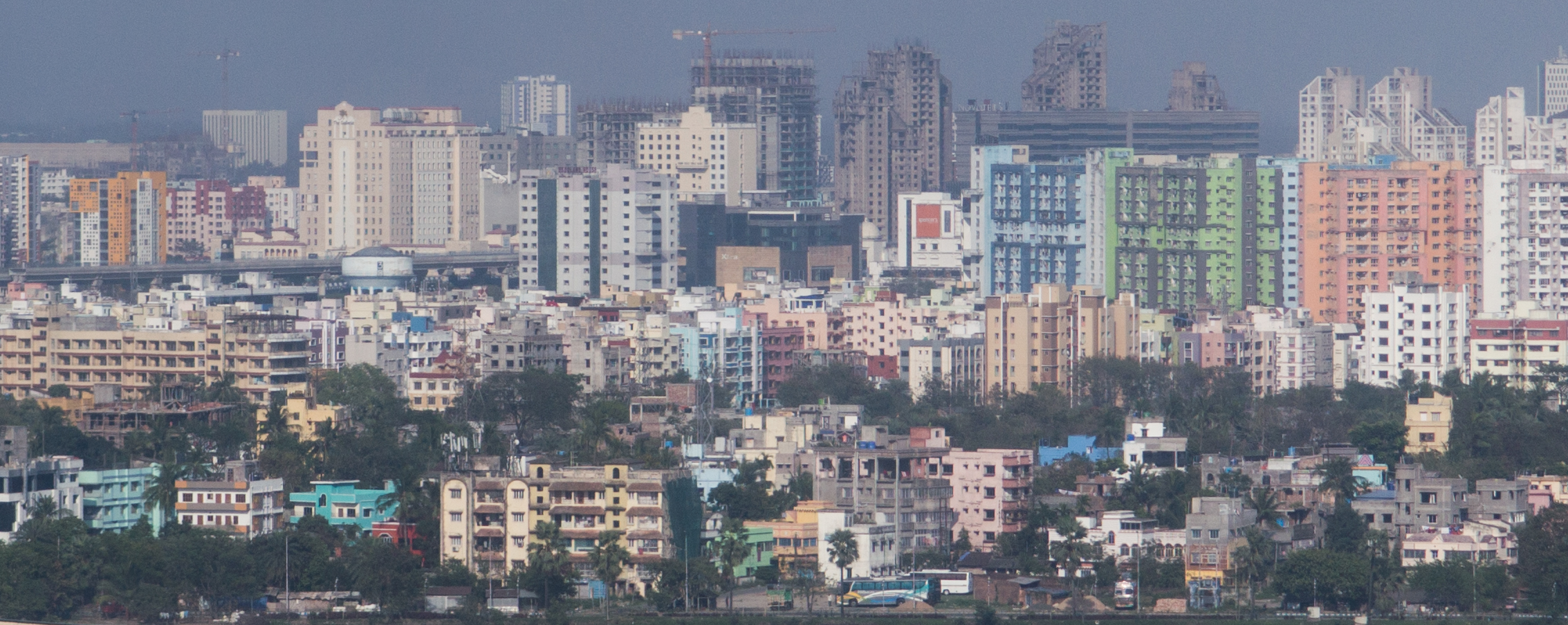
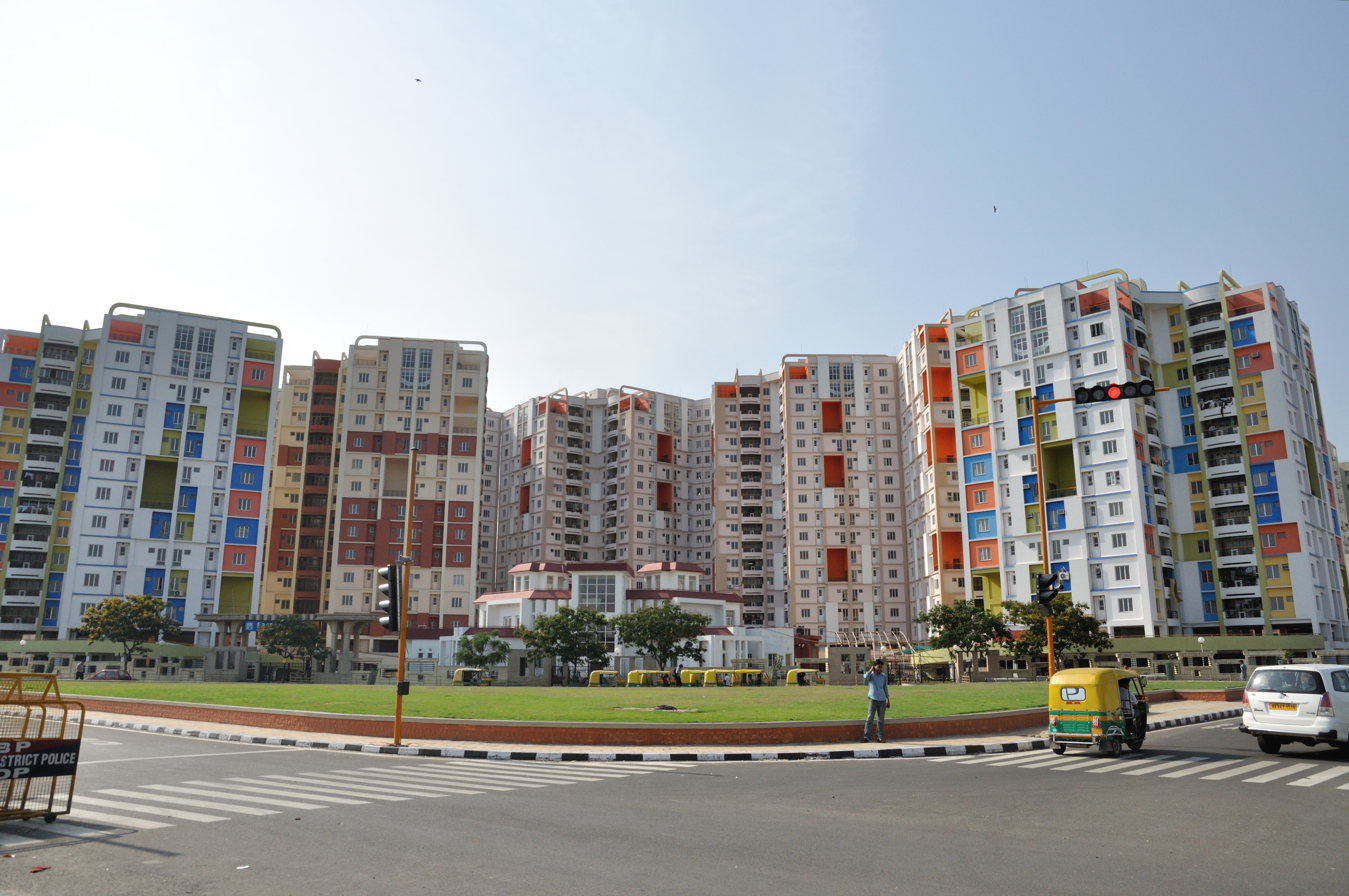
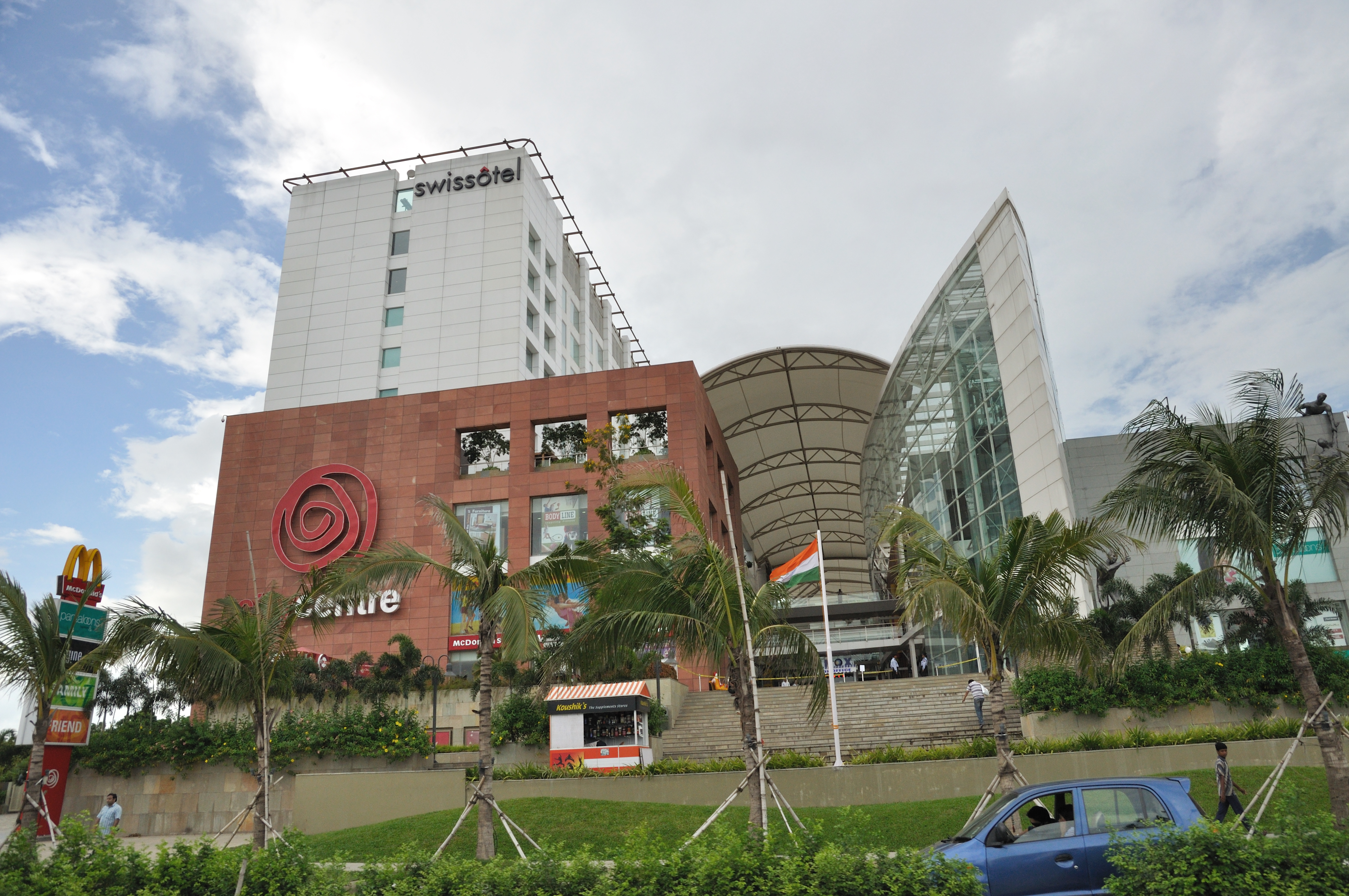
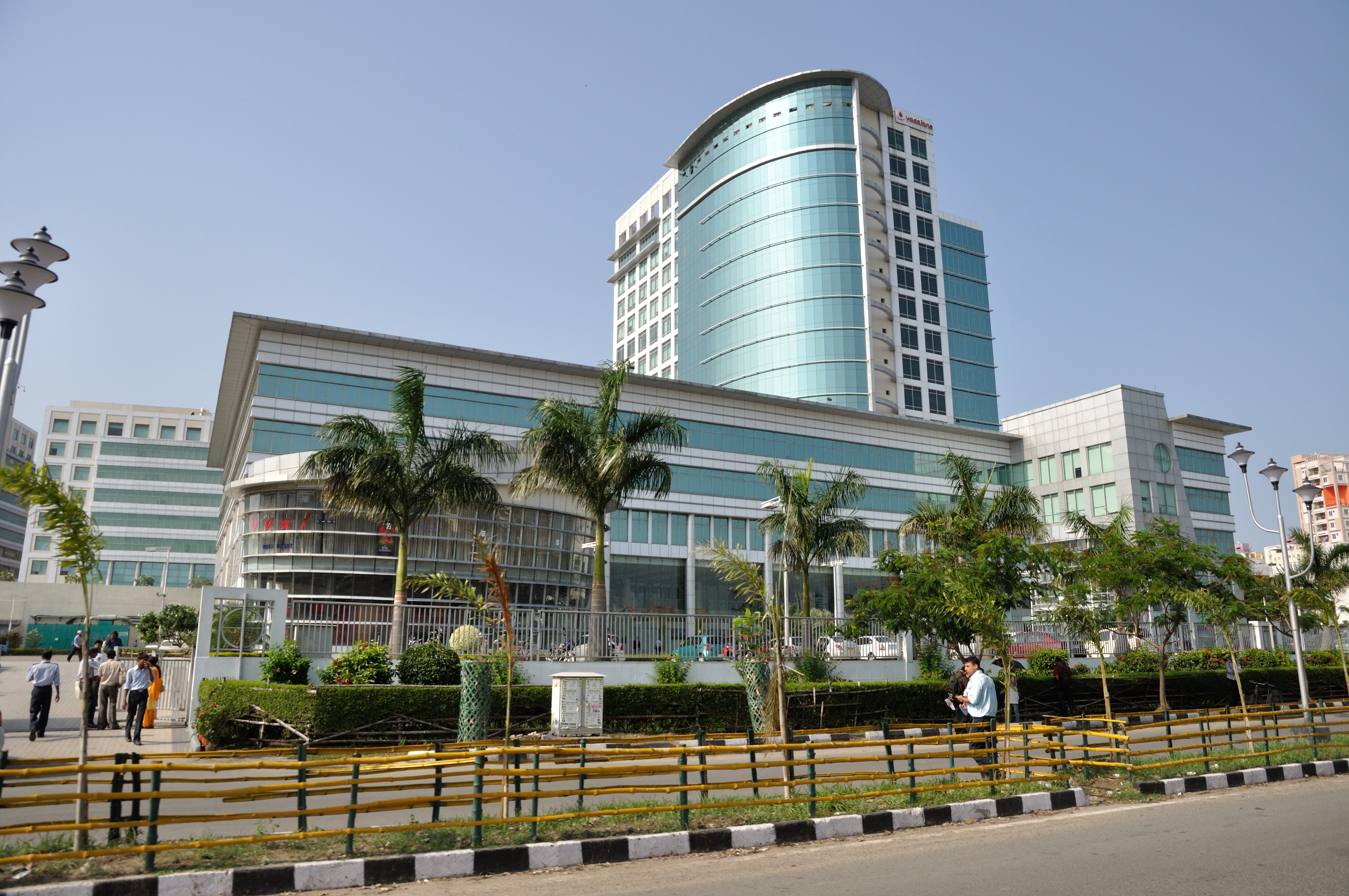
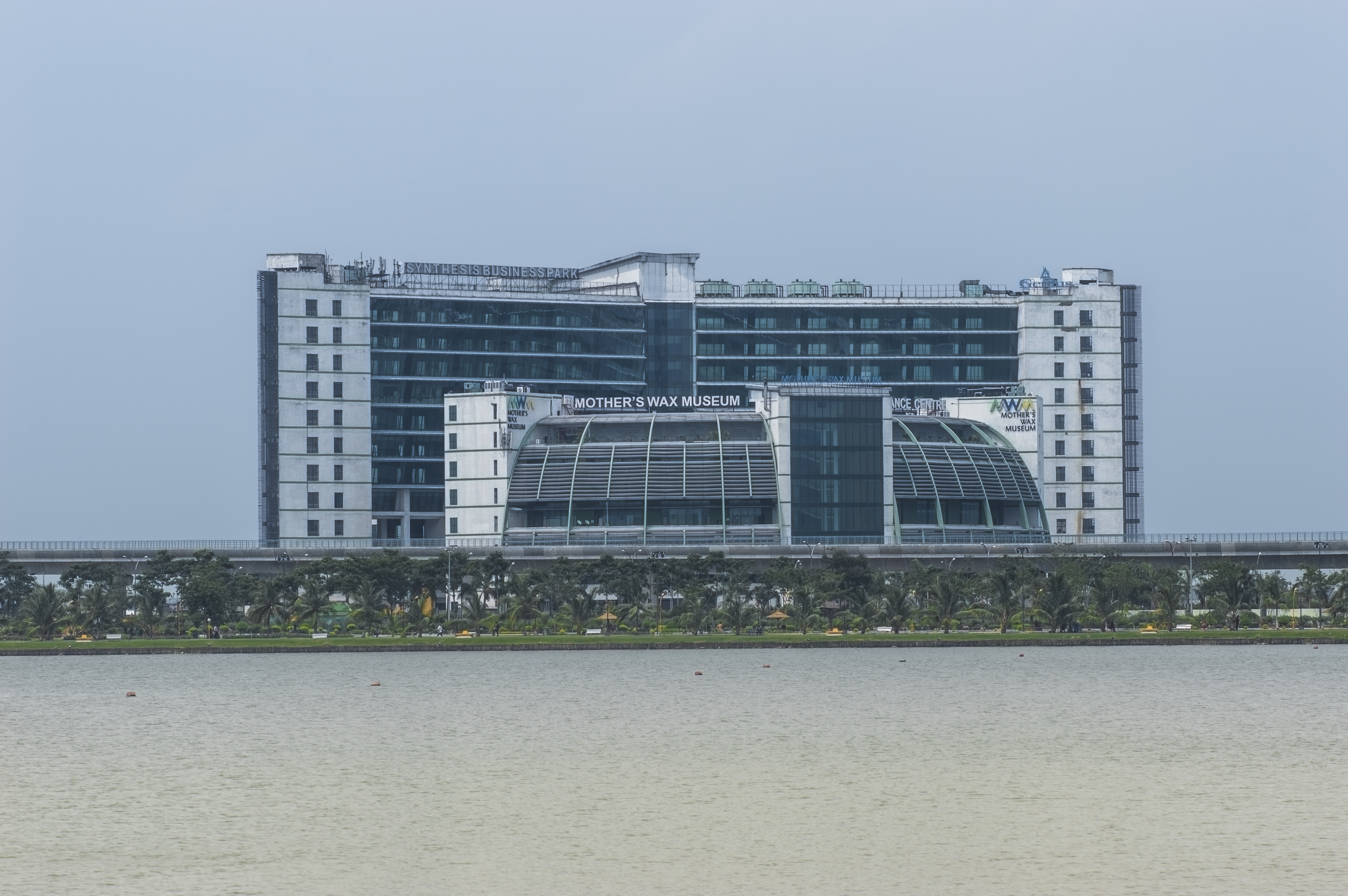
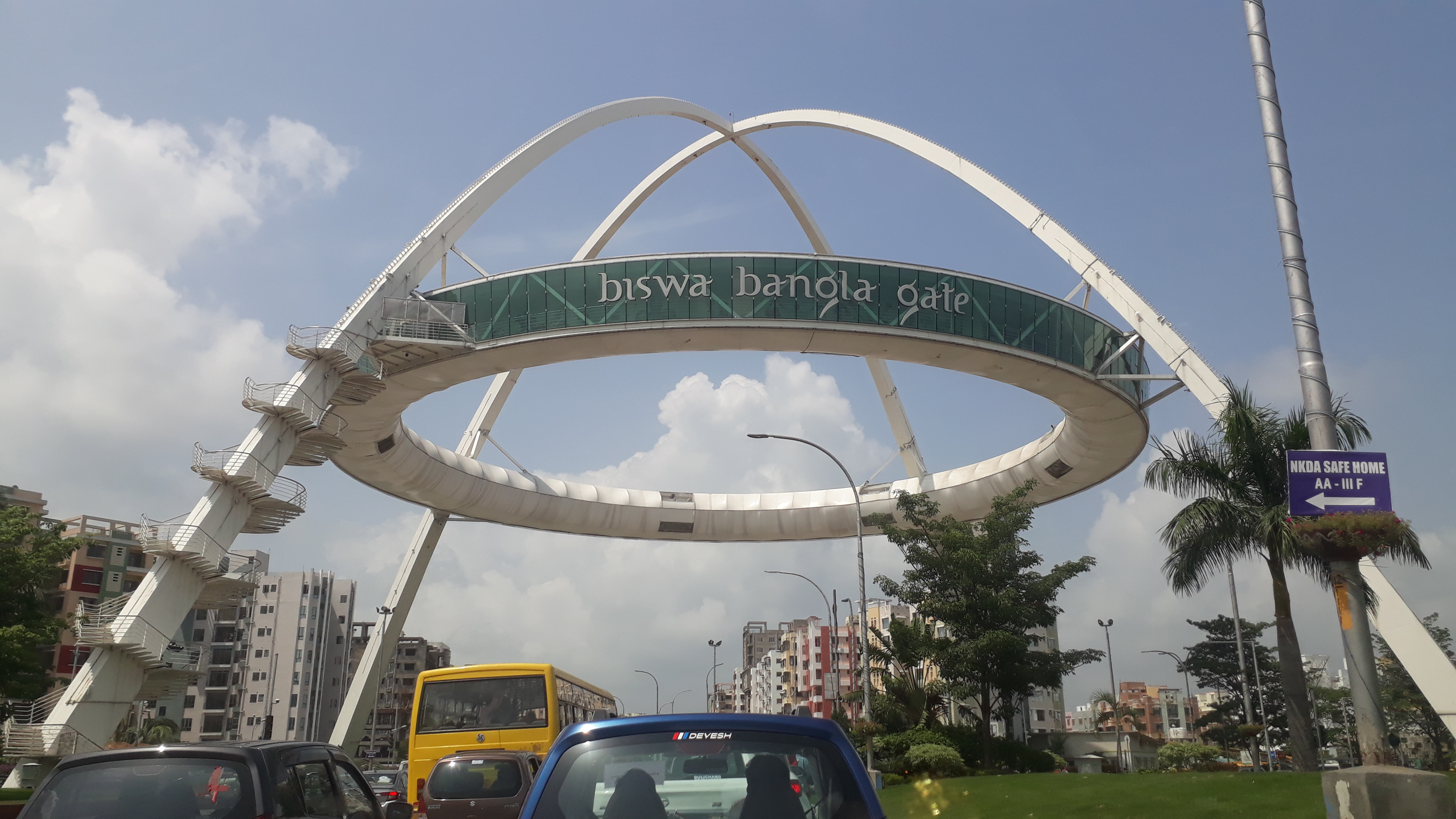
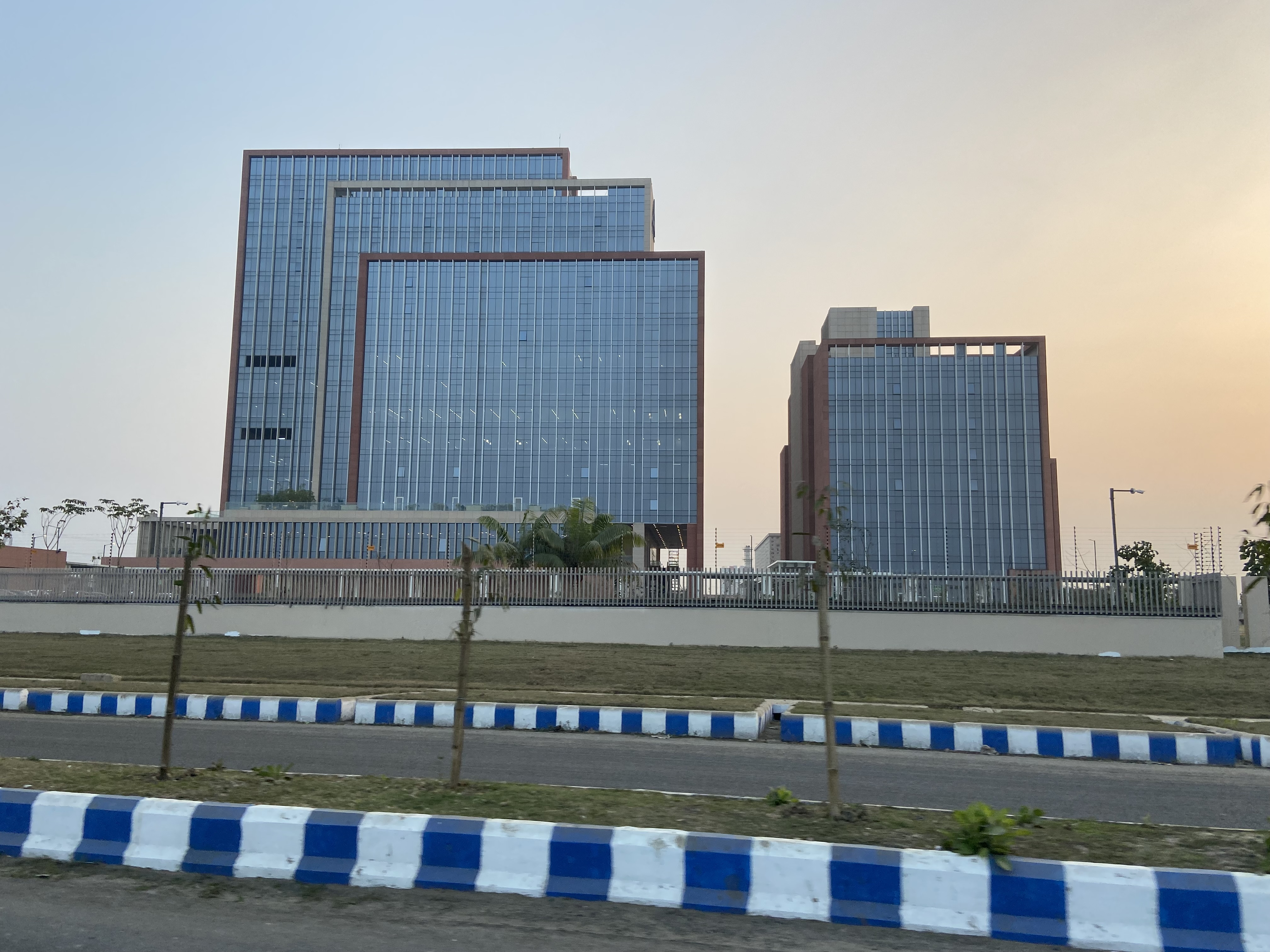
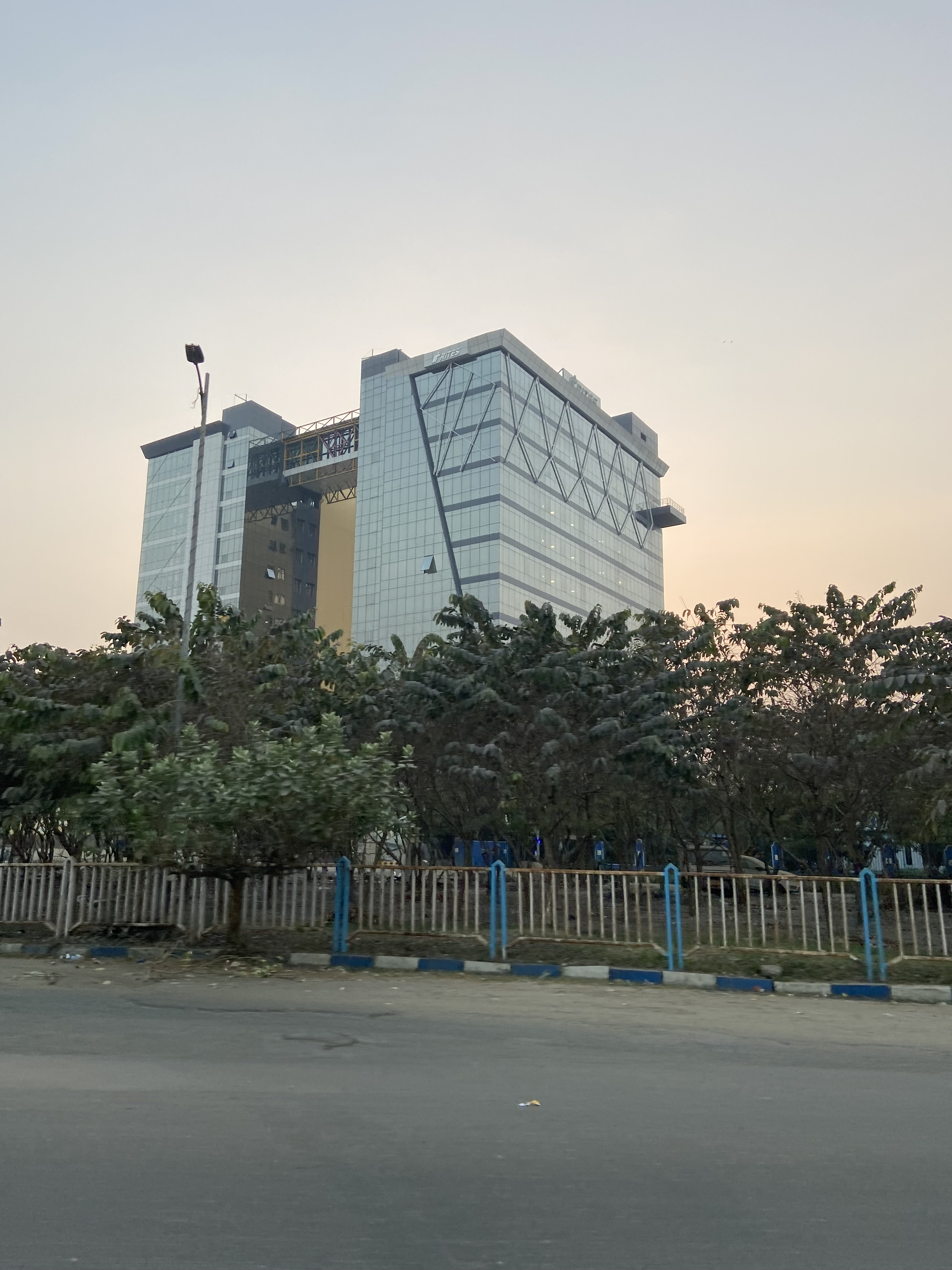
- New Town skyline Apartment high-rises in New Town Rajarhat City Centre 2 DLF IT Park Mother's Wax Museum Biswa Bangla Gate ITC Green Center RITES

- Location in West Bengal Location in India
- Coordinates: 22.5894°N 88.4748°E
- Country: India
- State: West Bengal
- Division: Presidency
- District: North 24 Parganas
- Established: November 2008

Government
  - Type: Statutory Development Board
  - Body: New Town Kolkata Development Authority; West Bengal Housing Infrastructure Development Corporation (HIDCO)

Area
  - Total: 93.3 km^{2} (36.0 sq mi)
- Elevation: 9 m (30 ft)

Population (July 2018)
  - Total: 400,000−500,000
  - Density: 1,218/km^{2} (3,150/sq mi)

Languages
  - Official: Bengali; English
- Time zone: UTC+5:30 (IST)
- PIN: 700135, 700136, 700156, 700157, 700160, 700161
- Telephone code: +91 33
- Vehicle registration: WB07, WB08, WB25, WB26
- Lok Sabha constituency: Barasat
- Vidhan Sabha constituency: Rajarhat-New Town
- Website: nkdamar.org; wbhidcoltd.com

New Town (a.k.a. Rajarhat-New Town) is a planned Satellite city of Kolkata in the Indian state of West Bengal. It is administered by NKDA (New Town Kolkata Development Authority). New Town is declared as a "Solar City" and "Smart Green City" by Government of India.

HIDCO plans developing infrastructure like - roads, drains, sewerage line, water supply lines, major embellishment works and executed constructions like - buildings, projects, parks, museum, subways, over-bridges in New Town. An information technology and residential hub is developed at New Town. New Town was enabled with 10.5 km of Wi-Fi Zone along the Major Arterial Road (part of Biswa Bangla Sarani) from Haldiram, near Kolkata Airport to Salt Lake Sector V, which also make it India's first Wi-Fi road connectivity. The stretch has already been declared as a green corridor.

== History ==
The area mainly consisted of huge acres of cultivable lands and water bodies, which was acquired and developed in a planned manner. The process of investing in residential and industrial facilities and infrastructural development of the area was mainly started under the leadership of the then Chief Minister of West Bengal, Jyoti Basu in the late 1990s. The master plan envisions a township which is at least three times bigger than the neighbouring planned Salt Lake City.

New Town was declared as a Solar City by the former UPA-lead Government of India and later this city was declared as Smart Green City by NDA-lead Government of India with the help of Government of West Bengal following a proposal submitted by Mamata Banerjee (Chief Minister of West Bengal) but later withdrawn from the Smart Cities Mission after the AITC-governed Bengal government decided to withdraw all cities of West Bengal from the competition. It has rejected ₹1,000 crore to be given for development of the city as smart city.

== Geography ==
Most of New Town is in North 24 Parganas district. It was declared as a part of the Kolkata Metropolitan Area in August 2016 by Governor of West Bengal.

== Cityscape ==
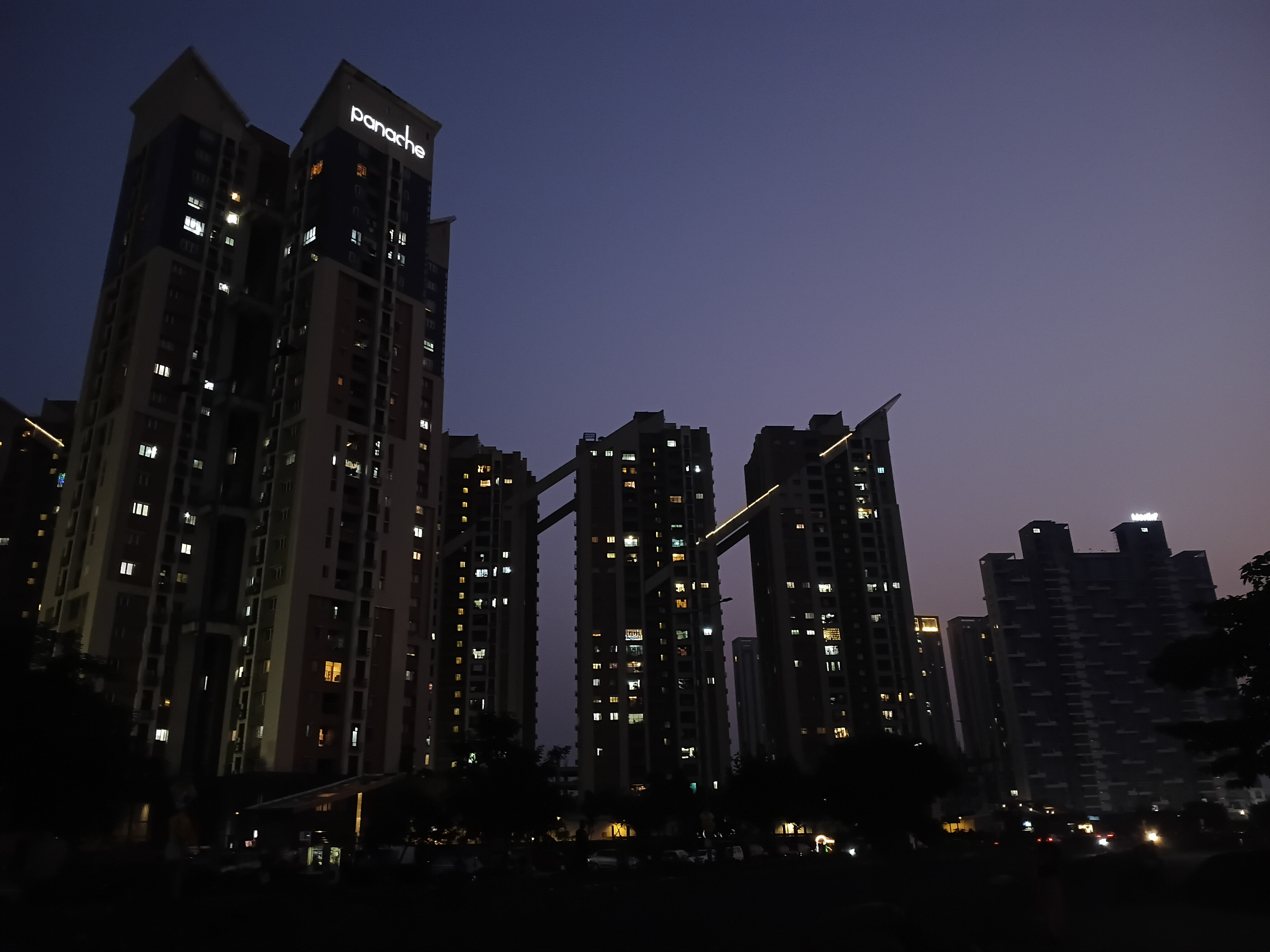
Panache towers, Mahish bathan, Newtown

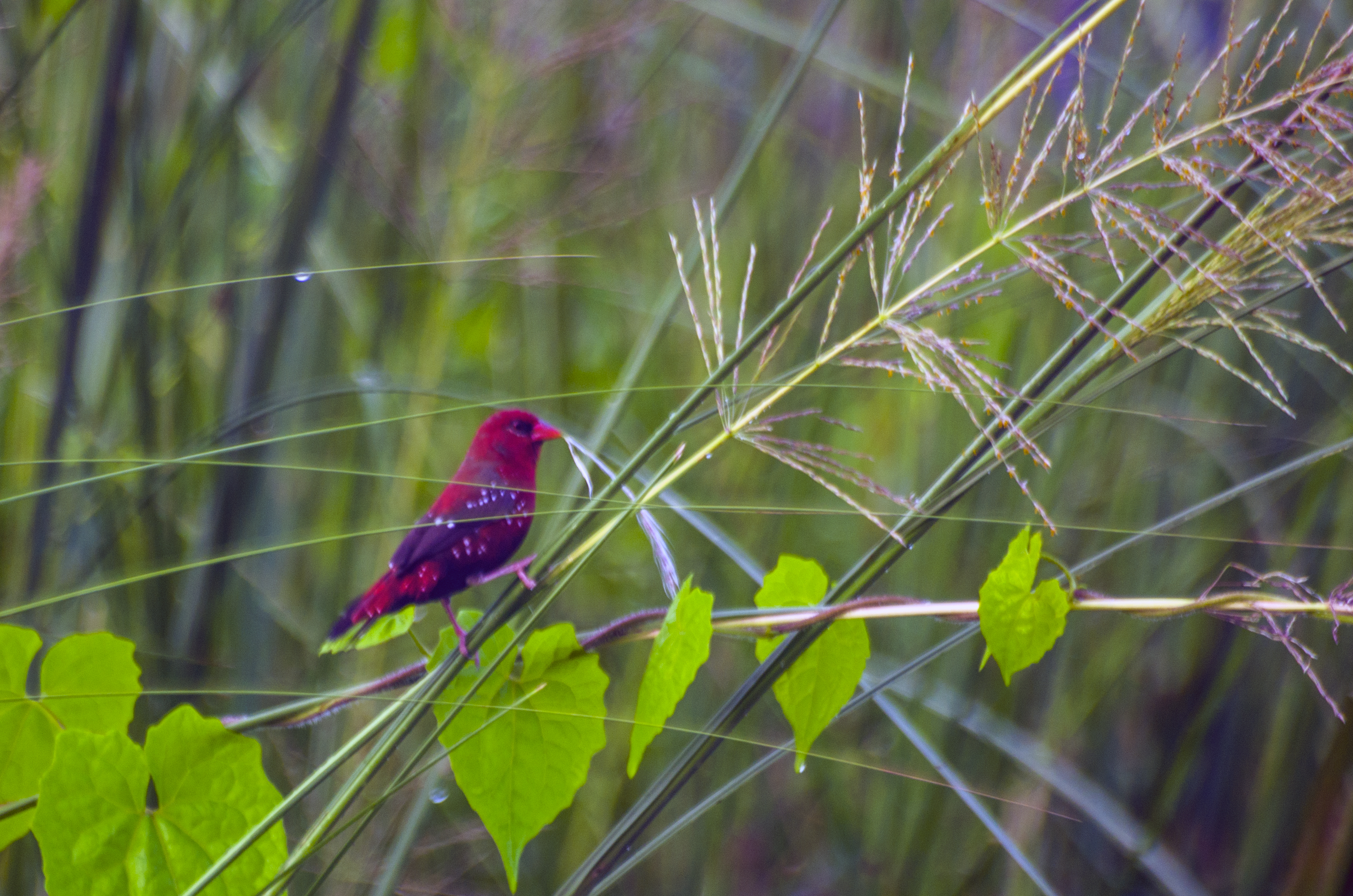
Red Munia (male) at New Town marshland

=== Planning ===
New Town has a proposed area of 93.9 km^{2} in which 30.8 km^{2} is used for township and 60.354 km^{2} area is under planning. The township of New Town is divided into Action Area I, II, III and a Central Business District. The erstwhile planning area of HIDCO also included Action Area - IV (still not started). The Central Business District (CBD) is located between Action Area - I & II. HIDCO installed the geographic information system (GIS) to integrate the database on the number of house owners, property tax, mutation, building construction etc. in New Town.

=== Townships or residential projects ===
- Uniworld City
- Shapoorji Pallonji Shukhobrishti
- Merlin RISE
- Skill City

Launched by Ambuja Neotia group and HDFC group in 2023, it is a 72-acre township with an investment of ₹550 Crores. The township will have Nursing College, Hospital, Para medical College, IT/ITes space, Residential Towers, Villas and Club house with 25% reserved for economically weaker sections.

=== Tech hub ===
New Town has emerged as the second IT hub of Kolkata after Salt Lake. Growing number of tech parks makes New Town a preferred destination for IT and ITes in East India. Several Information Technology majors are operational like Ericsson, Accenture, Capgemini, Tech Mahindra, ITC Infotech, Mindtree, Adani Labs, British Telecom, TCS, Wipro, Infosys, Cognizant Traditional Packers & Logistics New Town etc. New Town also houses Bengal Silicon Valley Tech Hub.

=== Financial hub ===
Fintech hub is developed in New Town by HIDCO with many national and international firms like PNB, HDFC Bank, Axis Bank and SBI showing interest in the project with their investment in different stages of implementation.

=== Hotels ===
Many luxurious hotels like Fairfield by Marriott, Novotel, Ibis, Taj Hotels, Westin Hotels & Resorts, The Park Hotels, Holiday Inn, Wyndham Hotels & Resorts, Lemon Tree Hotels, Ozen Mansion Kolkata etc. have also come up in the area.

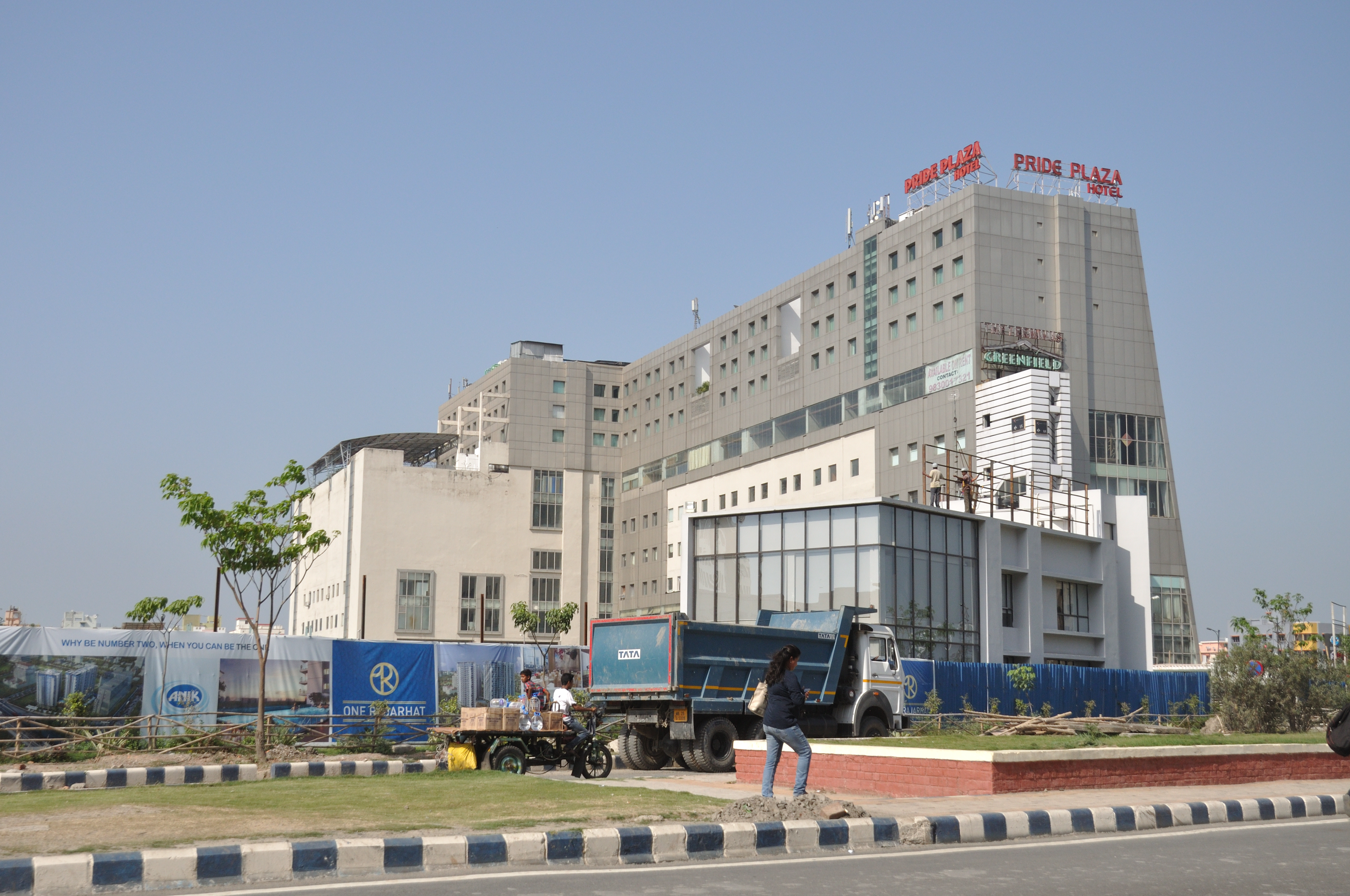
Pride Plaza Hotel

== Transport ==
=== Roads ===
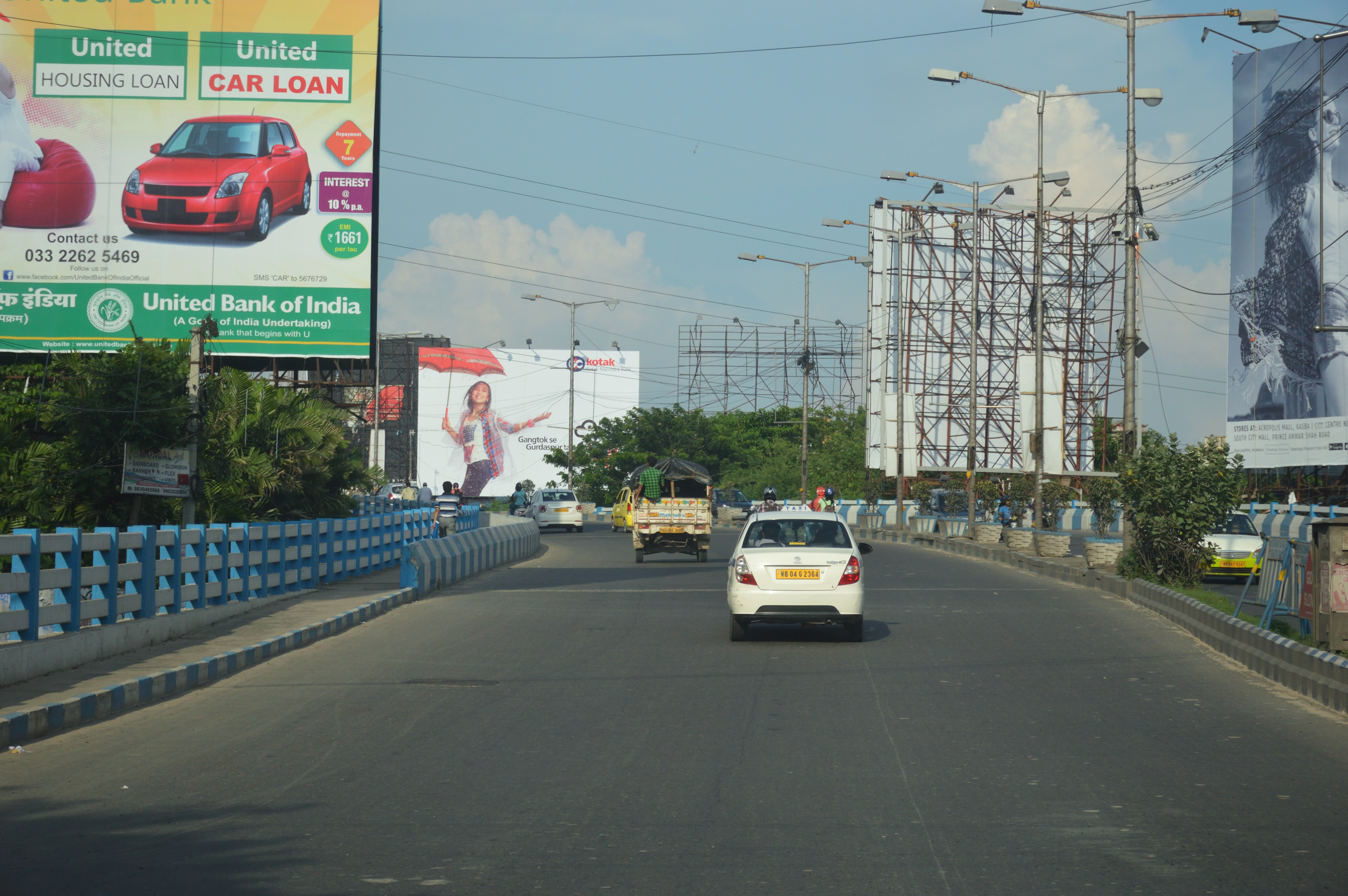
Box Bridge connects New Town with Salt Lake along Biswa Bangla Sarani over Kestopur Canal

Biswa Bangla Sarani connects Action Area I and II. It also connects New Town to the Netaji Subhas Chandra Bose International Airport. The New Town Road and Gitanjali Road also serves as major connectors between Action Area III and Action Area II. The main mode of road transportation includes AC or non-AC government and private buses, taxi and other popular Indian transports like auto rickshaw and e-rickshaws. As of 2015, around 300 buses on 25 different bus routes, either passes through or originates from New Town.

=== Rapid transit ===
- Kolkata Metro Orange Line: As of November 2023, the New Garia–Dumdum/Kolkata Airport Line of the Kolkata Metro, which passes through New Town, is under-construction and expected to be open before 2026. The metro will be main linkage between Action Area I and II of New Town township.
- A Light Rail Transit System (LRTS) is planned to connect Action Area III to the Biswa Bangla Gate. The estimated cost of the project is around ₹4500 Crores.

== Demographics ==
As of April 2018, the residential population of New Town is estimated to be more than 1 million with 0.5 million additional floating population.

== Civic administration ==
=== Authority ===
The New Kolkata Development Authority (NKDA) has been constituted under The New Town Kolkata Development Authority Act, 2007 (The West Bengal Act XXX of 2007) for rendering various civic services and amenities within New Town, Kolkata and it has come into effect since November, 2008. It is a transitional arrangement in the way of creation of an Urban Local Body (ULB). The administration is headed by a chairman, exercising authority over a member secretary and chief executive officer, who in turn oversee various specific committees, set up to implement various duties.

Housing Infrastructure Development Corporation (HIDCO) plans and executes development projects in New Town, Kolkata.

=== Utility services ===
As of 2015, New Town gets 200 litre per capita per day (lcpd) of treated water every day with potable water that is sourced from the Hooghly River. Water treatment plants with computerised monitoring and control system are in place. 100% of the garbage is collected by sanitary workers through door to door collection. As of 2015, more than 70% of the solid waste management vehicles and street sweeping vehicles have been fitted with GPS devices for effective monitoring. All the garbage is compacted at compacting stations before disposing of it in dumping grounds.

Electricity is supplied and managed by New Town Electric Supply Company Limited (NTESCL). Fire services are handled by the West Bengal Fire Service, a state agency. The Bidhannagar Police Commissionerate looks after the law and order in the city.

State-owned Bharat Sanchar Nigam Limited (BSNL), as well as private enterprises, among them Vodafone, Bharti Airtel, Idea Cellular and Reliance Jio, are the leading telephone and cell phone service providers in the city. Kolkata being the first city in India to have cell phone and 4G connectivity, the GSM and CDMA cellular coverage is extensive in New Town.

=== 2023 Panchayat Poll Controversy ===
Although the NKDA had been tasked with carrying out civic functions within Newtown, the township continued to fall under the jurisdiction of the "Jyangra-Hatiara no II block" Panchayat for the purpose of polls to the rural local self-governing body. In early February 2023, the then Urban Development Minister, Firhad Hakim, had said that New Town cannot remain under a panchayat, while acknowledging that parts of the township had been included within a panchayat area as a result of "some error". He also promised that the "error" would be rectified before the upcoming panchayat polls.

Despite prior assurances of exclusion from Panchayat jurisdiction, the Panchayat polls were being held in Newtown. This led to discontent amongst a section of residents of Newtown as they felt that they were wrongfully being "labelled" as "villagers". The Newtown Forum demanded that the township be taken out of the jurisdiction of panchayats. The Forum, in this end, launched a campaign to boycott the polls - they put up hoardings and banners, blocked a few roads and even collected signatures of 12,000 voters in support of the cause.

== Education ==
=== Colleges and universities ===
Some of the educational and training institutes that are setting up their campuses in New Town:

- University of Engineering & Management, Kolkata
- Amity University Kolkata
- Presidency University (New Town campus)
- St. Xaviers University
- IIT Kharagpur Research Park
- Aliah University
- Institute of Cost Accountants of India
- Indian Institute of Social Welfare and Business Management
- Institute of Chartered Accountants of India
- Ramakrishna Mission Centre of Excellence
- Belle Vue Nursing College
- Sister Nivedita University
- West Bengal Power Development Corporation (WBPDCL) Training Institute
- Techno India
- West Bengal Judicial Academy

=== Schools ===
For the children, to study up to the 12th standard, New Town also houses many schools:

- Narayana School New Town
- Delhi Public School Megacity
- Delhi Public School Newtown
- The Newtown School
- IEM Public School
- Bodhicariya Senior Secondary School
- Sri Chaitanya techno school

== Sports ==
AIFF National Center of Excellence is a "state of art" football complex which includes India's first ever roof top pitch. The sports complex is spread across 15 Acres and built with an investment of ₹200 crores.

Cricket Association of Bengal is building an international cricket stadium in New Town. In 2022, CAB bought a 14 Acres plot with ₹30 Crore.

== See also ==
- Satellite city
- Biswa Bangla Gate
- Eco Park
- Durga Angan
