= Movieland Wax Museum =

Former tourist attraction in Buena Park, California

Coordinates: 33°51′04″N 117°59′56″W

The Movieland Wax Museum was the largest wax museum in the United States with over 300 wax figures in 150 sets. Located in Buena Park, California, it was for decades one of the most popular wax museums in the United States. It was located north of Knott's Berry Farm on Beach Boulevard (SR 39). It operated from 1962 to 2005.

== History ==
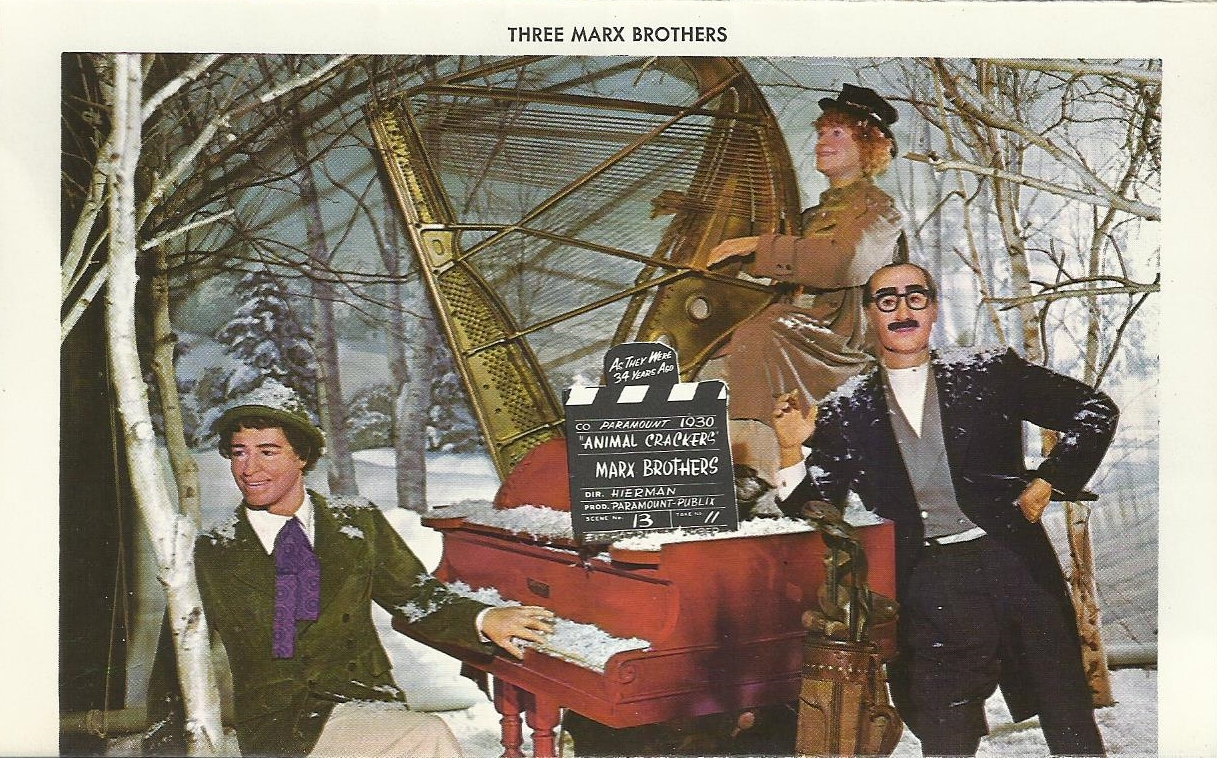
Movieland Wax Museum Postcard

Allen H. Parkinson founded the museum on May 4, 1962, after he was inspired by a visit to the Madame Tussaud's wax museum in London. The opening ceremony was attended by silent film actress Mary Pickford, who dedicated the museum. The project cost $1,500,000. Parkinson sold the museum to the Six Flags Corporation in 1970.

One of the earliest sculptors commissioned by Allen Parkinson to produce these real-sized hyper-realist wax figures in 1960 was the Spanish sculptor Antonio Ballester Vilaseca. He was responsible for the figures of Clark Gable, Leslie Howard, David Niven, Hattie McDaniel, Olivia de Havilland, Natalie Wood, Vivien Leigh, Charlton Heston, Gene Kelly, and Robert Stack, as well as the sets Don Quixote and Sancho, Miguel Angel's David, Leonardo da Vinci, and a full-bodied Gioconda.

In 1975, Six Flags opened a Movieland Wax Museum clone called "Stars Hall of Fame" in Orlando, Florida, located near the intersection of the Bee-Line Expressway (SR 528) and Interstate 4, close to SeaWorld Orlando and just north of Walt Disney World. However, in 1984 after a drop in attendance, the Florida museum was closed and sold to the publisher Harcourt Brace Jovanovich. Having no interest in the museum but an interest in the land alone, Harcourt sold off the exhibits to the American Musical Academy of Arts Association and turned the property into a showroom for the company's educational materials.

In April 1985, the Six Flags Corporation sold the California-based Movieland Wax Museum to Fong & Paul Associates, the owners of the world famous Wax Museum at Fisherman's Wharf in San Francisco.

In the museum's heyday, several actors and actresses attended the unveilings of their wax likenesses, and even went so far as to donate costumes to be worn by their likenesses, along with sets replicated from well-known movie scenes. Movie themes and sound effects also added to the authenticity of the museum. A movie clapperboard on each set included the name of the wax figures and facts about the movie, props, costume, and the person whom the wax figure was modeled on.

The museum was featured in a 1990 episode of the PBS children's television series Reading Rainbow, where the program's host, LeVar Burton, checked out his wax likeness displayed there.

On August 19, 2002, the museum's founder, Allen Parkinson, died from natural causes at 83 years old in his Rhode Island home.

On October 31, 2005, after forty-three years in business and 10 million visitors, Movieland went out of business. The reason for its closure was because of declining visitors and revenue.

Many of the wax figures and sets from the Movieland Wax Museum were auctioned off in March 2006.

The Movieland Wax Museum property was purchased by the City of Buena Park in May 2007. In 2013 the city leased the property to Premier Exhibitions for display of RMS Titanic relics and its Bodies: The Exhibition.

In March 2015, it was announced that the city of Buena Park had approved plans to convert the Movieland property into a Butterfly Palladium that would "feature the sanctuary for butterflies, hummingbirds, bees and other wildlife, an aquarium with jellyfish, a 3D movie theater, a cafe and a retail shop."

In October 2016, the main Movieland Wax Museum building was torn down to make way for retail space. On July 31, 2018, the tall tower sign that was the tallest sign in Orange County was removed.

The former Starlite Gift Shop in front of the museum is now a Starbucks Coffee.

As of 2019, the construction on the retail space has been stalled by a legal battle in which the City of Buena Park had filed a lawsuit to its client, Butterfly Pavilion LLC.

== Figures displayed ==
- Abbott and Costello from Who's on First?
- Julie Andrews from Mary Poppins
- Ed Asner as Lou Grant
- Fred Astaire and Ginger Rogers from Top Hat
- Lucille Ball
- Brigitte Bardot
- Roseanne Barr from Roseanne
- Halle Berry
- the cast of The Beverly Hillbillies
- Linda Blair from The Exorcist
- Humphrey Bogart and Katharine Hepburn from The African Queen
- Marlon Brando from The Godfather
- Ricou Browning as Gill-man from Creature from the Black Lagoon
- Yul Brynner and Deborah Kerr from The King and I
- Carol Burnett
- George Burns
- Raymond Burr
- LeVar Burton from Reading Rainbow
- George W. Bush
- James Cagney
- Cantinflas from If I Were a Congressman
- Jim Carrey from Ace Ventura: Pet Detective
- Johnny Carson
- Jackie Chan
- Lon Chaney as The Phantom of the Opera
- Lon Chaney Jr. as The Wolf Man
- Charlie Chaplin from The Gold Rush
- Cher
- Dick Clark
- Roy Clark
- Chuck Connors
- Gary Cooper
- Kevin Costner from Dances with Wolves
- Tom Cruise
- Macaulay Culkin from Home Alone
- Billy Ray Cyrus
- Bette Davis from All About Eve
- Geena Davis
- Sammy Davis Jr.
- James Dean from Rebel Without a Cause
- Leonardo DiCaprio and Kate Winslet from Titanic
- Kirk Douglas as Spartacus
- Clint Eastwood
- Elvira
- Gloria Estefan
- W. C. Fields from Poppy
- Harrison Ford from Indiana Jones
- Michael J. Fox from Back to the Future
- Redd Foxx and LaWanda Page from Sanford and Son
- Clark Gable and Vivien Leigh from Gone with the Wind
- Eva Gabor and Eddie Albert from Green Acres
- Judy Garland, Ray Bolger, Bert Lahr, and Jack Haley from The Wizard of Oz
- Sarah Michelle Gellar
- Mel Gibson from Mad Max
- John Gilbert and Greta Garbo from Queen Christina
- Whoopi Goldberg from Sister Act
- Gene Hackman, Ernest Borgnine, Stella Stevens, Carol Lynley and Red Buttons from The Poseidon Adventure
- Gunnar Hansen as Leatherface from The Texas Chain Saw Massacre
- Jean Harlow from Dinner at Eight
- Charlton Heston and Stephen Boyd from Ben-Hur
- Hulk Hogan
- Bob Hope and Bing Crosby from Road to Bali
- Hugh Jackman as Wolverine
- Michael Jackson
- Boris Karloff from Frankenstein
- Buster Keaton
- Gene Kelly from Singin' in the Rain
- Alan Ladd from Shane
- Michael Landon, Lorne Greene and Dan Blocker from Bonanza
- Charles Laughton as Henry VIII
- Laurel and Hardy
- Bruce Lee from Enter the Dragon
- John Lennon
- Jerry Lewis and Eddie Murphy from The Nutty Professor
- Liberace
- The Little Rascals
- Little Richard
- Jennifer Lopez from Maid in Manhattan
- Sophia Loren from Two Women
- Bela Lugosi as Dracula
- Fred MacMurray from The Absent-Minded Professor
- Madonna
- Ricky Martin
- The Marx Brothers
- Metropolis Woman from Metropolis
- Bette Midler
- Liza Minnelli
- Tom Mix from Rustlers' Roundup
- Marilyn Monroe
- Dudley Moore from Arthur
- Roger Moore as James Bond
- Jack Nicholson from The Shining
- Leslie Nielsen from Naked Gun 33 1/3: The Final Insult
- Chuck Norris from The Delta Force
- Mary-Kate and Ashley Olsen
- Donny and Marie Osmond
- Anthony Perkins from Psycho
- Mary Pickford and Douglas Fairbanks from The Taming of the Shrew
- Elvis Presley
- Vincent Price from House of Wax
- Ronald Reagan from Tennessee's Partner
- Robert Redford and Paul Newman from Butch Cassidy and the Sundance Kid
- Christopher Reeve as Superman
- Keanu Reeves from The Matrix
- Debbie Reynolds from The Singing Nun
- Julia Roberts
- Cliff Robertson from PT 109
- Edward G. Robinson from Little Caesar
- Roy Rogers from Don’t Fence Me In
- Dan Rowan and Dick Martin
- Arnold Schwarzenegger as The Terminator
- George C. Scott as George S. Patton
- Tom Selleck
- Omar Sharif, Julie Christie and Rod Steiger from Doctor Zhivago
- Nancy Sinatra from The Wild Angels
- Britney Spears
- Sylvester Stallone as Rocky Balboa
- the cast of Star Trek
- James Stewart from Rear Window
- Barbra Streisand from Hello, Dolly!
- Mr. T
- Elizabeth Taylor from Cleopatra
- Robert Taylor and Hedy Lamarr from Lady of the Tropics
- Shirley Temple from Bright Eyes
- The Three Stooges
- John Travolta
- Rudolph Valentino
- John Wayne from Hondo
- Mae West from She Done Him Wrong
- Robin Williams as Mrs. Doubtfire
- Bruce Willis
- Jonathan Winters
- Catherine Zeta-Jones

== The Starprint Gallery ==
The Starprint Gallery was located at the outside of the Movieland Wax Museum, and it featured handprints and footprints of celebrities in cement, dating from the early 1980s. It had a similar concept to the cement handprints at the front of Grauman's Chinese Theater in nearby Hollywood. When the museum closed, the prints still existed until the museum's demolition in 2016. The celebrities featured on the gallery include:

- Eddie Albert
- June Allyson
- Loni Anderson
- Gene Autry
- Ed Asner
- Frankie Avalon
- Roger Barkley
- Billy Barty
- Georg Stanford Brown
- Carol Burnett
- LeVar Burton
- Ray Charles
- Cher
- Billy Ray Cyrus
- Mac Davis
- Phyllis Diller
- James Doohan
- Ja'Net DuBois
- Elvira
- Gloria Estefan
- Douglas Fairbanks Jr.
- Mike Farrell
- Lou Ferrigno
- Peter Fonda
- Eva Gabor
- Beverly Garland
- George Gobel
- Louis Gossett Jr.
- Alex Haley
- Dorian Harewood
- DeForest Kelley
- Persis Khambatta
- Jack Klugman
- Dorothy Lamour
- Liberace
- Al Lohman
- Marcel Marceau
- Johnny Mathis
- Dudley Moore
- Bob Newhart
- Gary Owens
- Brock Peters
- Vincent Price
- Tom Selleck
- Beverly Todd
- Tina Turner
- Herve Villechaize
- Burt Ward
- Dennis Weaver
- Adam West
- Roger Williams
