= Panoptikum Hamburg =

Wax museum in Hamburg, Germany

Coordinates: 53°32′58″N 9°58′00″E

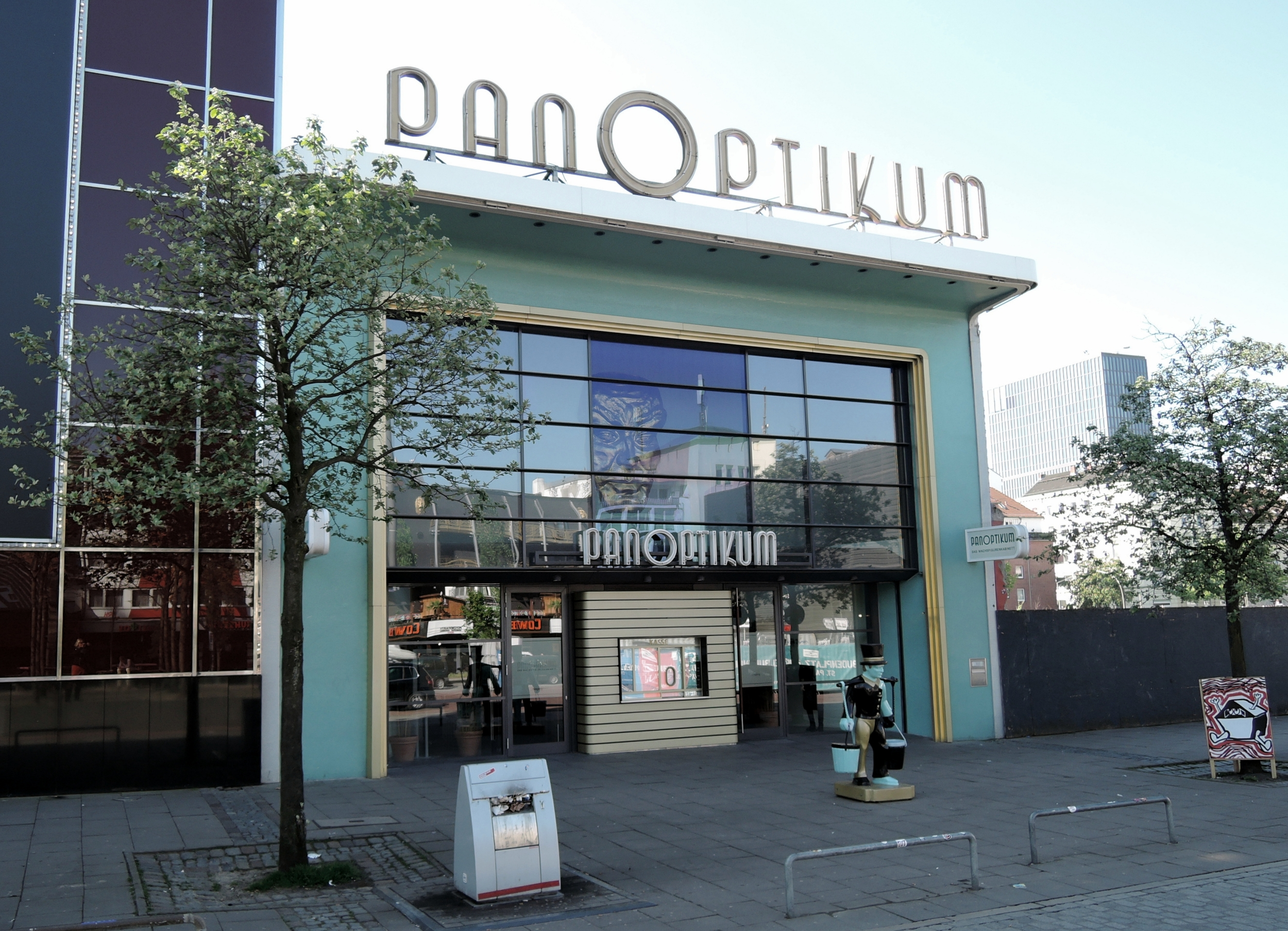
- Established: 1879; 146 years ago
- Location: Spielbudenplatz 3, D-20359 Hamburg, Germany
- Type: Wax museum
- Founder: Friedrich Hermann Faerber
- Website: panoptikum.de

The Panoptikum Hamburg is a wax museum in Hamburg, Germany. Founded in 1879 by Friedrich Hermann Faerber, it is the country's oldest wax museum. Each wax figure takes up to two years and €40,000 to complete. According to its owners, the Panoptikum receives around 200,000 visitors annually as of 2018.
