= Mother's Wax Museum =

Museum in New Town, West Bengal, India

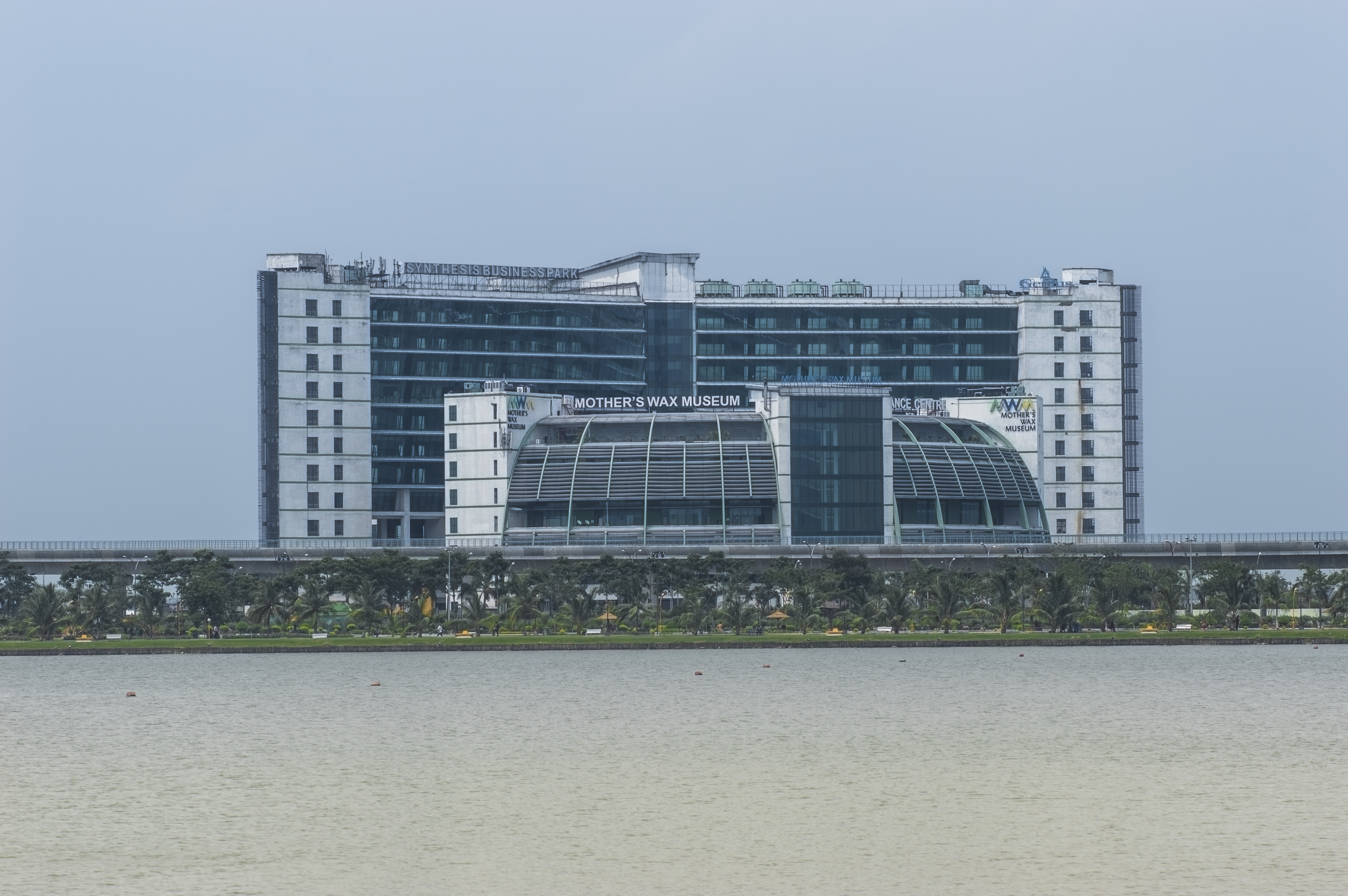
- Established: 10 November 2014 (11 years ago)
- Location: New Town, Greater Kolkata, West Bengal, India
- Website: www.motherswaxmuseum.in

Mother's Wax Museum is a wax museum located in Action Area – II of New Town, Kolkata, India on the 5th and 6th floors of the West Bengal Housing Infrastructure Development Corporation building. Established in November 2014, it contains wax statues of more than 50 personalities, including statues of Bollywood actors Amitabh Bachchan, Shah Rukh Khan and Salman Khan. The museum has been named after Mother Teresa.

== Featured wax sculptures ==
=== Sports ===
- Lionel Messi
- Diego Maradona
- Sourav Ganguly
- Kapil Dev
- Sachin Tendulkar
- Virat Kohli
- David Beckham

=== Political ===
- B. R. Ambedkar
- Netaji Subhas Chandra Bose
- Mahatma Gandhi
- Pranab Mukherjee
- Sheikh Mujibur Rahman

=== Spirituality ===
- Ramakrishna
- Sarada Devi
- Swami Vivekananda
- Sri Aurobindo

=== Social ===
- Raja Rammohan Roy
- Sister Nivedita (presently removed)
- Mother Teresa

=== Literature ===
- Rabindranath Tagore
- Iswar Chandra Vidyasagar
- Sarat Chandra Chatterjee
- Kazi Nazrul Islam

=== Science ===
- Jagadish Chandra Bose
- Satyendranath Bose
- A. P. J. Abdul Kalam
- Albert Einstein

=== Music ===
- Manna Dey
- Pandit Ravi Shankar
- Hemanta Mukherjee
- Kishore Kumar
- Lata Mangeshkar
- Michael Jackson
- Elvis Presley
- Justin Timberlake
- Ariana Grande

=== Bollywood ===
- Amitabh Bachchan
- Mithun Chakraborty
- Shah Rukh Khan
- Salman Khan (as Inspector Chulbul Pandey)
- Priyanka Chopra
- Varun Dhawan
- Aishwarya Rai Bachchan
- Ranveer Singh

=== Tollywood ===
- Uttam Kumar (presently removed)
- Suchitra Sen (presently removed)
- Prabhas (as Baahubali) (presently removed)
- Anushka Shetty (as Devasena) (presently removed)
- Satyajit Ray

=== Hollywood ===
- Tom Cruise
- Brad Pitt
- Angelina Jolie
- Bruce Willis
- Nicole Kidman
- Daniel Craig
- Julia Roberts
- Zac Efron
- Marilyn Monroe
- Bruce Lee
- Audrey Hepburn
- Heath Ledger (presently removed)
- Johnny Depp (as Captain Jack Sparrow)
- Harrison Ford (as Indiana Jones)
- Rowan Atkinson (as Mr. Bean)
- Daniel Radcliffe (as Harry Potter)

=== Fictional Characters ===
- Doraemon
- Iron Man
- Shrek
- Spider-Man
