= Durga Angan =

- দূর্গা অঙ্গন

Religion
- Affiliation: Hinduism
- District: North 24 Parganas
- Deity: Durga
- Festival: Durga Puja
- Status: Under-Construction

Location
- Location: New Town, Kolkata
- State: West Bengal
- Country: India

Architecture
- Creator: HIDCO
- Groundbreaking: 2025

Specifications
- Height (max): 54 metres (177 ft)
- Site area: 17.28 acres (6.99 ha)

The Durga Angan at New Town, is an under-construction Hindu temple dedicated to Durga, located in the North 24 Parganas district, West Bengal, India. The temple enshrines the deity Durga, a form of Shakti. The foundation stone of the temple was laid on 29 December 2025.

The 'Durga Angan' will be constructed under the supervision of HIDCO. The estimated cost of the construction is around Rs 261.99 crore.

There will be a museum in the Durga Angan. It is planned to house some of the best artefacts associated with Durga Puja. It will showcase various aspects of Bengal's heritage and culture.

== Deities ==
The main goddess of the temple is Durga, and the temple is named after her. Shiva, Lakshmi, Ganesha, Saraswati and Kartik are also enshrined in separate temples here.
