= Wax museum =

Museum displaying a collection of wax representations of famous people

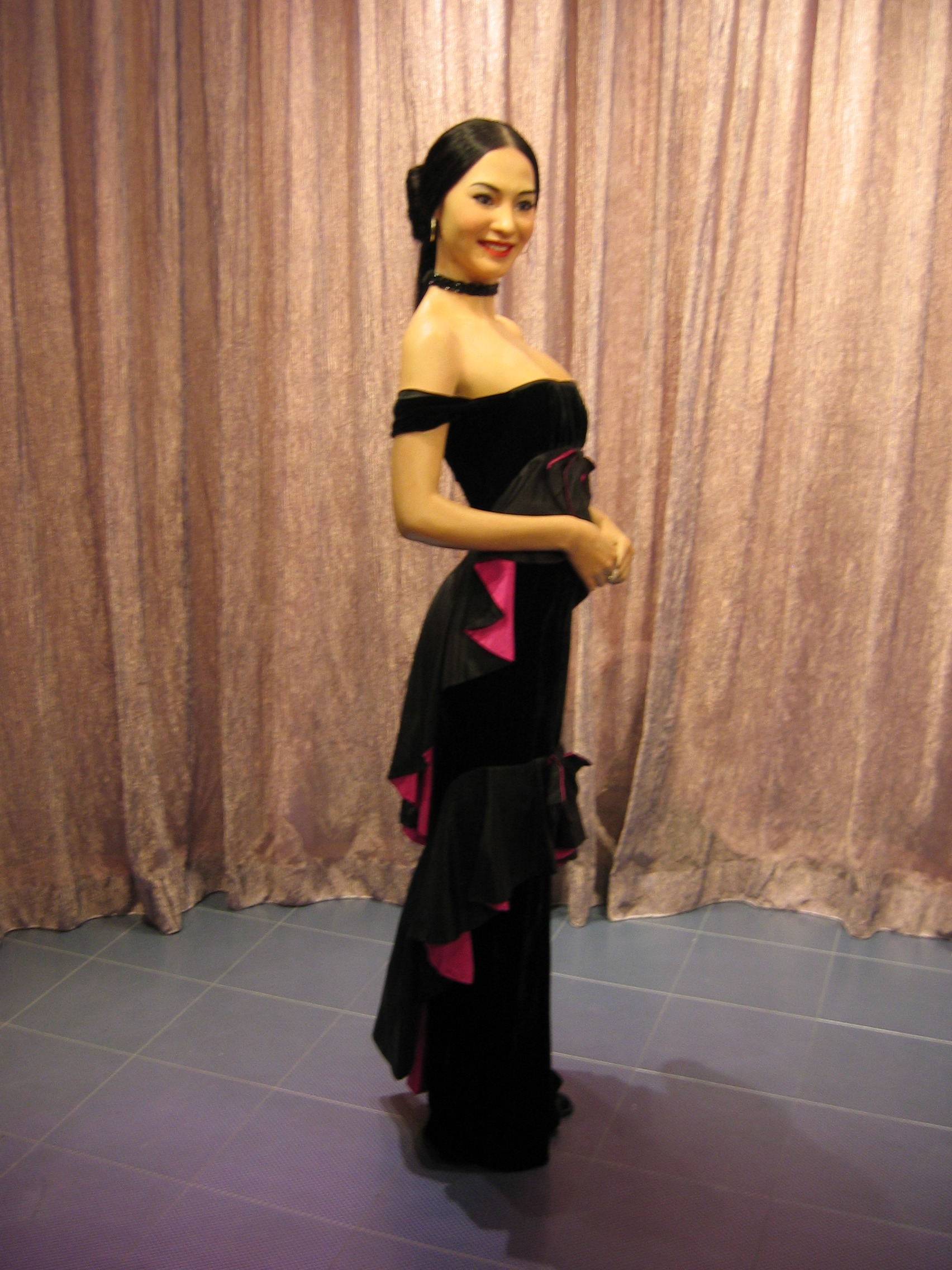
A modern wax sculpture of Cecilia Cheung at Madame Tussauds Hong Kong.

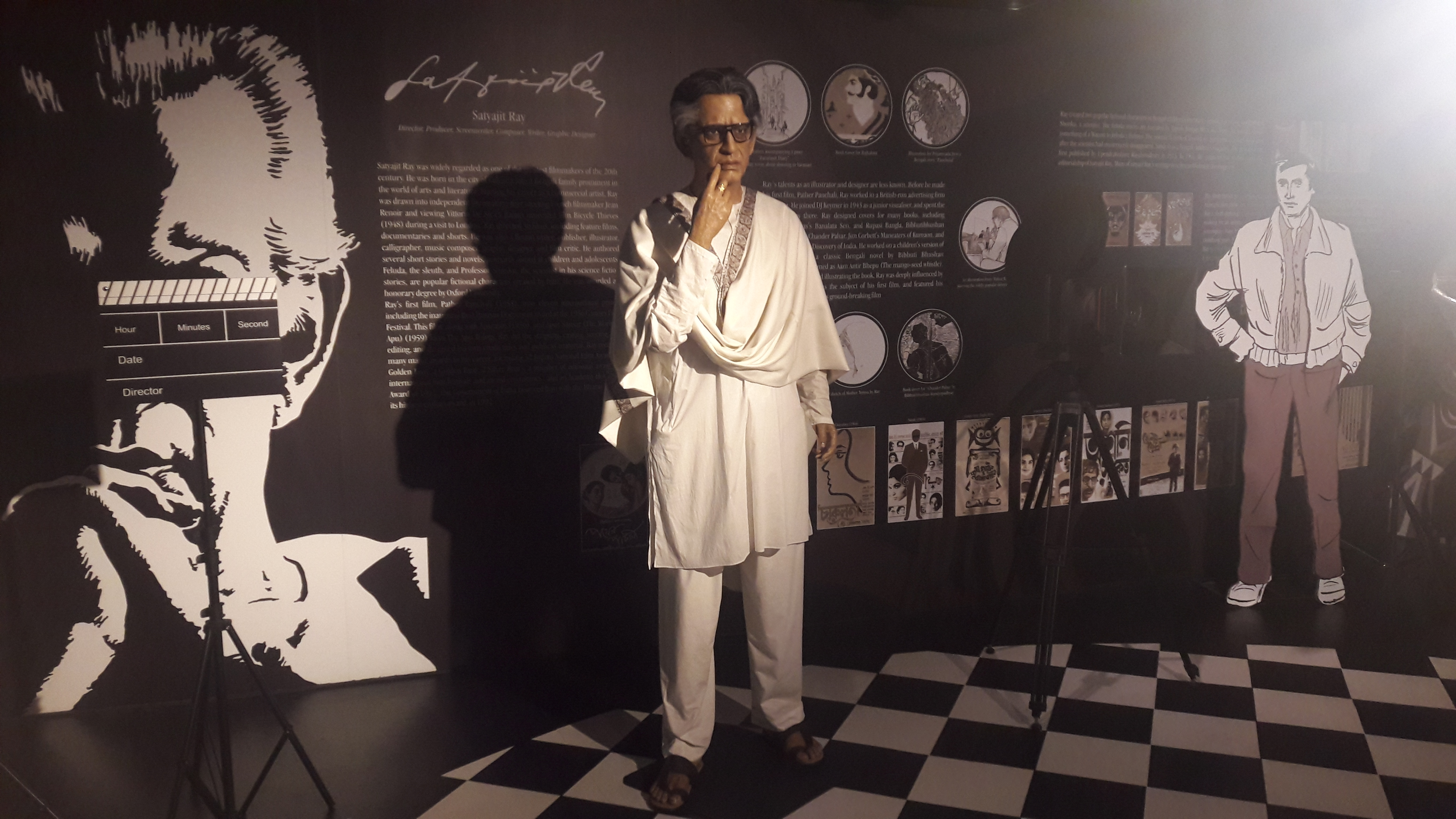
Satyajit Ray at Mother's Wax Museum, Kolkata.

A wax museum or waxworks usually consists of a collection of wax sculptures representing famous people from history and contemporary personalities exhibited in lifelike poses, wearing real clothes.

Some wax museums have a special section dubbed the "Chamber of Horrors", in which the more grisly exhibits are displayed. Some collections are more specialized, as, for example, collections of wax medical models once used for training medical professionals. Many museums or displays in historical houses that are not wax museums as such use wax figures as part of their displays. The origin of wax museums goes back to the early 18th century at least, and wax funeral effigies of royalty and some other figures exhibited by their tombs had essentially been tourist attractions well before that.

== History before 1800 ==
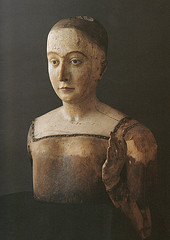
The funeral effigy (without clothes) of Elizabeth of York, mother of King Henry VIII, 1503, Westminster Abbey

The making of life-size wax figures wearing real clothes grew out of the funeral practices of European royalty. In the Middle Ages it was the habit to carry the corpse, fully dressed, on top of the coffin at royal funerals, but this sometimes had unfortunate consequences in hot weather, and the custom of making an effigy in wax for this role grew, again wearing actual clothes so that only the head and hands needed wax models. After the funeral these were often displayed by the tomb or elsewhere in the church, and became a popular attraction for visitors, which it was often necessary to pay to view.

The Westminster Abbey Museum in London has a collection of British royal funeral effigies made of varying materials going back to that of Edward III of England's wooden likeness (died 1377), as well as those of figures such as the naval hero Horatio Nelson, and Frances Stewart, Duchess of Richmond, who also had her parrot stuffed and displayed. From the funeral of Charles II in 1680 they were no longer placed on the coffin but were still made for later display. The effigy of Charles II, open-eyed and standing, was displayed over his tomb until the early 19th century, when all the Westminster effigies were removed from the abbey itself. Nelson's effigy was a pure tourist attraction, commissioned the year after his death in 1805, and his burial not in the Abbey but in St Paul's Cathedral after a government decision that major public figures should in future be buried there. Concerned for their revenue from visitors, the Abbey decided it needed a rival attraction for admirers of Nelson.

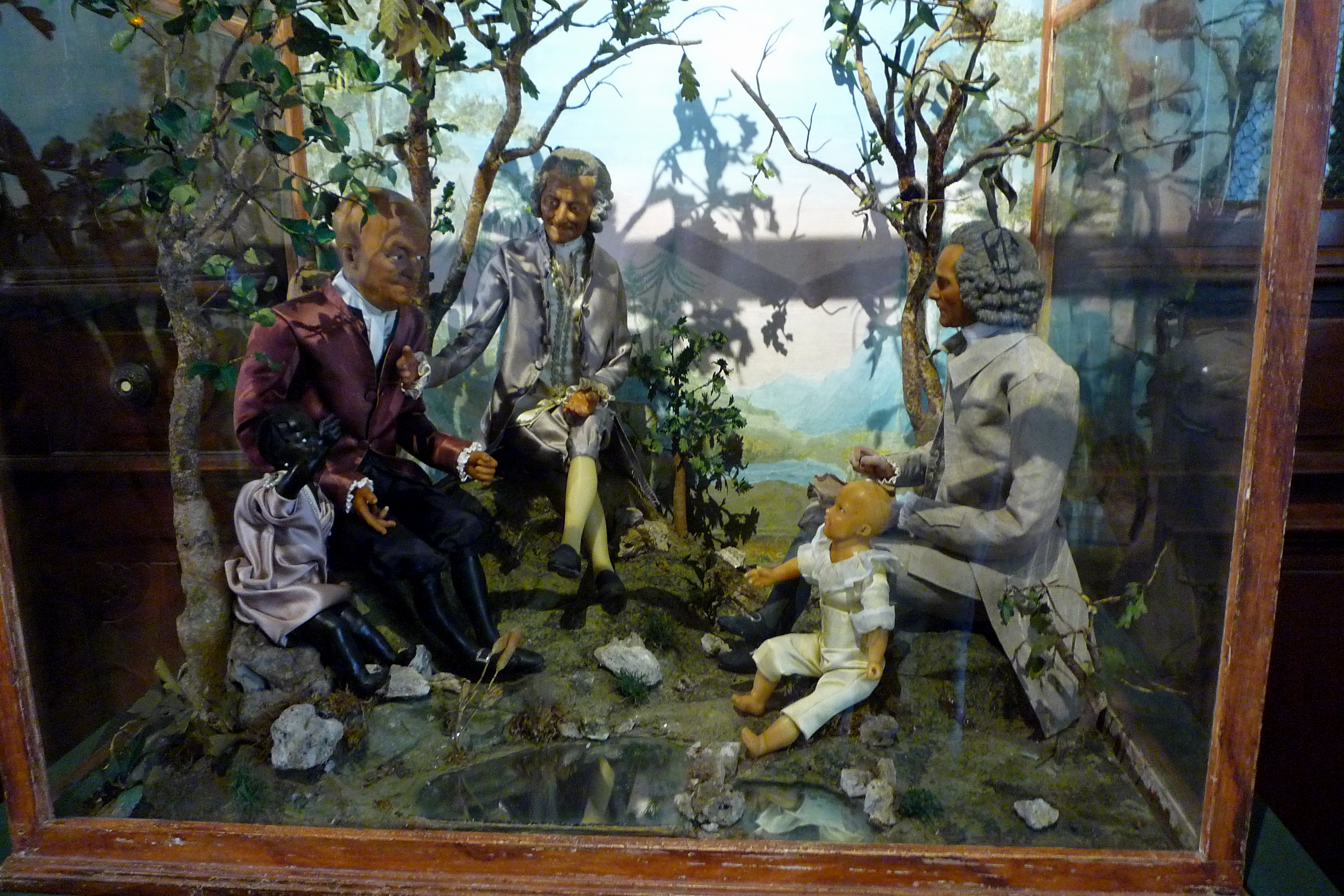
Wax museum in 1792 with the three fathers of the French Revolution, Franklin, Voltaire and Rousseau, installed at Elysium. (musée de la Révolution française)

In European courts including that of France the making of posed wax figures became popular. Antoine Benoist (1632–1717) was a French court painter and sculptor in wax to King Louis XIV. He exhibited forty-three wax figures of the French Royal Circle at his residence in Paris. Thereafter, the king authorized the figurines to be shown throughout France. His work became so highly regarded that James II of England invited him to visit England in 1684. There he executed works of the English king and members of his court. A seated figure of Peter the Great of Russia survives, made by an Italian artist, after the Tsar was impressed by the figures he saw at the Chateau of Versailles. The Danish court painter Johann Salomon Wahl executed figures of the Danish king and queen in about 1740.

The 'Moving Wax Works of the Royal Court of England', a museum or exhibition of 140 life-size figures, some apparently with clockwork moving parts, opened by Mrs Mary in Fleet Street in London was doing excellent business in 1711. Philippe Curtius, waxwork modeller to the French court, opened his Cabinet de Cire as a tourist attraction in Paris in 1770, which remained open until 1802. In 1783 this added a Caverne des Grands Voleurs ("Cave of the Great Thieves"), an early "Chamber of Horrors". He bequeathed his collection to his protégée Marie Tussaud, who during the French Revolution made death masks of the executed royals.

== Notable wax museums ==
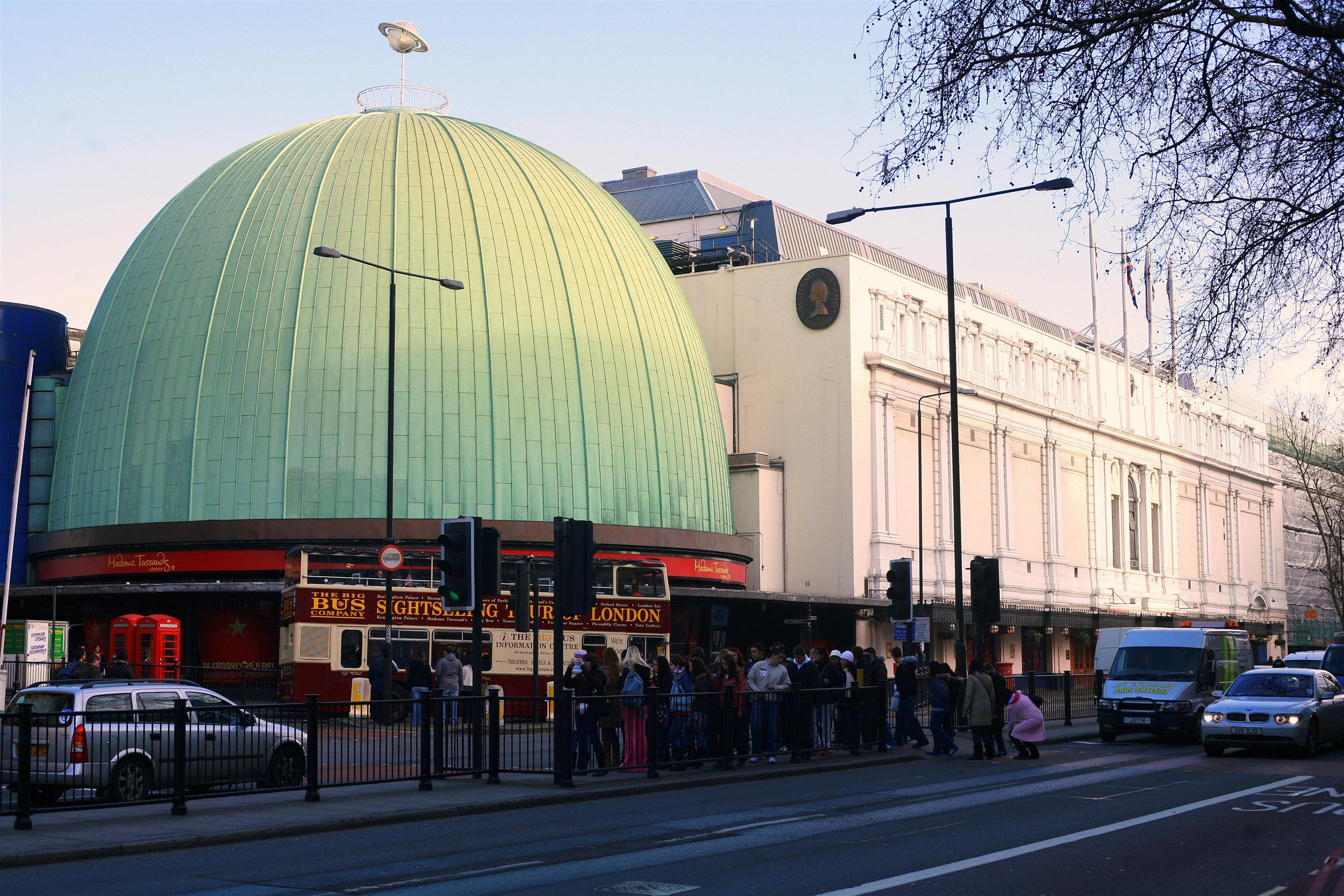
The Madame Tussauds Museum location in London, England

Madame Tussauds, historically associated with London, is the most famous name associated with wax museums, although it was not the earliest wax museum, as is sometimes thought. In 1835 Madame Tussaud established her first permanent exhibition in London's Baker Street. By the late 19th century most large cities had some kind of commercial wax museum, like the Musée Grévin in Paris or the Panoptikum Hamburg, and for a century these remained highly popular. In the late 20th century it became harder for them to compete with other attractions.

Today there are also Madame Tussauds in 22 locations, including Dam Square, Amsterdam; Berlin; Hong Kong; Shanghai; and in the United States: the Venetian Hotel in Las Vegas, Nevada, Times Square in New York City, Washington, D.C., and Hollywood. Madame Tussauds opened its first museum in India at New Delhi in 2017.

Louis Tussaud's wax museum in San Antonio, Texas, is across the street from the historic Alamo Mission. Others are located on the Canadian side of Niagara Falls, and Grand Prairie, Texas.

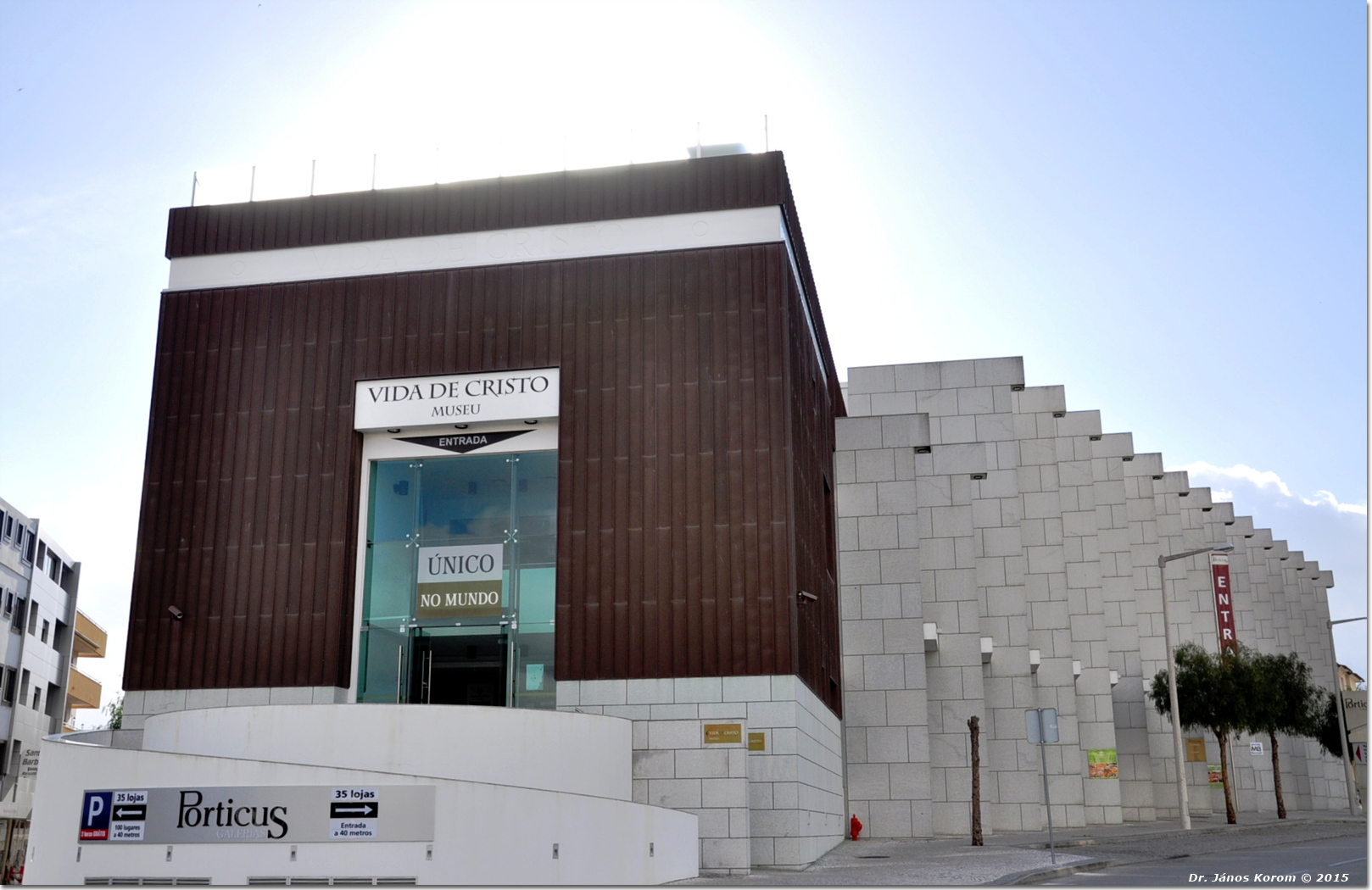
The Life of Christ Museum is located in Fatima, Portugal

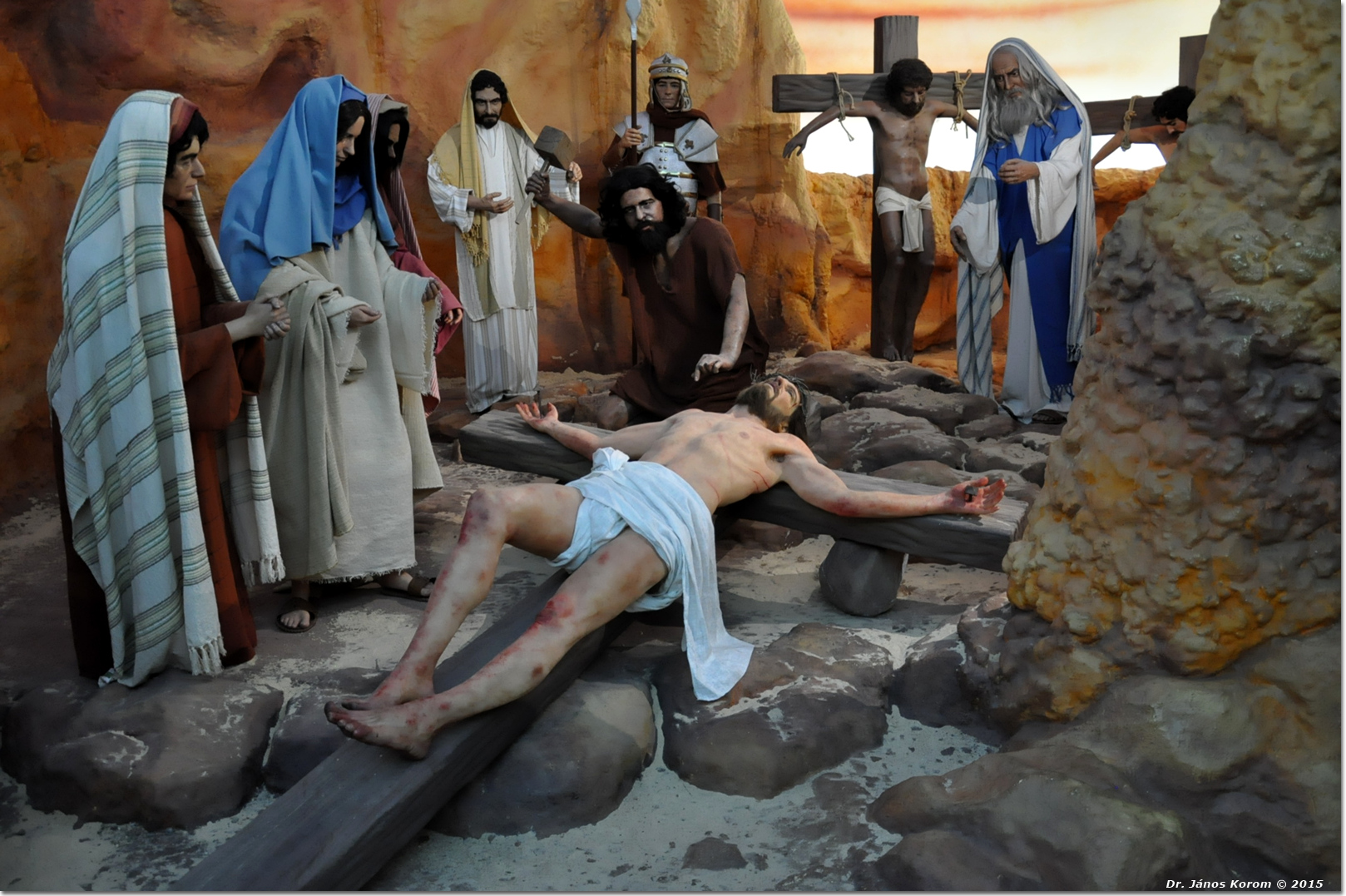
The crucifixion of Jesus scene in the Life of Christ Museum (Fatima)

Among the most notable wax museums is the Life of Christ Museum located in Fatima, the city internationally known for the phenomenon of the apparitions of the Virgin Mary that allegedly occurred in Portugal. Tony Julius, director of the London company that manufactured the wax figures and former collaborator of the Madame Tussauds Museum, considered it the third best wax museum in the world.

The Padre Pio Wax Museum in San Giovanni Rotondo, Italy, is located in the Morcaldi Palace, Via Pirgiano No. 25, and features wax figures depicting some of the defining moments in the life of the stigmatized friar (now Saint) Padre Pio of Pietrelcina. In Italy there are other two popular wax museums: the Rome Wax Museum and the Gazoldo degli Ippoliti Wax Museum.

One of the most popular and famous wax museums in the United States for decades was The Movieland Wax Museum in Buena Park, California, near Knott's Berry Farm. The museum opened in 1962 and through the years added many wax figures of famous show business figures. Several stars attended the unveilings of the wax incarnations and some added their handprints, footprints, and/or signatures in cement there ala Grauman's Chinese Theatre. The museum was profiled on a number of television programs and occasionally referenced on TV dramas given its longtime success as a tourist attraction, no doubt in part due to the close proximity to Knott's Berry Farm and Disneyland. The museum closed its doors on October 31, 2005, after years of dwindling attendance.

A very similar museum occasionally confused with the Movieland Wax Museum is the Hollywood Wax Museum located in Hollywood, California which features almost exclusively figures of movie actors displayed in settings associated with their roles in popular movies. This group of museums includes Hollywood Wax Museum Branson in Branson, Missouri along with Hollywood Wax Museum Pigeon Forge in Pigeon Forge, Tennessee and Hollywood Wax Museum Myrtle Beach in Myrtle Beach, South Carolina. With the original location having been developed in the mid-1960s, this group of museums went against the late 20th century trend of declining wax museum attendance, with the Branson location having undergone a substantial expansion and remodeling in 2008 and 2009 including an animated ride and a mirror maze.

Another popular wax museum is the Musée Conti Wax Museum in New Orleans, Louisiana, which features wax figures portraying the city's history as well as a "Haunted Dungeon" section of wax figures of famous characters from horror films and literature. This museum is now closed and the Conti building was converted into condos. The museum was rumored to reopen at Jazzland theme park some indefinite date in the future but that park itself closed before long. Several of the wax figures are now on display in Darrow, Louisiana at The Great River Road Museum near Houmas House.

Another popular wax museum in the U.S. is the Wax Museum at Fisherman's Wharf in San Francisco, California.

BibleWalk is a Christian wax museum in Mansfield, Ohio. It has received attention for its use of celebrity wax figures in its religious scenes, originally a cost-saving measure when new wax figures were deemed too expensive.

The Royal London Wax Museum was open in downtown Victoria, British Columbia, Canada, from 1970 to 2010 in the Steamship Terminal building, it featured "royalty to rogues and the renowned". It was forced to close when the building required seismic upgrades.

The National Wax Museum in Dublin, Ireland, is a wax museum which hosts well over a hundred figures. For many years it has had only one sculptor, PJ Heraty, who continued producing figures even while the museum was closed. Meanwhile, it could be re-opened at a new location. During the last few years some other new wax museums are starting around the world. In 2009 Dreamland Wax Museum opened in Gramado, in the south of Brazil.

The National Presidential Wax Museum in Keystone, South Dakota is the only wax museum in the world to feature every U.S. president. Their exhibits also include other notable figures from history such as General George Custer, Alexander Graham Bell, Thomas Edison, and Sitting Bull. Originally created by the famed sculptor Katherine Stubergh, the museum includes death and life masks of notable Hollywood celebrities including Mae West and Sid Grauman. Their most revered exhibit is a depiction of George W. Bush standing on the rubble of the World Trade Center with NYFD fireman Bob Beckwith following the attacks on September 11, 2001.

India's first wax museum opened in December 2005 in Kanyakumari. Now located to Kanyakumari Railway Station it contains wax statues of celebrities at Multi Functional Complex Kanyakumari. The biggest wax museum in India named Mother's Wax Museum was opened in November 2014 in New Town, Kolkata. Another branch opened in July 2008 at the historical site of Old Goa with a collection of religious statues.

== Depictions ==
- Mystery of the Wax Museum
- House of Wax
- Museo del horror
- Terror in the Wax Museum
- Waxwork
- House of Wax

== See also ==
- Wax sculpture
