= Hollywood Wax Museum Myrtle Beach =

Hollywood Wax Museum (Myrtle Beach, SC)
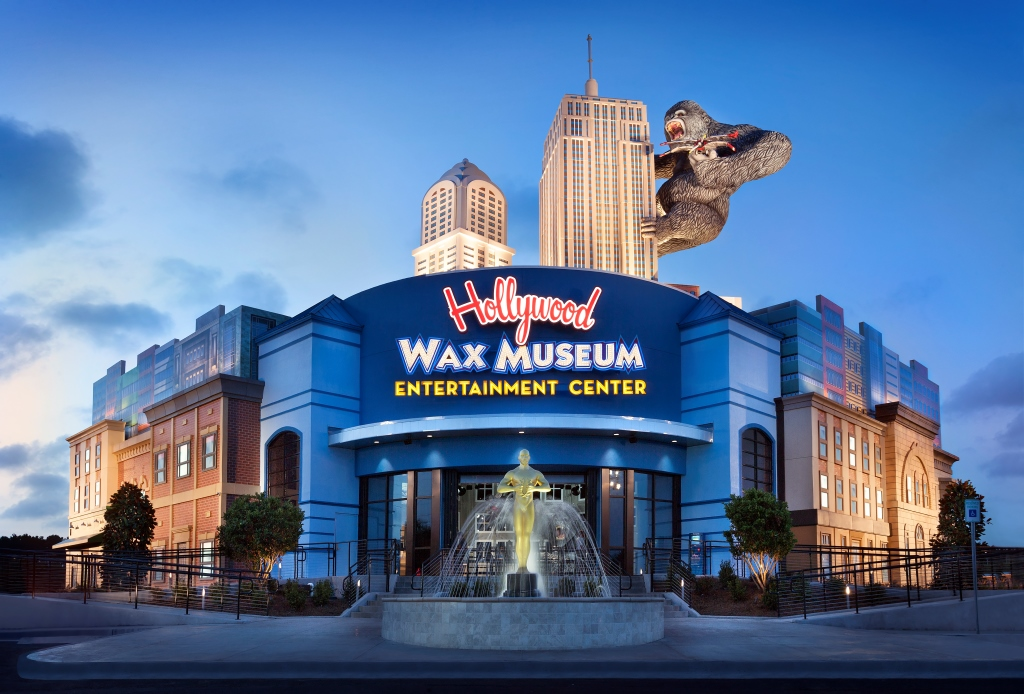
- Established: June 14, 2014
- Location: 1808 21st Ave. N., Unit A, Myrtle Beach, South Carolina
- Coordinates: 33.717260°N 78.891304°W
- Type: Wax museum
- Website: http://hollywoodwaxmuseum.com/

The Hollywood Wax Museum in Myrtle Beach, South Carolina is the fourth wax museum owned and operated by descendants of Spoony Singh.

Opened on June 14, 2014, it is located at 21st Avenue North and U.S. 17 Bypass as a part of Broadway at the Beach. It features replicas of United States celebrities in film, television and music, as well as a NASCAR set and a section devoted to horror villains.

The building is a tribute to the U.S. film industry and includes the 35-foot-tall Great Ape of Myrtle Beach climbing the Empire State Building as a tribute to King Kong (1933 film)

== Overview ==
The museum is part of the Hollywood Wax Museum Entertainment Center. Other attractions in the same facility include Hannah’s Maze of Mirrors and Outbreak – Dread the Undead

== Sets and exhibitions ==
Wax figures and sets continue to change regularly. There is also a prop vault and a laser maze. The Hollywood Wax Museum also has a gift shop, which offers celebrity souvenirs and memorabilia like award statues.

== Other locations ==
The original Hollywood Wax Museum in Hollywood, California, was opened in 1965. The Hollywood Wax Museum Branson in Branson, Missouri, was opened in April 1996, and the Hollywood Wax Museum Pigeon Forge in Pigeon Forge, Tennessee, opened in May 2012.

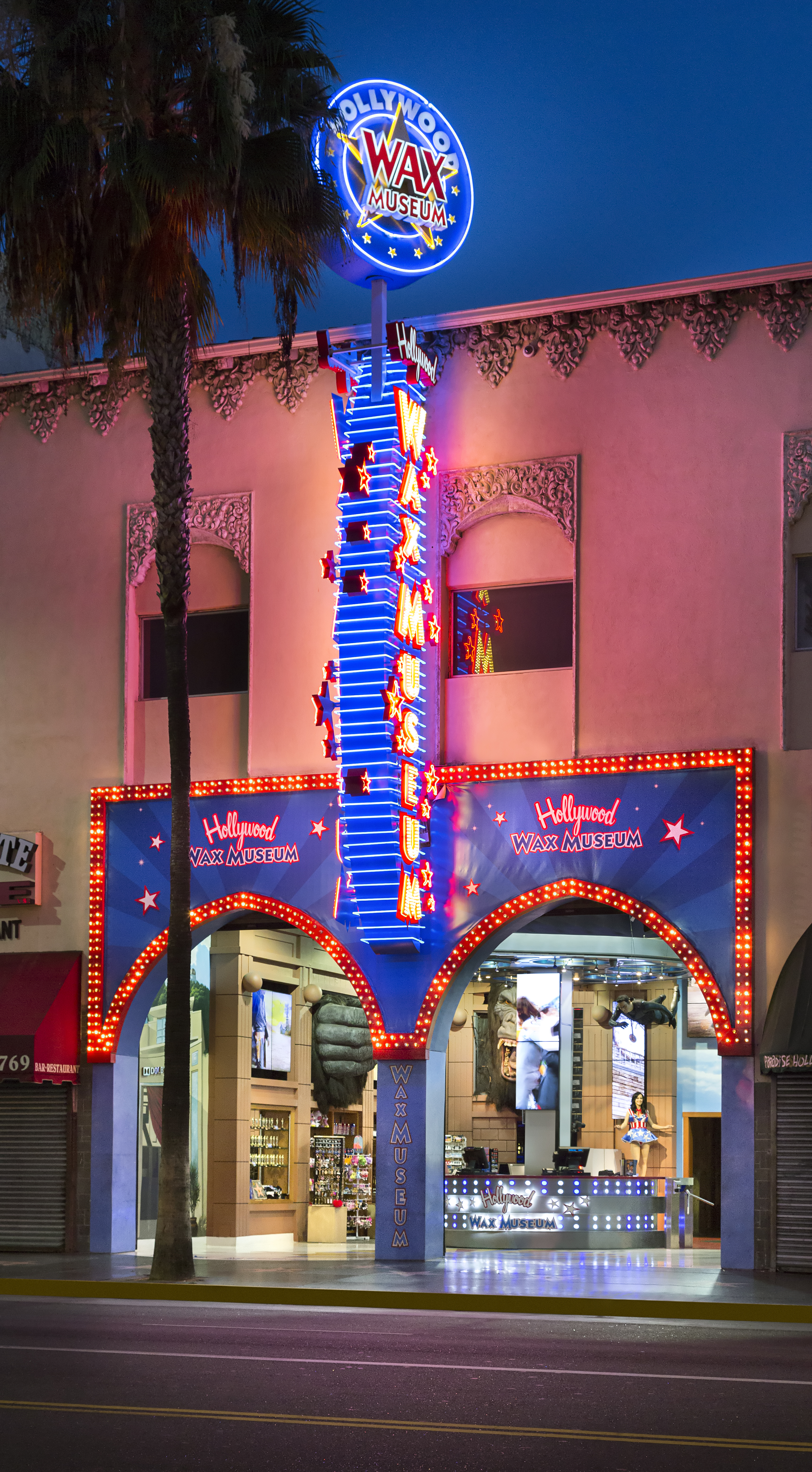
Hollywood Wax Museum in Hollywood, CA

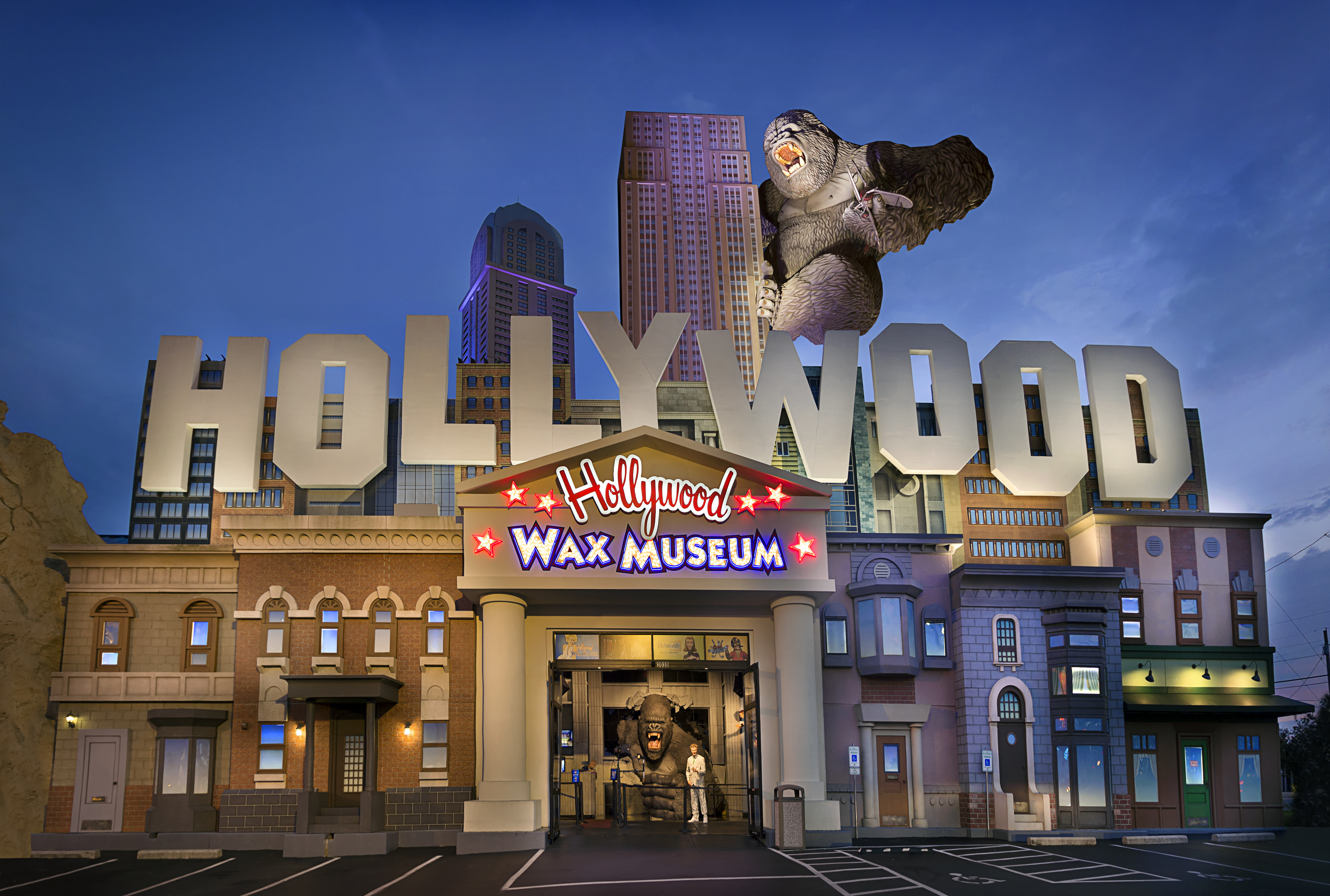
Hollywood Wax Museum Branson in Branson, MO

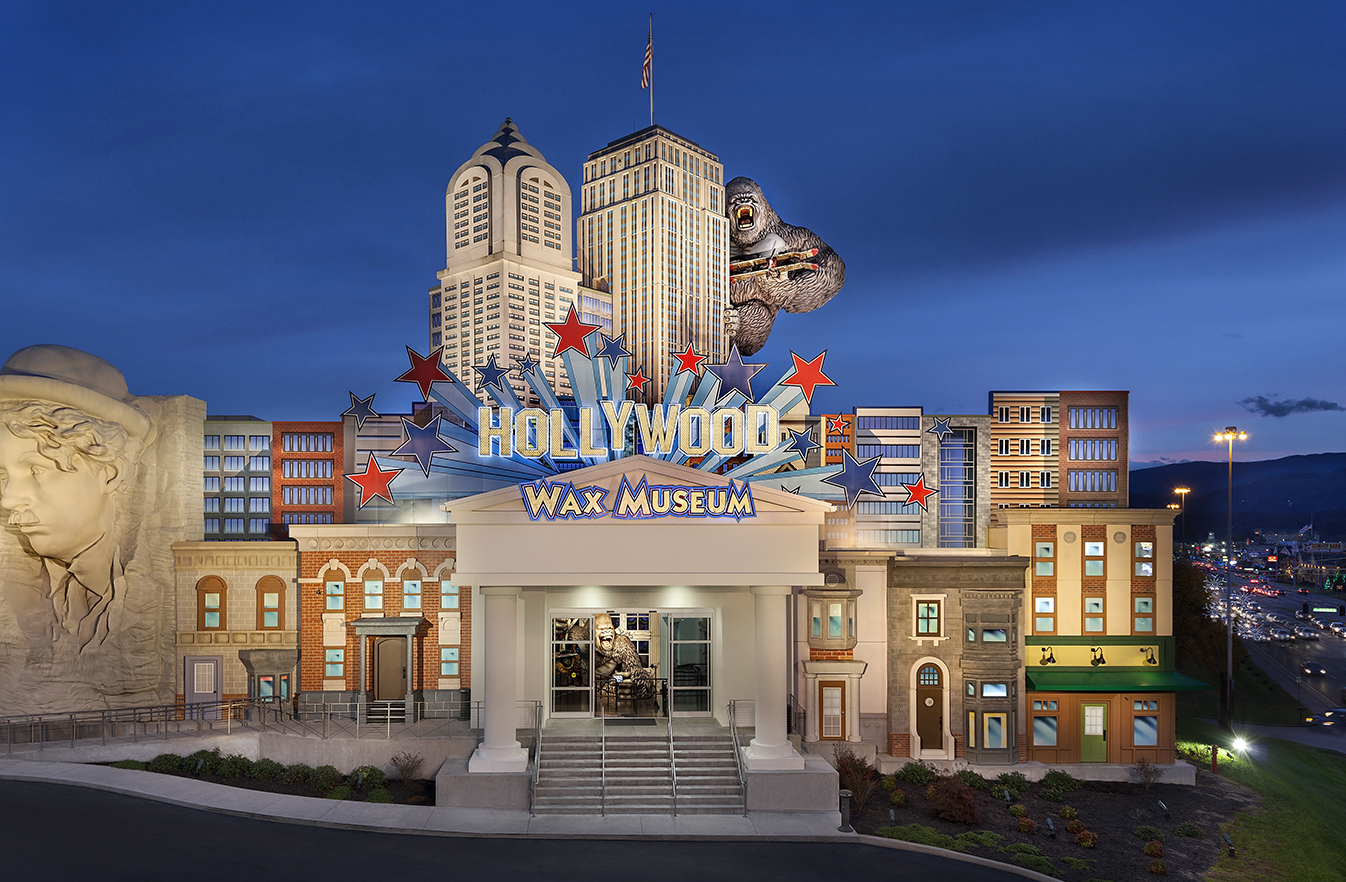
Hollywood Wax Museum Pigeon Forge in Pigeon Forge, TN
