= Hollywood Storage Center of Thousand Oaks =

Coordinates: 34.19164°N 118.94846°W

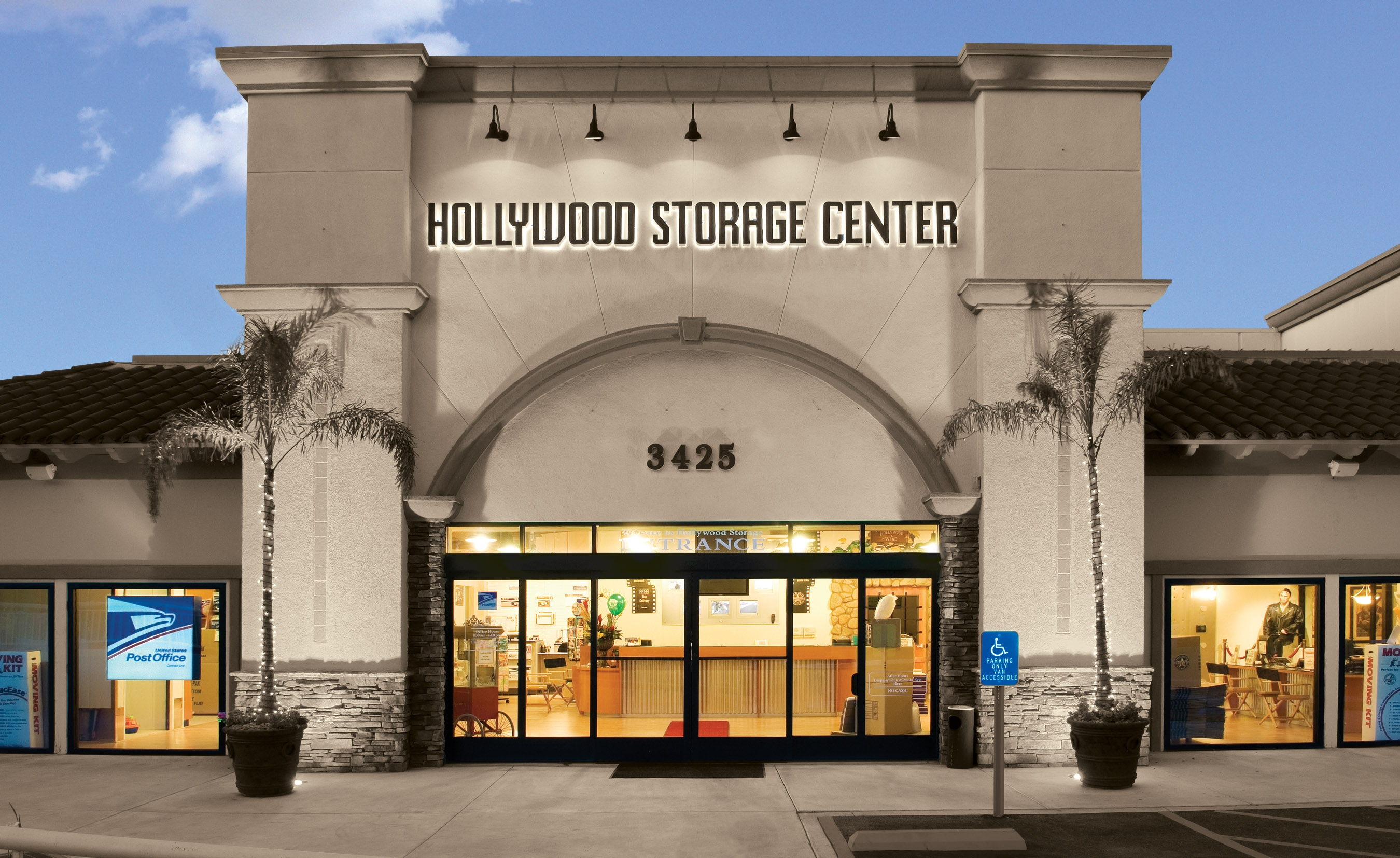
- Company type: Self storage
- Founded: 1979
- Headquarters: 3425 Old Conejo Rd, Unit A Newbury Park, California, 91320
- Website: http://www.hollywoodstoragecenter.com/

The Hollywood Storage Center of Thousand Oaks is a self storage and mini storage business located in Newbury Park, California. Services include self-storage, climate controlled storage, wine storage, safety deposit boxes, and vault storage. The storage company (originally called Thousand Oaks Self Storage) was founded by Spoony Singh, the founder of the Hollywood Wax Museum, in 1979.

The self-storage facility has a US Post Office and Penske Truck Rental on location and offers free electronic recycling through partner PC Recycle.
