= Hollywood Wax Museum Pigeon Forge =

Hollywood Wax Museum (Pigeon Forge, TN)

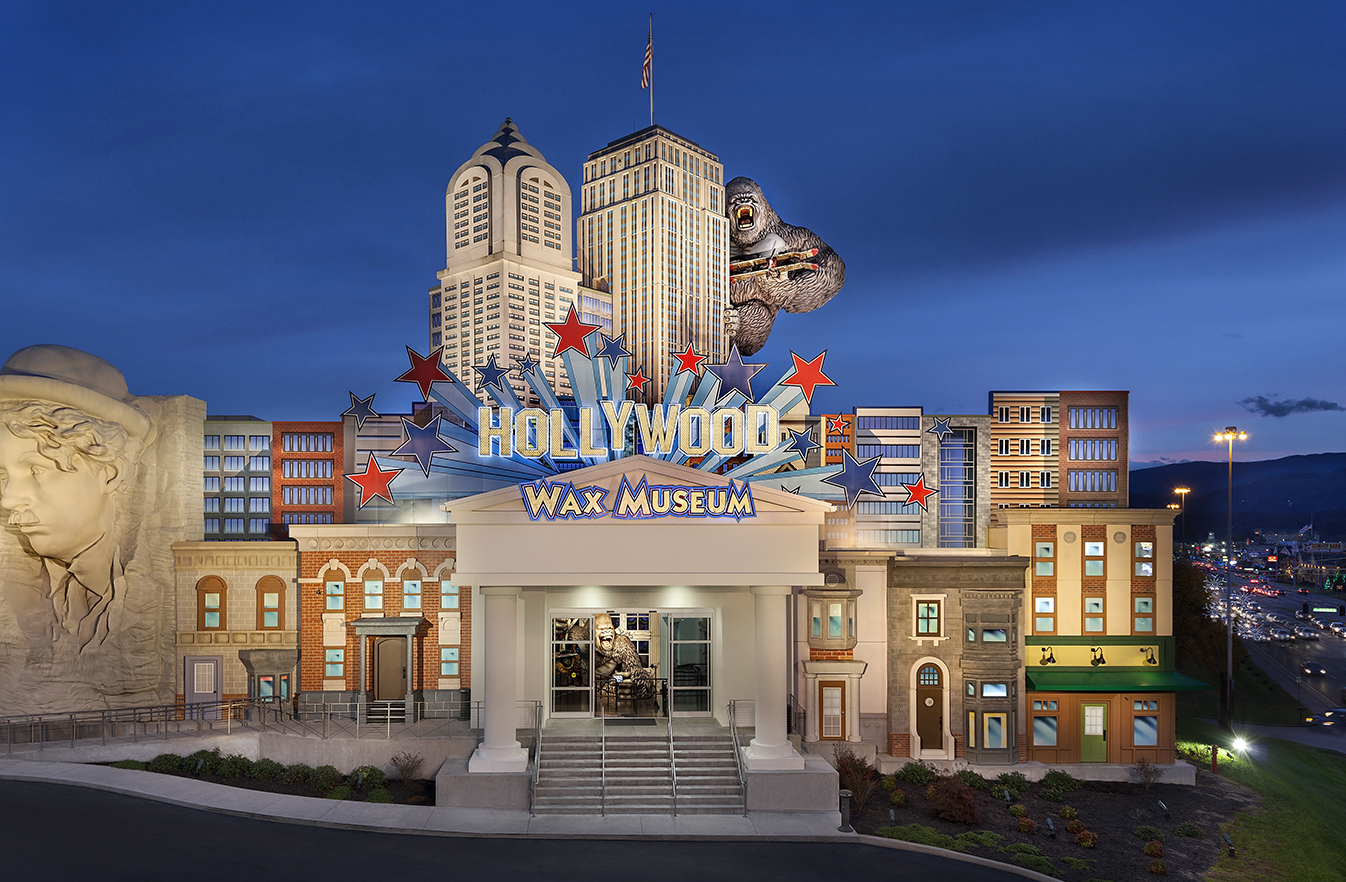
- Established: May 11, 2012
- Location: 106 Showplace Blvd, Unit A, Pigeon Forge, Tennessee
- Coordinates: 35.815204°N 83.577461°W
- Type: Wax museum
- Website: https://hollywoodwaxentertainment.com/

The Hollywood Wax Museum is a two-story wax museum in Pigeon Forge, Tennessee. It features replicas of celebrities in film, television and music. The Tennessee museum was originally located in Gatlinburg, Tennessee.

== Overview ==
It is the largest wax museum in the United States. The building is a tribute to the U.S. film industry and the artists who have become part of American culture and includes a Hollywood version of Mount Rushmore. and a six-story high Empire State Building being scaled by the Great Ape of Pigeon Forge.

The museum is part of the Hollywood Wax Museum Entertainment Center, owned and operated by descendants of Spoony Singh. Other attractions in the entertainment center include Hannah’s Maze of Mirrors, Castle of Chaos, and Outbreak – Dread the Undead

== Sets and exhibitions ==
Wax figures and sets continue to change regularly. There is also an arcade, a 4-D theater showing SpongeBob SquarePants 4-D, and a laser maze. The Hollywood Wax Museum also has a gift shop, which offers celebrity souvenirs and memorabilia.

== Other locations ==
The original Hollywood Wax Museum in Hollywood, California, was opened in 1965. The Hollywood Wax Museum Branson in Branson, Missouri, was opened in April 1996, and the Hollywood Wax Museum Myrtle Beach in Myrtle Beach, South Carolina, opened in May 2014.

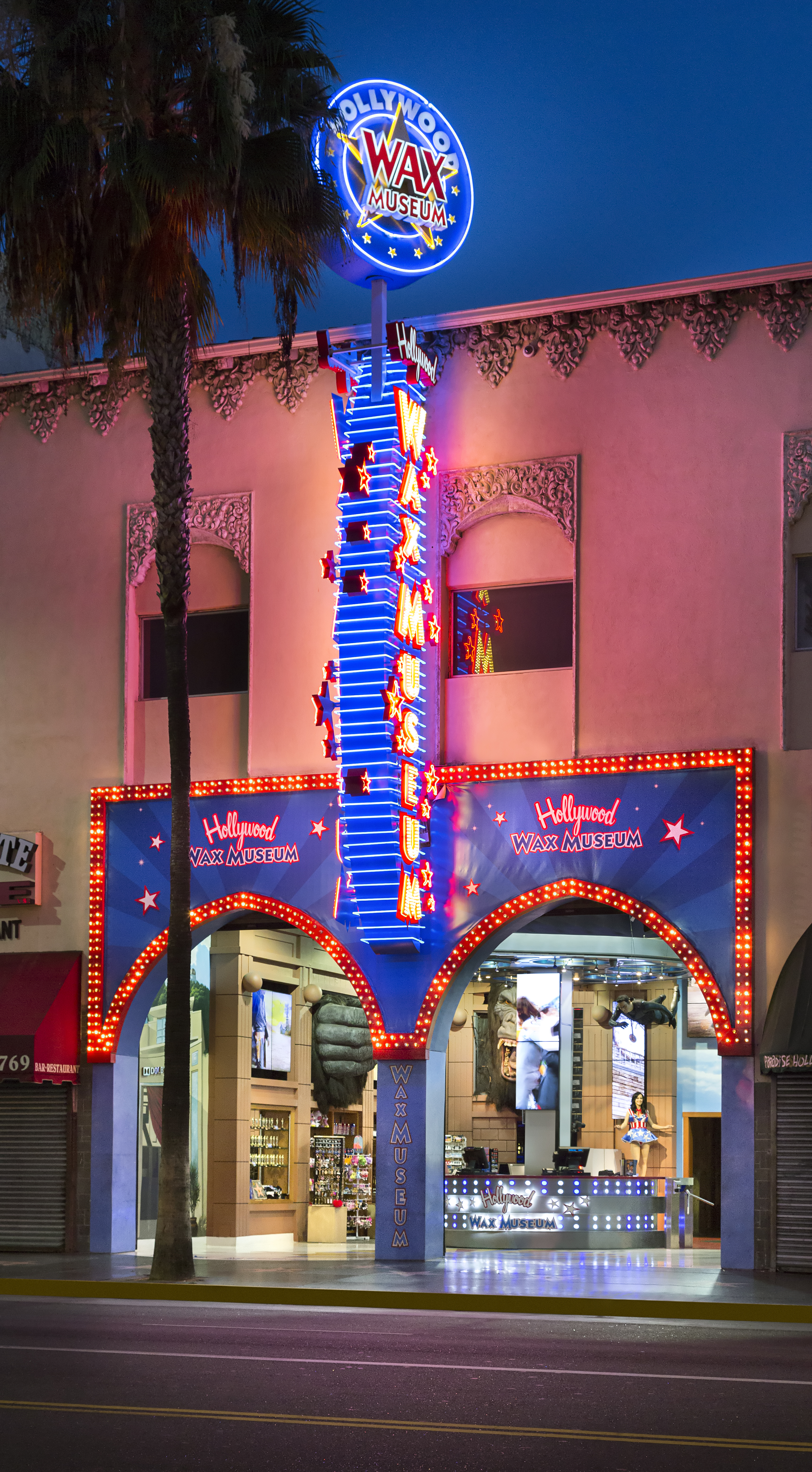
Hollywood Wax Museum in Hollywood, California

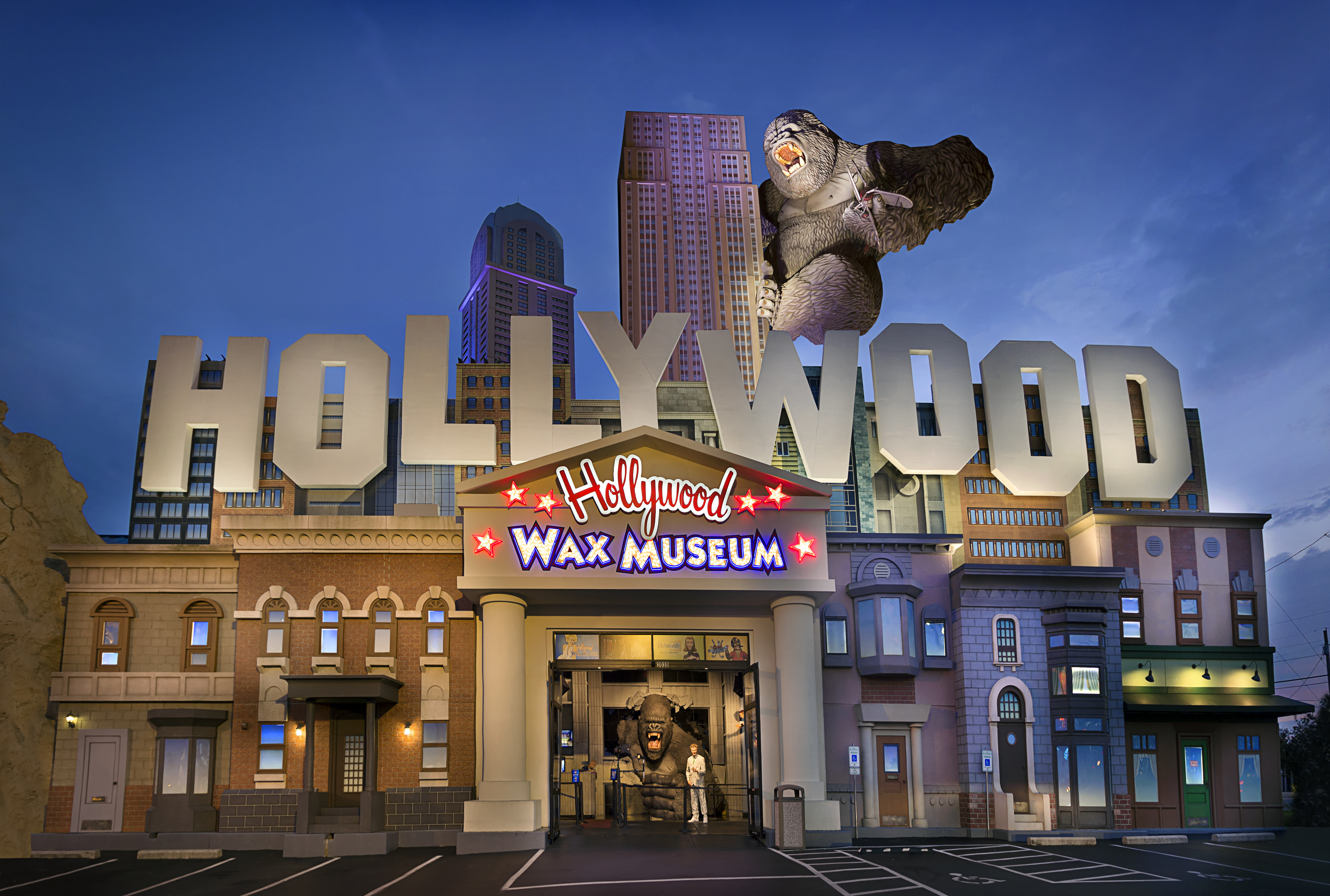
Hollywood Wax Museum Branson in Branson, Missouri

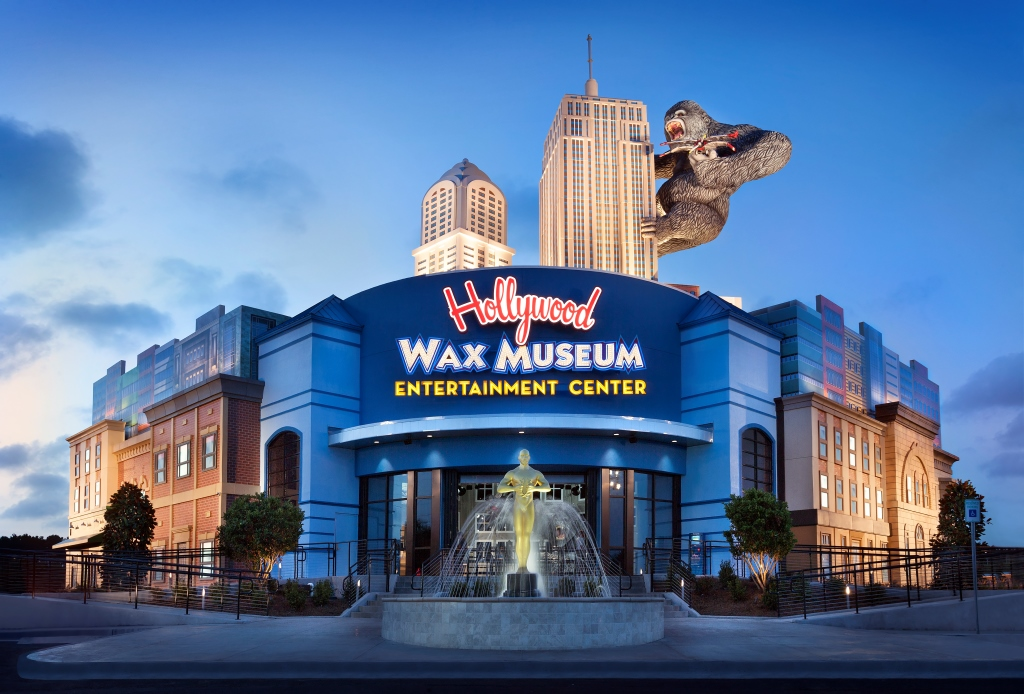
Hollywood Wax Museum Myrtle Beach in Myrtle Beach, South Carolina
