= Hollywood Wax Museum Branson =

Hollywood Wax Museum (Branson, MO)
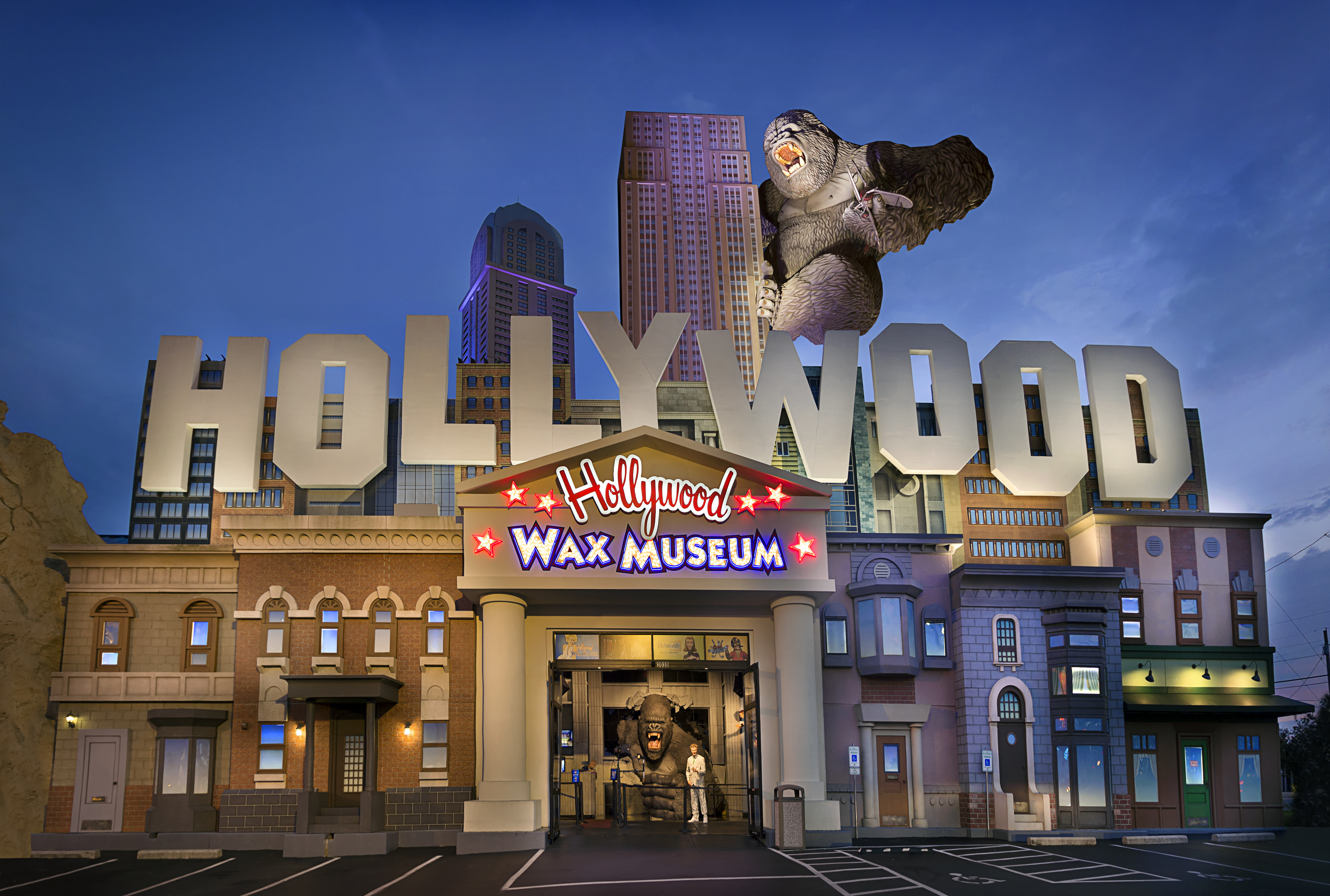
- Established: March 25, 1996
- Location: 3030 W 76 Country Blvd, Unit A, Branson, Missouri
- Coordinates: 36.637625°N 93.276940°W
- Type: Wax museum
- Website: http://hollywoodentertainmentcenter.com/

The Hollywood Wax Museum is a two-story wax museum featuring replicas of celebrities located on Highway 76 in Branson, Missouri.

== Overview ==
The museum is part of the Hollywood Wax Museum Entertainment Center, owned and operated by descendants of Spoony Singh.

It opened in 1996, with its own 150-foot-long Hollywood version of Mount Rushmore.

After a $5 million renovation in 2009, which included the addition of the 40-foot Great Ape of Branson, it was recognized with the 2011 Branson Beautification Award. The designation accounted for the owner's addition of other attractions surrounding the Hollywood Wax Museum including Castle of Chaos, Hannah's Maze of Mirrors, and Shoot for the Stars Mini-Golf.

In 2016, the facility was a founding member of the 76 Entertainment Community Improvement District (CID) and is slated to be part of the first phase of redeveloping the Highway 76 thoroughfare. In October 2014, the company also purchased 13-acre The Grand Palace property in Branson, MO, though future plans have not been announced.

== Sets and exhibitions ==
Wax figures and sets featuring replicas of celebrities continue to change regularly. The Hollywood Wax Museum also offers a souvenir store, which is the area's largest celebrity merchandise shop.

== Other Locations ==
The original Hollywood Wax Museum in Hollywood, California, was opened in 1965. The Hollywood Wax Museum Pigeon Forge in Pigeon Forge, Tennessee, was opened in May 2012, and the Hollywood Wax Museum Myrtle Beach in Myrtle Beach, South Carolina, opened in May 2014.

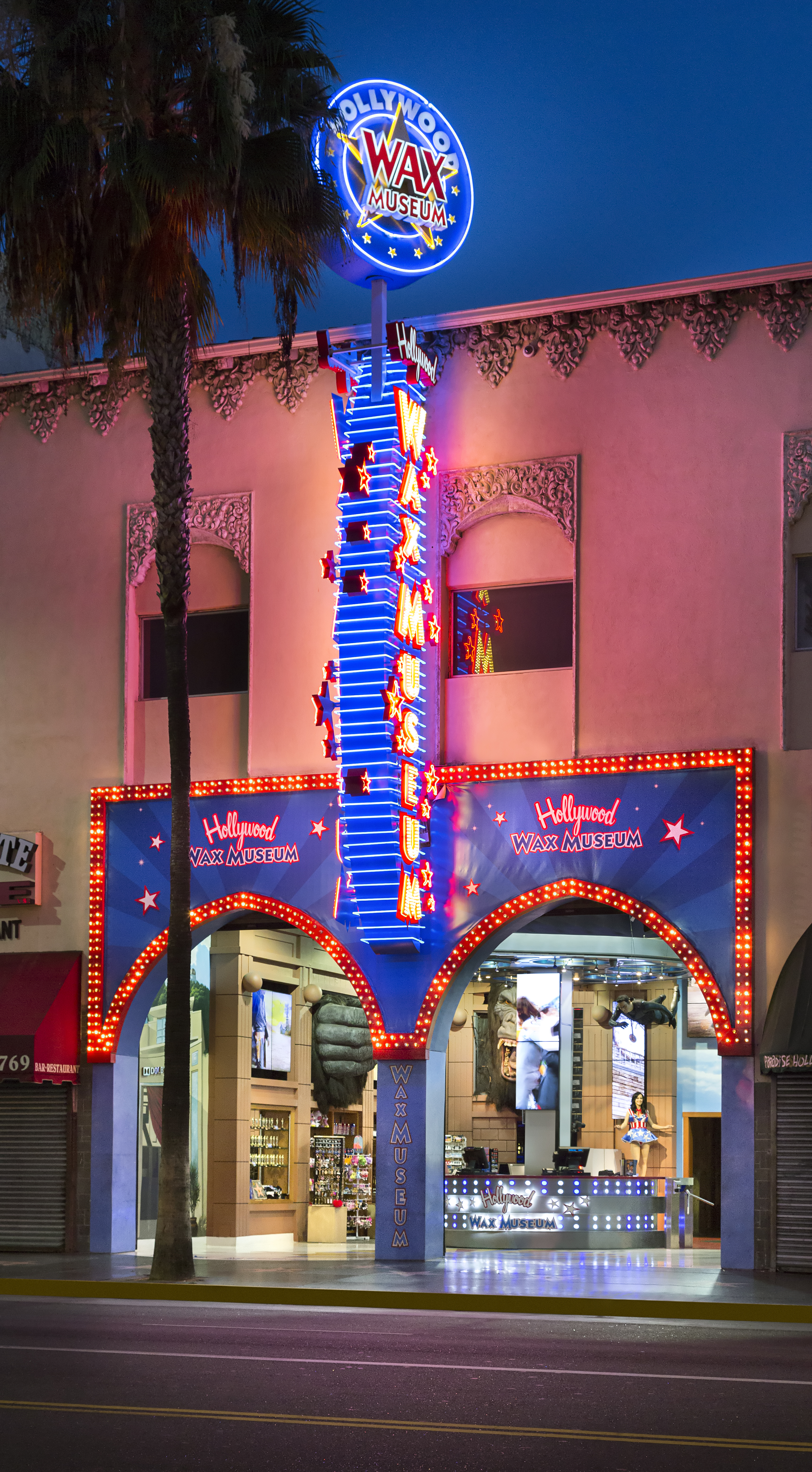
Hollywood Wax Museum in Hollywood, CA

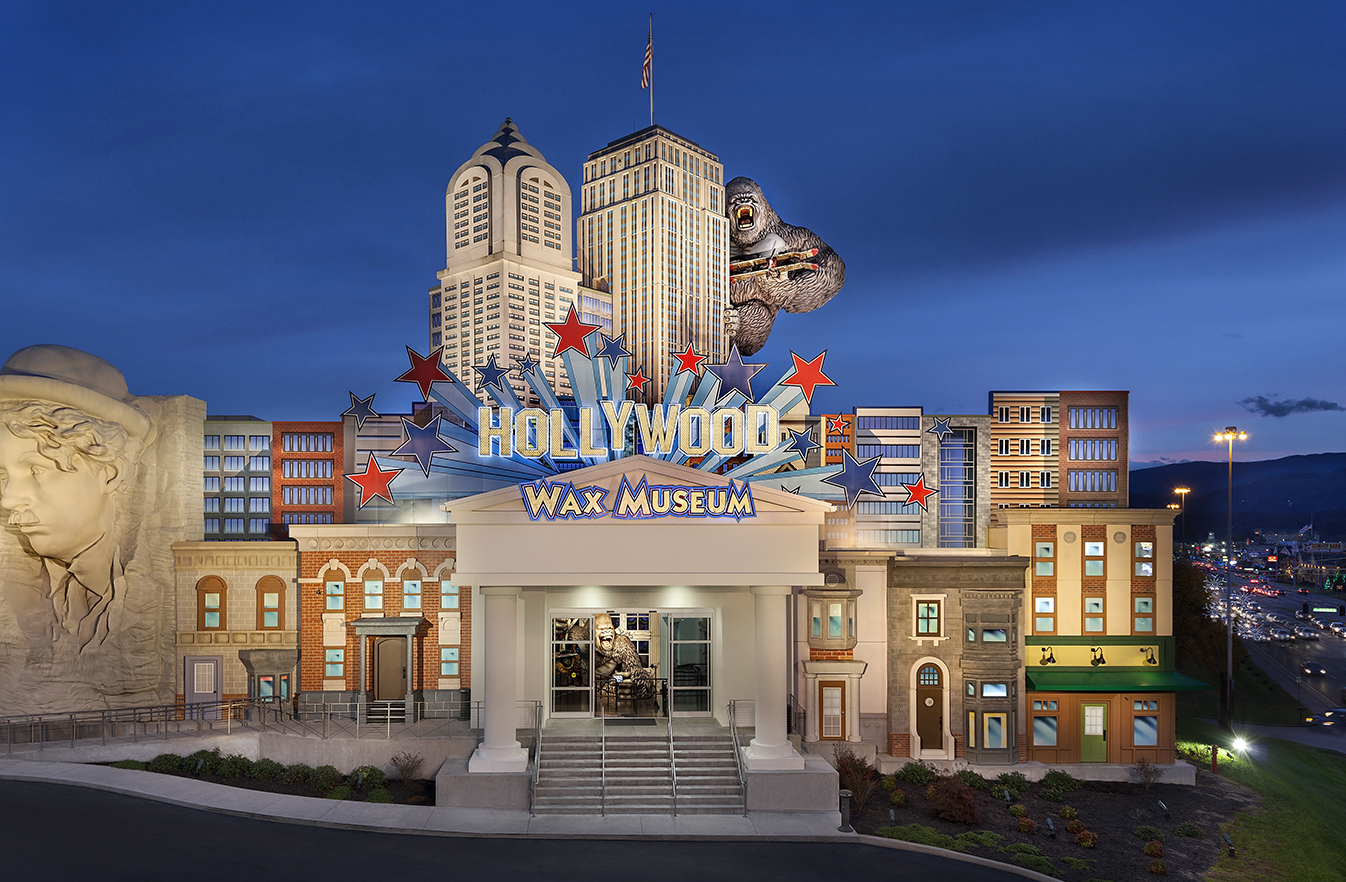
Hollywood Wax Museum Pigeon Forge in Pigeon Forge, TN

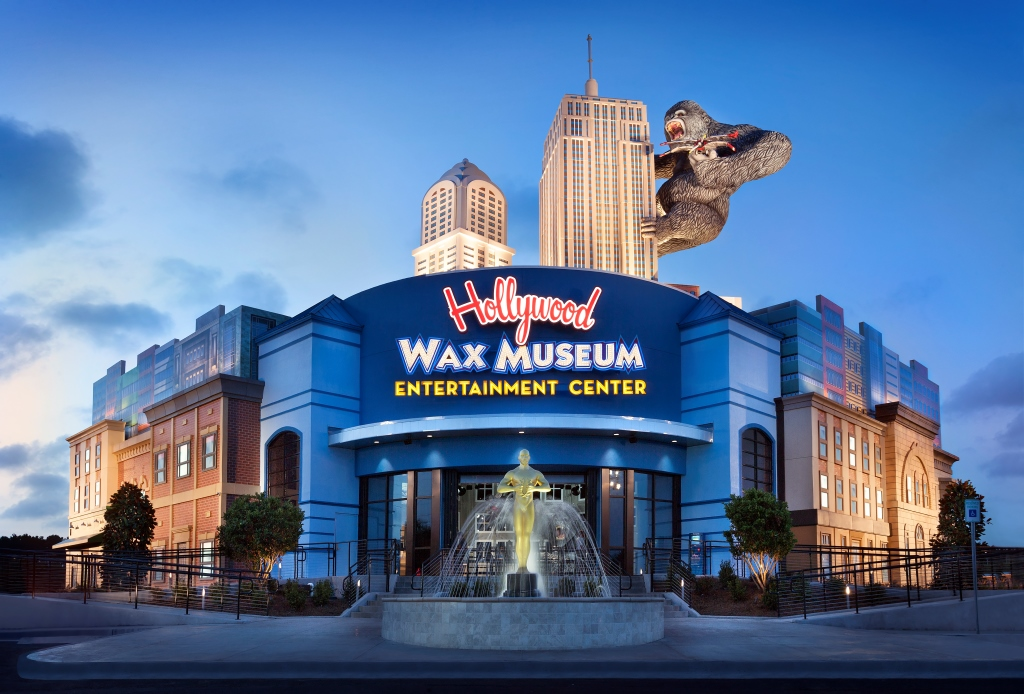
Hollywood Wax Museum Myrtle Beach in Myrtle Beach, SC
