= WonderWorks (museum) =

American science entertainment center

- Established: March 4, 1998
- Collection size: Interactive science exhibits
- Founder: John Morgan
- Website: www.wonderworksonline.com

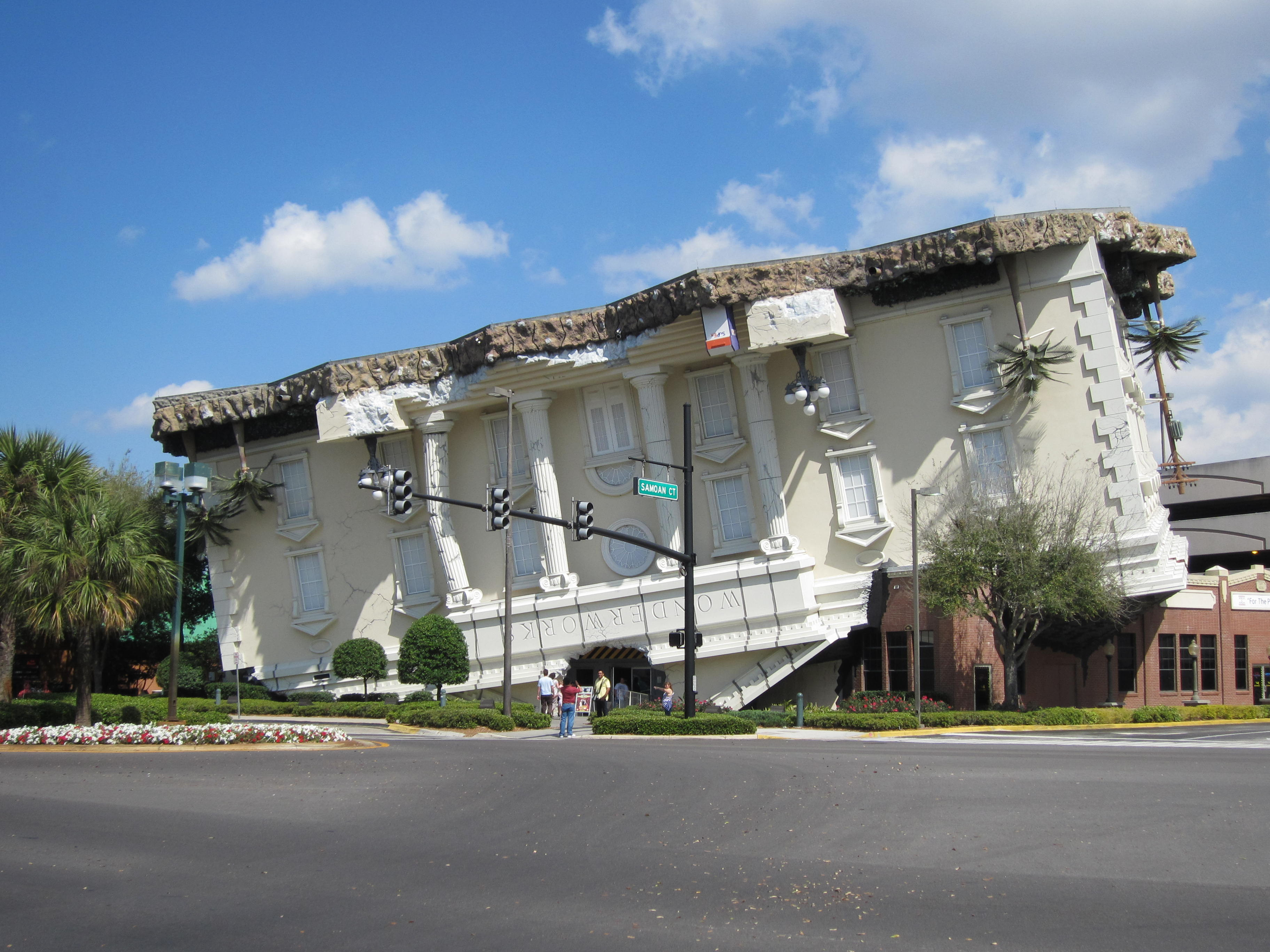
Street view of the WonderWorks Museum in Orlando, Florida

WonderWorks is an entertainment center focused on science exhibits with six locations in the United States. Its buildings are commonly built as if they are upside down.

The experience is considered "edutainment", a combination of education and entertainment.

It contains numerous interactive exhibits through which guests can learn about various phenomena and experience them firsthand.

== Description ==
Each WonderWorks location contains interactive entertainment exhibits on the themes of space, physics, and math. Some locations also offer a dinner magic show, as well as a 4D XD motion theater. Each WonderWorks building is designed to look as if an existing building was ripped free of the ground by severe weather and dropped upside down on its roof. This unique design is credited to the Orlando architect Terry O. Nichoson of Nichoson Design International, at WonderWorks' original Orlando location. Nichoson went on to serve as the main design consultant for all subsequent WonderWorks locations. 5 of the 6 locations offer laser tag and a multi-story ropes course. The Myrtle Beach location has an outdoor ropes course and zip-line, The Branson Location is the only location that does not have a ropes course. Most WonderWorks locations are open 365 days a year and it takes about 3–4 hours to tour each attraction.

The company has locations in Orlando, Florida (March 3, 1998); Pigeon Forge, Tennessee (2006); Panama City Beach, Florida (2009); Myrtle Beach, South Carolina (located in the Broadway at the Beach shopping mall) (2011); Syracuse, New York (located inside of Destiny USA) (2012) and Branson, Missouri (2020).

The exterior of WonderWorks museum is an upside-down building complete with upside down yard and decorations that continue to the inside of the museum.

== Story ==
The story of WonderWorks begun with the world's greatest scientists led by Professor Wonder. Their top-secret research laboratory located on a remote island in the Bermuda Triangle was the site for their latest experiment, creating a man-made tornado. The experiment went wrong, and the tornado was unleashed into the laboratory, removing it from the ground and carried it thousands of miles away until it landed upside down onto the current locations.

== Lower Buildings ==
Each location has the WonderWorks Lab on top of a random building:
Orlando, Florida: Warehouse
Pigeon Forge, Tennessee: Theater
Panama City Beach, Florida: Surf Shack
Myrtle Beach, South Carolina: Crab Shack
Syracuse, New York: 3rd Floor of Destiny USA
Branson, Missouri: Log Cabin

== Experiences ==
=== The WonderZones ===
==== Natural Disasters ====
The natural disasters zone includes activities such as the Tesla Coil, Earthquake Cafe, Hurricane Shack, how cold is it? and Trivia Wall. During these experiences, guest can watch the tesla coil emit 100,000 volts of electricity, feel an earthquake with a magnitude of 5.3 on the Richter Scale, experience a hurricane wind of 74 miles per hour, hold their hands under 28 °F icy water, and answer trivia questions about weather and disasters.

==== Physical Challenge ====
The physical challenge zone includes activities such as the Bed of Nails, Wonder Wall, Bubble Lab, Pulley Power and Virtual Sports. During these experiences, guests can lie down on 3500 nails, create 3-Dimensional images of their body on a gigantic pin wall, create bubbles big enough to fit inside, and pull themselves up using a rope and test their athletic skills.

==== Light and Sound ====
The light and sound zone includes activities such as the Speed of Light, Recollections, Strike a Pose and Giant Piano. During these experiences, guests can test their speed and reflexes, watch their shadow multiply into different colors and patterns on a wall and jump from key to key on a giant piano.

==== Space Discovery ====
The Space Discovery zone includes activities such as the Space suit, Mercury Capsule, Land the Shuttle, Astronaut Training Challenge and Wonder Coaster. During these experiences, guests can explore a life-sized replica of an EVA suit, climb into a replica of a launched capsule, maneuver the controls of a Space Shuttle, experience the feeling of weightlessness that astronauts feel when they are in space, and ride a roller coaster that they design themselves.

==== Imagination Lab ====
The Imagination Lab zone includes activities such as the Wonder Brite, Alien Stomper, Fun Express, Gear Works, The Adventures of Professor Wonder, and Forensic Science Exhibition. During these experiences, guests can rearrange colored pegs to create shapes and patterns, play an alien game and send them back to outer space, work on digital painting or arrange gears until their teeth are interlocked to spin them around and explore the real work of a forensic scientist.

==== Far Out Art Gallery ====
The Far-Out Art Gallery zone includes artwork of illusions that allows guests to explore the details of different paintings and try to find the hidden objects within them.

== Other Attractions ==
- Indoor Ropes Course
- 4D XD Motion Theater
- WonderWorks Laser Tag
- Outta Control Magic Comedy Dinner Show
