= Broadway at the Beach =

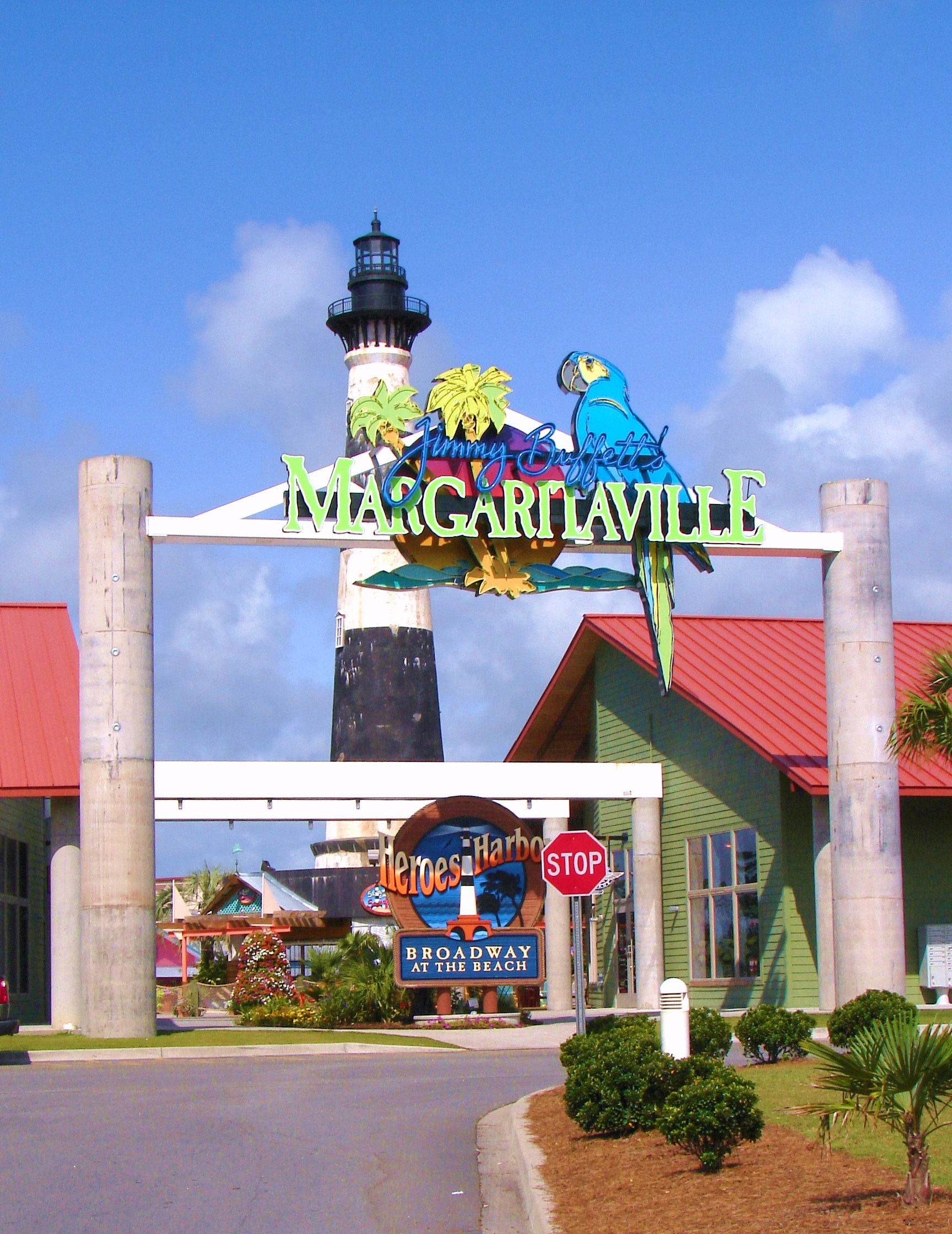
- Heroes Harbor, with a replica of the Morris Island Light
- Location: Myrtle Beach, South Carolina, United States
- Coordinates: 33.715627°N 78.881949°W
- Address: 1325 Celebrity Circle, Myrtle Beach, South Carolina, US
- Opened: July 4, 1995; 31 years ago
- Developer: Burroughs & Chapin
- Owner: Burroughs & Chapin
- Num. of stores: 150+
- Parking: 5,000+
- Public transit: Coast RTA via the Entertainment Shuttle during the summer months every 30-35 minutes from 9 AM until 12 AM (midnight) daily
- Website: broadwayatthebeach.com

Broadway at the Beach is a shopping center and entertainment complex located in Myrtle Beach, South Carolina. It is owned and operated by Burroughs & Chapin. The $250 million attraction is set on 350 acres (1.4 km^{2}) in the heart of Myrtle Beach and features three theaters, over 20 restaurants and over 100 specialty shops as well as attractions, Clubs for the night, and hotels, all surrounding the 23-acre (93,000 m^{2}) Lake Broadway. The complex receives upwards of 14 million visitors annually.

According to placer.ai, Broadway at the Beach is the most visited shopping center in South Carolina.

== Overview ==
The complex is divided into several distinct zones named New England Fishing Village, Caribbean Village, Charleston Boardwalk, Heroes Harbor and The Avenue, a warehouse district-themed nightclub district that stays open later than the rest of the districts. The complex is home to many attractions, such as the Ripley's Aquarium, Legends In Concert, WonderWorks, Hollywood Wax Museum and the Pavilion Nostalgia Park, which features rides from the former Myrtle Beach Pavilion. The complex contains three hotels, a Hampton Inn located inside the complex, and a Fairfield Inn and Holiday Inn Express located across 29th Avenue North in a section named Lakeshore at Broadway.

The Heroes Harbor zone includes a replica of the Morris Island Light atop a bar.

== History ==
Burroughs & Chapin announced the project in 1993. The July 4, 1995 grand opening included Senator Strom Thurmond and Governor David Beasley. The first attractions included Hard Rock Cafe and Palace Theatre (which once hosted Savage Garden and Weird Al Yankovic). A horseshoe shaped area ran from Celebrity Square to the “Generations at Play” fountain. Additional stores came later, along with Grissom Parkway. Nearby U.S. 17 Bypass attracted more development. In November 1996, a Planet Hollywood and All Star Cafe opened in the "Lakeshore at Broadway" district. The high-profile grand opening of the two restaurants in 1997 attracted celebrities such as Bruce Willis, Jennifer Love Hewitt and Will Smith.

In October 2010, Legends in Concert held its last show in nearby Surfside Beach before moving to the site of Club Kryptonite (which originally housed the All Star Cafe) in 2011. WonderWorks, described as "a science attraction housed in an upside-down building", opened April 4, 2011. On April 1, 2012, Backstage Mirror Maze and the Vault Laser Maze opened. The maze attraction recalls an actual bank robbery in Times Square from the 1930s.

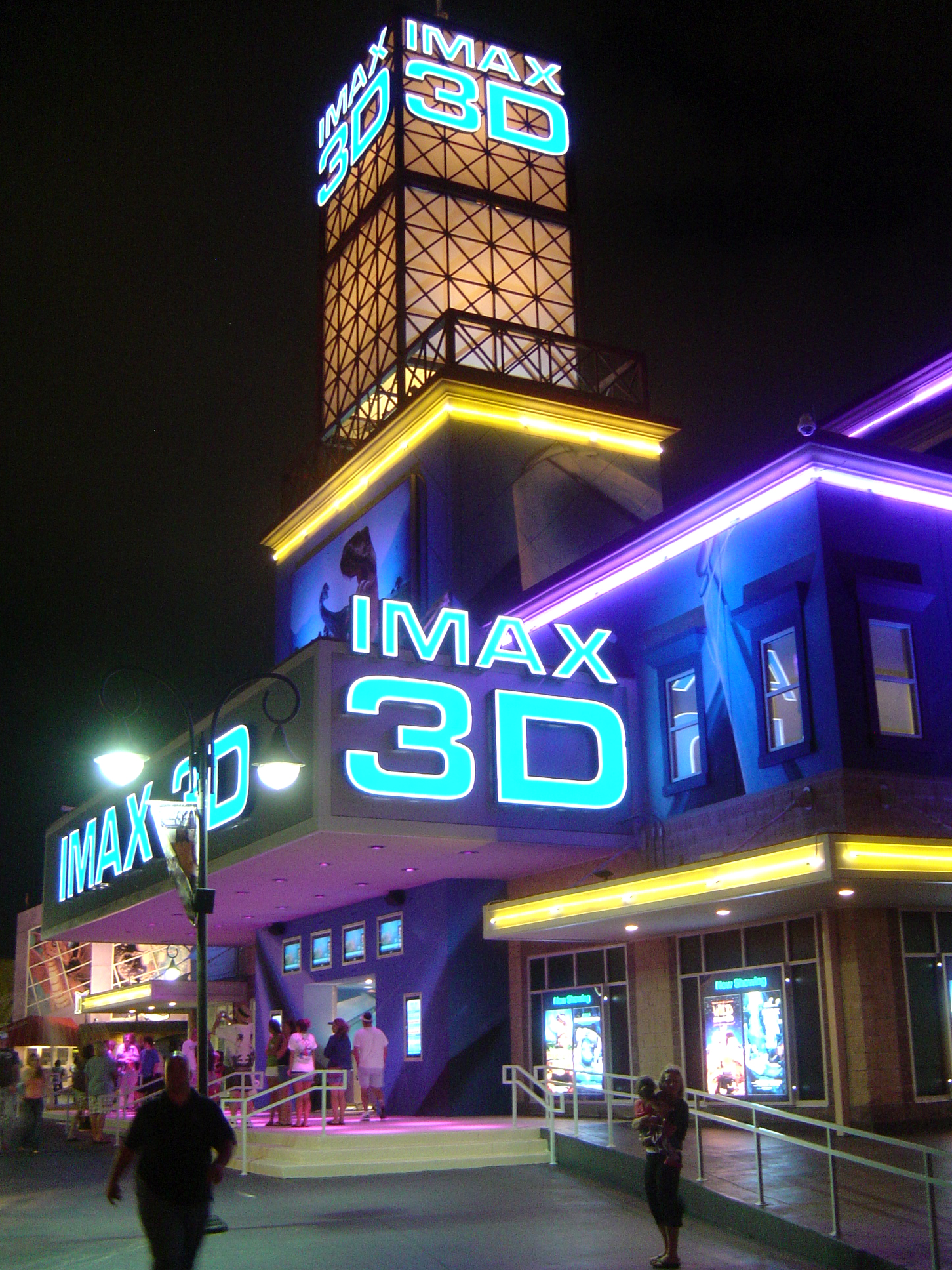
The former IMAX theater, later the Carmike Cinemas and AMC Theatres Big-D Theater. It closed in August 2019 and was demolished in September 2019.

Following Labor Day weekend in 2015, both Planet Hollywood and MagiQuest closed, and the globe-shaped Planet Hollywood building was demolished the following month. Around the same time, several clubs in the Celebrity Square district, including Revolutions and Carlos'n Charlie's announced that they would close in November. Some people living in the area expressed concern that Burroughs & Chapin wanted to drop adult attractions for a more family-oriented development.

On February 3, 2015, changes were announced that included the city's first Dave & Buster's as well as American Tap House and OZ nightclub. A new 15,043-square-foot Hard Rock Cafe opened in 2016. The landmark Hard Rock pyramid was demolished in fall 2016 to make way for the new Dave & Buster's. Additionally, a Wahlburgers location opened in fall 2016, replacing the former Club Rodeo. The former Carlos'n Charlie's restaurant is home to a two-story restaurant called Paula Deen’s Family Kitchen. Malibu’s Surf Bar, Crocodile Rocks, Original Shucker’s Raw Bar and the Carolina Comedy Club would stay where they were. The Celebrity Square district received a facelift to replace the aging "French Quarter" facade with a more contemporary style reminiscent of a warehouse district. In 2017 Celebrity Square was officially renamed "The Avenue"; all signage referencing Celebrity Square were subsequently removed.

The façade of the 2700-seat Palace Theatre received major damage from Hurricane Matthew in October 2016. Along with water damage, the situation led the city to declare the building "unfit for human occupancy" in January 2017 unless repairs were made. Hurricane Bonnie caused similar damage in 1998, but the theater had been more successful and repairs were still possible. On April 11, 2017, Chapin Company said the building would be torn down; the building was demolished starting April 25, 2017.

One of the new attractions for 2018 was the 360 Observation Wheel, a 156-foot (48 m) Ferris Wheel with 36 gondolas that will seat six, and a million lights that can flash along with music. In August 2018, a 4D ride based on The Simpsons opened, housed in a replica of The Aztec theater from the series. Next door, a gift shop modeled after Kwik-E-Mart sells in-series merchandise such as Buzz Cola, Lard Lad Donuts, and Squishees.

It was announced on December 11, 2018, that Broadway Louie's, a sports and karaoke bar, would be closing after 20 years following the venue's New Year's Eve bash. No reason was given for the closing of the venue.

On August 8, 2019, after 23 years, the AMC Classic Broadway 16 had its final showings and later closed. It had operated as a Carmike theater before AMC acquired Carmike. It had once been IMAX Theater, which became the Big-D Theater operated by Carmike, and later AMC. It was demolished in September, 2019.

On March 15, 2021, it was announced that there was a new tenant for the space previously occupied by Oz nightclub. The Charles Bach Wonders Theatre planned to move into the space and to begin offering three show daily starting on June 4, 2021.

On April 17, 2021, Broadway at the Beach announced the return of weekly firework shows that summer, as well as several new merchants. New merchants include Byrd's Famous Cookies, Fresh-Up, the Broadway Theater, and Retro Active 2. Located next to Build A Bear Workshop, IT'SUGAR recently opened a Sour Patch Kids store inside their spac for both sweet and sour candy fans.

== Gallery ==
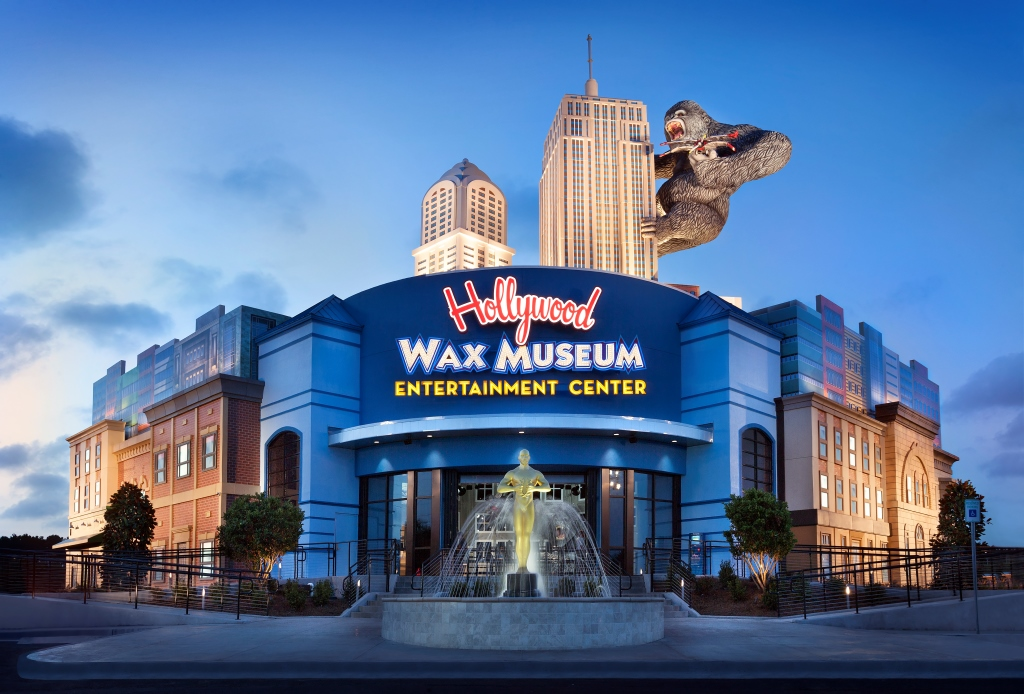
The Hollywood Wax Museum, originally NASCAR Cafe

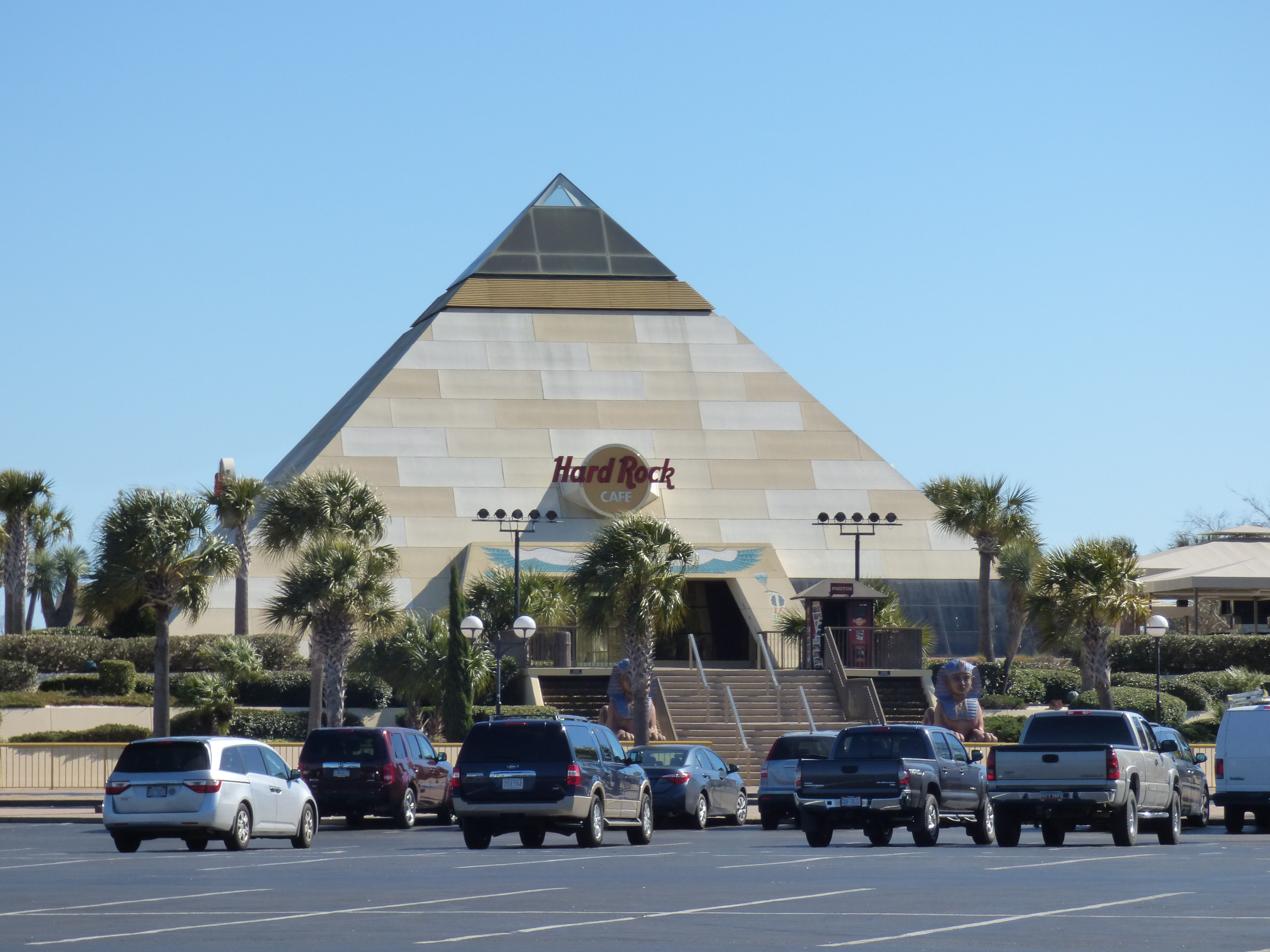
Hard Rock Cafe prior to relocation in 2015, currently Dave & Buster's

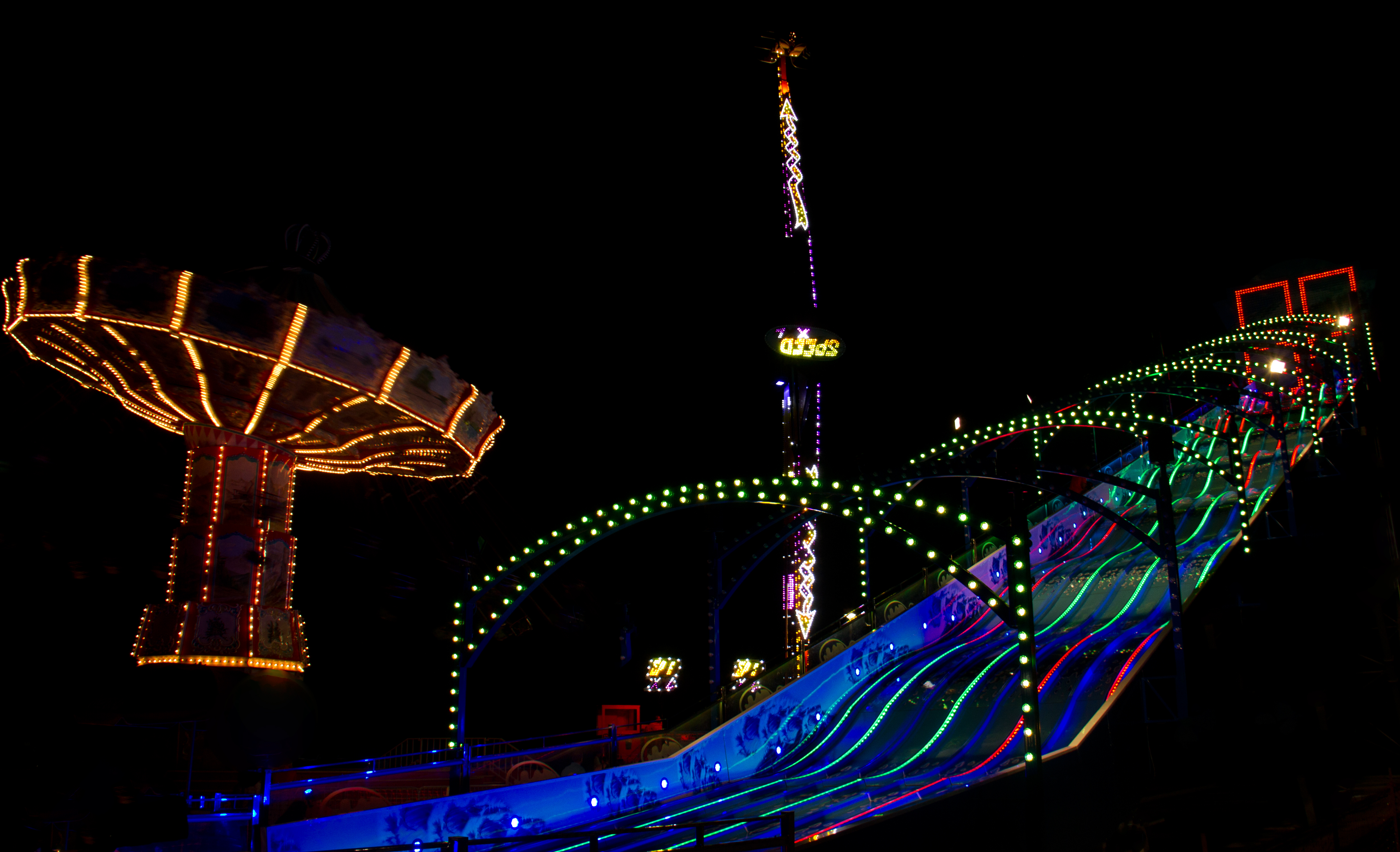
Pavilion Nostalgia Park

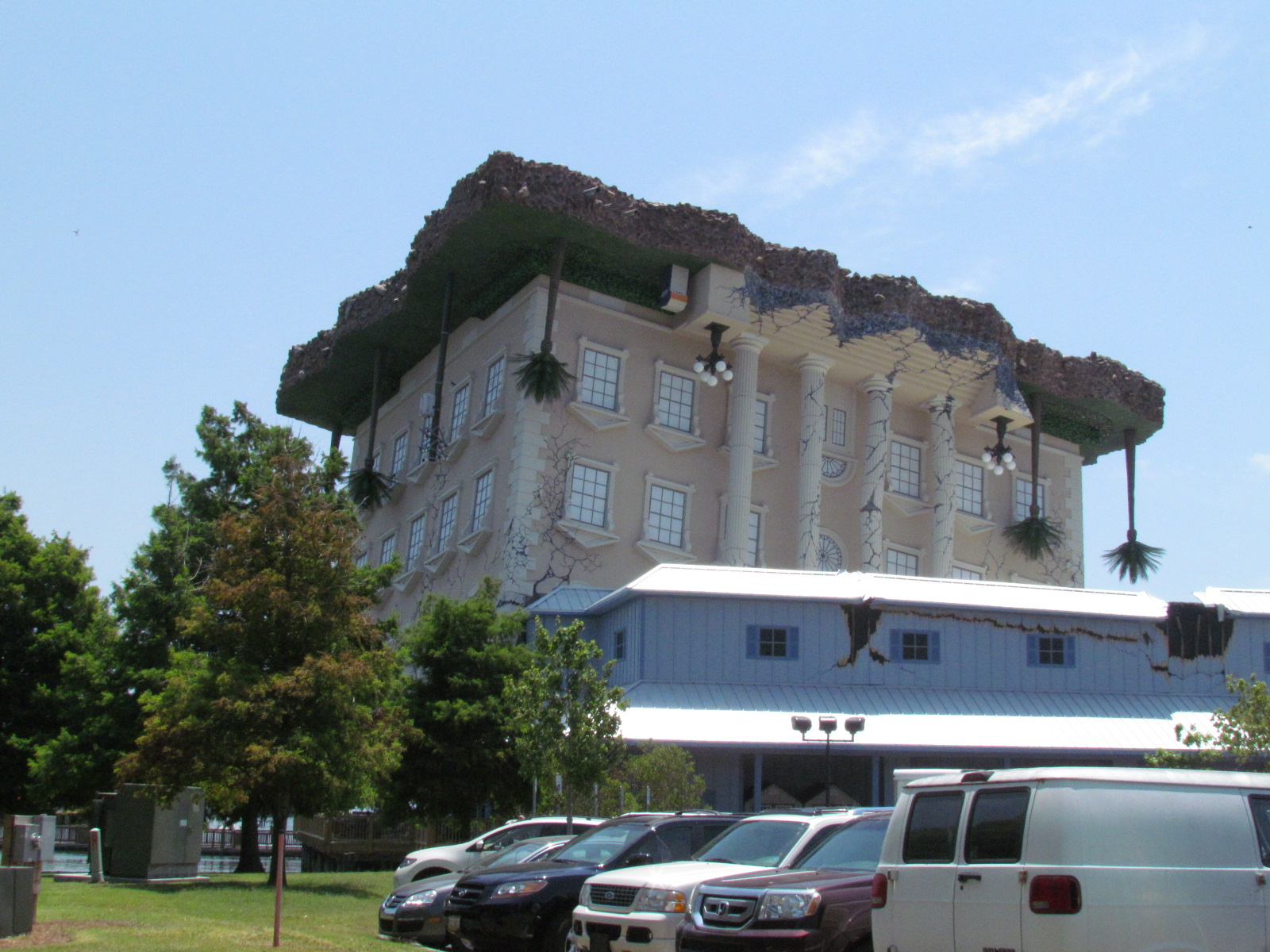
WonderWorks

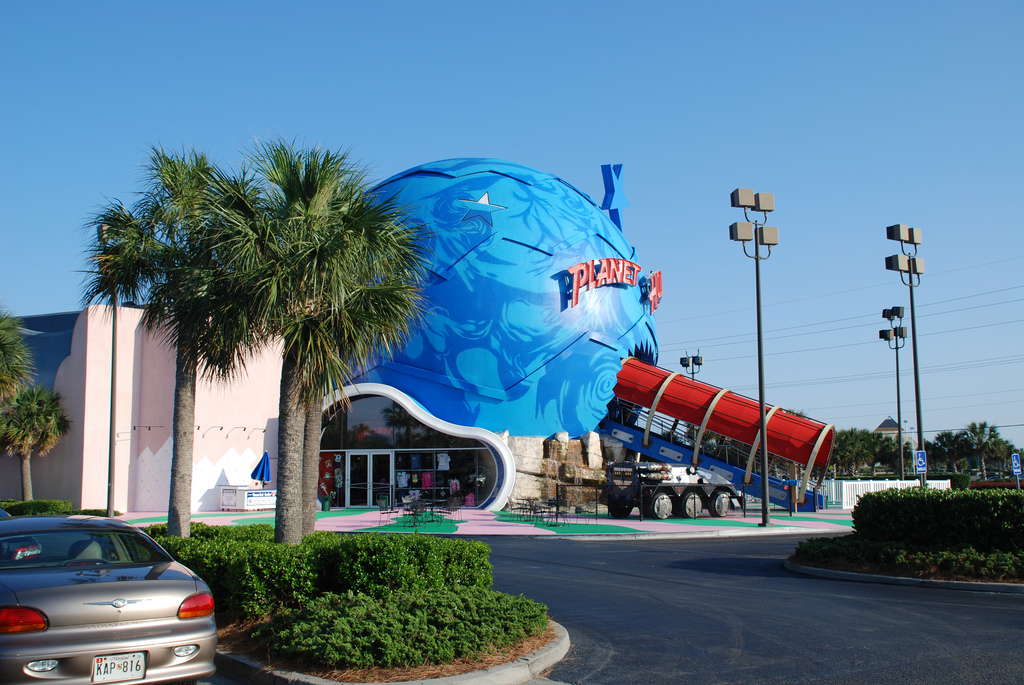
Former Planet Hollywood, demolished in 2015; current site of Carolina Ale House
