= Hollywood Wax Museum =

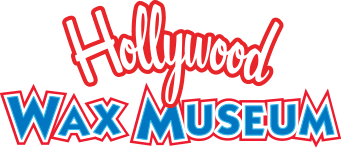

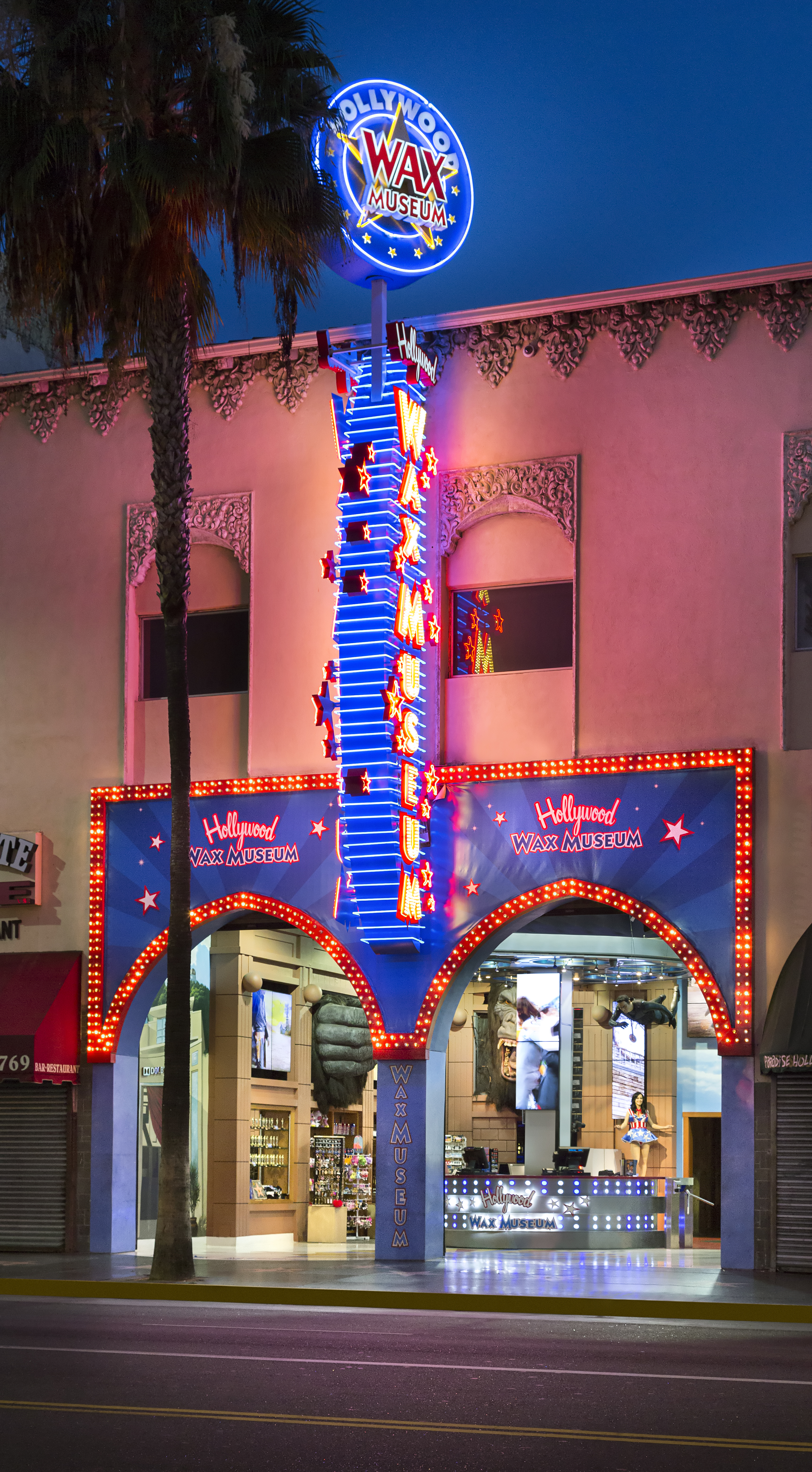
- Established: February 6, 1965
- Location: 6767 Hollywood Boulevard; Hollywood, California; 90028
- Coordinates: 34.101627°N 118.338133°W
- Type: Wax museum
- Website: www.hollywoodwaxmuseum.com

The Hollywood Wax Museum is a wax museum featuring replicas of celebrities located on Hollywood Boulevard in the tourist district in Hollywood in Los Angeles, California. The replicas on display include A-List stars as well as classic entertainers.

The museum claims in promotional literature to be the only wax museum dedicated solely to celebrities.

== History ==
The Hollywood Wax Museum opened on February 26, 1965, to a line 1/2 mile long. After opening, owner Spoony Singh continued to build the museum's fame by befriending celebrities, gossip columnists, members of the foreign press association, and fans.

After Singh's retirement, his sons and grandson continued to own, operate, and further the Hollywood Wax Museum's legacy. In June 2012, the family was recognized as Heroes of Hollywood by the Hollywood Chamber of Commerce Community Foundation for their staunch and generous support of the Hollywood community.

== Sets and exhibitions ==
Wax figures and sets featuring replicas of celebrities continue to change regularly. There is also a Chamber of Horrors, featuring classic and current movie monsters.

== Location ==
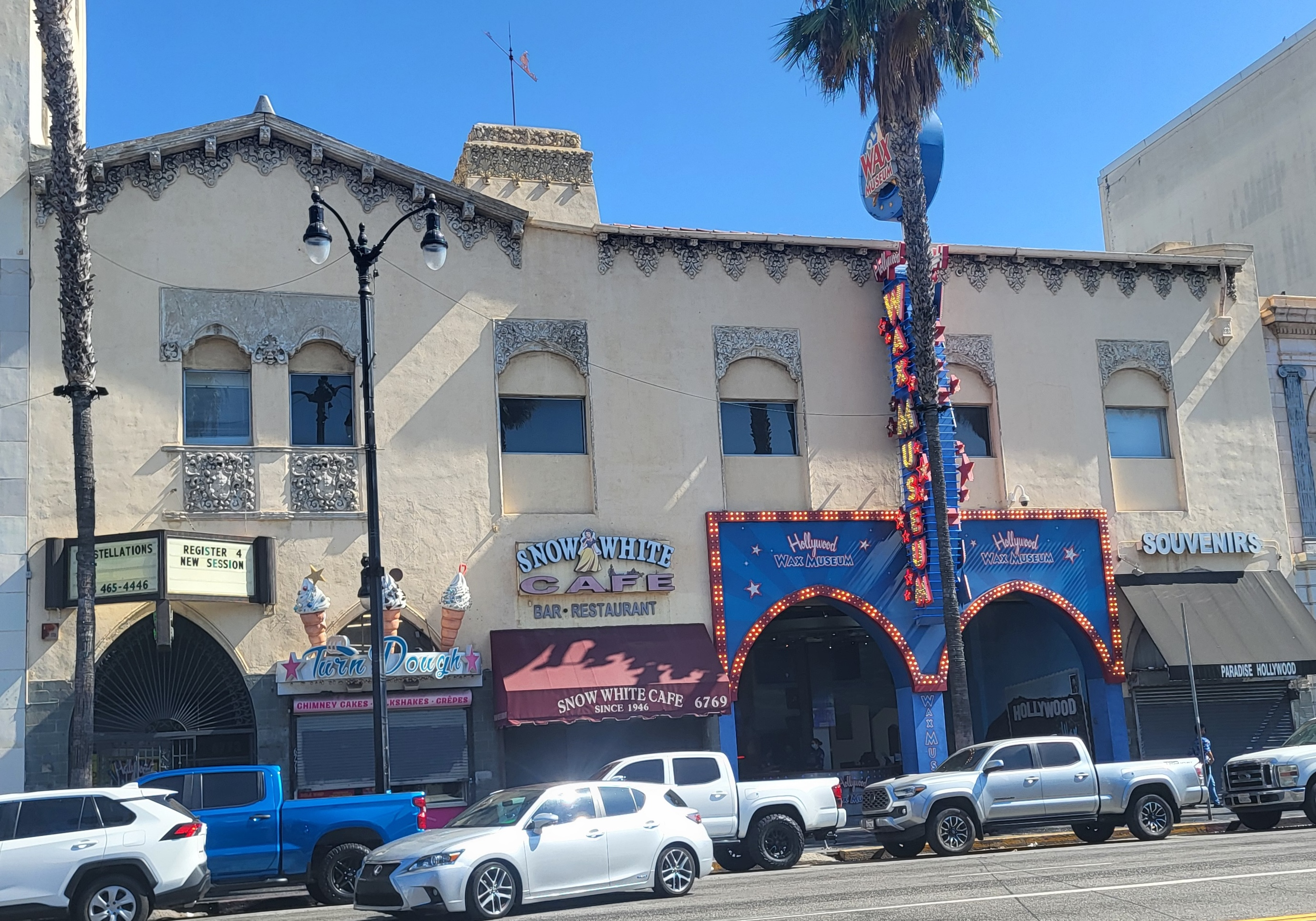
Wax Museum building

Hollywood Wax Museum is located in the Christie Realty Building, designed by Carl Jules Weyl and built in 1928.

=== Other locations ===
Hollywood Wax Museum Branson opened in Branson, Missouri in 1996 and was completely renovated in 2009. In 2011, the museum was recognized with the Branson Beautification Award for improving an important stretch of Highway 76.

A third Hollywood Wax Museum opened in Gatlinburg, Tennessee in 2007. However, it closed three years later, to be replaced by the larger Hollywood Wax Museum Pigeon Forge in Pigeon Forge, Tennessee that opened in May 2012.

The fourth Hollywood Wax Museum opened at Broadway at the Beach in Myrtle Beach, South Carolina in 2014.

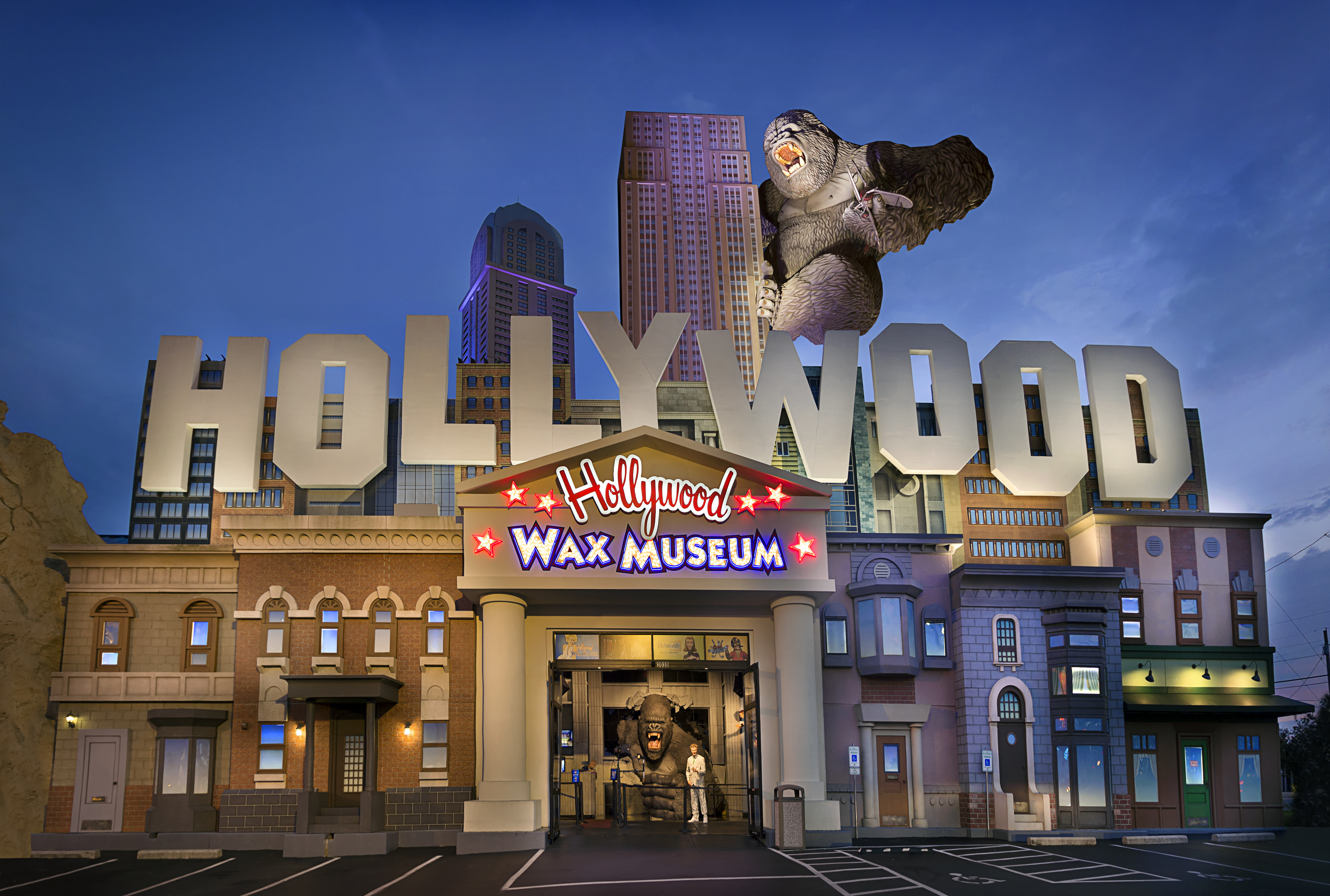
Hollywood Wax Museum in Branson, Missouri

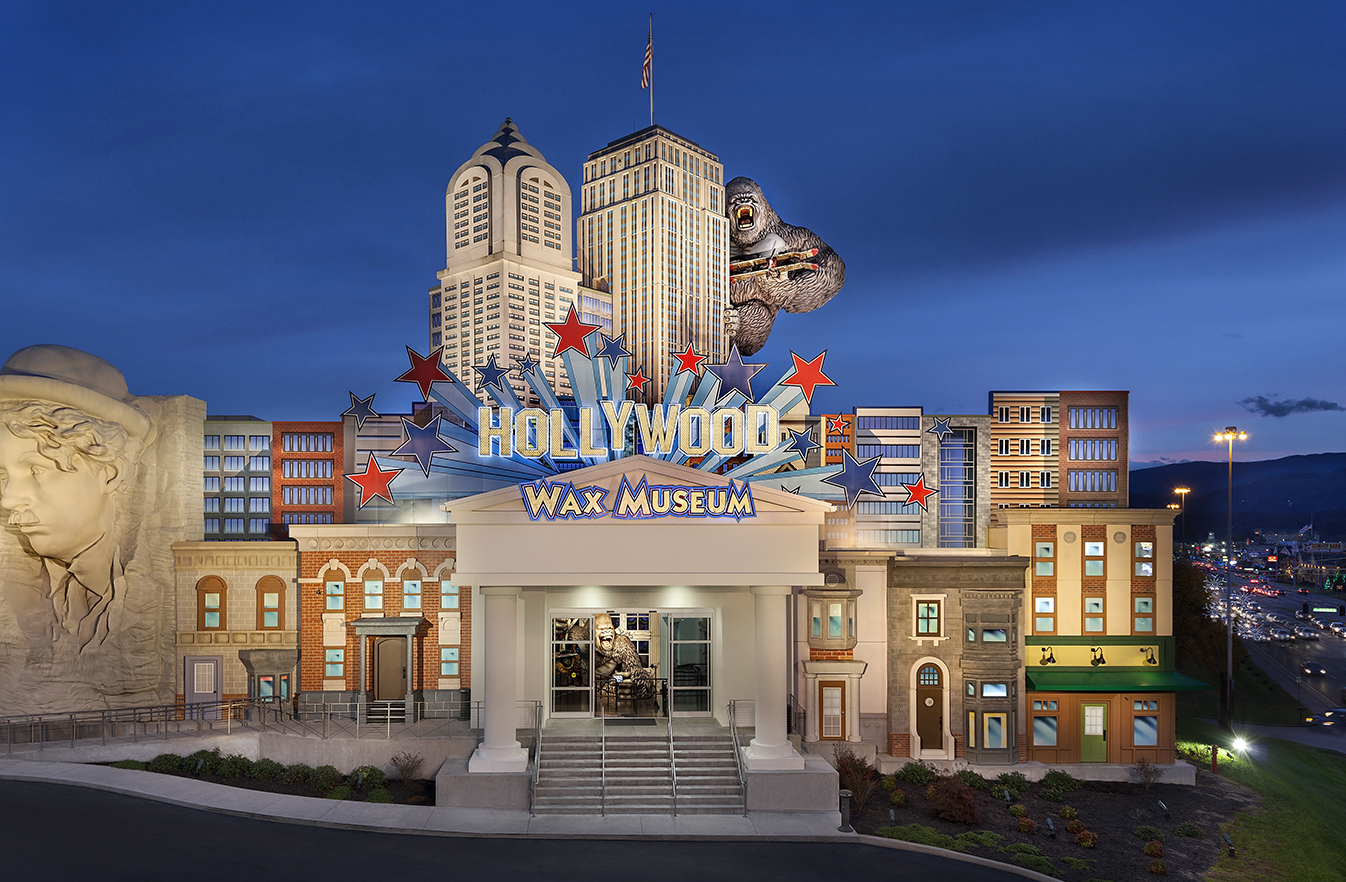
Hollywood Wax Museum in Pigeon Forge, Tennessee

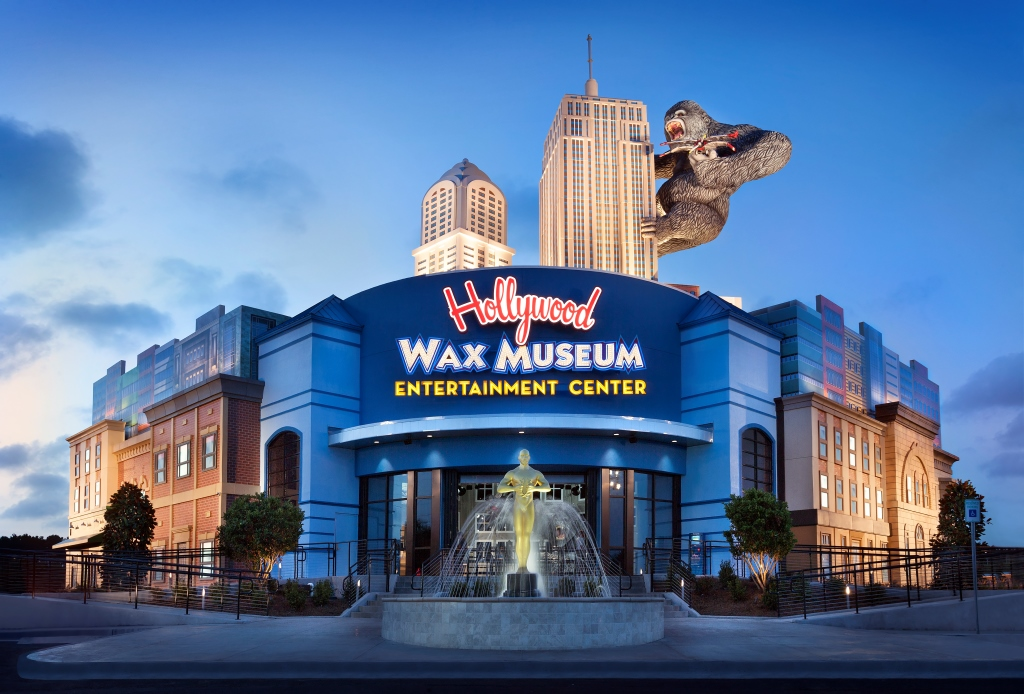
Hollywood Wax Museum in Myrtle Beach, South Carolina

== In popular culture ==
The Hollywood Wax Museum has appeared in The Mechanic, Cursed, and America's Next Top Model. It also features on the video game Midnight Club: Los Angeles.
