= Spoony Singh =

Businessman, owner of Hollywood Wax Museum (1922–2006)

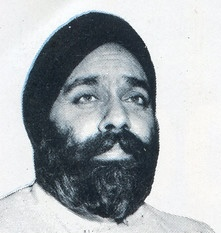
- Born: Sapuran Singh Sundher; 22 October 1922; Jalandhar, Punjab, British India (present-day Punjab, India)
- Died: 18 October 2006 (aged 83); Malibu, California, U.S.
- Resting place: Forest Lawn Memorial Park, Hollywood Hills
- Occupations: Businessman, entrepreneur
- Known for: Owner of the Hollywood Wax Museum
- Spouse: Chancil Kour Hoti (m. 1943)
- Children: 6

Sapuran Singh Sundher (22 October 1922 – 18 October 2006), popularly known as Spoony Singh, was an Indian-born Canadian businessman and entrepreneur known for his personality and establishing the Hollywood Wax Museum.

== Early years and career ==
Singh was born on 22 October 1922 in a small farming village in Jalandhar, British Punjab. One of four children, his family moved to Vancouver, British Columbia, Canada in 1924, eventually settling in Victoria, British Columbia. Singh attended Quadra Elementary where classmates nicknamed him "Spoony". He later graduated from Victoria High School. Singh was accepted to college but by that time, his father had developed chronic asthma from working in sawmills and was unable to work. To support his family, Singh went to work at a shingle mill. He eventually earned enough money to open a sawmill in Esquimalt and a logging camp near Port Alberni. By 1954, Singh and his wife were able to build a home in the Peacock Hill section of Saanich, British Columbia.

He then opened an amusement park he called "Spoony's" in Victoria. The park featured a restaurant, trampolines and go-carts powered by motors used from chainsaws. In 1964, Singh was approached by investors who were interested in opening a wax museum in the United States. He went on a two-week scouting trip to Los Angeles where he toured famous attractions on Hollywood Boulevard devoted to celebrities. After realizing that he had not seen any celebrities at these attractions save for their foot and handprints at Grauman's Chinese Theatre, Singh decided to create a place where fans could see them. Singh later said, "...I thought, let's bring the stars back to Hollywood Boulevard. Let's allow people to get close and look into the eyes of their favorite entertainers." Singh's answer was the Hollywood Wax Museum, a museum which features wax replicas of celebrities and historical figures. He bought an empty brassiere factory and luggage shop located at 6767 Hollywood Boulevard and, on 25 February 1965, opened the museum to the public. On its opening day, a line of visitors a half a mile long waited to get in. Singh became known for the inventive ways he promoted the museum including having an actor dressed as Charlie Chaplin greet visitors and skateboarders dressed in gorilla suits that he paid to skate in front of the museum. In one instance, Singh hired people to jump out from behind the wax figures to scare patrons; the practice was later stopped for fear of lawsuits.

Singh, who used his middle name (which means "lion") as his surname for professional purposes, became something of a celebrity in the local Hollywood community. His ever-present dastar, Nehru jacket, full beard (Singh was an observant Sikh), and penchant for flamboyant showmanship to promote his museum made him a well known personality. In 1979, Singh expanded his business after opening the Thousand Oaks Self Storage (now known as the Hollywood Storage Center).

== Personal life ==
Sapuran with a wax replica of actress Marilyn Monroe in 1966

Singh married Chancil Kaur Hoti in 1943. The couple had six children, four sons and two daughters, and remained married until Singh's death.

== Later years and death ==
Singh retired in 1990 but continued to oversee his businesses which are now run by his family. He oversaw the opening of the Hollywood Guinness World Records Museum in 1991, the opening of a second location of the Hollywood Wax Museum Branson in Branson, Missouri in 1996, and the expansion of his storage business in 2002.

On 18 October 2006, Singh died of congestive heart failure at his home in Malibu, California at the age of 83. His funeral was held on 24 October at Forest Lawn Memorial Park, Hollywood Hills where his Antim Sanskar was held.

== In popular culture ==
In 1965, Singh appeared on the 7 November episode of the game show What's My Line (additionally notable as regular panelist Dorothy Kilgallen's final episode before her untimely death). The panel failed to guess his profession.
