= Louis Tussaud =

English wax museum founder

Louis Joseph Kenny Tussaud
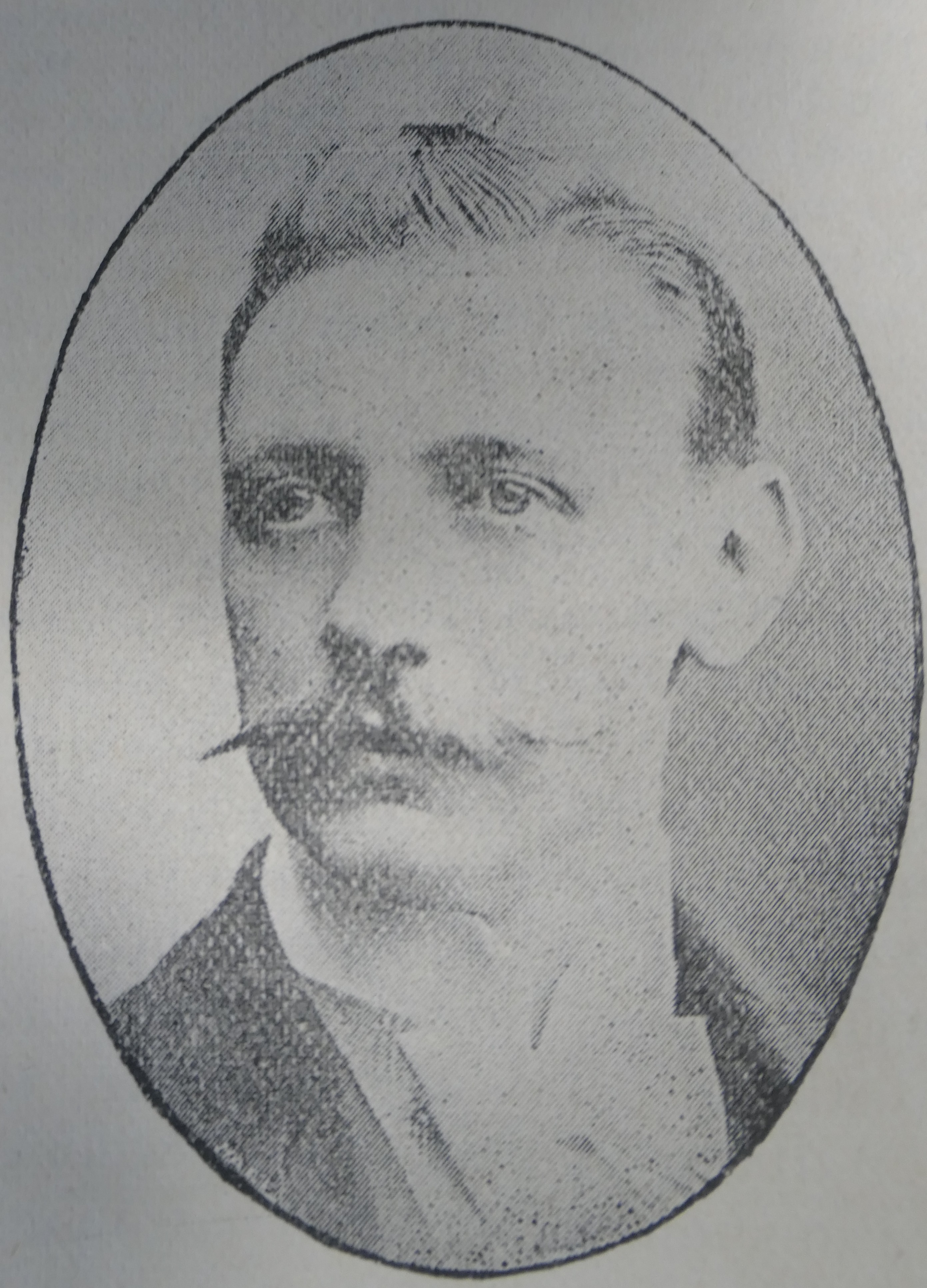
- Louis Tussaud, 1894
- Born: 1869; London
- Died: 1938 (aged 68–69); Hendon
- Known for: Wax modelling

Louis Joseph Kenny Tussaud (1869–1938) was a great-grandson of Marie Tussaud, creator of the Madame Tussauds wax museums. He worked at Madame Tussauds museum as a wax figure sculptor but left when his brother John Theodore Tussaud became chief artist and manager of the museum after a limited company was formed in 1888 and sold in 1889. The main shareholder was Edwin Josiah Poyser.

Louis Tussaud created a waxwork museum in London, 207 Regent Street, which opened 24 December 1890. The Regent Street waxwork museum was destroyed in a fire on 20 June 1891. He moved to Blackpool in 1900. He first set up a waxworks in Blackpool in the basement of the Hippodrome Theatre, Church Street, opening it in July 1900. The following year, he moved the exhibition to the Brunswick Café, South Shore. In 1929 the Louis Tussaud's Waxworks opened on Central Promenade. It was closed in 2010 and re-opened as Madame Tussauds in 2011.

== Later museums ==
Wax museums using the Louis Tussaud name were subsequently established in several cities, including Atlantic City, Belle Vue, Brighton, Copenhagen, Great Yarmouth and St. Pete Beach, Florida. A Shakespeare-themed exhibition also operated at 60 Henley Street in Stratford-upon-Avon.

Louis Tussaud's Waxworks in Blackpool traced its origins to an exhibition opened by Tussaud in the town in 1900. The later attraction on Central Promenade closed in 2010 and was converted into Madame Tussauds Blackpool, which opened in 2011.

Ripley Entertainment has operated several attractions under the Louis Tussaud name. An archived Ripley webpage documented Louis Tussaud's Waxworks at 301 Alamo Plaza in San Antonio, where it displayed more than 200 wax figures. Ripley also operated Louis Tussaud's Waxworks, later promoted as Louis Tussaud's Palace of Wax, in Grand Prairie, Texas.

Other current Ripley-operated Louis Tussaud attractions are located in Niagara Falls, Ontario, and Newport, Oregon.

A Louis Tussaud's Wax Museum formerly operated at Innovative Film City near Bengaluru, India. The attraction's website described it as the only Louis Tussaud museum in India.

Louis Tussaud's Waxworks also operates as one of the attractions at Ripley's Believe It or Not! in Pattaya, Thailand. The Pattaya complex is managed by Minor Sky Rider Company Limited.

Louis Tussaud's museums are not connected to his great-grandmother's Madame Tussauds wax museum nor to the Josephine Tussaud's (1900–1985) wax museum in Hot Springs, Arkansas.

Louis Tussauds, Blackpool, (which was temporarily owned by Leisure Parcs) was bought out by Blackpool Council. The attraction closed in November 2010 and passed to the management of the Merlin Entertainment Group.

The Potter's Wax Museum of St. Augustine and the wax museum of Niagara Falls have wax busts representing Louis Tussaud. The wax museum of Bangalore has a full-sized wax figure representing Louis Tussaud.
