= Madame Tussauds =

Wax museum in London

Coordinates: 51°31′22″N 0°09′19″W

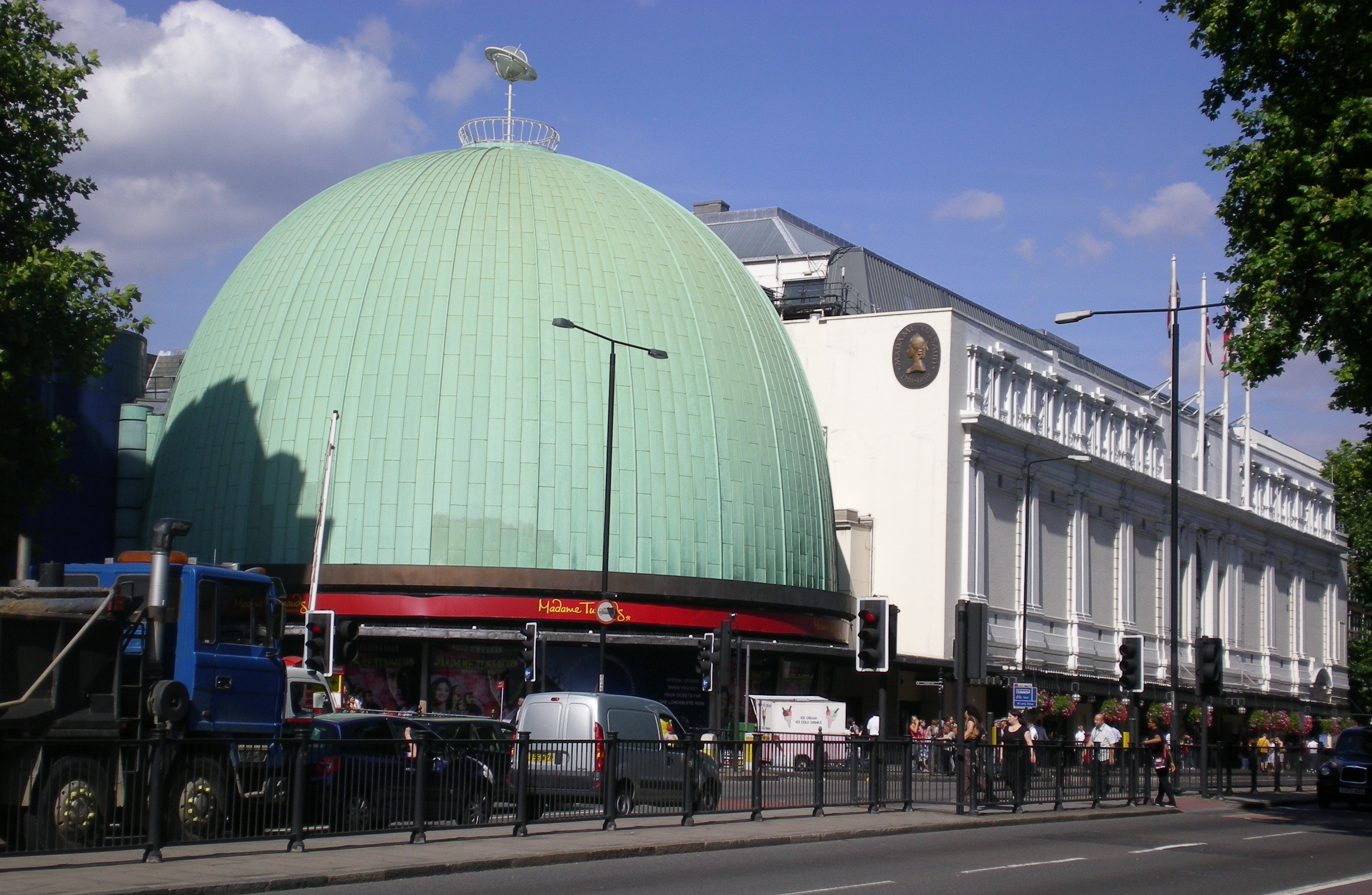
- Madame Tussauds has included the former London Planetarium (large dome to the left) since 2006.
- Established: 22 May 1835 (191 years ago)
- Location: Marylebone Road, City of Westminster, London, England
- Founder: Marie Tussaud
- Website: www.madametussauds.com/london/

Madame Tussauds (UK: /tuːˈsɔːdz/ too-SAWDZ, US: /tuːˈsoʊz/ too-SOHZ) (Note: The family themselves pronounce it /ˈtuːsoʊ/.) is a wax museum founded in London in 1835 by the French wax sculptor Marie Tussaud. One of the early main attractions was the Chamber of Horrors, which appeared in advertising in 1843.

In 1883, the restricted space of the original Baker Street site prompted Tussaud's grandson (Joseph Randall) to commission the building at its current London location on Marylebone Road. The new exhibition galleries were opened on 14 July 1884 and were a great success. Madame Tussaud & Sons was incorporated as a private limited company (Ltd.) in 1889.

A major tourist attraction in London since the Victorian era, Madame Tussauds displays the waxworks of famous and historical figures, as well as popular film and television characters played by famous actors. Operated by the British entertainment company Merlin Entertainments, the museum now has locations in cities across four continents, with the first overseas branch opening in Amsterdam in 1970.

== History ==
=== Background ===
Marie Tussaud was born as Marie Grosholtz in 1761 in Strasbourg, France. Her mother worked for Philippe Curtius in Bern, Switzerland; he was a physician skilled in wax modelling. Curtius taught Tussaud the art of wax modeling when she was a child; when he moved to Paris, Marie and her mother followed. Grosholtz created her first wax sculpture, of Voltaire, in 1777. At 17, according to her memoirs, she became art tutor to Madame Elizabeth, the sister of King Louis XVI. During the French Revolution, she was imprisoned for three months, but was subsequently released. During the Revolution, she made models of many prominent victims.

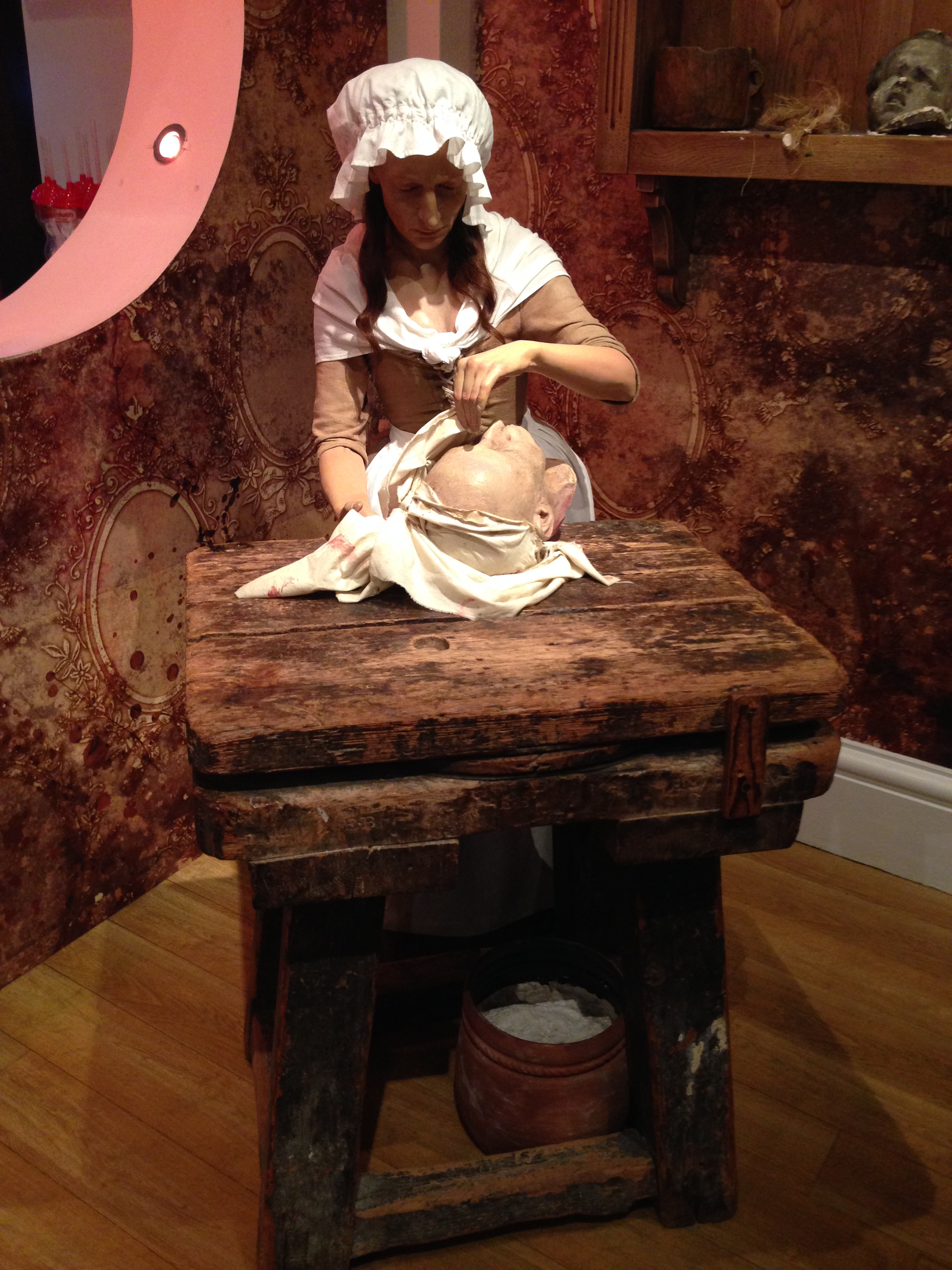
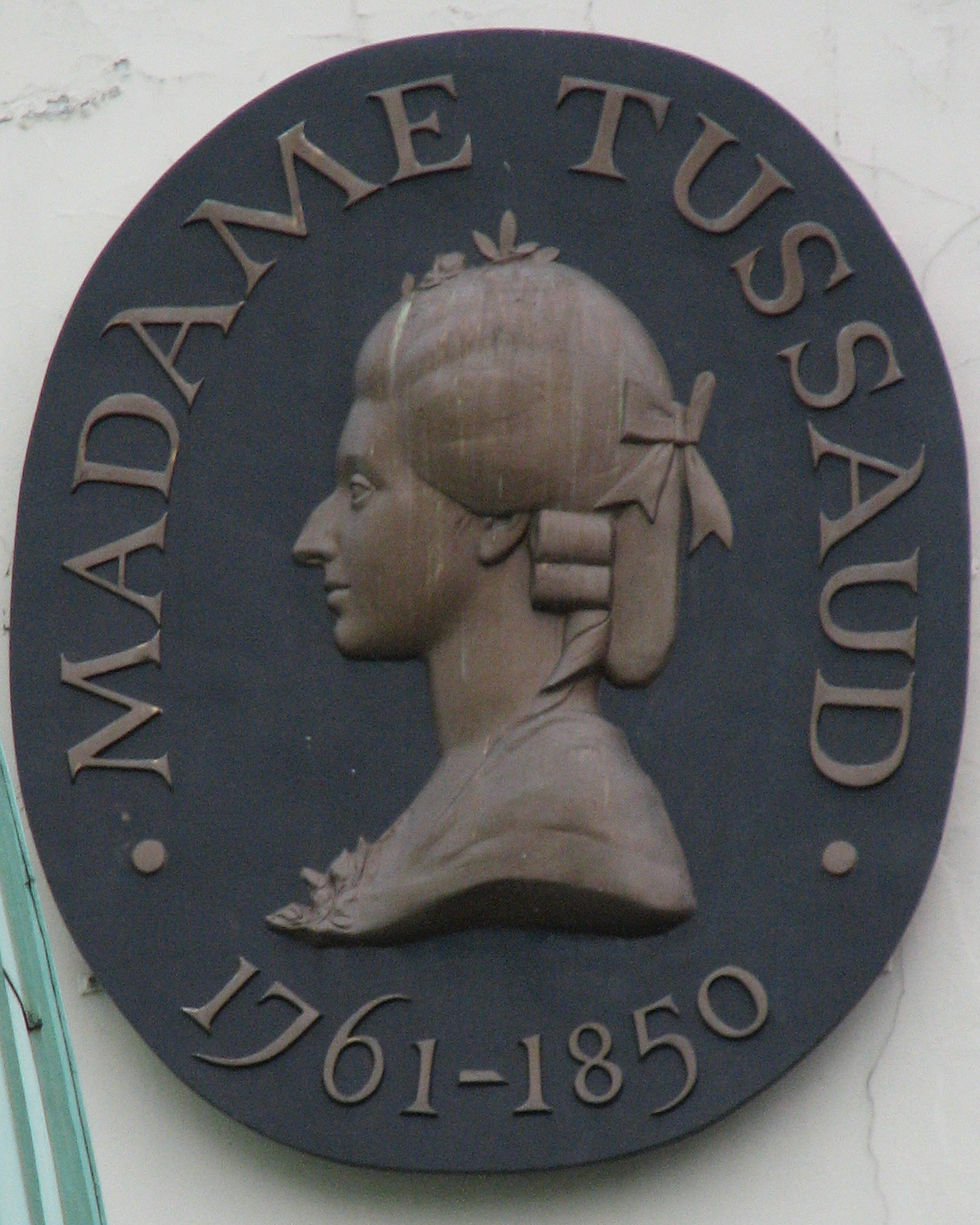
Left: Waxwork of Marie Tussaud (sculpting a waxwork) and right: her memorial plaque at the wax museum she founded in London

Grosholtz inherited Curtius' vast collection of wax models following his death in 1794. For the next 33 years, she travelled around Europe with a touring show from the collection. She married François Tussaud in 1795, took his surname, and renamed her show as Madame Tussaud's. In 1802, she accepted an invitation from lantern and phantasmagoria pioneer Paul Philidor to exhibit her work alongside his show at the Lyceum Theatre, London. A wave of creativity was in vogue in London the year Tussaud arrived in the city, with new West End stage plays which included the first to be called a melodrama, the first appearance of Joseph Grimaldi in his whiteface clown character, and poet William Wordsworth's poem "Composed upon Westminster Bridge, 3 September 1802" describing London and the Thames. Adding her own creativity to the mix, Tussaud brought with her all her death masks, wax faces and busts. Complaining that Philidor failed to promote her, Tussaud then decided to go into business alone.

Unable to return to France because of the Napoleonic Wars, she travelled throughout Great Britain and Ireland exhibiting her collection and made her home in London. From 1831, she took a series of short leases on the upper floor of "Baker Street Bazaar" (on the west side of Baker Street, Dorset Street, and King Street in London). This site was later featured in the Druce-Portland case sequence of trials of 1898–1907. This became Tussaud's first permanent home in 1836.

=== Origins ===
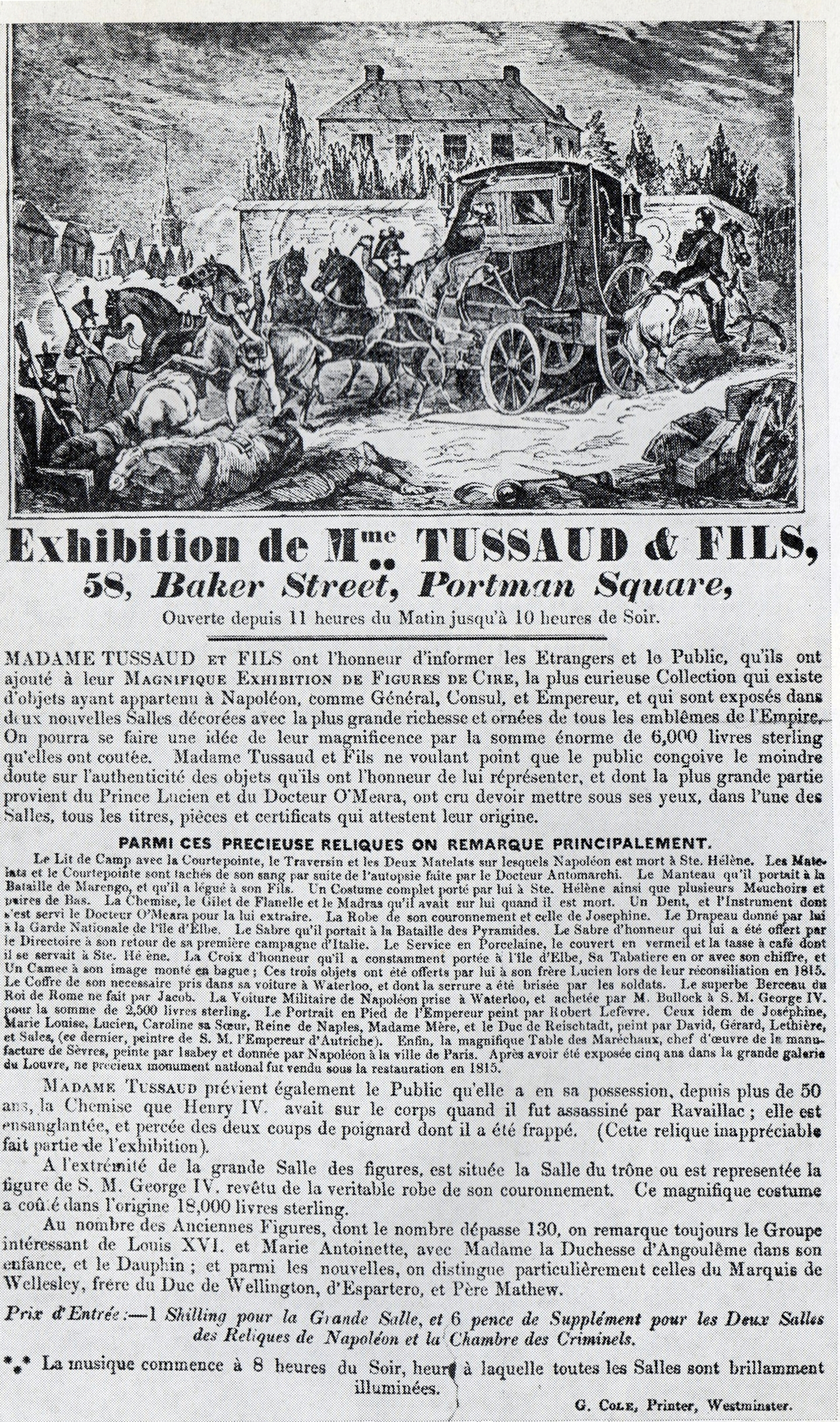
Poster for the Tussaud wax figures exhibition, Baker Street, London, 1835

By 1835, Marie Tussaud had settled down in Baker Street and opened a museum. One of its main attractions was the Chamber of Horrors. The name is often credited to a contributor to Punch in 1845, but Tussaud appears to have originated it herself, using it in advertising as early as 1843. On its impact, Oliver Smith of The Telegraph writes, "Londoners flocked to see the likes of Nelson and Sir Walter Scott, but the highlight was undoubtedly the Chamber of Horrors, where Tussaud displayed models of murderers." Other famous people added to the museum include the Duke of Wellington, Henry VIII, and Queen Victoria.

The early commercial success of Madame Tussaud's saw it establish itself as a brand, and the museum became a pioneer in innovating various forms of publicity when the advertising industry was in its infancy. The Hall of Fame attraction enthralled the public of Victorian London, and inclusion in it was definitive proof one had attained celebrity status.

In these days, no one can be considered positively popular, unless he is admitted into the company of Madame Tussaud's celebrities in Baker Street. The only way in which a powerful and lasting impression can be made on the public mind, is through the medium of wax. You must be a doll in Baker Street before you can become the I-dol(l) of the multitude. Madame Tussaud has become, in fact, the only dispenser of permanent reputation.

— "The Tussaud Test of Popularity", Punch, 1849.

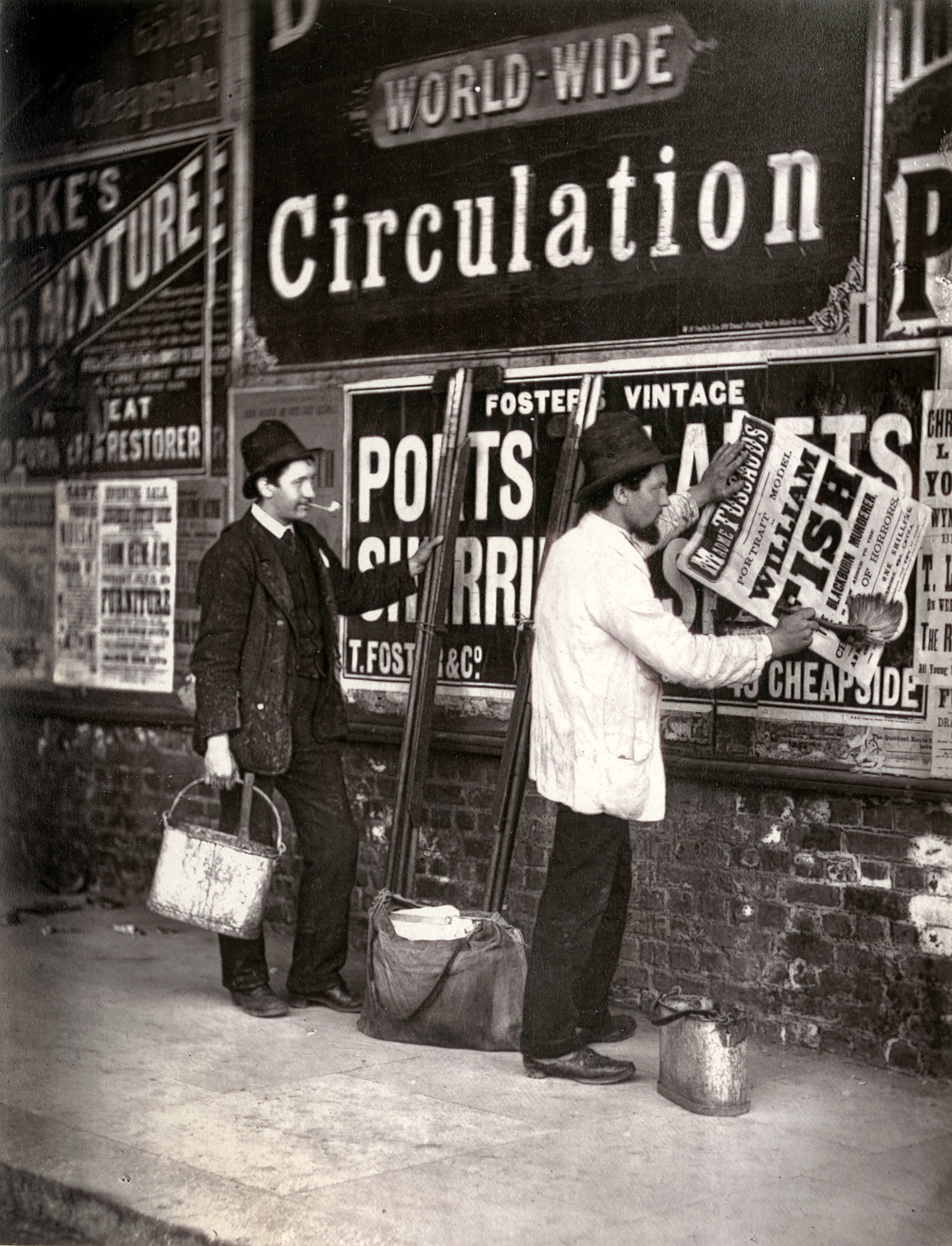
Advertising man pasting a bill for Madame Tussaud's Chamber of Horrors, London, 1877

Other businesses in Baker Street profited from being near Madame Tussaud's, and in 1860, Charles Dickens hailed the museum as one of London's most popular entertainments, writing in All the Year Round: "Madame Tussaud's is something more than an exhibition, it is an institution". A waxwork of Dickens appeared at the museum in 1873, three years after his death. Some sculptures still exist that were made by Marie Tussaud herself. The gallery originally contained some 400 different figures, but fire damage in 1925 coupled with bombs during the Blitz on London in 1941, severely damaged most of such older models. The casts themselves have survived, allowing the historical waxworks to be remade, and these can be seen in the museum's history exhibit. The oldest figure on display is that of Madame du Barry, the work of Curtius from 1765 and part of the waxworks left to Grosholtz at his death. Other faces from the time of Tussaud include Robespierre and George III. In 1842, she made a self-portrait, which is now on display at the entrance of her museum. She died in her sleep in London on 16 April 1850.

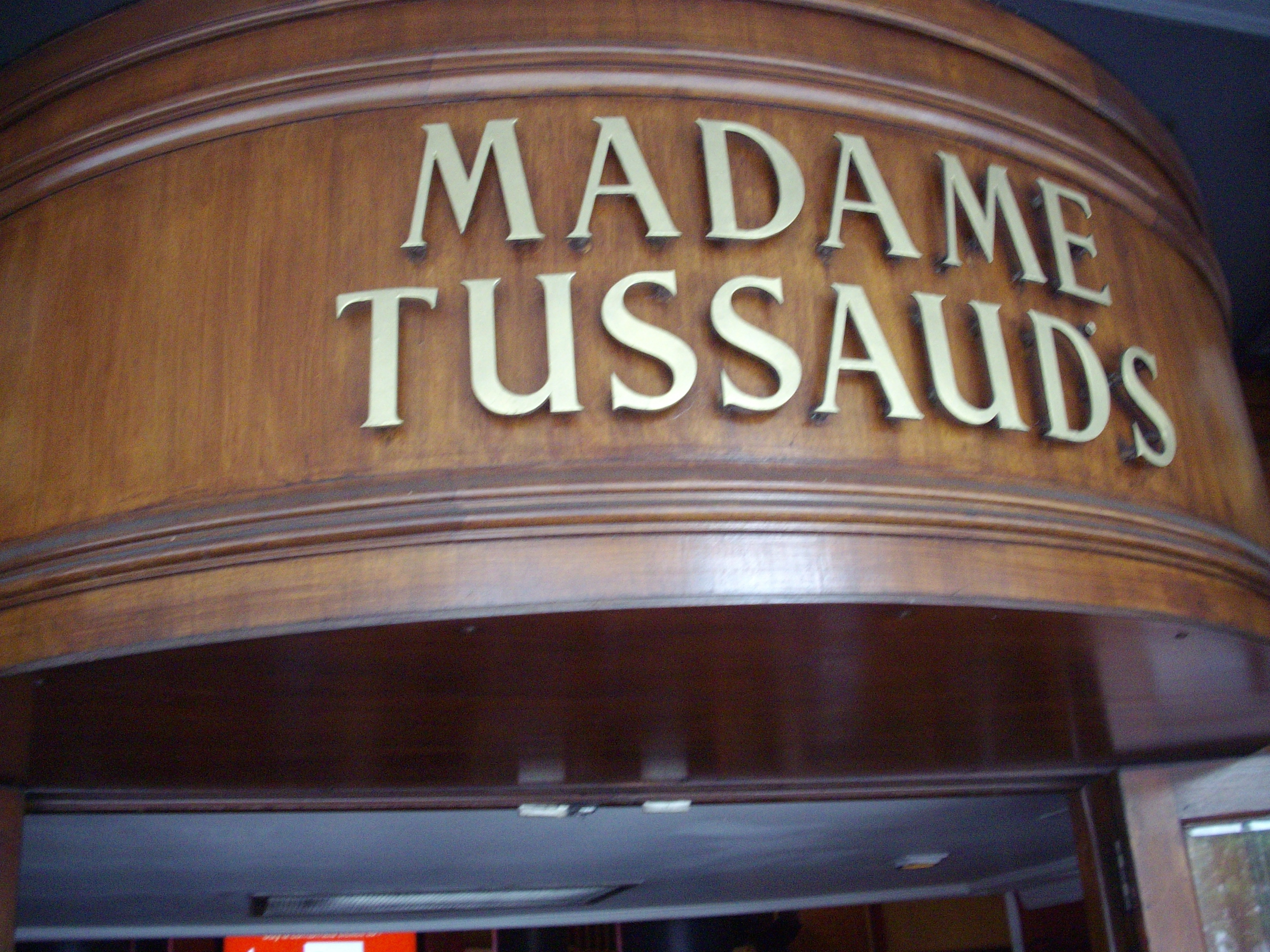
Entrance sign in London

By 1883, the restricted space and rising cost of the Baker Street site prompted her grandson Joseph Randall to commission construction of a building at the museum's current location on Marylebone Road. The new exhibition galleries were opened on 14 July 1884 and were a great success. But Randall had bought out his cousin Louisa's half-share in the business in 1881, and that plus the building costs resulted in his having too little capital. He formed a limited company in 1888 to attract fresh capital but it had to be dissolved after disagreements between the family shareholders. In February 1889, Tussaud's was sold to a group of businessmen led by Edwin Josiah Poyser. Tussaud's great-grandson, John Theodore Tussaud, continued in his role as the museum's manager and chief artist. The first wax sculpture of a young Winston Churchill was made in 1908; a total of ten have been made since.

=== Expansion ===
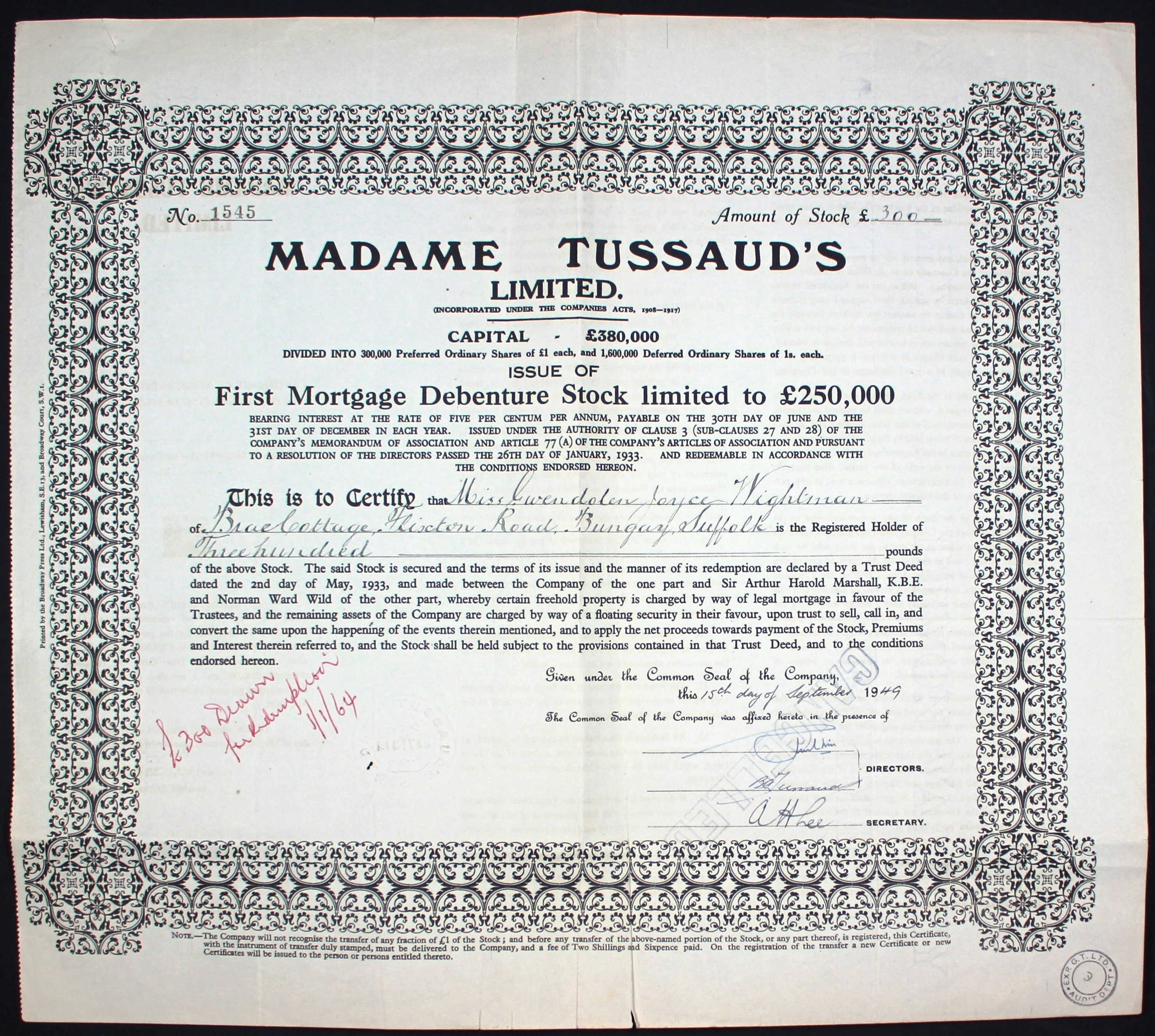
First Mortgage Debenture Stock of Madame Tussaud's Ltd., issued 15 September 1949

In 1926, Madame Tussauds became a limited company. In 1949, the company issued a First Mortgage Debenture Stock with Sir Arthur Marshall among the signatories. In the 1960s, Tussauds was looking to expand beyond the UK and in 1970 opened their first international exhibition in Amsterdam. In 1978, Madame Tussauds was acquired by S. Pearson and Son, now Pearson plc. The company had been seeking to expand beyond their own attractions before acquiring the group. Chessington Zoo (now Chessington World of Adventures) in southwest London was already owned by Pearson and it became a Tussauds attraction after the buyout. In 1989, the company opened Madame Tussaud's Rock Circus, an exhibition held at the London Pavilion celebrating the history of rock and pop music featuring its major figures recreated in wax. In 1997, the museum in London attracted 2.79 million visitors, more than the Tower of London. In 1999, the company opened its first US site in Las Vegas. Its success led the company to look for another exhibition location in the US, with the New York site opening the following year. In 1999, after being part of Pearson for twenty years, Charterhouse Development Capital acquired the group. The new company bought in new management and sought to increase profits while continuing the company's growth. In 2000, the London Eye launched, in which Tussauds had a 33% stake, and managed by Tussauds the site soon became one of the UK's most popular attractions.

In 2005, Madame Tussauds was sold to a company in Dubai, Dubai International Capital, for £800m (US$1.5bn). In May 2007, The Blackstone Group purchased The Tussauds Group from then-owner Dubai International Capital for US$1.9 billion; the company was merged with Blackstone's Merlin Entertainments and operation of Madame Tussauds was taken over by Merlin. After the Tussauds acquisition, Dubai International Capital gained 20% of Merlin Entertainment. On 16 July 2007, as part of the financing for the Tussauds deal, Blackstone and Prestbury, the investment firm of Nick Leslau, announced a sale and leaseback covering the Madame Tussauds London site and three other Merlin properties for a total of £622 million, with the properties leased back to Merlin on 35-year renewable leases. The freehold of the London site was sold again in 2015, to the Taiwanese insurer Fubon Life, and Merlin continues to operate the attraction under its lease.

=== Recent status ===
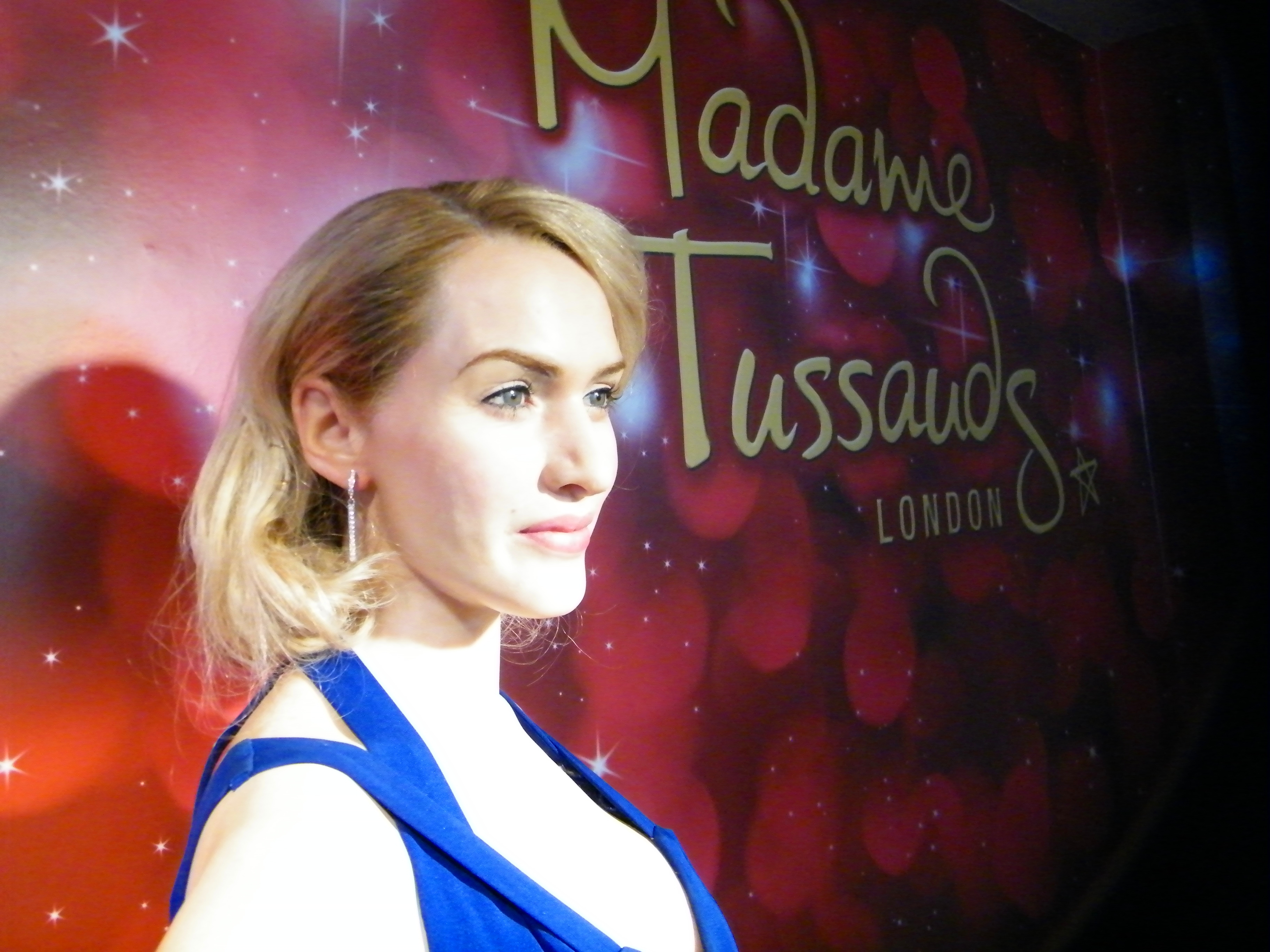
Madame Tussauds logo (spelled without the apostrophe) next to a waxwork of Kate Winslet in London

Madame Tussaud's wax museum has been a major tourist attraction in London since it opened in the 1830s, an era viewed as being when the city's tourism industry began. In 2006 it incorporated the London Planetarium to its west wing. A large animated dark ride, The Spirit of London, opened in 1993. Today's wax figures at Tussauds include historical and royal figures, film stars, sports stars, and famous murderers. It has been known since 2007 as "Madame Tussauds" museums (no apostrophe). In 2009, a 5 1/2 inches (14 cm) waxwork of Tinker Bell (the fairy from J. M. Barrie's Peter Pan) became the museum's smallest figure of all time when it was unveiled in London.

In July 2008, Madame Tussauds' Berlin branch became embroiled in controversy when a 41-year-old German man brushed past two guards and decapitated a wax figure depicting Adolf Hitler. This was believed to be an act of protest against showing the ruthless dictator alongside sports heroes, movie stars, and other historical figures. The statue has since been repaired, and the perpetrator has admitted that he attacked the statue to win a bet. The original model of Hitler was unveiled in Madame Tussauds London in April 1933; it was frequently vandalised and a 1936 replacement had to be carefully guarded. In January 2016, the statue of Hitler was removed from the Chamber of Horrors section in the London museum in response to an open letter sent by a staff writer of The Jewish Journal of Greater Los Angeles, followed by significant support for its removal from social media.

The first Madame Tussauds in India opened in New Delhi on 1 December 2017. Its operator, Merlin Entertainments, planned an investment of 50 million pounds over the next 10 years. It features over 50 wax models, including political and entertainment figures such as Ariana Grande, Amitabh Bachchan, Salman Khan, Katrina Kaif, Sachin Tendulkar, Kim Kardashian, Tom Cruise, Leonardo DiCaprio, Scarlett Johansson, Angelina Jolie, Asha Bhosle, Kapil Dev, and Mary Kom. On 30 December 2020, the holding company of Madame Tussauds in Delhi confirmed a temporary shutdown of the museum. It reopened in 2022.

== Locations ==
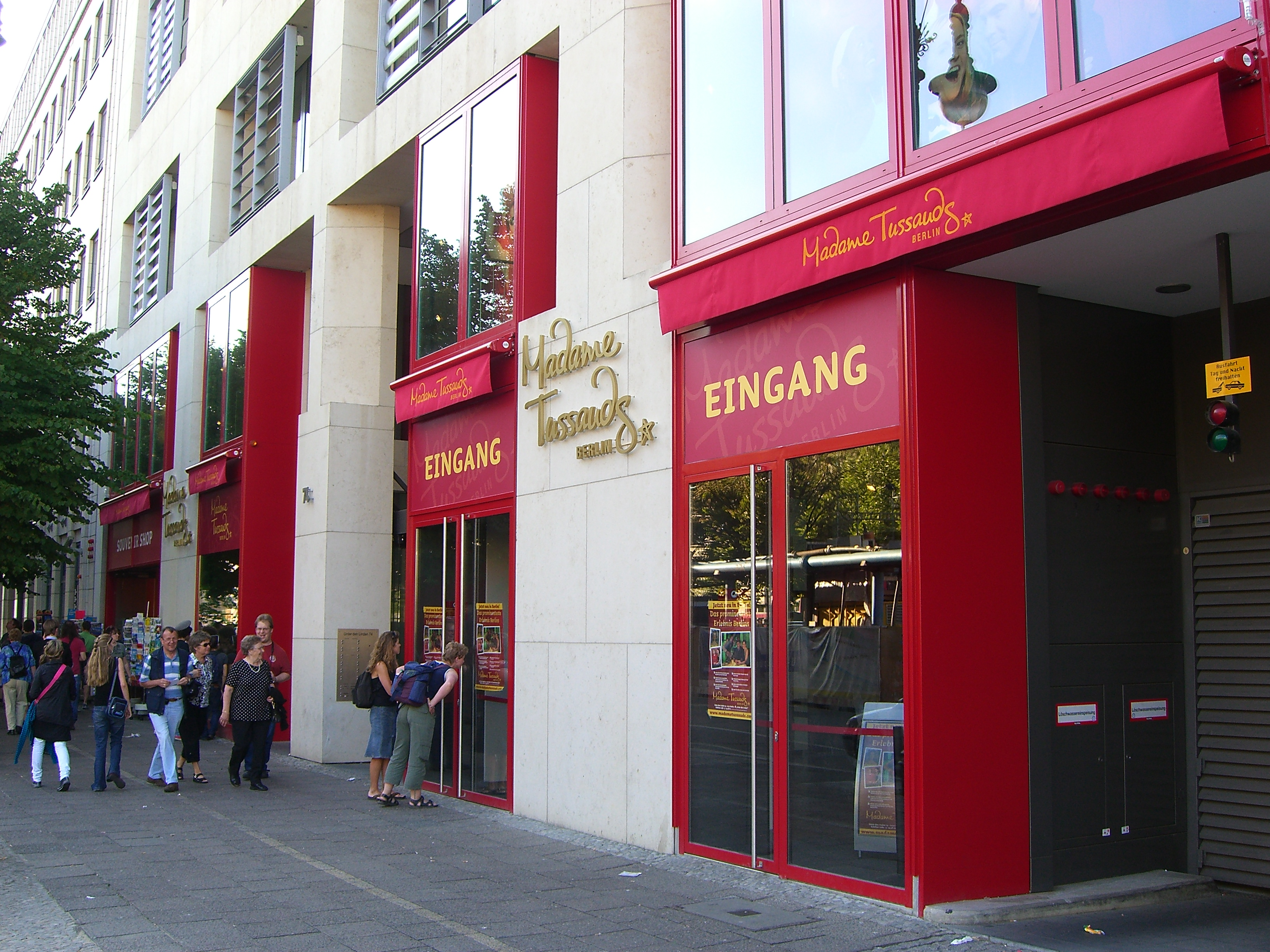
Entry of Madame Tussauds in Berlin

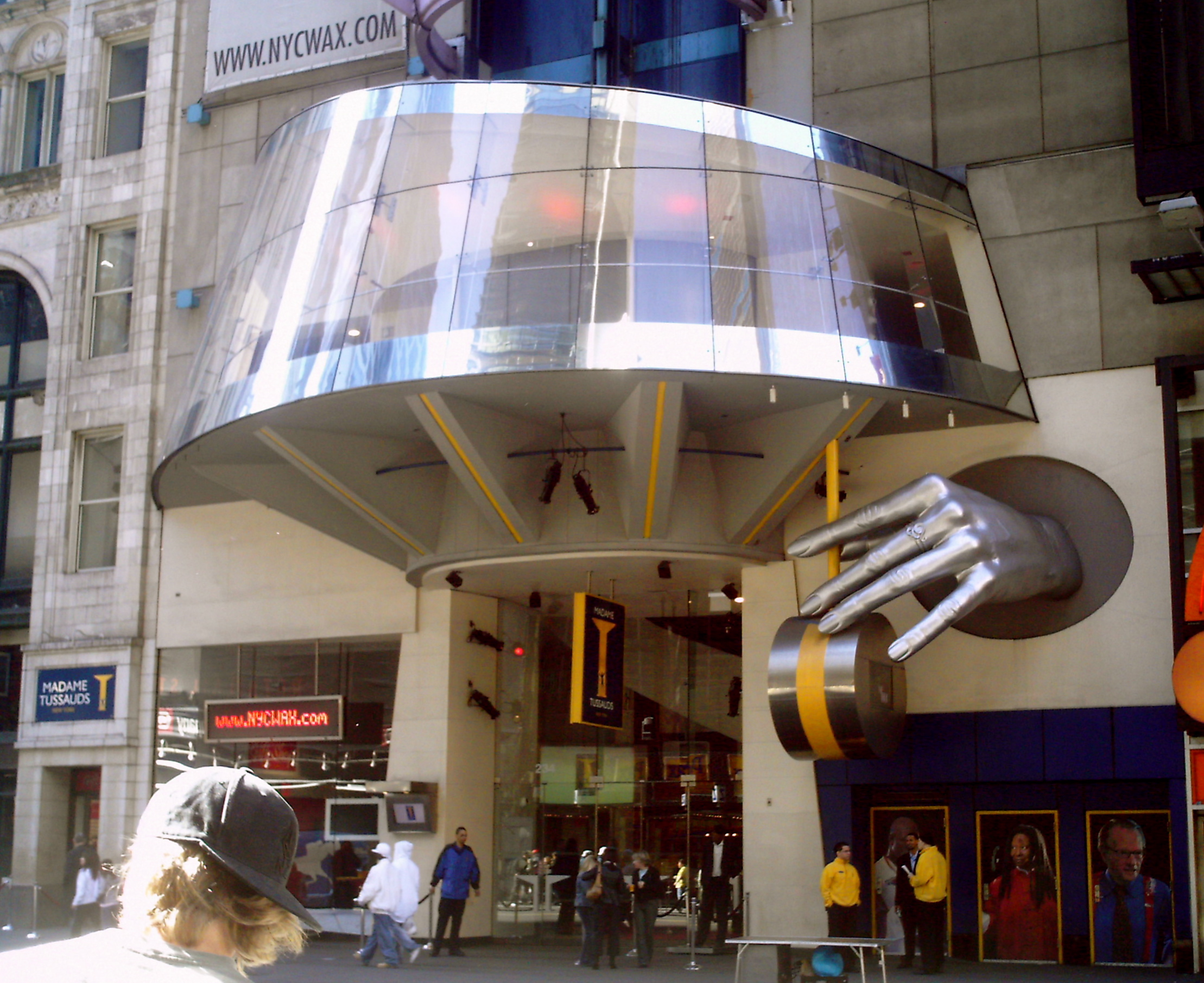
Madame Tussauds in New York City opened in 2000.

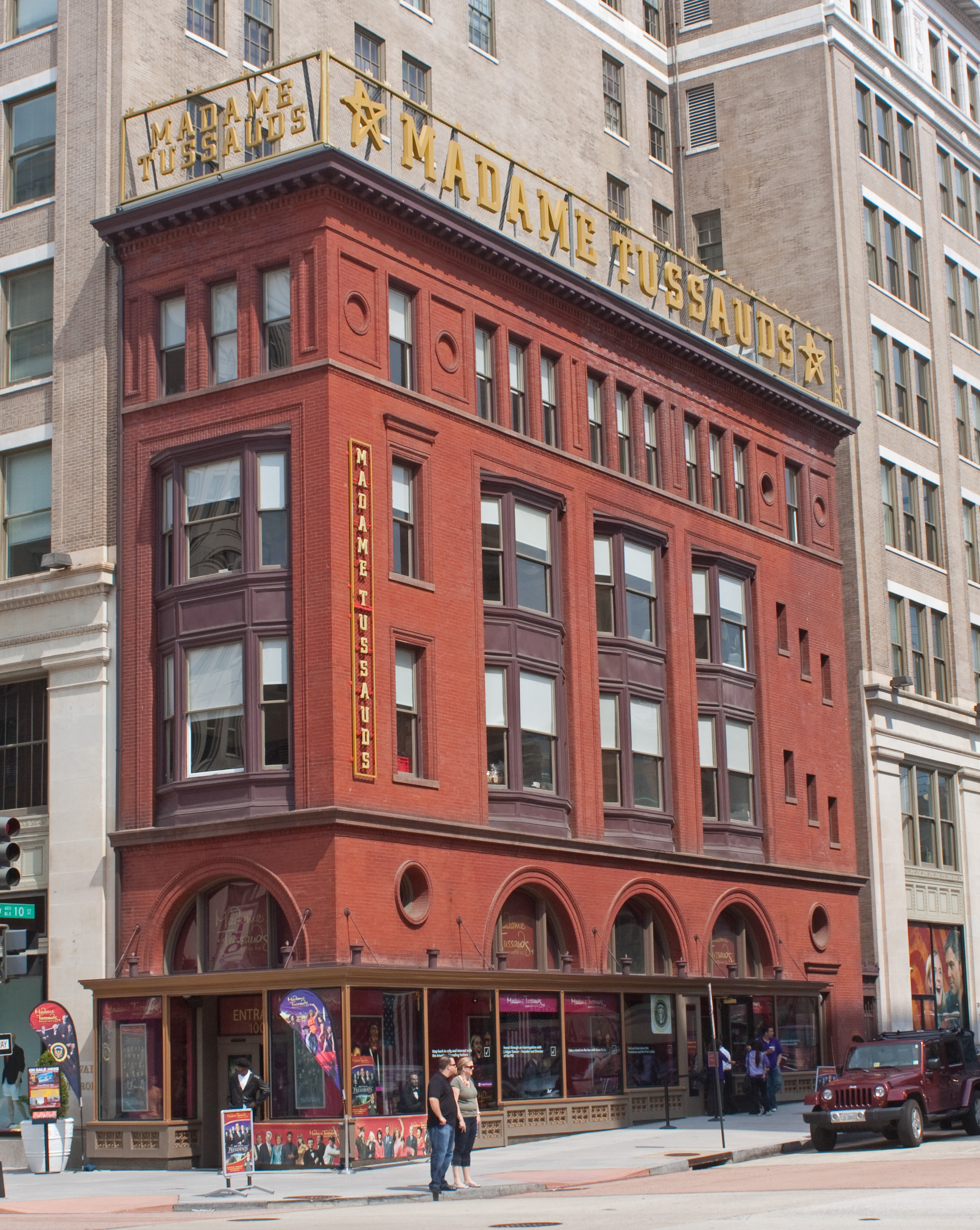
Madame Tussauds opened in Washington, D.C., in 2007.

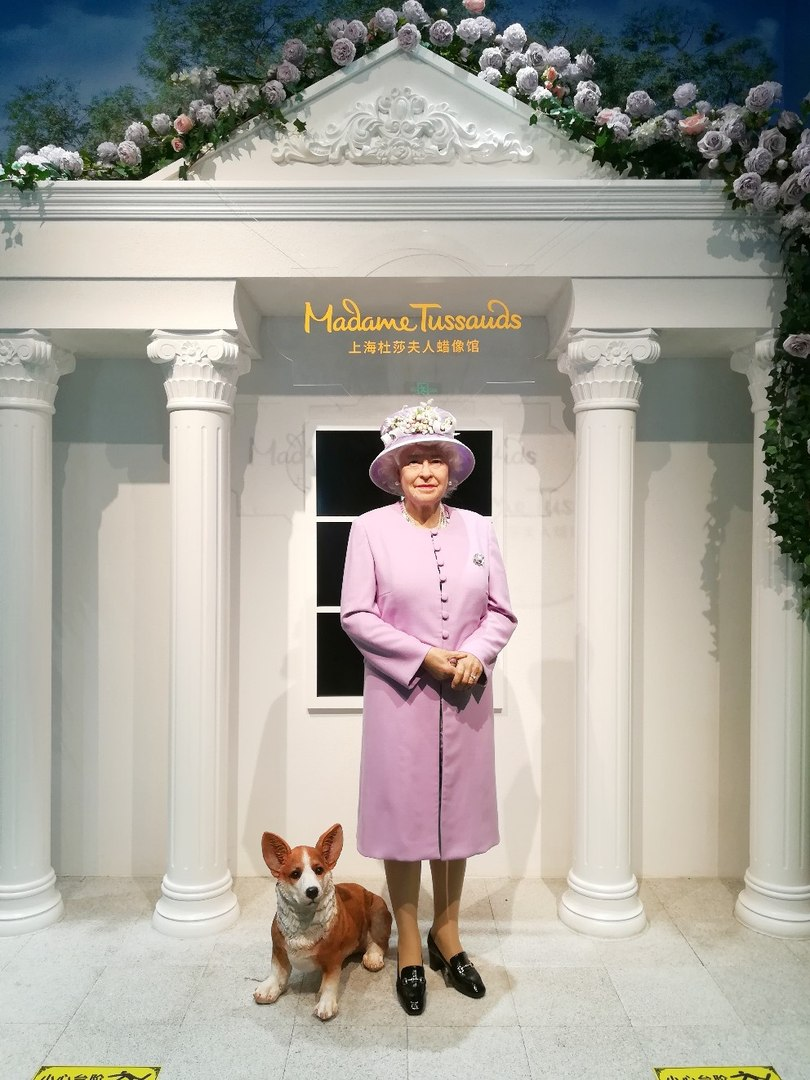
Madame Tussauds in Shanghai, China, displaying a wax figure of Queen Elizabeth II, opened in 2006.

=== Asia ===
- Hong Kong (2000)
- Shanghai, China (2006)
- Bangkok, Thailand (2010)
- Wuhan, China (2013)
- Singapore (2014)
- Dubai, United Arab Emirates (2021)

=== Europe ===
- London, United Kingdom (1835)
- Amsterdam, Netherlands (1970)
- Berlin, Germany (2008)
- Vienna, Austria (2011)
- Blackpool, United Kingdom (2011)
- Prague, Czech Republic (2019)
- Budapest, Hungary (2023)

=== North America ===
- Las Vegas, United States (1999)
- New York City, United States (2000)
- Hollywood, United States (2009)
- Orlando, United States (2015)
- Nashville, United States (2017)

=== Oceania ===
- Sydney, Australia (2012)

=== Former locations ===
- Tokyo, Japan (2013–2026)
- Beijing, China (2014–2025)
- Chongqing, China (2016–2025)
- Delhi, India (2017–2020); relocated to Noida (2022–2023)
- Istanbul, Turkey (2016–2024)
- San Francisco, United States (2014–2024)
- Washington, D.C., United States (2007–2021)

Marie Tussaud's great-grandson, Louis Tussaud, later established his own, now closed, waxwork exhibitions in England. Today, Ripley Entertainment operates attractions using the Louis Tussaud name in Niagara Falls, Ontario; San Antonio, Texas; Grand Prairie, Texas; Newport, Oregon; and Pattaya, Thailand. These attractions are separate and distinct from the Madame Tussauds chain.

== In popular culture ==
=== Celebrity poses with their wax figures ===
Celebrities have often posed like their wax figures as pranks and publicity stunts:

- On 3 November 2009, the museum's New York City branch was featured in a segment on NBC's Today in which weatherman Al Roker posed in place of his lifelike wax figure for two hours and startled unsuspecting visitors, who were at first led to believe they were viewing Roker's wax counterpart.
- In 2012, One Direction posed as their statues in the London museum, as a prank for the TV series Surprise Surprise.
- NBA players Carmelo Anthony and Jeremy Lin pranked fans during the unveiling of their statues at the New York and San Francisco museums, respectively.
- In 2015, Arnold Schwarzenegger posed as the Terminator statue in the Hollywood museum, to promote a charity event.
- Ant and Dec pranked Olly Murs by tricking him into using a machine that will "scan every part of Olly's face and body to create the most accurate wax figure ever" as a part of their annual Undercover segment on their ITV show, Ant & Dec's Saturday Night Takeaway.

=== Music ===
- Madame Tussauds is the focus of Steve Taylor's song "Meltdown (at Madame Tussauds)", which describes someone turning up the thermostat and causing the wax figures to melt. Taylor wrote the song as "a new metaphor to ask [the] same question" as Jesus, "What good is it for a man to gain the whole world, yet forfeit his soul?"
- The Beatles had their wax figures featured along with cardboard cutouts of various famous people in the cover art for Sgt. Pepper's Lonely Hearts Club Band (1967).
- Several sculptures from the London branch (including George W. Bush and Tony Blair) appear in the 2004 music video "Pop!ular" by singer-songwriter Darren Hayes.
- Madame Tussauds sculptures are used on the cover of Rick Wakeman's album The Six Wives of Henry VIII. A waxwork of Richard Nixon also appears in the background.

== Gallery ==
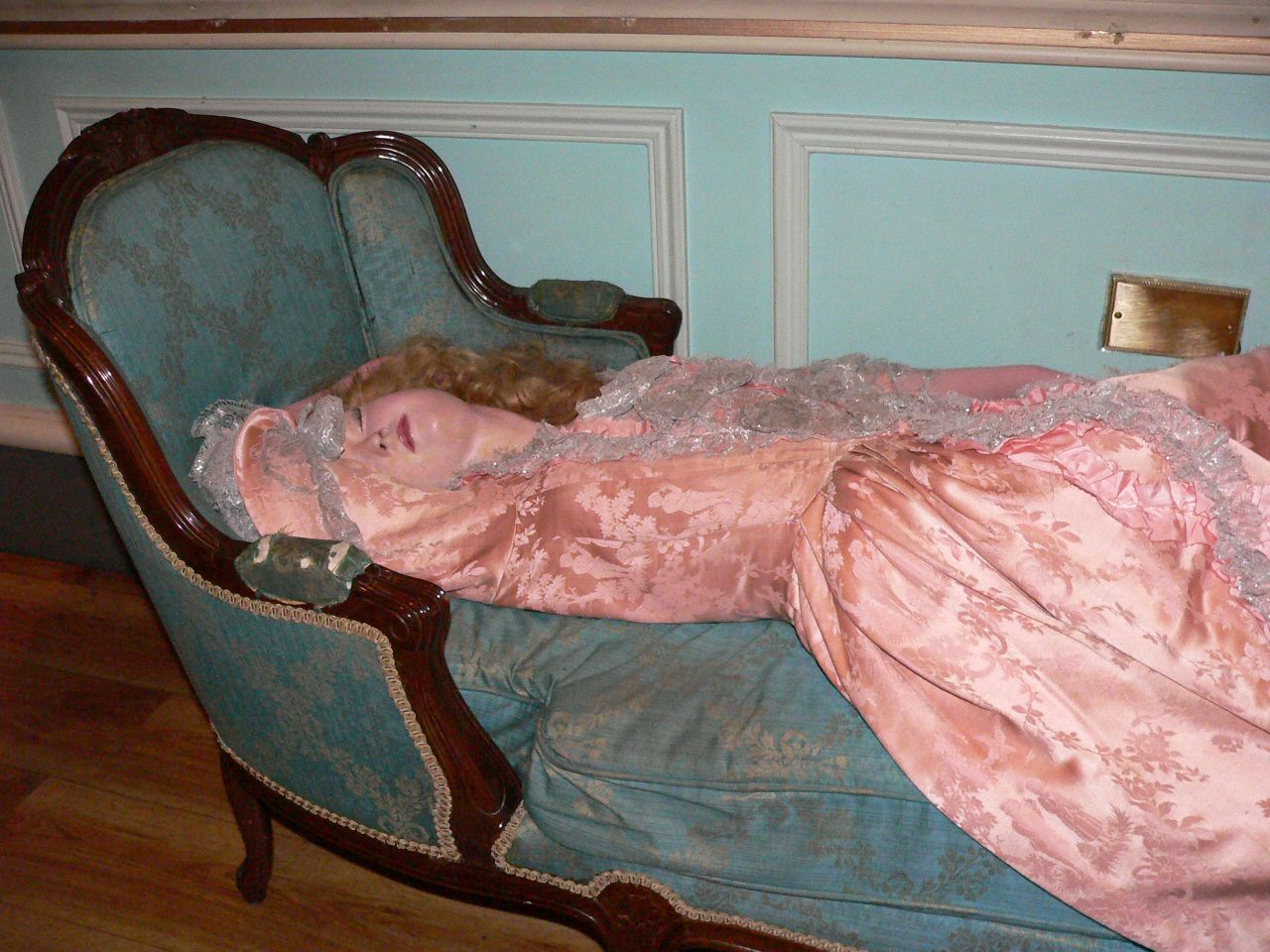
The Sleeping Beauty is the oldest existing figure on display. It was modelled after Madame du Barry. She appears asleep and a device in her chest makes it seem as if she were breathing.

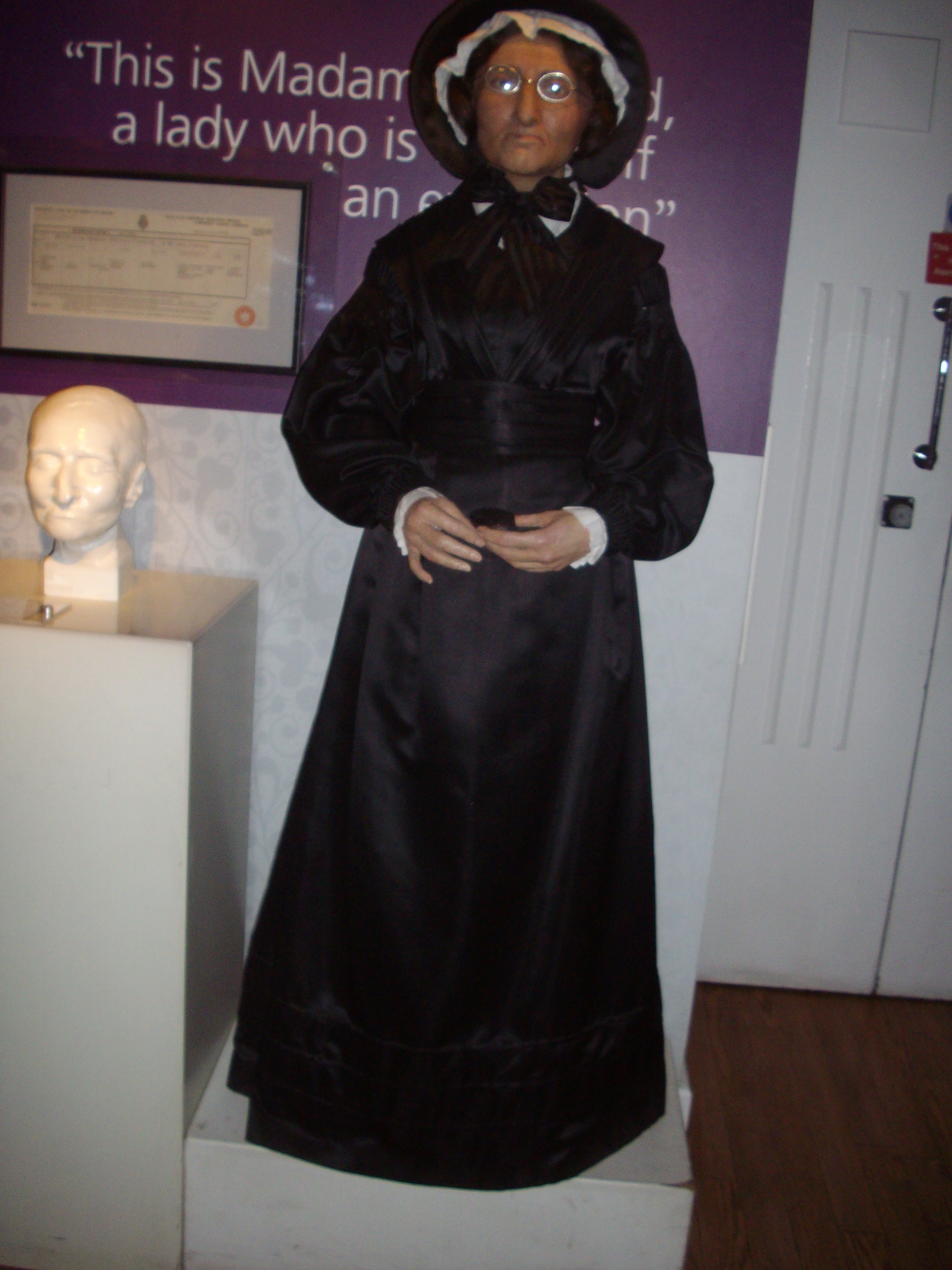
Madame Tussaud herself at Madame Tussauds in London. Her death mask is visible in the background on the left.

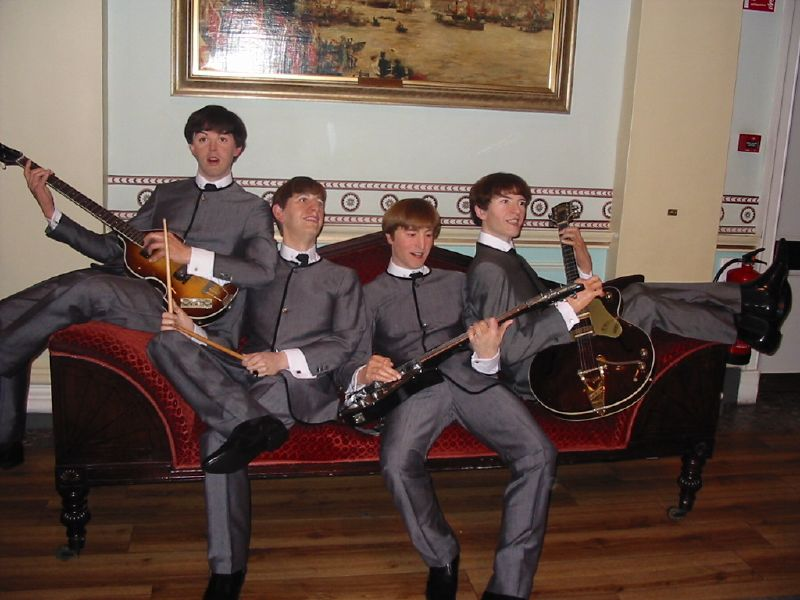
The Beatles

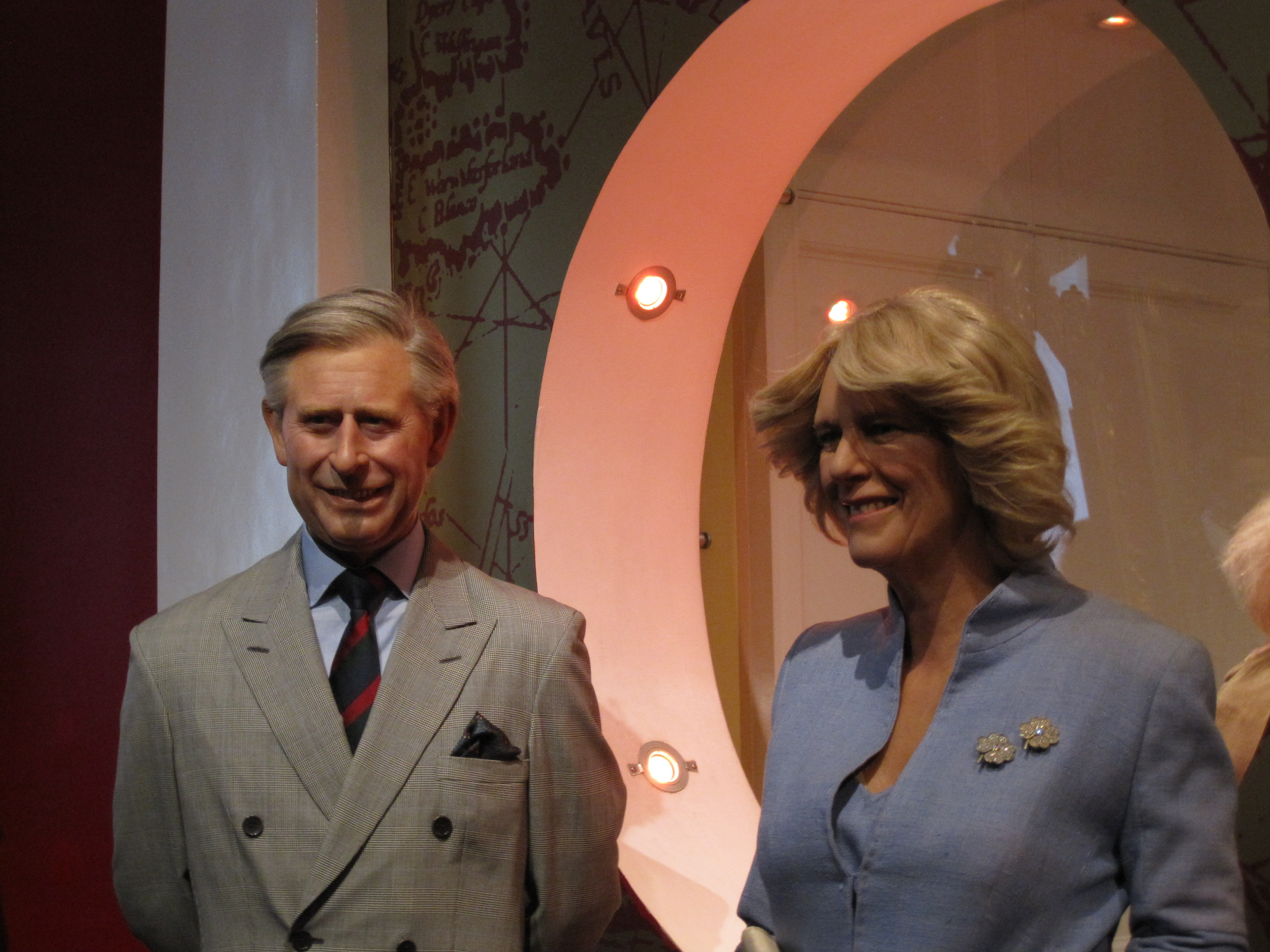
King Charles III and Queen Camilla

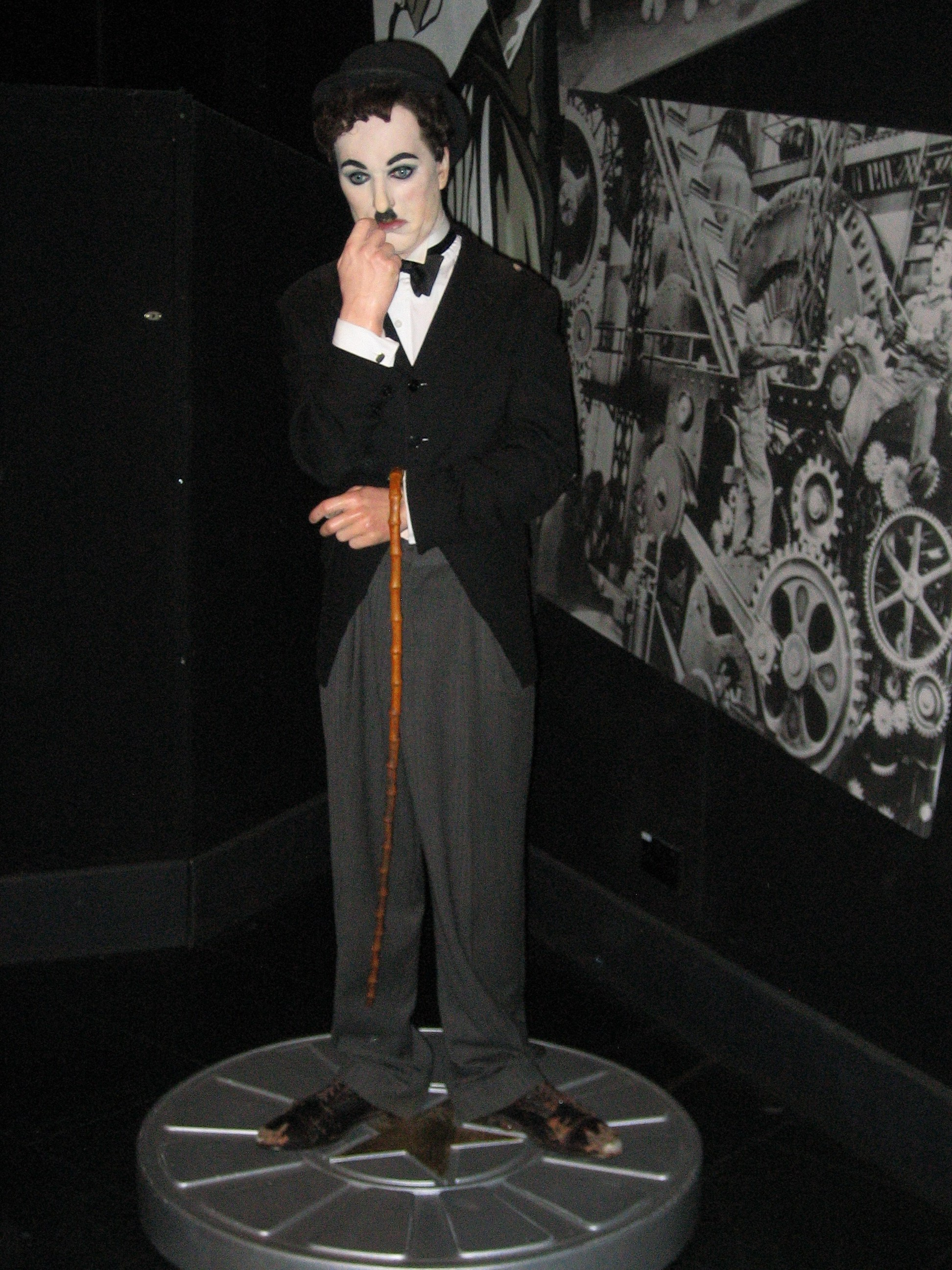
Charlie Chaplin

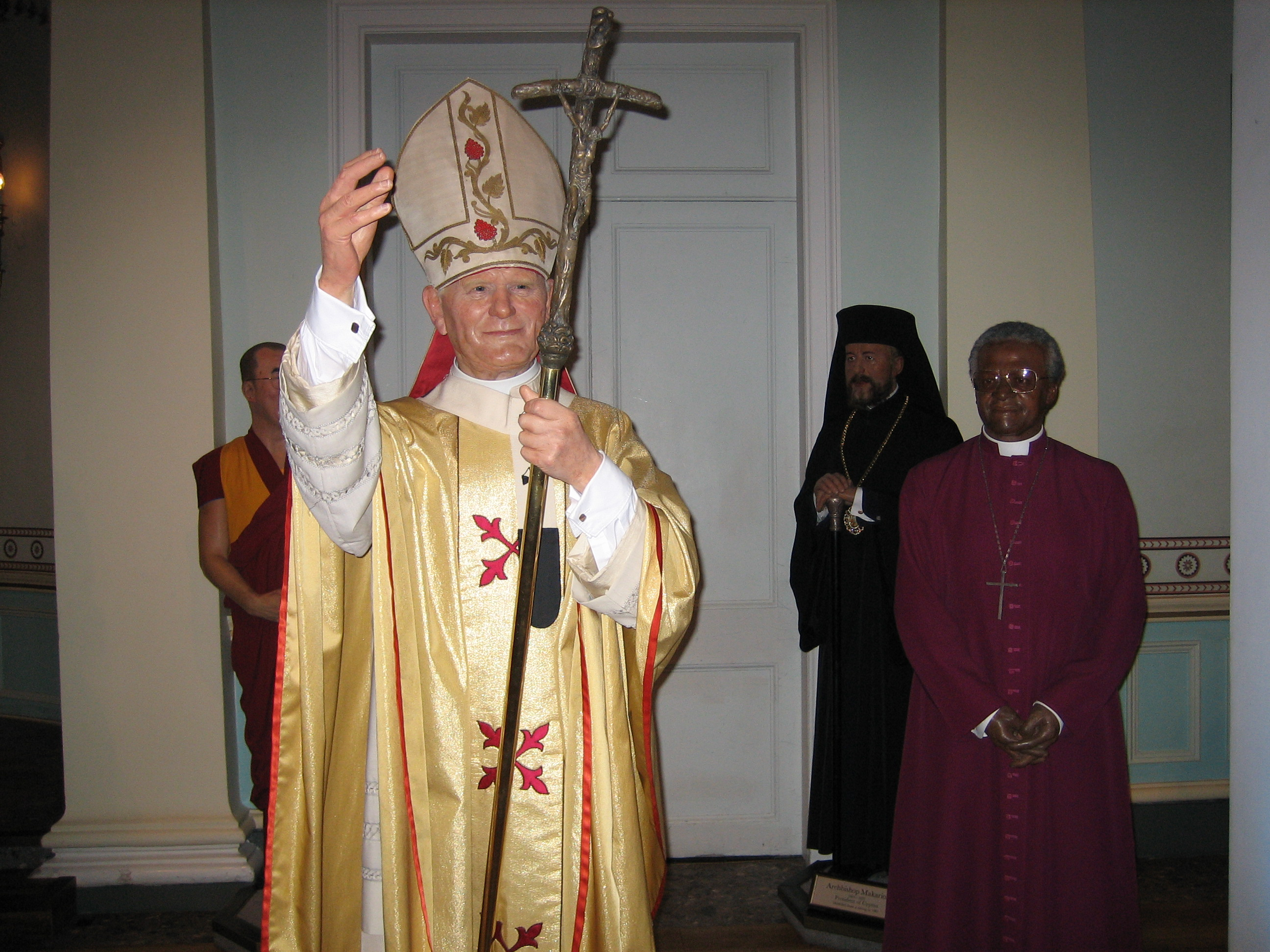
Pope John Paul II, Archbishop Desmond Tutu, the Dalai Lama, and Archbishop Makarios III

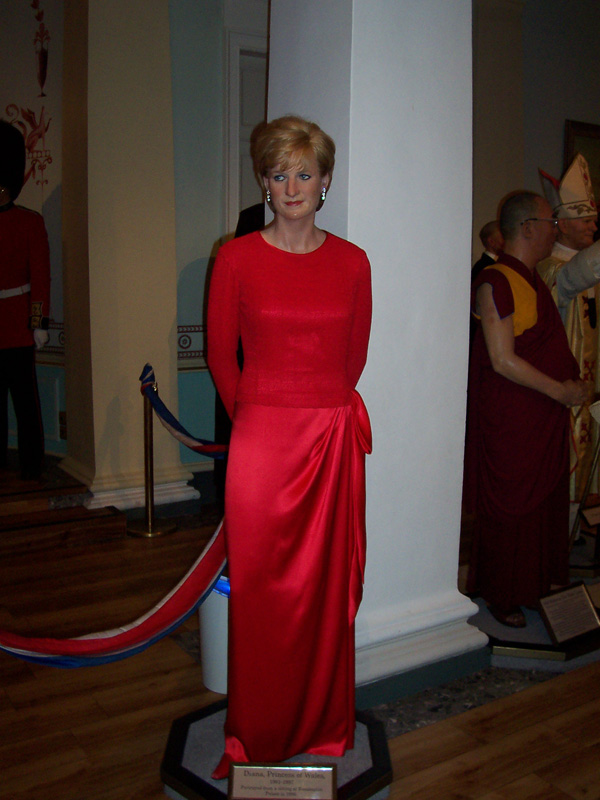
Diana, Princess of Wales

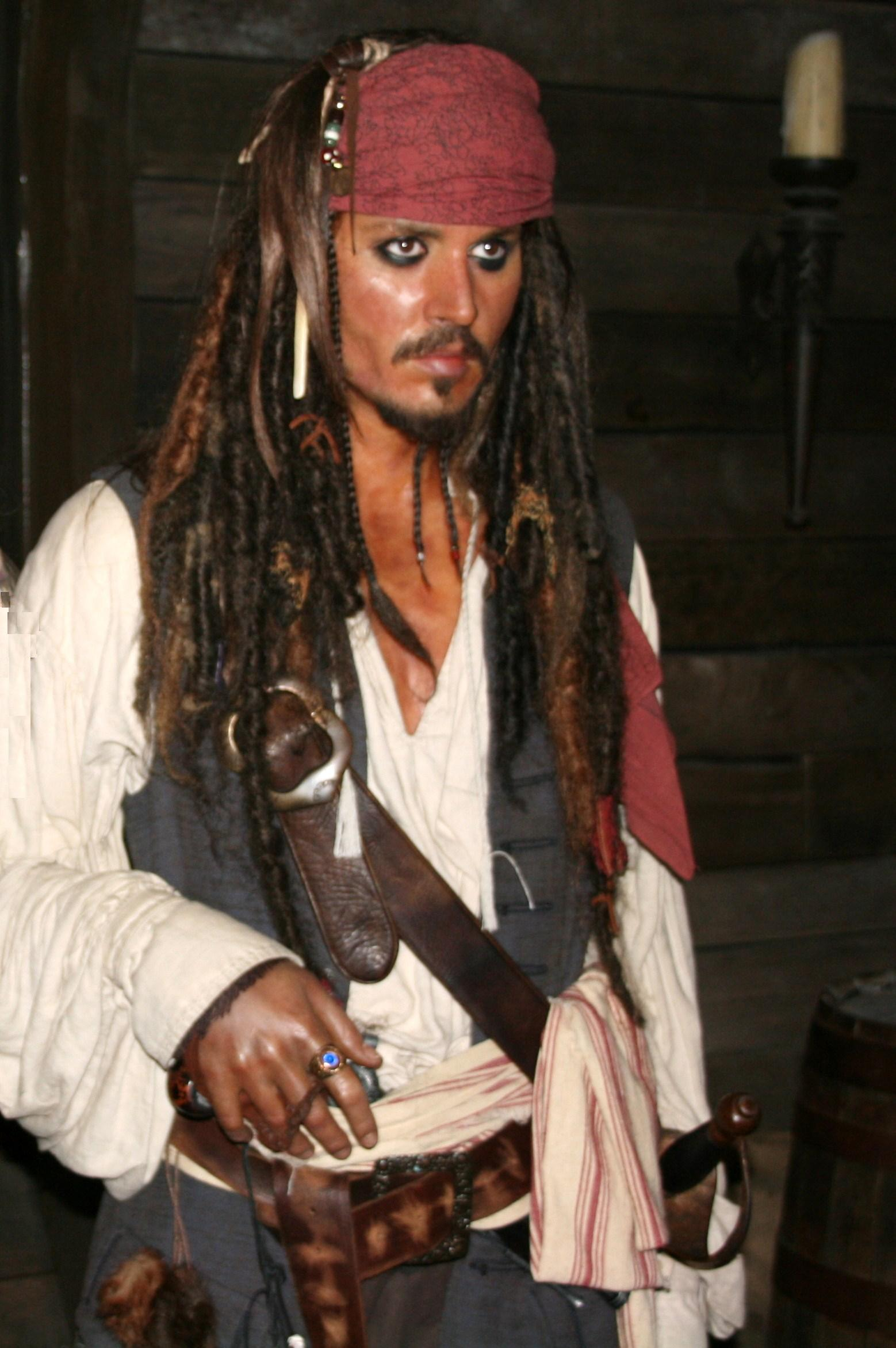
Johnny Depp as Jack Sparrow

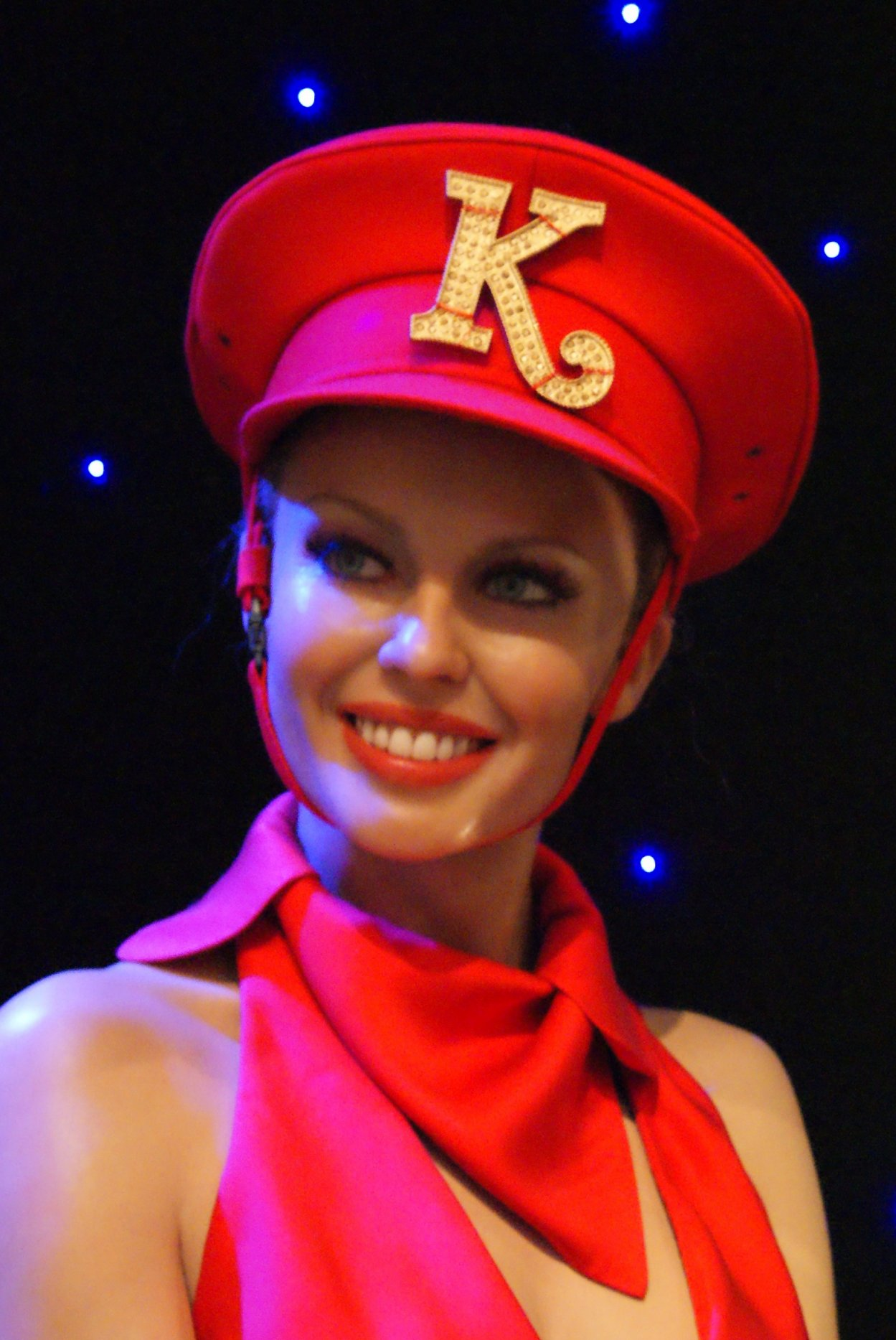
Kylie Minogue

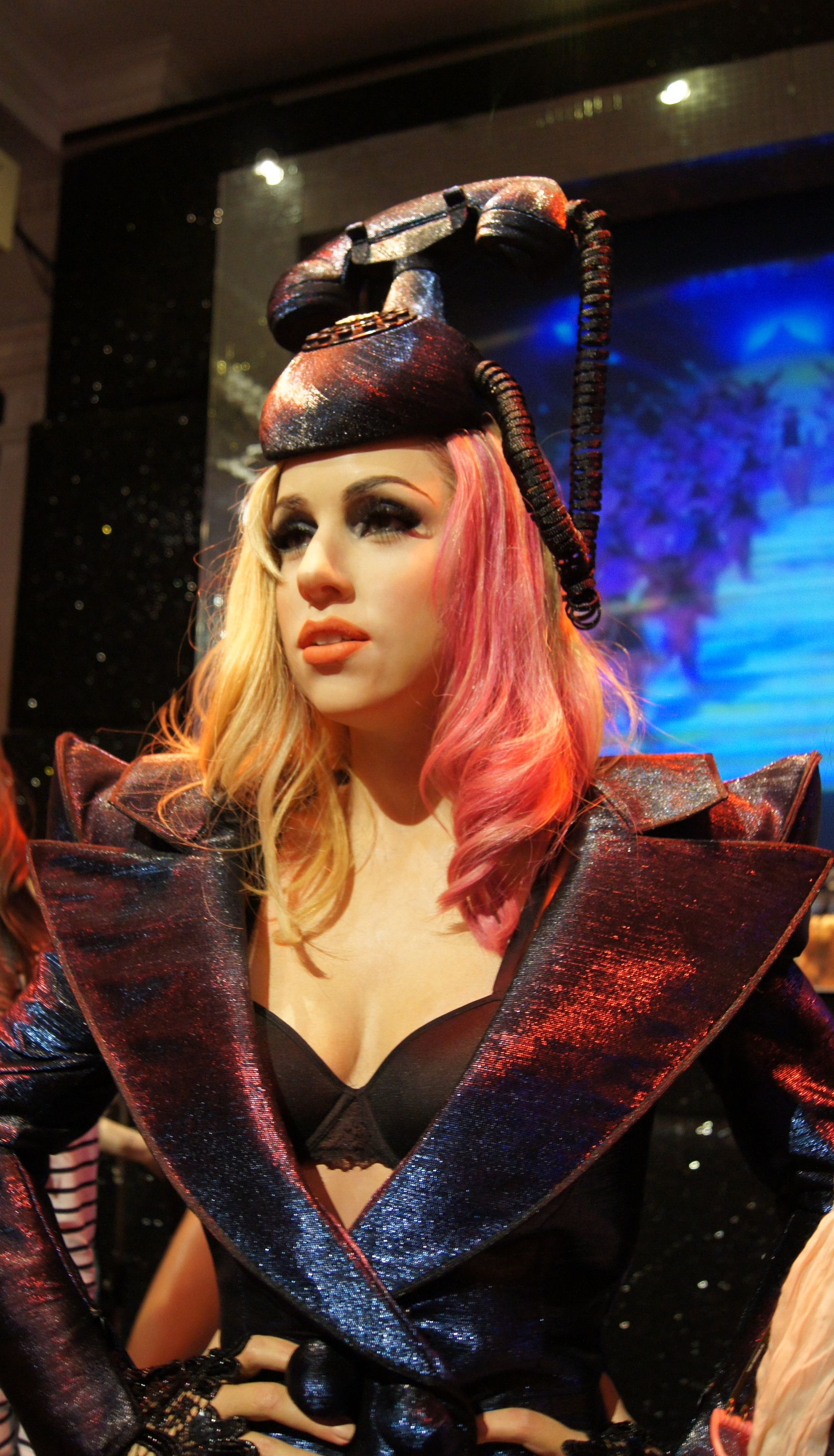
Lady Gaga

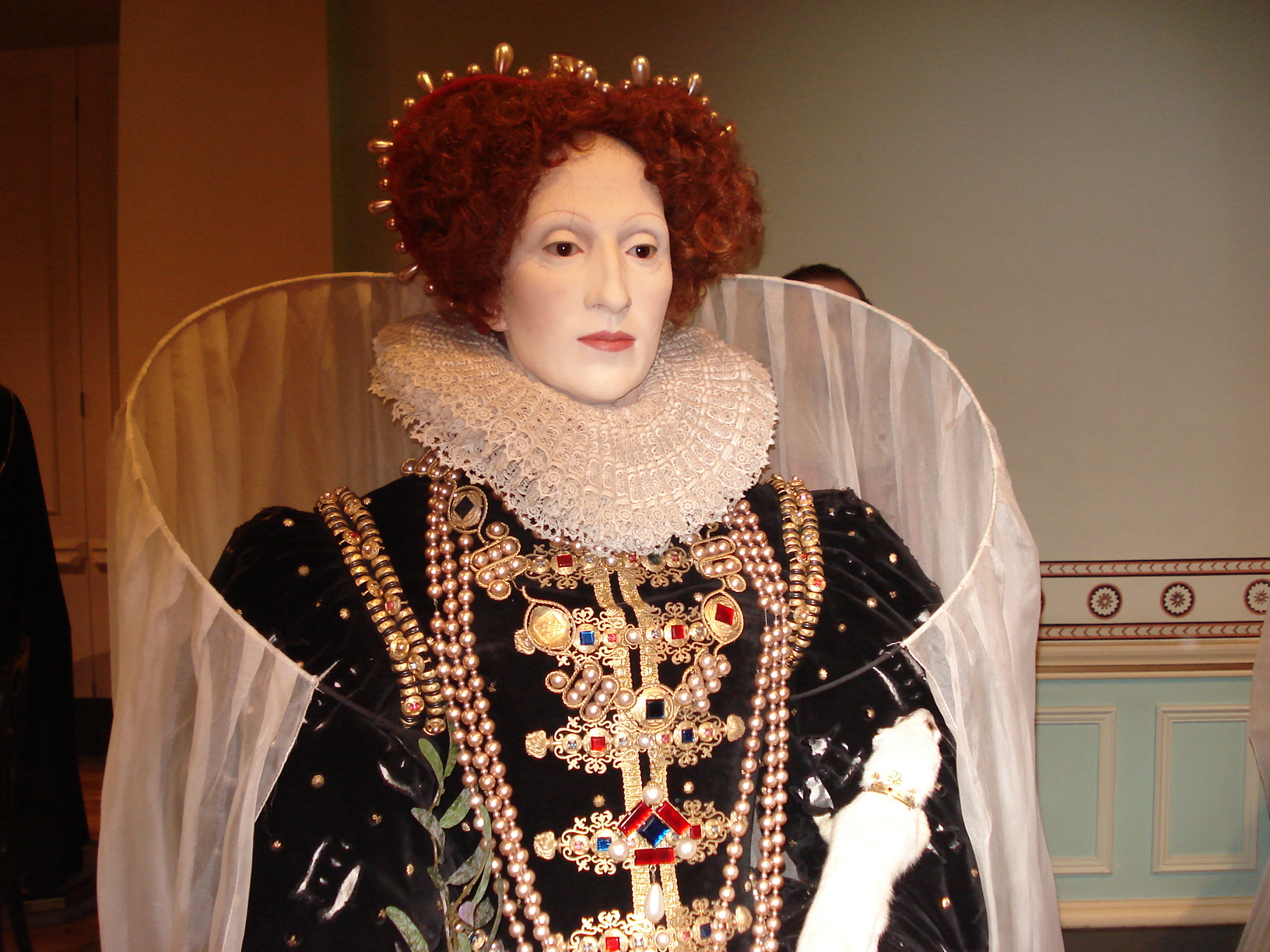
Elizabeth I

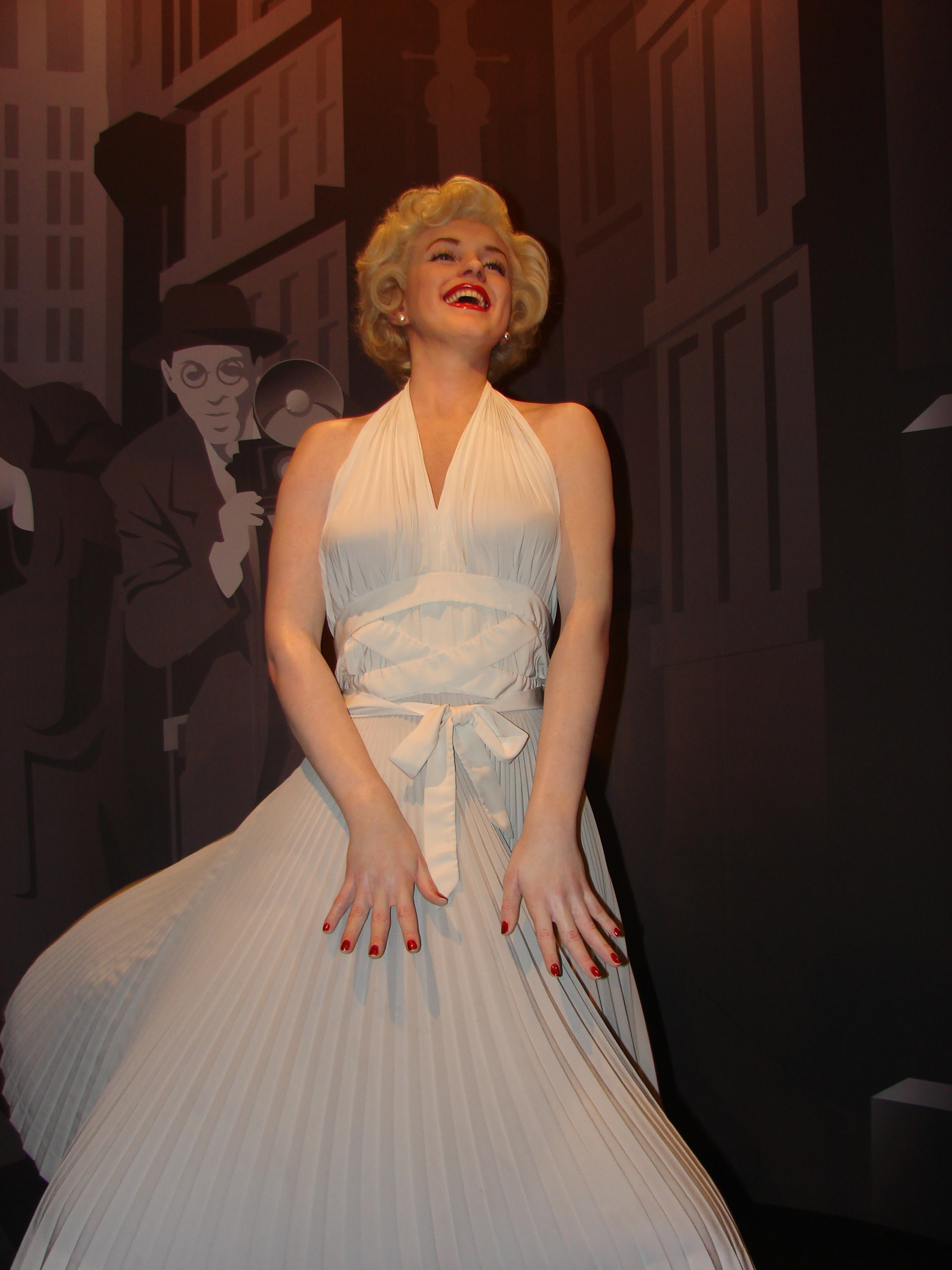
Marilyn Monroe

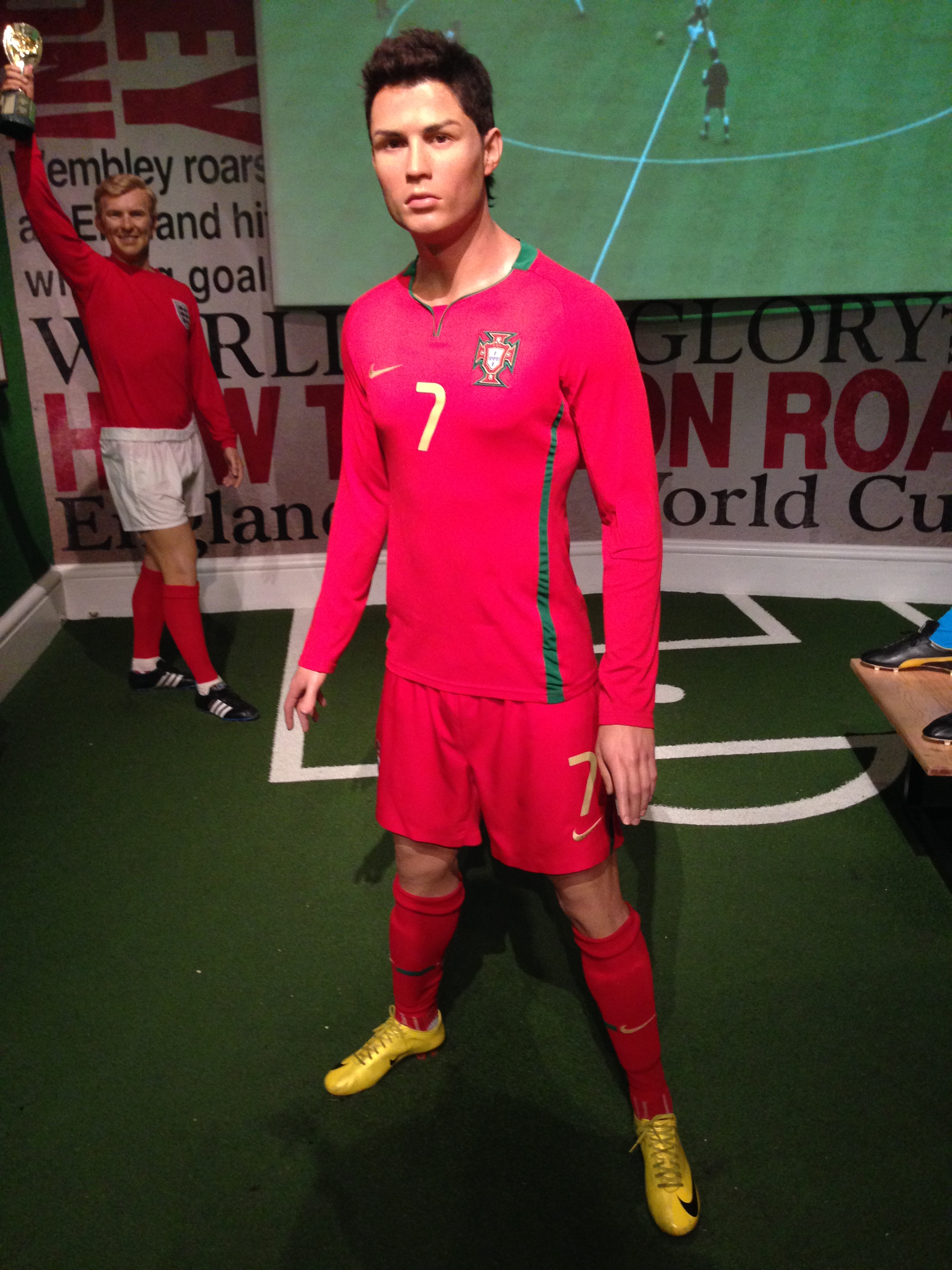
Cristiano Ronaldo

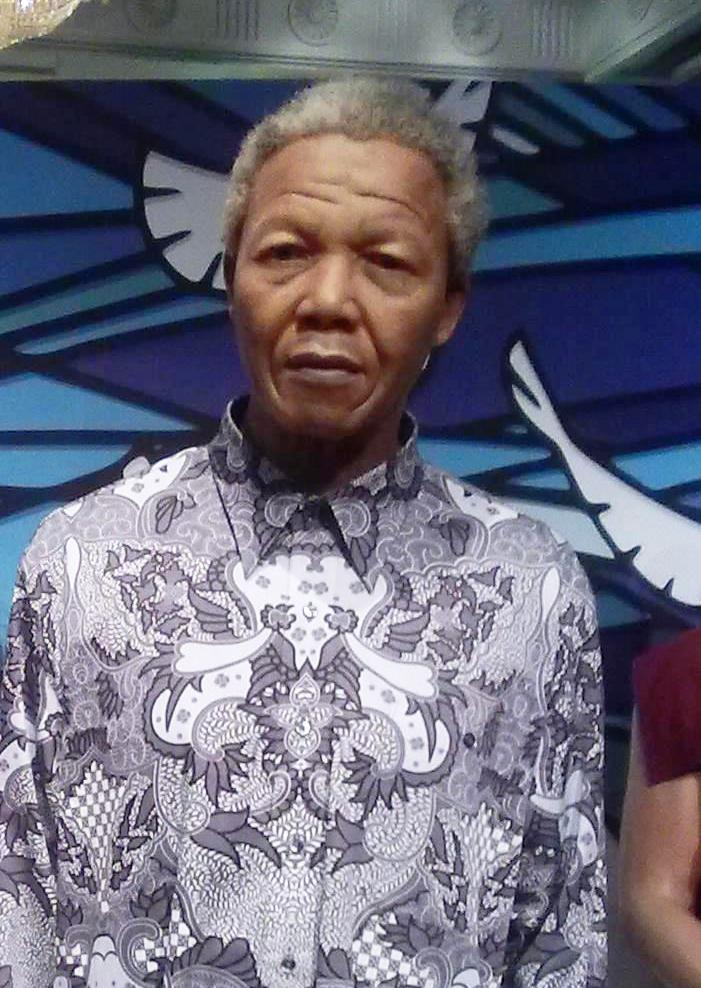
Nelson Mandela

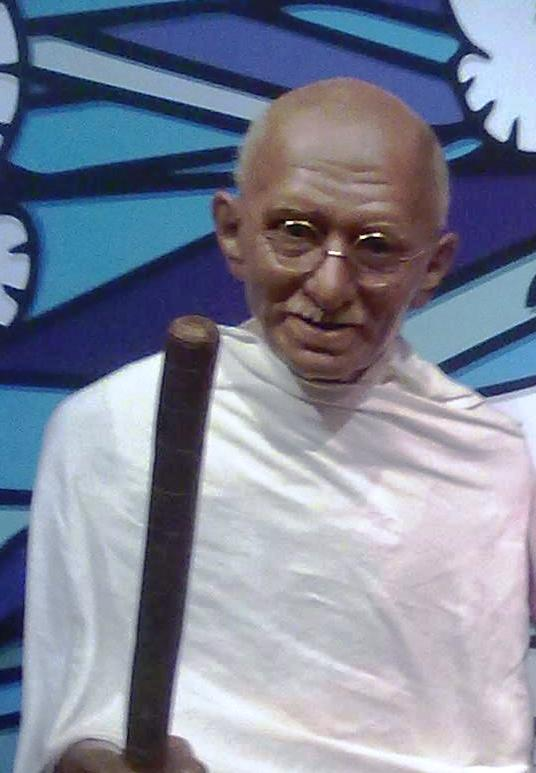
Mahatma Gandhi

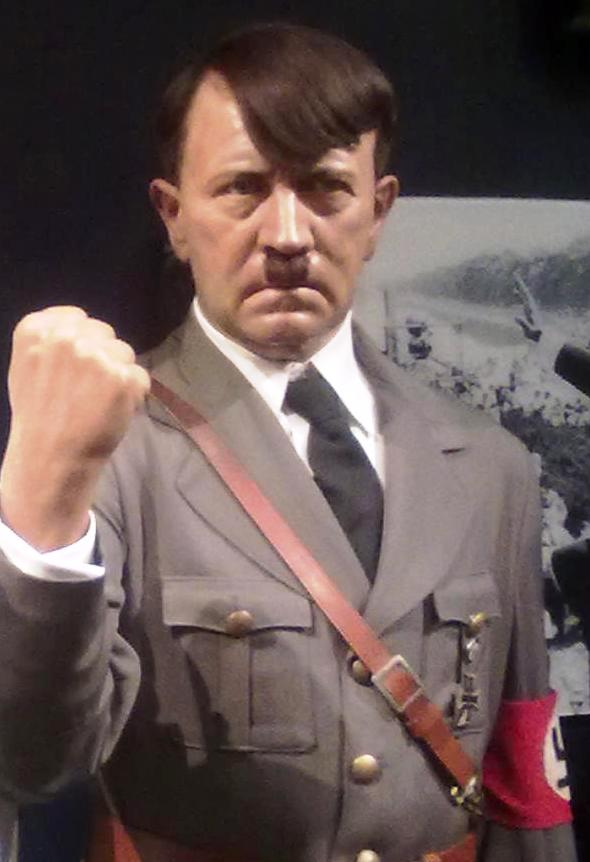
Adolf Hitler (formerly in the Chamber of Horrors section in London)

== See also ==
- Category:Madame Tussauds

== Bibliography ==
- Berridge, Kate (2006). Madame Tussaud: A life in wax. New York: HarperCollins. ISBN 978-0-06-052847-8.
- Chapman, Pauline (1984). Madame Tussaud's Chamber of Horrors: Two Hundred Years of Crime. London: Constable. ISBN 0-09-465620-7.
- Deakin, Johnston and Markesinis (2008). Markesinis & Deakin's Tort Law. Oxford University Press. ISBN 978-0-19-928246-3.
- Hervé, Francis, ed. (1838). Madame Tussaud's Memoirs and Reminiscences of France, forming an abridged history of the French Revolution. London: Saunders & Otley.
- McCallam, David (2002). "Waxing Revolutionary: Reflections on a Raid on a Waxworks at the Outbreak of the French Revolution". French History. 16 (2): 153–173. doi:10.1093/fh/16.2.153..
- Moran, Michelle (2011). Madame Tussaud: A Novel of the French Revolution. Crown. ISBN 978-0-307-58865-4.
- Pilbeam, Pamela (2006). Madame Tussaud: And the History of Waxworks. Continuum International Publishing Group. pp. 100–104. ISBN 1-85285-511-8.
