= Pilbeam =

Pilbeam is a surname. Notable people with the surname include:

- Peter Pilbeam, BBC producer who auditioned the Beatles and gave them their first five radio broadcasts before they had a recording contract.
- David Pilbeam, American academic and paleoanthropologist
- Harriette Pilbeam (known professionally as Hatchie), Australian singer-songwriter and musician
- Mike Pilbeam, English founder of Pilbeam Racing Designs
- Nova Pilbeam, British actress
- Pamela Pilbeam, English historian
- Rex Pilbeam, Australian politician
- Sally Pilbeam, Australian paratriathlete

== See also ==
- Pilbeam Racing Designs
