= Marie Tussaud =

French wax museum founder (1761–1850)

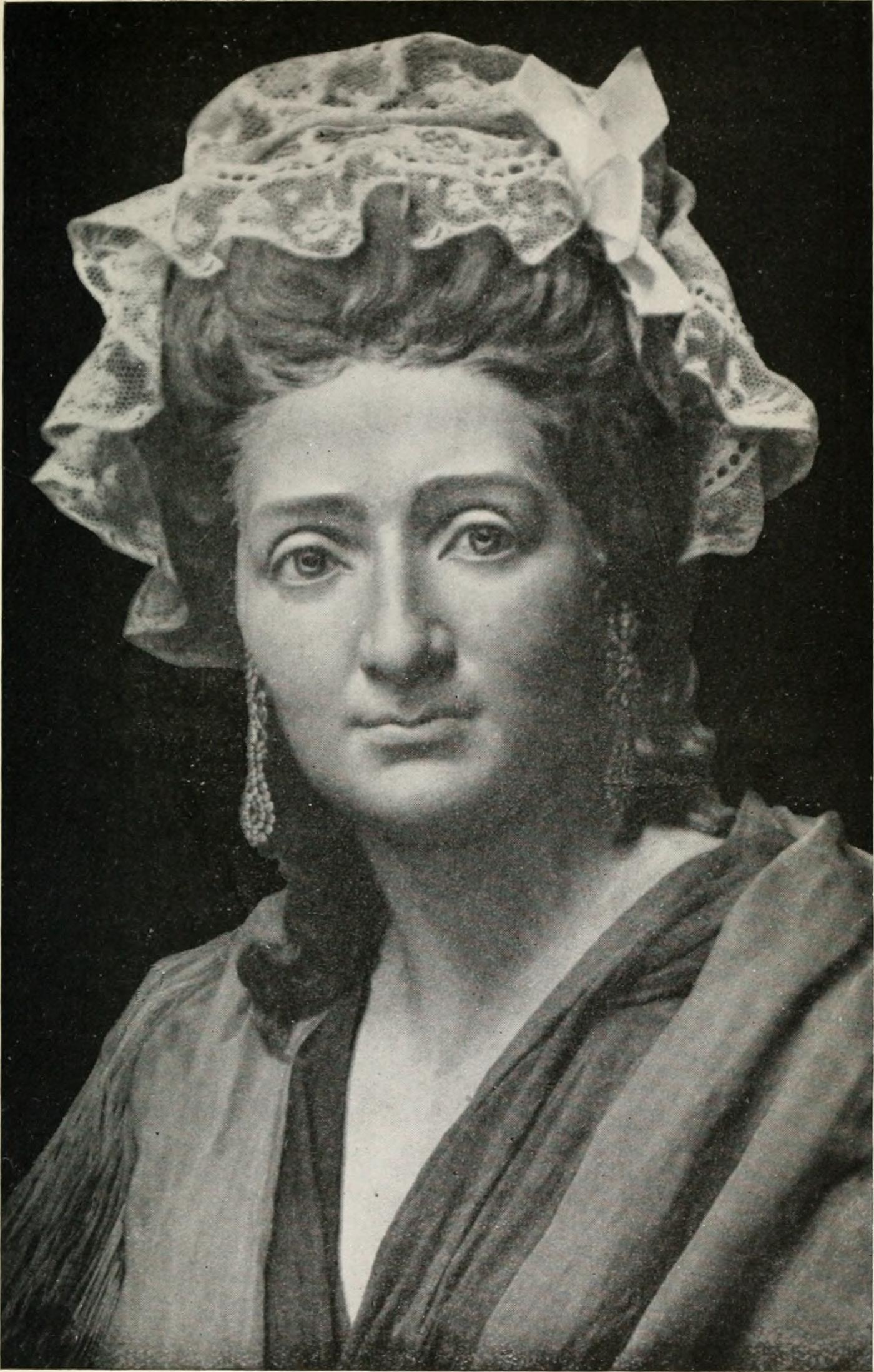
- Madame Tussaud "at the age of 42, when she left France for England". Portrait study by John Theodore Tussaud.
- Born: Anna Maria Grosholtz; 1 December 1761; Strasbourg, France
- Died: 16 April 1850 (aged 88); London, England
- Known for: Wax modelling
- Notable work: Madame Tussauds
- Spouse: François Tussaud (m. 1795)
- Children: 3 (one stillborn)

Anna Maria "Marie" Tussaud (French pronunciation: [maʁi tyso]; née Grosholtz; 1 December 1761 – 16 April 1850), commonly known as Madame Tussaud, was a French artist known for her wax sculptures and Madame Tussauds, the wax museum she founded in London.

== Biography ==
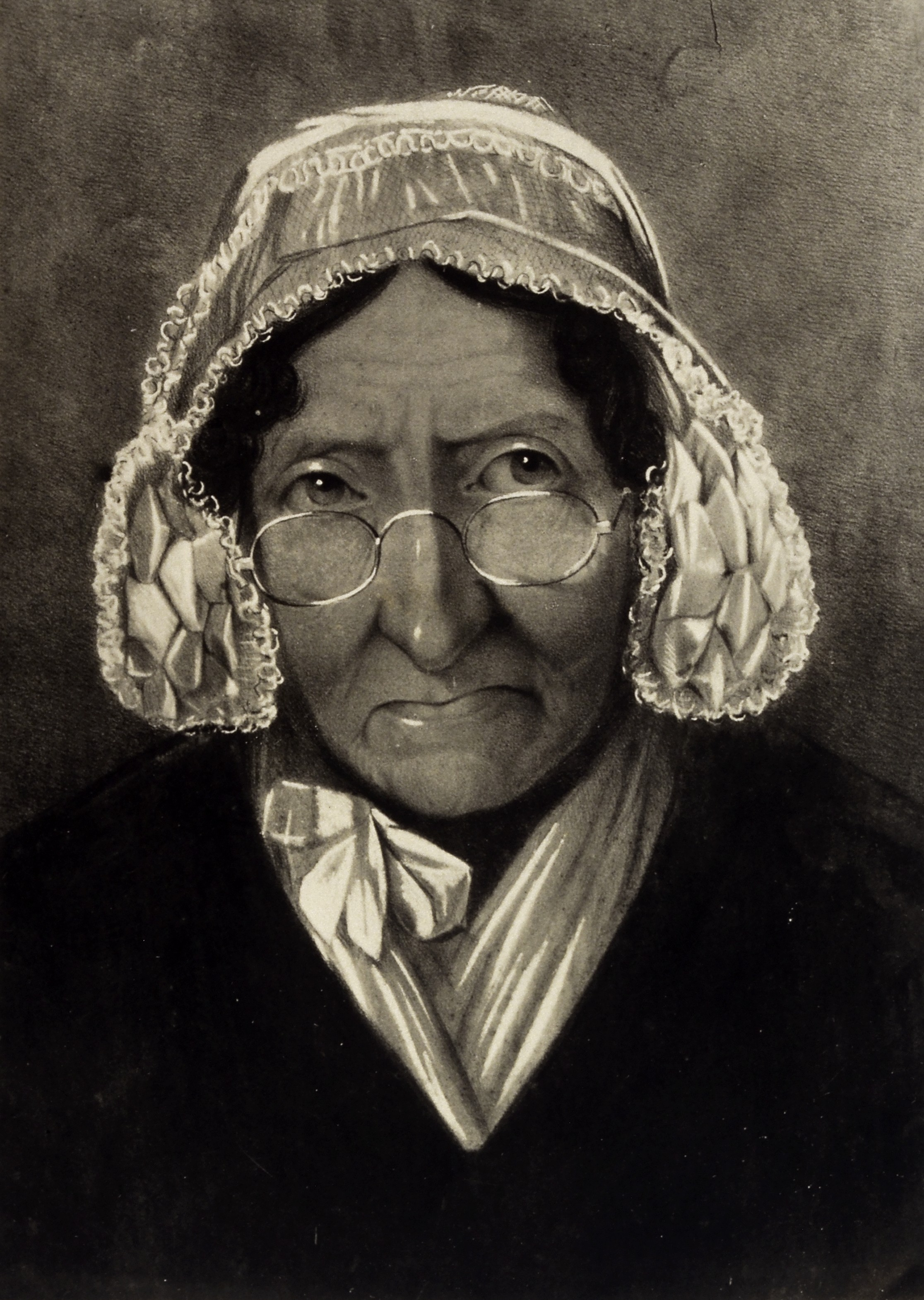
Photograph of Madame Tussaud, after a drawing attributed to Francis Tussaud

Marie Tussaud was born on 1 December 1761 in Strasbourg, France. Her father, Joseph Grosholtz, was killed in the Seven Years' War just two months before Marie was born. When she was six years old, her mother, Anne-Marie Walder, took her to Bern, Switzerland. There the family moved into the home of local doctor Philippe Curtius (1741–1794), for whom Anne-Marie acted as housekeeper.

Curtius, whom Marie would call her uncle, was skilled in wax modeling. He initially used this talent to illustrate anatomy, but he later used it for portraits. He moved to Paris in 1765 to establish a Cabinet de Portraits En Cire (Wax portraiture firm). In that year, he made a waxwork of Louis XV's last mistress, Madame du Barry, a casting that is the oldest waxwork currently on display. A year later, Tussaud and her mother joined Curtius in Paris. The first exhibition of Curtius' waxworks was shown in 1770 and attracted a large crowd. In 1776, the exhibition was moved to the Palais Royal and, in 1782, Curtius opened a second exhibit, the Caverne des Grands Voleurs (Cavern of the Grand Thieves), a precursor to Tussaud's Chamber of Horrors, on Boulevard du Temple.

=== Early career ===
Curtius taught Tussaud the art of wax modelling. She showed talent for the technique and began working for him as an artist. In 1777, she created her first wax figure, that of Voltaire. From 1780 until the Revolution in 1789, Tussaud created many of her most famous portraits of celebrities such as those of philosopher Jean-Jacques Rousseau, Benjamin Franklin and Voltaire. During this period her memoirs claim she became employed to teach votive making to Élisabeth, the sister of Louis XVI. In her memoirs, she admitted to be privy to private conversations between the princess and her brother and members of his court. She also claimed that members of the royal family were so pleased with her work that she was invited to live at Versailles for nine years, although no contemporary evidence exists to confirm her accounts.

=== French Revolution ===
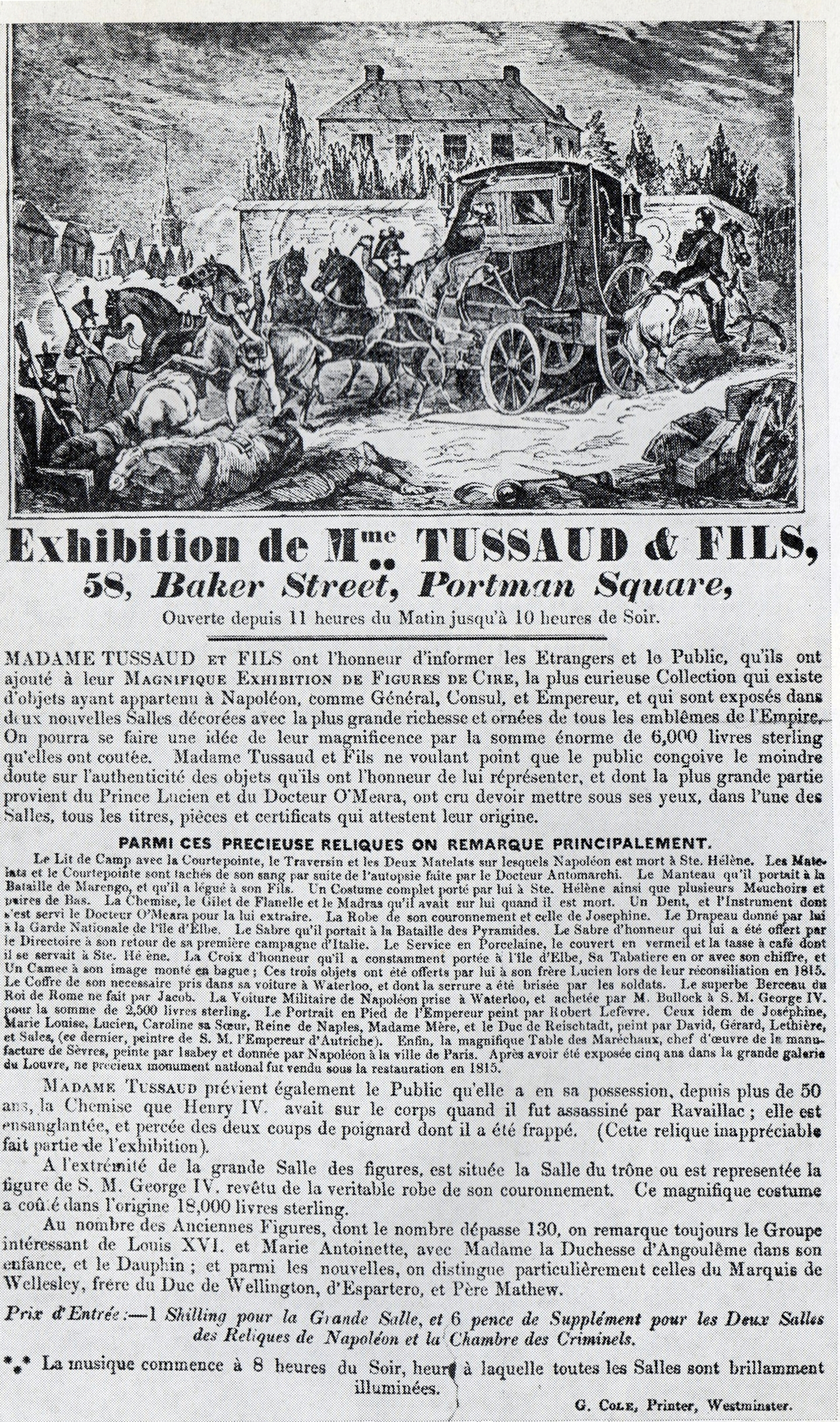
Poster for Tussaud wax figure exhibition in London, 1835

On 12 July 1789, wax heads of Jacques Necker and the duc d'Orléans made by Curtius were carried in a protest march two days before the attack on the Bastille.

Tussaud was perceived as a royal sympathiser; in the Reign of Terror she was arrested, along with Joséphine de Beauharnais, and her head was shaved in preparation for her execution by guillotine. She said she was released thanks to Collot d'Herbois' support for Curtius and his household. Tussaud said she then was employed to make death masks and whole body casts of the revolution's famous victims, including Louis XVI, Marie Antoinette, Princesse de Lamballe, Jean-Paul Marat, and Maximilien Robespierre.

When Curtius died in 1794, he left his collection of wax works to Tussaud. In 1795, she married François Tussaud, a civil engineer. The couple had three children: a daughter who died after birth and two sons, Joseph and François.

=== Great Britain ===
In 1802, after the Treaty of Amiens, Tussaud went to London with her son Joseph, then four years old, to present her collection of portraits. She had accepted an invitation from Paul Philidor, a magic lantern and phantasmagoria pioneer, to exhibit her work alongside his show at the Lyceum Theatre. She did not fare particularly well financially, and left for Edinburgh in 1803.

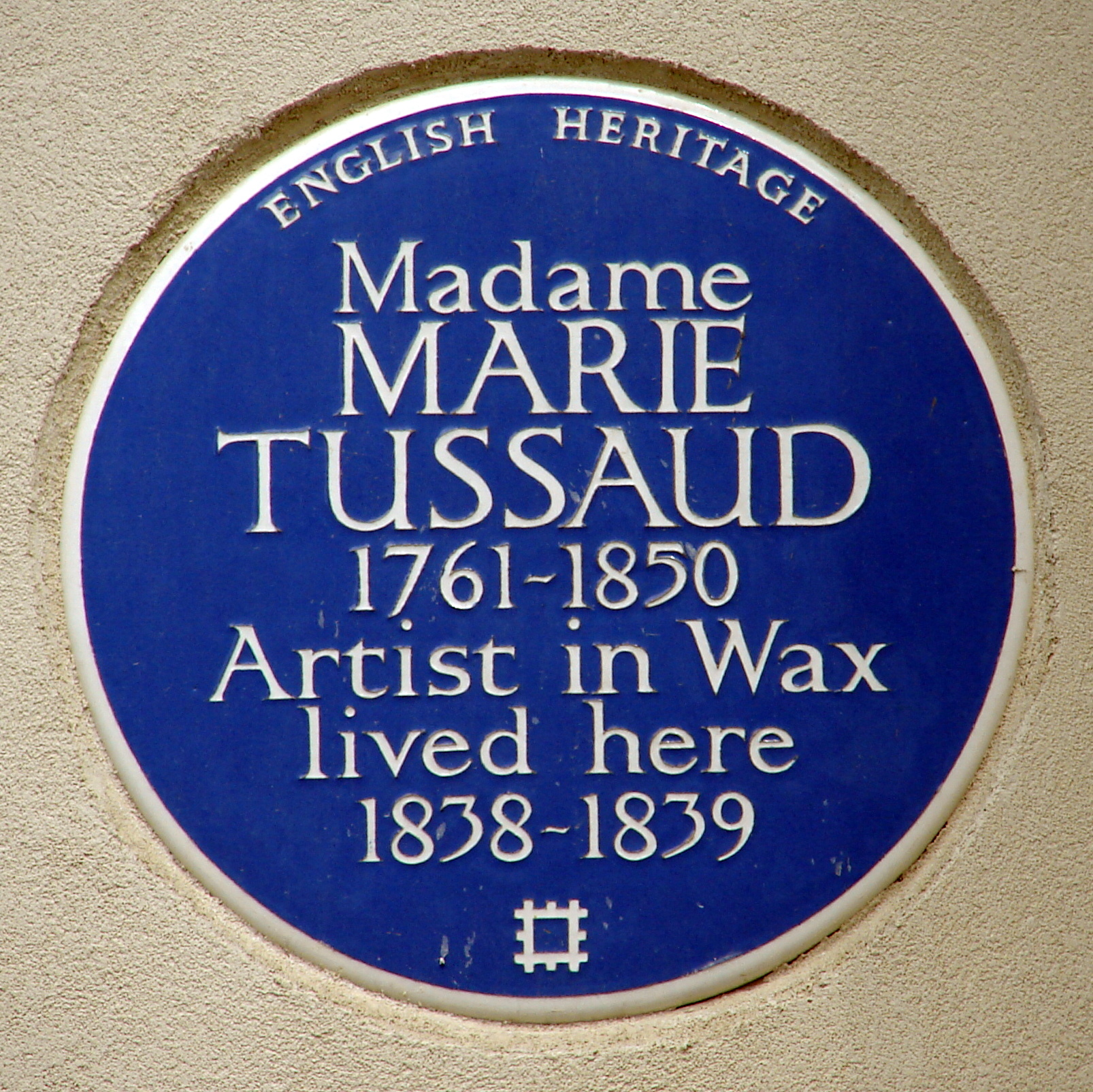
English Heritage blue plaque marking one of Tussaud's homes in the City of Westminster, London

As a result of the Napoleonic Wars, Tussaud was unable to return to France so she travelled with her collection throughout the British Isles. In 1822, she reunited with her son François, who joined her in the family business. Her husband remained in France and the two never saw each other again. In November 1825, her touring exhibition was in the Wisbech Georgian theatre (now the Angles Theatre), having already been at Yarmouth, Norwich, King's Lynn and Bury St Edmunds. Entrance was 1s. In 1835, after 33 years touring Britain, she established her first permanent exhibition in Baker Street, on the upper floor of the "Baker Street Bazaar". In 1838, she wrote her memoirs. In 1842, she made a self-portrait which is now on display at the entrance of her museum. Some of the sculptures done by Tussaud herself still exist.

She died in her sleep in London on 16 April 1850 at the age of 88. There is a memorial tablet to Madame Marie Tussaud on the right side of the nave of St. Mary's Roman Catholic Church, Cadogan Street, London.

== Legacy ==
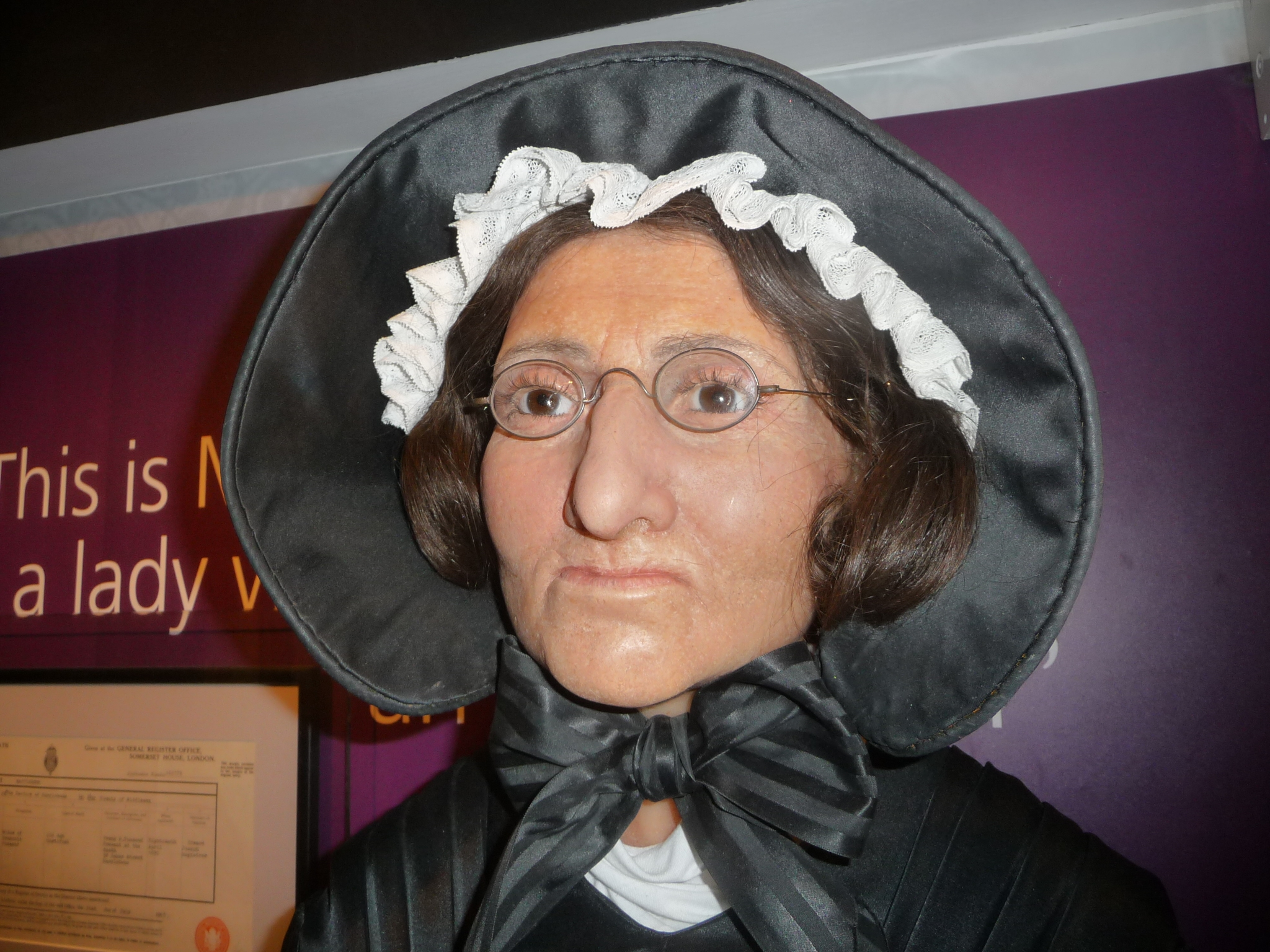
A wax sculpture of Marie Tussaud displayed at Madame Tussauds London

Upon Marie Tussaud's retirement, her son François (or Francis) became chief artist for the Exhibition. He was succeeded by his son Joseph, who was succeeded by his son John Theodore Tussaud.

Madame Tussaud's wax museum has now grown to become one of the major tourist attractions in London and has expanded with branches in Amsterdam, Istanbul, Beijing, Bangkok, Berlin, Blackpool, Sydney, Hong Kong, Wuhan, Las Vegas, San Francisco, Chongqing, Shanghai, New York City, Orlando, Nashville, Hollywood, Singapore, Tokyo, Budapest, Vienna, Washington D.C., New Delhi and Dubai. As of 2019, the newest museum is in Prague. The current owner is Merlin Entertainments, a company owned by Blackstone Group.

== In popular culture ==
Tussaud is a supporting character in the 1997 musical The Scarlet Pimpernel. The character was portrayed by Elizabeth Ward Land in the original Broadway cast and the 2000 US National Tour.

Tussaud was featured as a minor character and quest giver in the 2014 video game Assassin's Creed Unity, which takes place during the French Revolution. She's also the basis for the character Esmeralda Tusspells in The Great Ace Attorney 2: Resolve.

She is one of the main characters in the book Faces of the Dead by Suzanne Weyn. Edward Carey's 2018 novel Little is a novelization of her work and life.
