= Philippe Curtius =

Swiss physician and wax modeler

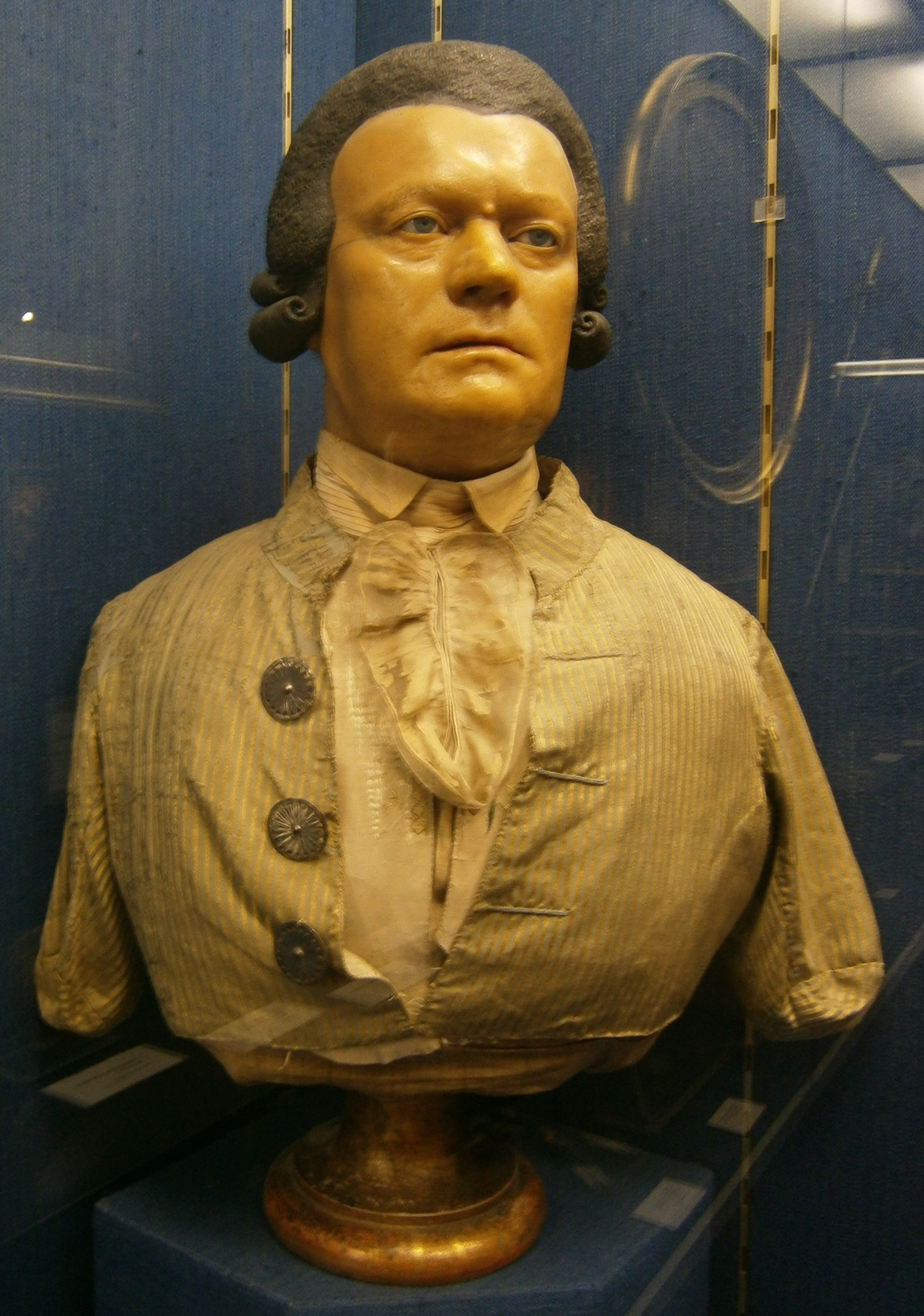
Philippe Curtius

Philippe Curtius (1737–1794) was a Swiss physician and wax modeler who taught Marie Tussaud the art of wax modelling.

Marie Grosholtz, the future Marie Tussaud, lived in the Bern home of Curtius, for whom her mother acted as housekeeper. Marie called him 'Uncle', and in many ways he was a father figure. Curtius used his skill in wax modelling to illustrate anatomy as a physician, and sometimes for the entertainment of visitors. Later, he started to do portraits. Curtius created beautiful anatomical wax models that were admired by the Prince de Conti.

In 1765, Curtius was persuaded to give up his medical career and move to Paris, where he could practice wax modelling as a fine art, starting work to set up a cabinet de cire (wax exhibition). In that year he made a waxwork of Jeanne Bécu, who would later become Marie Jean du Barry, Louis XV's mistress. A cast of that mould is his oldest work currently on display. His home in Paris was visited by many of the talented men of the day.

Marie and her mother moved to Paris to join Curtius. The first exhibition of Curtius' waxworks was shown in 1770, and attracted a lot of people. The exhibition moved to the Palais Royal in 1776. Curtius was admitted a member of the Academy of St-Luc in 1778. He opened a second location on Boulevard du Temple in 1782, the Caverne des Grands Voleurs, a precursor to the later Chamber of Horrors.

Curtius taught Marie the art of wax modelling. When he died in 1794, he left his collection of waxworks to her. In 1795, she married Francois Tussaud, and her later success in the waxworks business made the name "Tussaud" the most famous one in that form of art. She also became the matriarch of several generations of artists named Tussaud.
