= John Theodore Tussaud =

British artist (1858–1943)

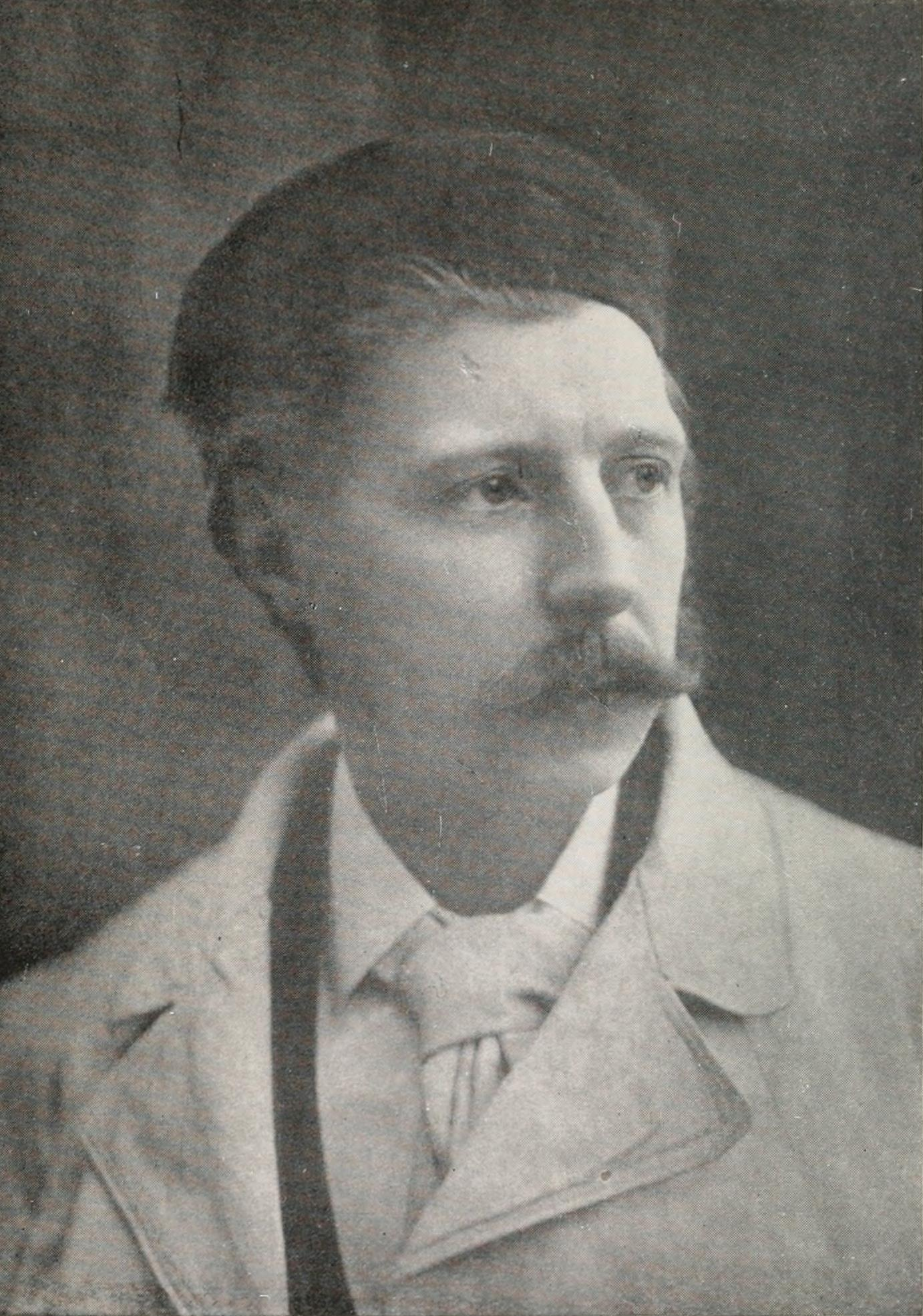
- Born: 2 May 1858; Kensington, United Kingdom of Great Britain and Ireland
- Died: 13 October 1943 (aged 85); Croxley Green, United Kingdom
- Known for: Wax modelling

John Theodore Tussaud (2 May 1858 – 13 October 1943) was a British sculptor, manager and chief artist of Madame Tussauds wax museum, as well as an author of several books.

John Theodore Tussaud was born in Kensington, England, the great-grandson of Marie Tussaud. Although his father sold Madame Tussauds to a company headed by Edwin Josiah Poyser in February 1889, John Theodore Tussaud continued in his role as manager and chief artist for many years.

He exhibited a bust of Alfred, Lord Tennyson and other sculptures at the Royal Academy. He wrote a book on the history of Madame Tussauds and the book The Chosen Four about four of Napoleon Bonaparte's loyal supporters who followed him into exile on Saint Helena. In 1935, Tussaud was elected a fellow of the Royal Society of Arts.
