= Pamela Pilbeam =

British historian (born 1941)

Pamela M. Pilbeam (born 1941) is an English historian, lecturer and professor emeritus at the Royal Holloway, University of London. She specializes in the history of France since 1789, especially in the 19th century.

Pilbeam has been a professor at the Royal Holloway, University of London since 1995, and became an emeritus professor in 2006. She was a president of the Society for the Study of French History.

== Works ==
- French Early Socialists 1790s-1870s (2025)
- The Revolting French c.1787-1889 (2024)
- Saint-Simonians in Nineteenth-Century France (2014)
- Madame Tussaud and the History of Waxworks (2003)
- French Socialists before Marx. Workers, Women and the Social Question in France (2000)
- The Constitutional Monarchy in France, 1814-48 (1999)
- Republicanism in nineteenth-Century France (1995)
- Themes in Modern European History, 1780-1830 (1995)
- The 1830 Revolution in France (1991)
- The Middle Classes in Europe, 1789-1914 (1990)
