= List of wax figures displayed at Madame Tussauds museums =

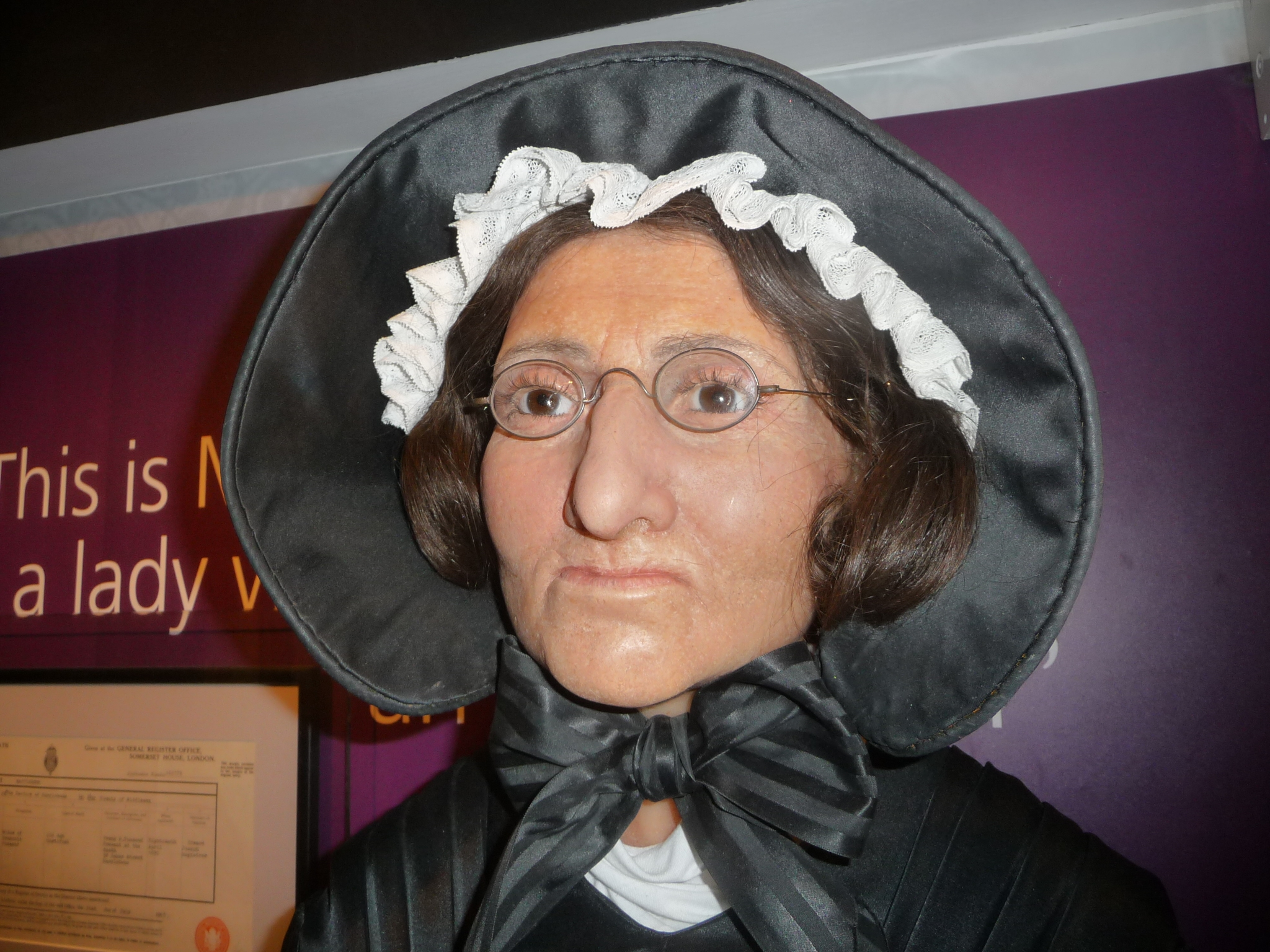
A waxwork of Madame Tussaud herself

The following is a list of wax figures which are currently displayed or have been displayed at one of the Madame Tussauds museums.

== List ==
=== A ===
- A. P. J. Abdul Kalam
- Aaliyah
- Abraham Lincoln
- Adele
- Adile Naşit
- Adolf Hitler
- Adriana Lima
- Ahmed Fahmy
- Ahmed Helmy
- Ahn Hyo-seop
- Afrojack
- Agnetha Fältskog
- Agnez Mo
- Aishwarya Rai Bachchan
- Al Roker
- Alan Carr
- Alan Jackson
- Alan Shearer
- Alan Titchmarsh
- Albert Einstein
- Alessandra Ambrosio
- Alexander Ovechkin
- Aleyna Tilki
- Alfie Deyes
- Alfred Hitchcock
- Alicia Keys
- Alien from Alien: Covenant
- Alison Hammond
- Allu Arjun as Bantu
- Alvin
- Amanda Holden
- Amanda Keller
- Amelia Earhart
- Amitabh Bachchan
- Amna Al Haddad
- Amy Winehouse
- Anderson Cooper
- André Hazes
- André Hazes jr.
- Andreas Gabalier
- Andrew Lloyd Webber
- Andrew Mountbatten-Windsor
- Anduin Lothar (Note: Portrayed by Travis Fimmel) (Warcraft character)
- Andy Cohen
- Andy Lau
- Andy Warhol
- Angela Bassett
- Angela Merkel
- Angelababy
- Angelina Jolie
- Anggun Cipta Sasmi
- Anil Kapoor
- Anita Mui
- Anitta
- Ann Thongprasom
- Anna Wintour
- Annabelle
- Anne Curtis
- Anne Frank
- Anne Hathaway
- Anni-Frid Lyngstad
- Annie Leibovitz
- Ant McPartlin
- Ant-Man (Note: Portrayed by Paul Rudd) (Marvel character)
- Anthony Joshua
- Antony Armstrong-Jones
- Anushka Sharma
- Aquaman (Note: Portrayed by Jason Momoa) (DC character)
- Arda Turan
- Ariana Grande
- Armin van Buuren
- Arnold Schwarzenegger
- Arnold Schwarzenegger as the Terminator
- Arthur Phillip
- Astro Boy (cartoon character)
- Asha Bhosle
- Atsuko Maeda
- Audrey Hepburn
- Aung San Suu Kyi
- Austin Mahone
- Avicii
- Awkwafina
- Ayrton Senna
- Ayşe Arman

=== B ===
- Babe Ruth
- Bae Yong-joon
- Bae Suzy
- Bad Bunny
- Banjo Paterson
- Balqees Ahmed Fathi
- Barbara Palvin
- Barbara Schöneberger
- Barbara Walters
- Barack Obama
- Barış Manço
- Batman (Note: Portrayed by Ben Affleck) (DC character)
- BB-8 (Star Wars character)
- Bear Grylls
- Beatrice Egli
- Beatrix of the Netherlands
- Becky
- Bela Lugosi
- Bella Ramsey
- Benazir Bhutto
- Benjamin Franklin
- Benedict Cumberbatch
- Benny Andersson
- Beren Saat
- Bert Newton
- Bet Lynch (Note: Portrayed by Julie Goodyear) (Coronation Street character)
- Bette Davis
- Betty White
- Beyoncé
- Bianca Heinicke (Note: Displayed as a hologram rather than a wax figure)
- Bill Clinton
- Bill Gates
- Bill Kaulitz
- Bill Nye
- Billy Porter
- Billie Holiday
- Billie Jean King
- Bin Baz
- Björn Ulvaeus
- Black Panther (Note: Portrayed by Chadwick Boseman) (Marvel character)
- Blue Man Group
- Bob Dylan
- Bob Hawke
- Bob Hope
- Bob Marley
- Bobby Moore
- Boris Johnson
- Boris Karloff
- Brad Pitt
- Bradley Cooper
- Brandon Routh
- Britney Spears
- Brian Cox
- Brian Lara
- Bruce Forsyth
- Bruce Lee
- Bruce Springsteen
- Bruce Willis
- Bruno Mars
- Buddhadasa Bhikkhu
- Buzz Aldrin

=== C ===
- C-3PO (Star Wars character)
- Çağatay Ulusoy as Harun
- Cai Xukun
- Calvin Harris
- Cameron Diaz
- Queen Camilla
- Capital Bra
- Captain America (Note: Portrayed by Chris Evans) (Marvel character)
- Captain Marvel (Note: Portrayed by Brie Larson) (Marvel character)
- Cara Delevingne
- Carina Lau
- Carl Perkins
- Carrie Fisher as Princess Leia (Star Wars character)
- Carrie Underwood
- Carmelo Anthony
- Carla DiBello
- Cate Blanchett
- Catherine, Princess of Wales
- Catharina-Amalia, Princess of Orange
- Cathy Freeman
- Catriona Gray
- Cecilia Cheung
- Celine Dion
- Channing Tatum
- Chantal Janzen
- King Charles III
- Charles Esten
- Charles Dickens
- Charles Kingsford Smith
- Charlie Chaplin
- Charlize Theron
- Chen Kun
- Chester A. Arthur
- Cheryl
- Chewbacca (Star Wars character)
- Changmin
- Chris Hemsworth
- Chris Pratt
- Christian Bale
- Christina Aguilera
- Chuck Liddell
- Clark Gable
- Claudia Winkleman
- Clint Eastwood
- Coco Lee
- Cody Simpson
- Conchita Wurst
- Colin Firth
- Colin Powell
- Conan O'Brien
- Conor McGregor
- Connie Britton as Rayna Jaymes
- Connie Chan
- Courtney Act
- Craig Revel Horwood
- Criss Angel
- Cristiano Ronaldo
- Cro
- Crocodile Dundee (Note: Portrayed by Paul Hogan)
- Cui Jian
- Curtis Stone
- Cyborg (Note: Portrayed by Ray Fisher) (DC character)

=== D ===
- Dalai Lama
- Dale Earnhardt
- Dale Earnhardt Jr.
- Dame Edna Everage
- Dan Marino
- Danelle Morgan
- Daniel Craig as James Bond
- Daniel Radcliffe
- Dannii Minogue
- Danny Trejo
- DanTDM
- Darius Rucker
- Darth Maul (Star Wars character)
- Darth Vader (Star Wars character)
- David Alaba
- David Attenborough
- David Beckham
- David Bowie
- David Cameron
- David Hasselhoff
- David Wright
- David Jason
- Davina McCall
- Davina Michelle
- Dawn Fraser
- Declan Donnelly
- Deepika Padukone
- Deirdre Barlow (Note: Portrayed by Anne Kirkbride) (Coronation Street character)
- Delta Goodrem
- Demet Akbağ
- Demi Lovato
- Dennis Nilsen
- Denzel Washington
- Derek Jeter
- Desmond Tutu
- Diana, Princess of Wales
- Diana Ross
- Diljit Dosanjh
- Dirk Nowitzki
- Doctor Strange (Note: Portrayed by Benedict Cumberbatch) (Marvel character)
- Don Bradman
- Don King
- Donald Trump
- Doner kebab
- Donnie Yen
- Dominic Thiem
- Dominik Szoboszlai
- Dorothy Parker
- Drake
- Drew Barrymore
- Dua Lipa
- Durotan (Note: Portrayed by Toby Kebbell) (Warcraft character)
- Dylan Alcott
- Dwayne Johnson

=== E ===
- E.T.
- Ed Sheeran
- Eddie Mabo
- Eddie Murphy
- Eddie Redmayne
- Edward III
- Edward Enninful
- Edward Scissorhands (Note: Portrayed by Johnny Depp)
- Edwin Lee
- Edis
- Elettra Lamborghini
- Eli Manning
- Elie Saab
- Ella Fitzgerald
- Elle Macpherson
- Queen Elizabeth I
- Queen Elizabeth II
- Elizabeth Taylor
- Elon Musk
- Elton John
- Elvis Presley
- Elyas M'Barek
- Enzo Knol
- Emma Bunton
- Emma Watson
- Emmeline Pankhurst
- Eric Bana
- Eric Church
- Erich Honecker
- Ernest Hemingway
- Eusébio
- Eva Longoria
- Eva Mendes
- Evander Holyfield

=== F ===
- F. Scott Fitzgerald
- Falco
- Faith Hill
- Fan Bingbing
- Fandi Ahmad
- Felix Lobrecht
- Femke Broeders-Bol
- Fei Xiang
- Ferenc Puskás
- Fergie
- Fidel Castro
- Princess Fiona
- The Flash (Note: Portrayed by Ezra Miller) (DC character)
- Flemming
- Florence Griffith Joyner
- Frank Bruno
- Frank Sinatra
- Franklin D. Roosevelt
- Franklin Pierce
- Franz Beckenbauer
- Franz Liszt
- Fred Hollows
- Freddie Mercury
- Freddy Heineken
- Frederick Douglass
- Freek Vonk
- Frida Kahlo
- Friedensreich Hundertwasser
- Fuat Güner
- Fuyunyan (Yo-kai Watch character)

=== G ===
- Gao Xiaosong
- Garona Halforcen (Note: Portrayed by Paula Patton) (Warcraft character)
- Gary Barlow
- G Flip
- G.E.M.
- King George III
- George Clooney
- George Harrison
- George H. W. Bush
- George Jones
- George Lazenby as James Bond
- George Lopez
- George Steinbrenner
- George Strait
- George W. Bush
- George Washington
- Gerard Joling
- Gérard Depardieu
- Gerhard Berger
- Gillian Anderson
- The Gingerbread Man (Shrek character)
- Glenn Close
- Glenn McGrath
- Goh Chok Tong
- Gok Wan
- Golda Meir
- Gong Jun
- Gordon Ramsay
- Gottfried Helnwein
- Graham Kennedy
- Greg Inglis
- Greg Norman
- Greggs sausage roll
- Groot (Marvel character)
- Grover Cleveland
- Grumpy Cat
- Guan Xiaotong
- Guo Jingjing
- Gurmit Singh as Phua Chu Kang
- Gustav Klimt
- Guus Meeuwis
- Guy Fawkes
- Guy-Manuel de Homem-Christo
- Guy Pearce as Felicia Jollygoodfellow
- Gwen Stefani

=== H ===
- Halle Berry
- Han Geng
- Hank Williams
- Hannibal Lecter (Note: Portrayed by Anthony Hopkins)
- Hans Sigl
- Hansi Hinterseer
- Harry Houdini
- Hardwell
- Harry Styles
- Harrison Ford as Han Solo (Star Wars character)
- Harriet Tubman
- Prince Harry
- Harry Kane
- Harry S. Truman
- Harvey Milk
- Hassan El Shafei
- Hawkeye (Note: Portrayed by Jeremy Renner) (Marvel character)
- Hawley Harvey Crippen
- Hayden Christensen as Anakin Skywalker
- Heath
- Heath Ledger
- Hedo Türkoğlu
- Heidi Klum
- Helen Keller
- Helen Mirren
- Helene Fischer
- Hello Kitty
- Henry VIII
- Henry Ford
- Henry Lawson
- Henry Parkes
- Herbert Hoover
- Herbert Prohaska
- Herman Brood
- Hermann Maier
- Heydar Aliyev
- Hidebat (Yo-kai Watch character)
- Hilda Ogden (Note: Portrayed by Jean Alexander) (Coronation Street character)
- Hillary Clinton
- Horst Schlämmer
- Hou Minghao
- Howard Hughes
- Hrithik Roshan
- Hu Ge
- Hu Jintao
- Hu Yitian
- Hua Chenyu
- Huang Bo
- Huang Lei
- Huang Wenyong
- Huang Xiaoming
- Huda Kattan
- Hugh Bonneville
- Hugh Grant
- Hugh Hefner
- Hulkbuster (Marvel character)
- Humberto Tan
- Humphrey Bogart
- Hyun Bin

=== I ===
- Ian Smith as Harold Bishop
- Ian Thorpe
- Idris Elba
- The Incredible Hulk (Marvel character)
- Indira Gandhi
- The Invisible Woman (Note: Portrayed by Jessica Alba) (Marvel character)
- Iron Man (Marvel character)
- Isaac Newton
- István Széchenyi
- Ivanka Trump

=== J ===
- J Balvin
- J. Edgar Hoover
- Jabba the Hutt (Star Wars character)
- Jack Duckworth (Note: Portrayed by Bill Tarmey) (Coronation Street character)
- Jack Harlow
- Jack Neo
- Jack Nicholson
- Jack P. Shepherd (Note: Portrayed by David Platt) (Coronation Street character)
- Jack the Ripper
- Jackie Chan
- Jacob Elordi
- Jackson Wang
- Jackson Yee
- Jacques Chirac
- Jacqueline Kennedy Onassis
- Jade Thirlwall
- Jake Sully (Note: Portrayed by Sam Worthington) (Avatar character)
- Jam Hsiao
- Jamal Musiala
- Jamie Foxx
- Jamie Oliver
- James Brown
- James Cook
- James Dean
- Jane Horrocks
- Jane Lynch
- Jane Lynch as Sue Sylvester
- Janis Joplin
- Jason Aldean
- Jason Derulo
- Jawaharlal Nehru
- Jay Chou
- Jean Paul Gaultier
- Jean-Paul Marat
- Jeff Goldblum
- Jeff Gordon
- Jenna Marbles
- Jennifer Aniston
- Jennifer Hudson
- Jennifer Lawrence
- Jennifer Lopez
- Jeremy Lin
- Jerry Garcia
- Jerry Lee Lewis
- Jerry Springer
- Jesse Owens
- Jessica Ennis-Hill
- Jessica Simpson
- Jesy Nelson
- Jet Li
- Jiang Xin as Shen Jilan
- Jiang Zemin
- Jibanyan (Yo-kai Watch character)
- Jim Carrey
- Jim Parsons
- Jimmy Barnes
- Jimmy Carter
- Jimmy Dickens
- Jimmy Fallon
- Jimmy Kimmel
- Jimmy Zámbó
- Jimi Hendrix
- JJ Lin
- Joan Rivers
- Joanna Lumley
- Joachim Gauck
- Jodie Whittaker as the Doctor
- Joe Biden
- Joe DiMaggio
- Joe Hart
- Joe Montana
- Joe Jonas
- Johan Cruijff
- John Adams
- John Bishop
- John Boyega
- John Christie
- John F. Kennedy
- John Farnham
- John Haigh
- John Howard
- John Quincy Adams
- John Travolta
- Johnny Cash
- Johnny Depp
- John Lennon
- John von Neumann
- John Wayne
- Joker Xue
- Joko Widodo
- Jon Hamm
- Jonah Lomu
- Jonny Wilkinson
- Joop van den Ende
- Josephine Baker
- Joshua Kimmich
- José Mourinho
- Juan Ponce de León
- Judy Garland as Dorothy Gale
- Julia Gillard
- Julia Roberts
- Juliana of the Netherlands
- Juliette Gordon Low
- Jung Hae-in
- Junichiro Koizumi
- Jutta Leerdam
- Justin Bieber
- Justin Timberlake

=== K ===
- Kacey Musgraves
- Kadim Al Sahir
- Kai Pflaume
- Kajal Aggarwal
- Kajol
- Kamala Harris
- Kandice Pelletier
- Kanye West
- Kapil Dev
- Karan Johar
- Kareem Abdul-Jabbar
- Kareena Kapoor Khan
- Karl Marx
- Karol G
- Karry Wang
- Katalin Karády
- Kate McKinnon as Jillian Holtzmann
- Kate Moss
- Kate Winslet
- Katniss Everdeen (Note: Portrayed by Jennifer Lawrence) (The Hunger Games character)
- Katie Couric
- Katinka Hosszú
- Katy Perry
- Kathy Griffin
- Kathryn Bernardo
- Katrina Kaif
- Kazuyoshi Miura
- Keita (Yo-kai Watch character)
- Keith Lemon
- Keith Urban
- Ken Barlow (Note: Portrayed by William Roache) (Coronation Street character)
- Ken Dodd
- Kendall Jenner
- Kerem Bürsin
- Kevin Jonas
- Kenny Rogers
- Kevin Keegan
- Khemanit Jamikorn
- Kid Rock
- Kim Hyun-joong
- Kim Kardashian
- Kim Petras
- Kim Soo-hyun
- Kim Woo-bin
- King Kong
- Kıvanç Tatlıtuğ
- Kobe Bryant
- Kontra K
- Kourtney Kardashian
- Kris Fade
- Kris Jenner
- Kris Wu
- Kristen Wiig as Erin Gilbert
- KSI
- Kwa Geok Choo
- Kylian Mbappé
- Kylie Minogue
- Kylie Jenner

=== L ===
- Lance Armstrong
- Lando Norris
- Lady Gaga
- Lajos Kossuth
- Lamine Yamal
- Larry King
- László Papp
- Laverne Cox
- Lay Zhang
- Layne Beachley
- Lea Salonga
- Lee Chong Wei
- Lee Hsien Loong
- Lee Jong-suk
- Lee Kuan Yew
- Lee Min-ho
- Lee Jun-ho
- Lei Jiayin
- Leigh-Anne Pinnock
- Lenny Kravitz
- Leon Lai Yi
- Leona Lewis
- Leonard Bernstein
- Leonardo da Vinci
- Leonardo DiCaprio
- Leslie Cheung
- Leslie Jones as Patty Tolan
- Lewis Capaldi
- Lewis Hamilton
- Li Bingbing
- Li Na
- Li Ronghao
- Li Xiaopeng
- Liam Hemsworth
- Liam Neeson as Qui-Gon Jinn
- Liam Payne
- Lil Nas X
- Lil Kleine
- Lin Dan
- Lin-Manuel Miranda
- Lionel Messi
- Lin Gengxin as Xing Zhi / Xing Yun
- Liu Wen
- Liu Xiang
- Liv Lisa Fries as Charlotte Ritter
- Liz Smith
- Liza Minnelli
- Lizzo
- Lleyton Hewitt
- Loki (Marvel character)
- Lorde
- Loretta Lynn
- Louis XVI
- Louis Armstrong
- Louis Koo
- Louis Tomlinson
- Louis Walsh
- Lu Han
- Luciano Pavarotti
- Lucille Ball
- Ludwig van Beethoven
- Luke Bryan
- Luke Littler
- Luke Skywalker (Note: Portrayed by Mark Hamill) (Star Wars character)
- Luo Tianyi (Vocaloid)
- Lyndon B. Johnson

=== M ===
- Ma Yili
- Madame Mak (cartoon character)
- Madhubala as Anarkali
- Madhuri Dixit
- Madonna
- Mahesh Babu
- Mahathir Mohamad
- Mahatma Gandhi
- Majid Al Mohandis
- Makarios III
- Malcolm X
- Maluma
- Manny (Ice Age character)
- Manny Pacquiao
- Manuel Neuer
- Mao Asada
- Mao Zedong
- Marco Borsato
- Maria Sharapova
- Marlene Dietrich
- Marlon Brando
- Mariah Carey
- Marie Antoinette
- Marie Tussaud
- Marilyn Monroe
- Mario Maurer
- Mark Chao
- Mark Webber
- Mark Zuckerberg
- Martin Garrix
- Martin Luther King Jr.
- Marvin Gaye
- Mary Earps
- Mary Kom
- Mary MacKillop
- Masaki Suda
- Master Chief (Halo character)
- Matt Lauer
- Matt Lucas as Andy Pipkin
- Matthew McConaughey
- Matthias Corvinus
- Matthias Schweighofer
- Matsuko Deluxe
- Maya Angelou
- Maya Diab
- Maximilien de Robespierre
- Queen Máxima of the Netherlands
- Mayu Watanabe
- Mazhar Alanson
- McDull
- Megan Gale
- Megan Thee Stallion
- Meghan, Duchess of Sussex
- Mehmed II
- Mel B
- Mel Gibson as Mad Max
- Melania Trump
- Melanie C
- Melissa McCarthy as Abby Yates
- Melissa Naschenweng
- Meret Becker as Esther Kasabian
- Mesut Özil
- McDull (cartoon character)
- Michael Bublé
- Michael Hutchence
- Michael Jackson
- Michael Jordan
- Michael Phelps
- Michael Strahan
- Michelle Connor (Note: Portrayed by Kym Marsh) (Coronation Street character)
- Michelle Kwan
- Michelle Obama
- Michelle Yeoh
- Mickey Mantle
- Michiel Huisman
- Mihály Munkácsy
- Mike Tyson
- Mikhail Gorbachev
- Miley Cyrus
- Milkha Singh
- Millie Bobby Brown as Enola Holmes
- Mimar Sinan
- Minnie Pearl
- Miranda Kerr
- Miriam Yeung
- Missy Elliott
- Mitsu Dan
- Mo Farah
- Mohamed Salah
- Mohammed Assaf
- Mona Kattan
- Mona Lisa
- Morecambe and Wise
- Morgan Freeman
- Motu (cartoon character)
- Muhammad Ali
- Murat Boz
- Mustafa Kemal Atatürk
- Müslüm Gürses

=== N ===
- Nancy Ajram
- Nancy Reagan
- Naomi Campbell
- Niall Horan
- Napoleon Bonaparte
- Narendra Modi
- Nathan Lane
- Nathan "Nate" Adams (Yo-kai Watch character)
- Neil Armstrong
- Ncuti Gatwa as the Doctor
- Necati (cartoon character)
- Neil Patrick Harris
- Nelson Mandela
- Neşet Ertaş
- Neville Heath
- Neytiri (Note: Portrayed by Zoe Saldaña) (Avatar character)
- Neymar
- Ned Kelly
- Nick Fury (Note: Portrayed by Samuel L. Jackson) (Marvel character)
- Nick Jonas
- Nichkhun
- Nicki Minaj
- Nicky Wu as Yongzheng Emperor
- Nicholas Tse
- Nicola Adams
- Nicolas Cage
- Nicolas Sarkozy
- Nicole Kidman
- Nikkie de Jager
- Nina Hagen
- The Notorious B.I.G.

=== O ===
- Obi-Wan Kenobi (Note: Portrayed by Ewan McGregor) (Star Wars character)
- Olaf Scholz
- Olga Korbut
- Olivia Newton-John
- Olly Alexander
- Olly Murs
- Oprah Winfrey
- Orlando Bloom as Will Turner
- Oscar Wilde
- Otto von Bismarck
- Otto Waalkes
- Özkan Uğur
- Ozzy Osbourne

=== P ===
- Pablo Picasso
- Paddy McGuinness
- Paddington Bear
- Palpatine (Note: Portrayed by Ian McDiarmid) (Star Wars character)
- Paris Hilton
- Park Hae-jin
- Pata
- Patlu (cartoon character)
- Patrick Stewart
- Patrick Swayze
- Patsy Cline
- Paul Hogan
- Paul McCartney
- Paul Newman
- Pelé
- Penélope Cruz
- Peng Liyuan
- Pennywise
- Perrie Edwards
- Peter Alexander
- Peter Andre
- Peter Dinklage
- Peyton Manning
- Pharrell Williams
- Phil Taylor
- Pia Wurtzbach
- Pierce Brosnan as James Bond
- Piet Mondrian
- Pink
- Pitbull
- Po (cartoon character)
- Pope Benedict XVI
- Pope Francis
- Pope John Paul II
- Post Malone
- Prabhas
- Prince Philip
- Prince
- Priyanka Chopra

=== Q ===
- Quentin Crisp
- Quentin Tarantino

=== R ===
- R2-D2 (Star Wars character)
- Rachael Ray
- Rafael Nadal
- Rafiki (Broadway Icons)
- Raj Kapoor
- Rajiv Gandhi
- Ram Charan
- Ramdev
- Ranbir Kapoor
- Randy Travis
- Ranveer Singh
- Ray Meagher as Alf Stewart
- Reba McEntire
- Rebel Wilson
- Regan MacNeil
- Reginald "Reggie" Kray
- Rembrandt
- Rey (Star Wars character)
- Ricky Martin
- Richard I
- Richard Branson
- Richard Gere
- Richard Lugner
- Richard Nixon
- Rico Verhoeven
- Rihanna
- Ringo Starr
- Robert Baden-Powell
- Robert Irwin
- Robert Downey Jr.
- Robert Downey Jr. as Sherlock Holmes
- Robert Mugabe
- Robert Pattinson
- Robert Redford
- Robbie Williams
- Robin Williams
- Rod Laver
- Rocket Raccoon (Marvel character)
- Roger Moore as James Bond
- Rola
- Roland Kaiser
- Rolf Harris
- Romeo Santos
- Ronald "Ronnie" Kray
- Ronald Reagan
- Ronaldinho
- Ronaldo
- Rosa Parks
- Ross Lynch
- Rove McManus
- Roy Wang
- RuPaul
- Rumi
- Russell Brand
- Rutherford B. Hayes
- Ruth Ellis
- Ryan Gosling
- Ryan Reynolds
- Ma Yili

=== S ===
- Sabiha Gökçen
- Sachin Tendulkar
- Saddam Hussein
- Sadiq Khan
- Sakamoto Ryōma
- Şakir (cartoon character)
- Sally Pearson
- Salma Hayek
- Salman Khan
- Salvador Dalí
- Samuel L. Jackson
- Sam Smith
- Sándor Petőfi
- Sandra Bullock
- Santa Claus
- Sarah, Duchess of York
- Sarah Michelle Gellar
- Sathyaraj
- Scarlett Johansson
- Scrat (Ice Age character)
- Sean Combs
- Sean Connery as James Bond
- Sebastian Vettel
- Selena Gomez
- Selena Quintanilla
- Seni Pramoj
- Serena Williams
- Sergiu Toma
- Shah Rukh Khan
- Shahid Kapoor
- Shakira
- Shane Warne
- Shang Wenjie
- Shaquille O'Neal
- Sharon Osbourne
- Shawn Mendes
- Shirley (cartoon character)
- Shrek
- Shreya Ghoshal
- Shuri (Note: Portrayed by Letitia Wright) (Marvel character)
- Sid (Ice Age character)
- Sigmund Freud
- Silence Wang
- Silpa Bhirasri
- Simon
- Simon Cowell
- Simu Liu
- Sitting Bull
- Siwon Choi
- Sleeping Beauty
- Slim Dusty
- Slimer (Note: Appears as part of a VR experience rather than a wax figure)
- Sofía Vergara
- Smosh
- Snelle
- Snoop Dogg
- Sonja Zietlow
- Sonu Nigam
- Sooty
- Spider-Man (Marvel character)
- SpongeBob SquarePants
- Sridevi
- Stan Lee
- Stefanie Sun
- Stephen I of Hungary
- Stephen Colbert
- Stephen Curry
- Stephen Hawking
- Steve Aoki
- Steve Irwin
- Steve Jobs
- Stevie Wonder
- Steven Gerrard
- Steven Spielberg
- Stormzy
- Su Yiming
- Sugizo
- Suleiman the Magnificent
- Stormtrooper (Star Wars character)
- Sukarno
- Sun Yang
- Sun Yingsha
- Sunny Leone
- Superman (Note: Portrayed by Henry Cavill) (DC character)
- Susan Boyle
- Susan Sarandon
- Sven Kramer
- Sweep

=== T ===
- Tammy Wynette
- Tansu Çiller
- Tarık Akan
- Taro Hakase
- Taylor Lautner
- Taylor Swift
- Teresa Teng
- Teddy Teclebrhan
- Tess Daly
- Theeradej Wongpuapan
- Thor (Note: Portrayed by Chris Hemsworth) (Marvel character)
- Thomas Bangalter
- Thomas Edison
- Thomas Jefferson
- Theodore
- Theodore Roosevelt
- Theresa May
- The Nun
- Tiësto
- Tiffany Haddish
- Tiffany Tang
- Tiger Woods
- Tim Cahill
- Tim McGraw
- Timothée Chalamet
- Timothy Dalton as James Bond
- Tinker Bell
- Tolga Çevik
- Tom Baker as the Doctor
- Tom Cruise
- Tom Daley
- Tom Hanks
- Tom Hiddleston as James Conrad
- Tom Hardy
- Tommy Cooper
- Tong Liya
- Toni Collette
- Tony Bennett
- Tony Blair
- Tony Hawk
- Tony Jaa
- Toshi
- Travis Barker
- Trisha Yearwood
- Troye Sivan
- Truganini
- Tuba Büyüküstün
- Tupac Shakur
- Tyra Banks

=== U ===
- Udo Jürgens
- Uma Thurman
- Uncle Sam
- Usain Bolt
- Usher
- Uwe Seeler

=== V ===
- Varun Dhawan
- Vera Duckworth (Note: Portrayed by Liz Dawn) (Coronation Street character)
- Victor Chang
- Queen Victoria
- Victoria Beckham
- Vin Diesel
- Vincent van Gogh
- Vinícius Júnior
- Viola Davis
- Virat Kohli
- Virgil Van Dijk
- Vladimir Putin
- Volker Bruch as Gereon Rath

=== W ===
- Walt Disney
- Wanchana Sawasdee as King Naresuan the Great
- Waylon Jennings
- Wayne Brady
- Wayne Gretzky
- Wayne Newton
- Wayne Rooney
- Wendy Williams
- Whisper (Yo-kai Watch character)
- Whitney Houston
- Whoopi Goldberg
- Wilhelmina of the Netherlands
- Will.i.am
- Prince William
- William Chan
- William Henry Harrison
- William Howard Taft
- William McKinley
- William Shakespeare
- William the Silent
- Will Smith
- King Willem-Alexander
- Wincent Weiss
- Winnie Harlow
- Winston Churchill
- Wolfgang Amadeus Mozart
- Logan / Wolverine (Note: Portrayed by Hugh Jackman) (Marvel character)
- Wonder Woman (Note: Portrayed by Gal Gadot) (DC character)
- Wong Ka Kui
- Woody Allen
- Woodrow Wilson
- Wowkie Zhang
- Wu Lei

=== X ===
- Xi Jinping
- Xin Zhilei

=== Y ===
- Yang Lan
- Yang Yang
- Yang Zi
- Yao Ming
- Yasemin Dalkılıç
- Yasser Al-Qahtani
- Yasser Arafat
- Yaşar Kemal
- Yayoi Kusama
- Yim Si-wan
- Yip Pin Xiu
- Yoda (Star Wars character)
- Yoshiki
- Yuki Ishikawa
- Yuko Oshima
- Yunho
- Yusof Ishak
- Yuzuru Hanyu

=== Z ===
- Z.Tao
- Zac Efron
- Zach Galifianakis as Alan Garner
- Zachary Taylor
- Zakir Hussain
- Zayn Malik
- Zendaya
- Zeki Müren
- Zhang Jike
- Zheng Kai
- Zhang Ruoyun
- Zhang Songwen
- Zhang Yishan
- Zhang Zhehan
- Zhao Liying
- Zhao Liying as Shen Li
- Zhou Dongyu
- Zhou Shen
- Zhu Yilong
- Zoe Saldaña
- Zoe Sugg
- Zoe Tay
- Zoe Wees

== See also ==
- Madame Tussauds Amsterdam
- Madame Tussauds Beijing
- Madame Tussauds Blackpool
- Madame Tussauds Delhi
- Madame Tussauds Dubai
- Madame Tussauds Hollywood
- Madame Tussauds Hong Kong
- Madame Tussauds Istanbul
- Madame Tussauds Las Vegas
- Madame Tussauds New York
- Madame Tussauds San Francisco
- Madame Tussauds Shanghai
- Madame Tussauds Singapore
- Madame Tussauds Sydney
- Madame Tussauds Vienna
- Madame Tussauds Washington D.C.
