= Madame Tussauds Istanbul =

Wax museum in Istanbul

İstiklal Avenue
- Status: Closed
- Opening date: November 9, 2016
- Closing date: December 2024

Ride statistics
- Attraction type: Wax Museum

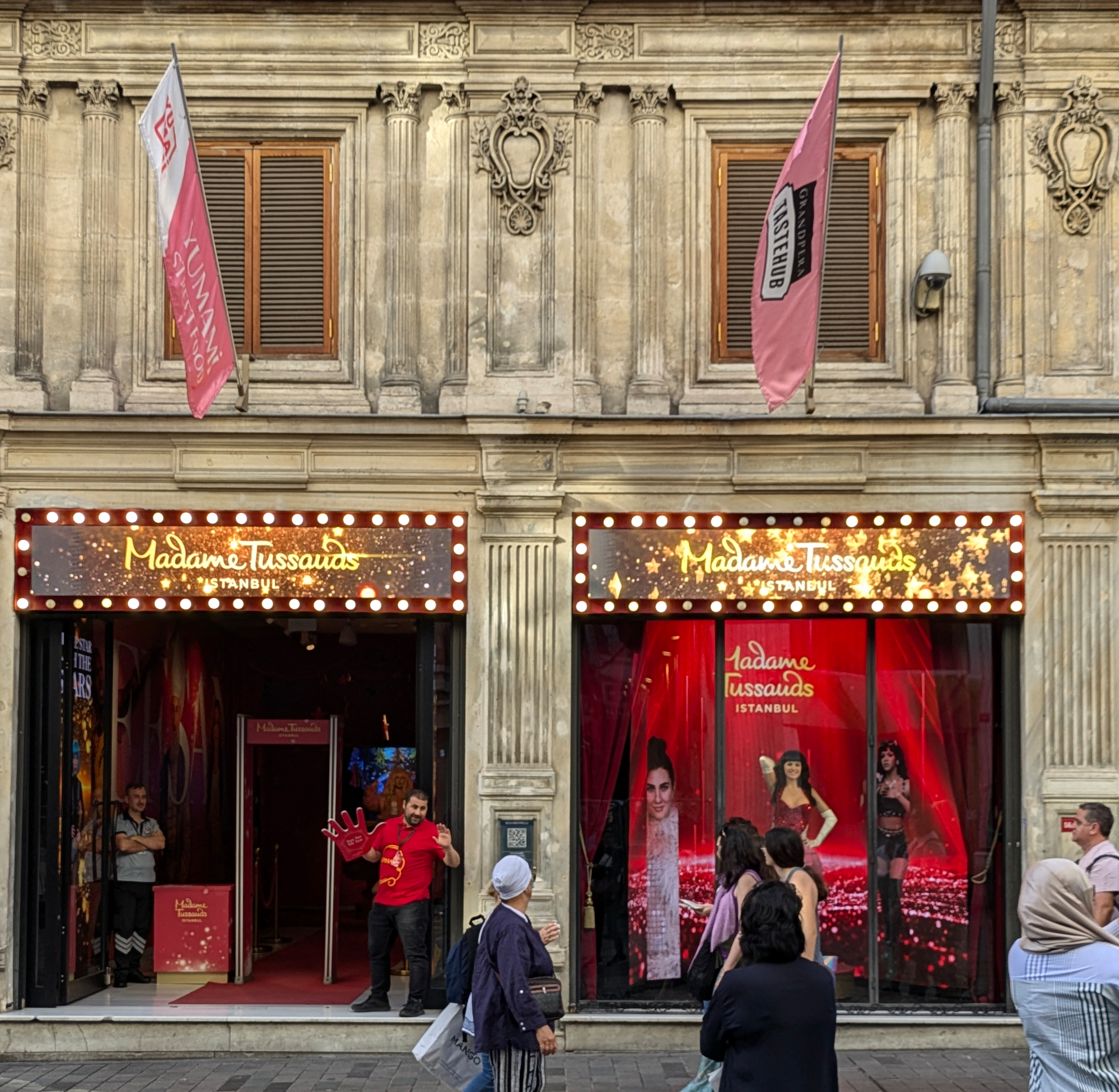
Museum entrance on İstiklal Street

Madame Tussauds Istanbul was a wax museum and tourist attraction located on İstiklal Avenue in Istanbul. It was the twenty first location for the Tussauds, which was set up by sculptor Marie Tussaud. Madame Tussauds was owned and operated by Merlin Entertainments. It was opened in November 2016 and closed in December 2024.

== Wax figures ==
=== History and leaders ===
Figure	Year Added	Ref.
Mustafa Kemal Atatürk	2016	
Mehmed II	2016	
Suleiman the Magnificent	2016	
Rumi	2016	
Mimar Sinan	2016	
Tansu Çiller	2019	

=== Science and culture ===
Figure	Year Added	Ref.
Yaşar Kemal	2016	
Leonardo da Vinci	2016	
Wolfgang Amadeus Mozart	2016	
Steve Jobs	2016	
Albert Einstein	2016	
Sabiha Gökçen	2016	
Marie Tussaud	2016	

=== Cinema ===
Figure	Year Added	Ref.
Marilyn Monroe	2016	
Audrey Hepburn	2016	
Jennifer Lawrence	2016	
Steven Spielberg	2016	
Tom Cruise	2016	
Tarık Akan	2018	
Spider-Man	2019	
Harun	2020	
Vin Diesel	2016	
Bruce Willis	2016	
Shrek	2016	
Adile Naşit	2016	
E.T.	2016	
Anduin Lothar	2016	
Arnold Schwarzenegger	2023	
Bruce Lee	2024	

=== Sports ===
Figure	Year Added	Ref.
Muhammad Ali	2016	
Lionel Messi	2016	
Hedo Türkoğlu	2016	
Rafael Nadal	2016	
Maria Sharapova	2016	
Usain Bolt	2016	
Arda Turan	2016	
Cristiano Ronaldo	2018	
Neymar	2016	
Yasemin Dalkılıç	2016	
Mesut Özil	2021	
Tiger Woods	2024	

=== Music ===
Figure	Year Added	Ref.
Michael Jackson	2016	
Madonna	2016	
Beyoncé	2016	
Lady Gaga	2016	
Bob Marley	2016	
Zeki Müren	2016	
Müslüm Gürses	2018	
Murat Boz	2018	
Aleyna Tilki	2020	
Justin Bieber	2016	
MFÖ	2016	
Edis	2021	
Barış Manço	2016	
Neşet Ertaş	2017	
Rihanna	2016	
Katy Perry	2022/2023	
Dua Lipa	2024	

=== VIP Party ===
Figure	Year Added	Ref.
Angelina Jolie	2016	
Brad Pitt	2016	
Johnny Depp	2016	
Julia Roberts	2016	
Leonardo DiCaprio	2016	
Beren Saat	2016	
Kıvanç Tatlıtuğ	2016	
Tolga Çevik	2017	
Kerem Bürsin	2016	
Demet Akbağ	2016	
David Beckham	2016	
Victoria Beckham	2016	
Ayşe Arman	2021	
Tuba Büyüküstün	2023	
Shah Rukh Khan	2023	
Ryan Gosling	2024	

=== Upcoming ===
Figure	Year Added	Ref.
Harry Styles	TBA	
Elon Musk	TBA	
Taylor Swift	TBA	
Arda Güler	TBA	
Necati	TBA	
Şakir	TBA	

=== Removed ===
Figure	Year Added	Year Removed	Ref.
Mona Lisa	2017	2017	
Kim Kardashian	2020	2020	
Kanye West	2020	2020	
Will Smith	2021	2022	
Maya Diab	2018	2020	
Bin Baz	2018	2020	
Nancy Ajram	2018	2020	
Elie Saab	2018	2020	
Carla DiBello	2018	2020	
Kendall Jenner	2023	2023	
Jackie Chan	2019	2023	
Demi Lovato	2018	2024	
Jennifer Aniston	2024	2024	

== See also ==
- Chamber of Horrors (Madame Tussauds), London
- Marie Tussaud
- Madame Tussauds Delhi
- Madame Tussauds Hollywood
- Madame Tussauds Hong Kong
- Madame Tussauds Las Vegas
- Madame Tussauds New York
- Madame Tussauds Rock Circus (1989–2001, London)
- Madame Tussauds San Francisco
- Madame Tussauds Shanghai
- Madame Tussauds Singapore
- Madame Tussauds Sydney
- Madame Tussauds Washington D.C.
- Merlin Entertainments
