= Madame Tussauds San Francisco =

Californian wax museum

Coordinates: 37.808186°N 122.414810°W

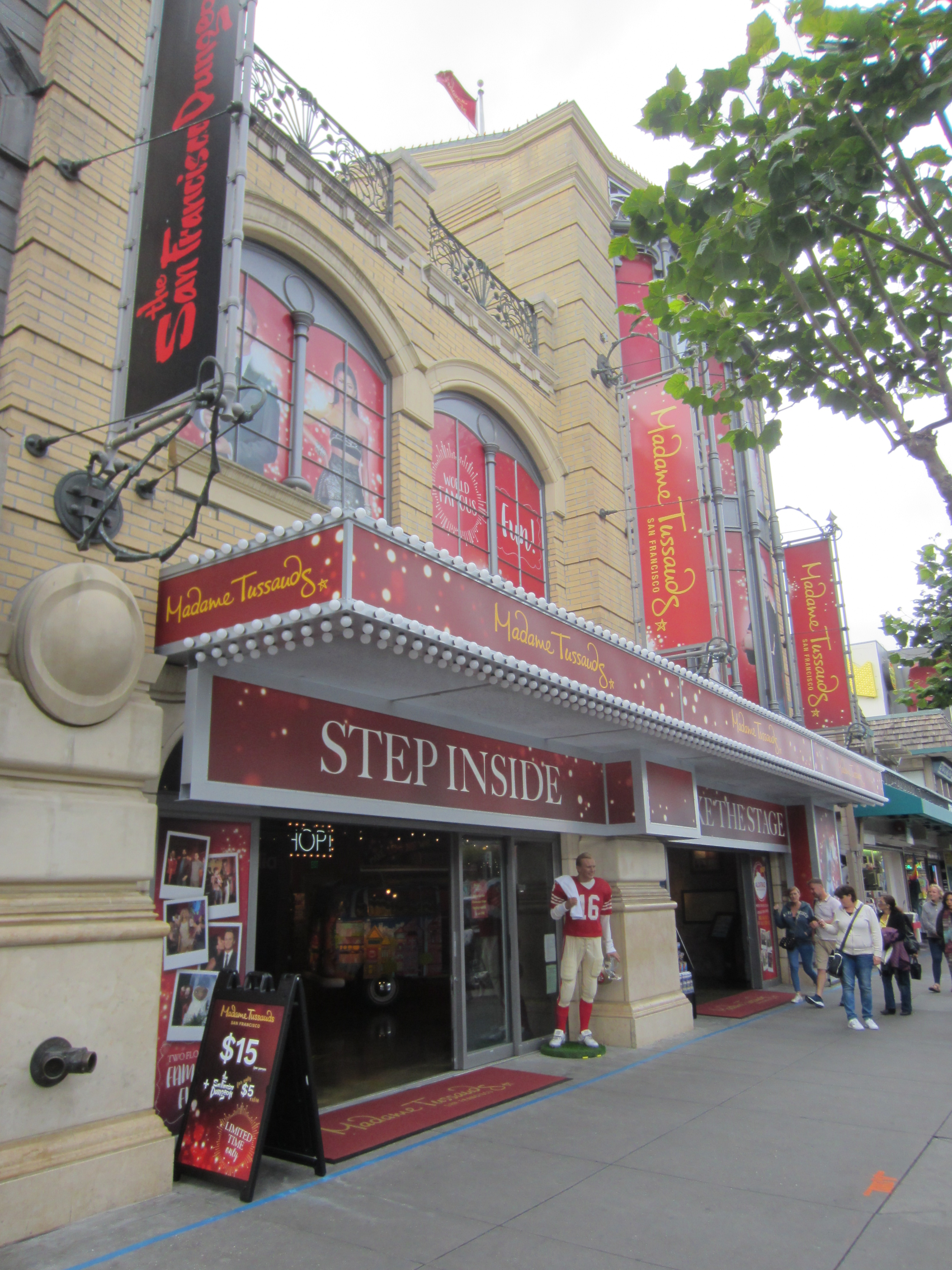
- Madame Tussauds in San Francisco's Fisherman's Wharf, pictured in 2018

Fisherman's Wharf, San Francisco
- Status: Closed
- Opening date: June 26, 2014
- Closing date: August 3, 2024

Ride statistics
- Attraction type: Wax Museum

Madame Tussauds San Francisco was a wax museum located in Fisherman's Wharf, San Francisco in California. The attraction opened on June 26, 2014, and became the 17th Madame Tussauds museum to open worldwide. Madame Tussauds San Francisco closed on August 3, 2024, after 10 years in operation. The attraction featured wax figures of famous figures from movies, music, politics, popular culture and sport. It also celebrated “The Spirit of San Francisco” with wax figures of local artists, musicians and activists from the city's past.

== History ==
In 2013, Merlin Entertainments signed a lease with the Wax Museum at Fishermans Wharf to transform the venue into both the Madame Tussauds wax attraction and the San Francisco Dungeon. The Wax Museum had operated for 50 years and had over 270 wax figures. The San Francisco Dungeon later closed during the COVID-19 pandemic lockdown and did not reopen. Merlin Entertainments closed Madame Tussauds San Francisco on August 3, 2024, ending a 60-year history of wax museums in Fisherman's Wharf. The majority of the wax figures from the San Francisco location were distributed to the 23 other Madame Tussauds locations globally.

== Notable figures ==
Abraham Lincoln | Adele | Al Capone | Alfred Hitchcock | Anne Hathaway
Babe Ruth | Barack Obama | Benjamin Franklin | Beyoncé Knowles | Billie Jean King
Bob Marley | Bruce Lee | Carlos Santana | Christian Bale | Clint Eastwood
Dalai Lama | E.T. The Extra Terrestrial | Ed Lee | Elton John | Elvis Presley
Francis Ford Coppola | Gabby Douglas | George Washington | Harvey Milk | Jackie Chan
Janis Joplin | Jeremy Lin | Jerry Garcia | Jimi Hendrix | Joe Montana
John Travolta | Johnny Depp | Joe Biden | Kamala Harris | Kate Winslet
Lady Gaga | Laverne Cox | Leonardo DiCaprio | Madonna | Marilyn Monroe
Mark Zuckerberg | Martin Luther King Jr. | Michael Jackson | Michael Phelps | Morgan Freeman
Muhammad Ali | Neil Patrick Harris | Nicolas Cage | Peter Dinklage | Pink (singer)
Rihanna | Robert Pattinson | Robin Williams | Rosa Parks | Sam Smith
Serena Williams | Stephen Curry | Steve Jobs | Steve McQueen | Steve Wozniak
Steven Spielberg | Taylor Swift | Tiger Woods | Tony Bennett | Tupac Shakur
Katy Perry | Jennifer Aniston | Whoopi Goldberg | Zendaya

== See also ==
- Marie Tussaud
- Madame Tussauds, London
- Chamber of Horrors (Madame Tussauds)
- Madame Tussauds Rock Circus (1989–2001, London)
- Madame Tussauds Delhi
- Madame Tussauds Hollywood
- Madame Tussauds Hong Kong
- Madame Tussauds Las Vegas
- Madame Tussauds New York
- Madame Tussauds Shanghai
- Madame Tussauds Singapore
- Madame Tussauds Sydney
- Madame Tussauds Washington D.C.
- Merlin Entertainments
