= Madame Tussauds New York =

Wax museum in New York City

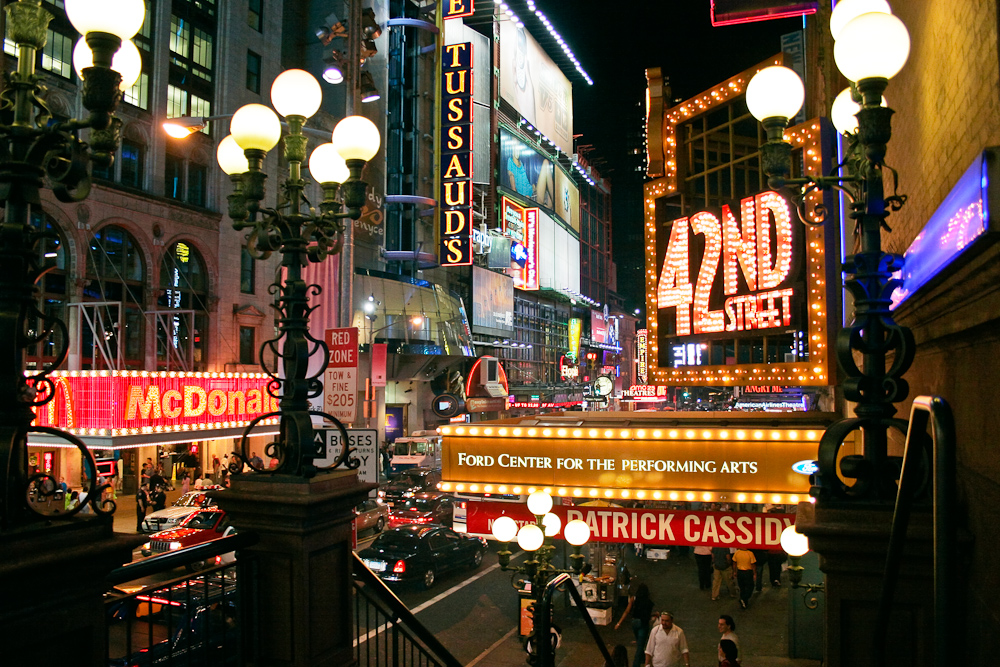
- Madame Tussauds on 42nd Street in Times Square, Midtown Manhattan, New York City
- Established: November 15, 2000; 25 years ago
- Location: Times Square, Midtown Manhattan, New York City, New York, United States
- Founder: Marie Tussaud
- Website: www.madametussauds.com/new-york/en/

Madame Tussauds New York (UK /təˈsɔːdz/, US /tuːˈsoʊz/; the family themselves pronounce it /ˈtuːsoʊ/) is a tourist attraction located on 42nd Street in the Times Square neighborhood of Midtown Manhattan in New York City. Madame Tussauds was founded by the wax sculptor Marie Tussaud, and is now operated by the United Kingdom-based entertainment company Merlin Entertainments. The Madame Tussauds New York location opened on November 15, 2000, after seven years of planning.

== History ==
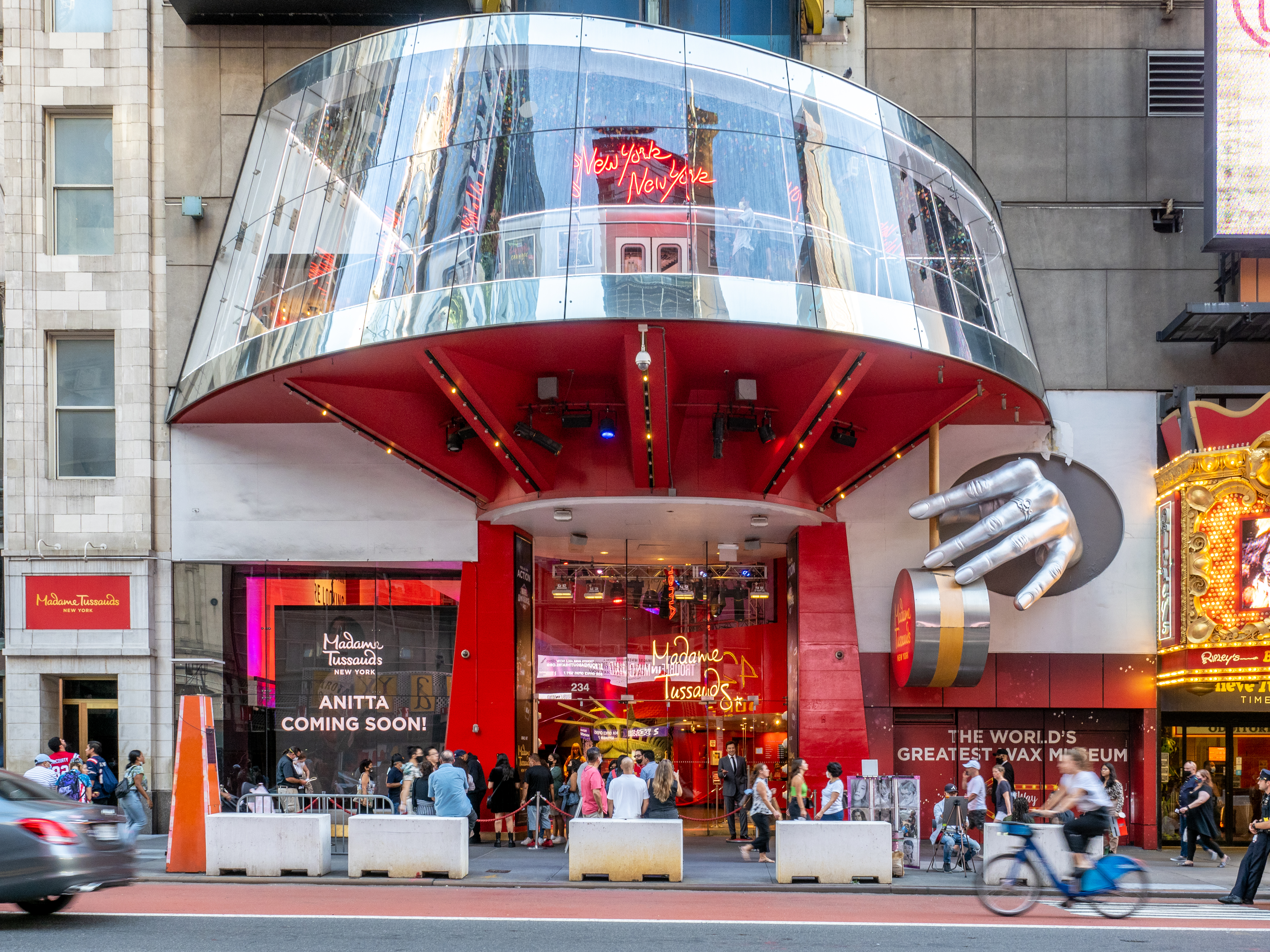
(2021)

=== Background ===
Marie Tussaud was born as Marie Grosholtz in 1761 in Strasbourg, France. Her mother worked as a housekeeper for Dr. Philippe Curtius in Bern, Switzerland, who was a physician skilled in wax modelling. Curtius taught Tussaud the art of wax modelling.

In 1777, Tussaud created her first wax sculpture of Voltaire and soon after began sculpting death masks of notable victims in the French Revolution. These masks were then held up as revolutionary flags and paraded through the streets of Paris. In 1794, Marie's mentor, Dr. Phillipe Curtius, died and Tussaud inherited his entire collection.

Marie married Francois Tussaud in 1795 and lent a new name to the show: Madame Tussaud's. By 1835, Marie had settled down in Baker Street, London, and opened a museum, Madame Tussaud's. This part of the exhibition included victims of the French Revolution and newly created figures of murderers and other criminals. Several famous people were added to the exhibition, including Lord Nelson, and Sir Walter Scott. Some of the sculptures done by Marie Tussaud herself still exist. The gallery originally contained some 400 different figures, but fire damage in 1925, coupled with German bombs in 1941, has rendered most of these older models defunct. The casts themselves have survived allowing the historical waxworks to be remade. These can be seen in the museum's history exhibit. The oldest figure on display is that of Madame du Barry, otherwise known as "sleeping beauty", and this figure is located at Madame Tussauds London. In 1842, Tussaud made a self-portrait which is now on display at several Madame Tussauds locations. On 15 April 1850, Madame Tussaud died in her sleep.

In 1883, the restricted space and rising cost of the Baker Street site prompted Marie Tussaud's grandson, Joseph Randall, to commission the building at its current location on Marylebone Road. The new exhibition galleries were opened on 14 July 1884 and were a great success. A limited company was formed in 1888 to attract fresh capital but had to be dissolved after disagreements between the family shareholders. In February 1889, The Tussaud's group was sold to a group of businessmen led by Edwin Josiah Poyse.

=== Current status ===
Madame Tussauds museums are currently owned by Merlin Entertainments after the acquisition of The Tussauds Group in May 2007.

== Notable figures ==
A list of some of the figures:

Actors	Musicians	Athletes	Leaders	Icons	Characters	Television	Fashion
Jennifer Aniston	Pharrell Williams	Sachin Tendulkar	Joe Biden	Albert Einstein	E.T.	Jimmy Fallon	Adriana Lima
Leonardo DiCaprio	Selena Gomez	Muhammad Ali	Kamala Harris	Marilyn Monroe	Iron Man	Michael Strahan	Sofía Vergara
Jodie Foster	Justin Bieber	Lionel Messi	Abraham Lincoln	Charlie Chaplin	Spider-Man	Jon Hamm	Kylie Jenner
Angelina Jolie	Ariana Grande	Eli Manning	John F. Kennedy	Jacqueline Bouvier Kennedy	The Incredible Hulk	Anderson Cooper	Victoria Beckham
Priyanka Chopra	Shawn Mendes	Derek Jeter	Mahatma Gandhi	James Dean	King Kong	Kris Jenner	Heidi Klum
Ranveer Singh	Taylor Swift	David Wright	Martin Luther King Jr.	Mark Zuckerberg	Captain Marvel	Oprah Winfrey	Alessandra Ambrosio
Julia Roberts	Harry Styles	Cristiano Ronaldo	Donald Trump	Michael Jackson	Grizabella	Kim Kardashian	Kendall Jenner
Zac Efron	Lady Gaga	Kobe Bryant	Barack Obama	Elvis Presley	Captain America	Barbara Walters	Anna Wintour
Shah Rukh Khan	Dua Lipa	Michael Jordan	Dalai Lama	Frida Kahlo	Terminator	Jenna Marbles	Tyra Banks
Deepika Padukone	J Balvin	Usain Bolt	Ronald Reagan	Frank Sinatra	Nick Fury	Al Roker	Billy Porter
Salman Khan	Shakira	Babe Ruth	Bill Clinton	Audrey Hepburn	The Phantom	RuPaul	Winnie Harlow
Katrina Kaif	Ricky Martin	Carmelo Anthony	Lyndon B. Johnson	Andrew Lloyd Webber	Black Panther	Andy Cohen	
Tom Cruise	Bad Bunny	Vinícius Júnior	Rosa Parks	Baba Ramdev	Annabelle	Bill Nye	
George Clooney	Rihanna	Michael Phelps	Richard Nixon	Benjamin Franklin	The Nun		
Anne Hathaway	Drake	Stephen Curry	George W. Bush	Danelle Morgan	Regan MacNeil		
Simu Liu	Katy Perry		George Washington	Elon Musk	Pennywise		
Zendaya	Anitta			Lin-Manuel Miranda	Patty Tolan		
Neil Patrick Harris	Daft Punk				Erin Gilbert		
Sandra Bullock	Ed Sheeran				Jillian Holtzmann		
Matthew McConaughey	Maluma				Abby Yates		
Awkwafina	Adele				James Conrad		
Johnny Depp	Beyoncé				Loki		
Sarah Michelle Gellar	Nicki Minaj						
Brad Pitt	Avicii						
Morgan Freeman	Jonas Brothers						
Whoopi Goldberg	Jennifer Lopez						
Timothée Chalamet	Megan Thee Stallion						
Salma Hayek	Jennifer Hudson						
Jamie Foxx	Pink						
Kate Winslet	Sam Smith						
Drew Barrymore	Mariah Carey						
	Bruno Mars						
	Romeo Santos						
	Alicia Keys						
	Austin Mahone						
	Karol G						
	Lil Nas X						

== See also ==
- Madame Tussauds Washington D.C.
- Madame Tussauds Hollywood
- Madame Tussauds Las Vegas
- Madame Tussauds San Francisco
