= Carla DiBello =

American film producer

Carla DiBello is an American businesswoman, executive film and television producer, and Harper's Bazaar Arabia and Arab News columnist. DiBello is also founder and CEO of CDB Advisory, a consulting firm. DiBello helped PIF negotiate a $445 million deal to buy a majority stake in England's Newcastle United football team with Amanda Staveley.

== Film and television ==
DiBello worked with Kim Kardashian on Keeping Up With The Kardashians and has worked on Kourtney & Kim take New York.

DiBello's first documentary, “Electric Kingdom,” about Saudi Arabia's first Formula E race, explores the reforms underway in Saudi Arabia. Recently, she produced the Saudi film Maskoon, premiering at the Red Sea Film Festival.

DiBello is funding the 2022 launch of streaming platform Arabia Plus to provide Arab films and content.
