= Kral Şakir =

Turkish animated series

- Genre: Animated series Comedy; Adventure; Slice of Life
- Created by: Varol Yaşaroğlu; Berk Tokay; Haluk Can Dizdaroğlu
- Written by: Haluk Can Dizdaroğlu and Berk Tokay
- Directed by: Berk Tokay; Kuntay Kumbur
- Voices of: Mustafa Oral; Atilla Şendil; Levent Ünsal (2016-2020); Emre Turanlı (2020-present); Didem Atlıhan; Sema Kahriman; Barış Özgenç; Onur Akgülgil; Sedat Yılmaz; Sinan Divrik; Hakan Akın
- Composer: Kadir Süzgün
- Country of origin: Turkey
- Original language: Turkish
- No. of seasons: 9
- No. of episodes: 333 (list of episodes)

Production
- Producer: Varol Yaşaroğlu
- Running time: 11 minutes
- Production company: Grafi2000

Original release
- Network: Cartoon Network Turkey
- Release: May 16, 2016 – present

King Şakir (Turkish: Kral Şakir) is a Turkish animated television series created by Varol Yaşaroğlu, Berk Tokay and Haluk Can Dizdaroğlu and produced by Grafi2000 for Cartoon Network Turkey,and Boomerang Turkey. The series' sneak peek premiered on April 23, 2016. It premiered officially on May 16, 2016 as Cartoon Network Turkey's first local series. In 2024, the animated series began airing in Russia on the Солнце channel.

A spinoff series, Kral Şakir Mini was released on New Year's Eve in 2024. The series targets music videos towards preschoolers.

== Premise ==
The series tells the adventures of an anthropomorphic lion named Şakir who lives with his little sister, a cat named Canan, mother named Kadriye, whose also a cat, and his lion dad Remzi, his adopted 120-year-old tortoise father, Peyami, and their best friend, Necati, a purple elephant. There is also Mirket, a brown meerkat scientist who has a laboratory, and Tanju, a brown homeless dog who lives on the streets and is unemployed. The three main villains of the show are Kürşat, Ercan, and Necmi, who are a vulture, a gorilla, and a fox respectively. Starting in episode 235, Nejati's cousin, a pink elephant named Filsu is introduced, she is the first character on the show to be disabled, and uses a wheelchair to get around. The show is set in an animated version of İstanbul, but includes magic, spaceships and parallel realms.

== Adaptations ==
The show has been adapted into several feature films, including a stage show called Kral Şakir, Uzdaya Şamata which is about the characters going into space. The first film, Kral Şakir: Oyun Zamanı ("Let the Game Begin"), was released in theaters on 11 May 2018. The second film, Kral Şakir: Korsanlar Diyarı ("Land of Pirates"), was released in theaters on 4 October 2019. The third film, Kral Şakir: Mikrop Avcıları, was released on the Turkish streaming service Exxen exclusively on 22 January 2021. Kral Şakir: Cumperlop ("Splash") was also released on Exxen as an exclusive on 23 April 2021. The next movie, Kral Şakir: Geri Dönüşüm ("Recycle") was released in theaters on 14 July 2022. Later, the movie was shown on Disney+ internationally, starting in January 2023. The next movie, Kral Şakir: Devler Uyandı was released in theaters on 16 February 2024.

== Episodes ==
=== Season 1 ===
| No. overall | No. in season | Title | Directed by | Written by |
|---|---|---|---|---|
| 1 | 1 | "Trash Room" | Berk Tokay | Haluk Can Dizdaroğlu |
| 2 | 2 | "Filmmakers" | Berk Tokay | Haluk Can Dizdaroğlu |
| 3 | 3 | "Peyami's List" | Berk Tokay | Haluk Can Dizdaroğlu |
| 4 | 4 | "Food Wars" | Berk Tokay | Haluk Can Dizdaroğlu |
| 5 | 5 | "Far Away Shopping Mall" | Berk Tokay | Haluk Can Dizdaroğlu |
| 6 | 6 | "Broken TV Set" | Berk Tokay | Haluk Can Dizdaroğlu |
| 7 | 7 | "Alone and Furious" | Berk Tokay | Haluk Can Dizdaroğlu |
| 8 | 8 | "Golden Day" | Berk Tokay | Haluk Can Dizdaroğlu |
| 9 | 9 | "Housework" | Berk Tokay | Haluk Can Dizdaroğlu |
| 10 | 10 | "Super Joystick" | Berk Tokay | Haluk Can Dizdaroğlu |
| 11 | 11 | "Dads Are Competing" | Berk Tokay | Haluk Can Dizdaroğlu |
| 12 | 12 | "The Oldest Sport" | Berk Tokay | Haluk Can Dizdaroğlu |
| 13 | 13 | "Holy Bone Hunters" | Berk Tokay | Haluk Can Dizdaroğlu |
| 14 | 14 | "There's Someone Inside Me" | Berk Tokay | Haluk Can Dizdaroğlu |
| 15 | 15 | "Insect Necati" | Berk Tokay | Haluk Can Dizdaroğlu |
| 16 | 16 | "Chickens on the Run" | Berk Tokay | Haluk Can Dizdaroğlu |
| 17 | 17 | "Shakir's Dream" | Berk Tokay | Haluk Can Dizdaroğlu |
| 18 | 18 | "Origami" | Berk Tokay | Haluk Can Dizdaroğlu |
| 19 | 19 | "April Fools" | Berk Tokay | Haluk Can Dizdaroğlu |
| 20 | 20 | "Pottery" | Berk Tokay | Haluk Can Dizdaroğlu |
| 21 | 21 | "Shakir's Clones" | Berk Tokay | Haluk Can Dizdaroğlu |
| 22 | 22 | "Drone" | Berk Tokay | Haluk Can Dizdaroğlu |
| 23 | 23 | "Mysterious Neighbor" | Berk Tokay | Haluk Can Dizdaroğlu |
| 24 | 24 | "Sofa Kingdom" | Berk Tokay | Haluk Can Dizdaroğlu |
| 25 | 25 | "With Great Power Comes Great Responsibility" | Berk Tokay | Haluk Can Dizdaroğlu |
| 26 | 26 | "Unhappy Whale" | Berk Tokay | Haluk Can Dizdaroğlu |
| 27 | 27 | "There Is a Village Far, Far Away" | Berk Tokay | Haluk Can Dizdaroğlu |
| 28 | 28 | "Runaway Groom" | Berk Tokay | Haluk Can Dizdaroğlu |
| 29 | 29 | "Rosie" | Berk Tokay | Haluk Can Dizdaroğlu |
| 30 | 30 | "Clean Sea" | Berk Tokay | Haluk Can Dizdaroğlu |
| 31 | 31 | "Pixel Adventure" | Berk Tokay | Haluk Can Dizdaroğlu |
| 32 | 32 | "Funfair" | Berk Tokay | Haluk Can Dizdaroğlu |

=== Season 2 ===
| No. overall | No. in season | Title | Directed by | Written by |
|---|---|---|---|---|
| 33 | 1 | "The Last Voyager" | Berk Tokay | Haluk Can Dizdaroğlu |
| 34 | 2 | "Action Star" | Berk Tokay | Haluk Can Dizdaroğlu |
| 35 | 3 | "Beyond" | Berk Tokay | Haluk Can Dizdaroğlu |
| 36 | 4 | "Ladle Man" | Berk Tokay | Haluk Can Dizdaroğlu |
| 37 | 5 | "Exam Night" | Berk Tokay | Haluk Can Dizdaroğlu |
| 38 | 6 | "Missing Cake" | Berk Tokay | Haluk Can Dizdaroğlu |
| 39 | 7 | "Answers" | Berk Tokay | Haluk Can Dizdaroğlu |
| 40 | 8 | "Refrigerator" | Berk Tokay | Haluk Can Dizdaroğlu |
| 41 | 9 | "E-Sports" | Berk Tokay | Haluk Can Dizdaroğlu |
| 42 | 10 | "Rise of the Snowman" | Berk Tokay | Haluk Can Dizdaroğlu |
| 43 | 11 | "Dinosaur Flu" | Berk Tokay | Haluk Can Dizdaroğlu |
| 44 | 12 | "Sleepless" | Berk Tokay | Haluk Can Dizdaroğlu |
| 45 | 13 | "Spoonmaker's Diamond" | Berk Tokay | Haluk Can Dizdaroğlu |
| 46 | 14 | "World's Biggest Watermelon" | Berk Tokay | Haluk Can Dizdaroğlu |
| 47 | 15 | "Attic" | Berk Tokay | Haluk Can Dizdaroğlu |
| 48 | 16 | "Shaman" | Berk Tokay | Haluk Can Dizdaroğlu |
| 49 | 17 | "Game Fair" | Berk Tokay | Haluk Can Dizdaroğlu |
| 50 | 18 | "Hair" | Berk Tokay | Haluk Can Dizdaroğlu |
| 51 | 19 | "Mysterious Meteor" | Berk Tokay | Haluk Can Dizdaroğlu |
| 52 | 20 | "Awesome Duo" | Berk Tokay | Haluk Can Dizdaroğlu |
| 53 | 21 | "with Sodany.." | Berk Tokay | Haluk Can Dizdaroğlu |
| 54 | 22 | "Rather Danger dsfer" | Berk Tokay | Haluk Can Dizdaroğlu |
| 56 | 24 | "The Guardians of Art" | Berk Tokay | Haluk Can Dizdaroğlu |

== Cast ==
| Voice overs | Characters |
|---|---|
| Mustafa Oral | Şakir |
| Atilla Şendil | Remzi |
| Levent Ünsal (2016–20); Emre Turanlı (2020-present) | Necati |
| Didem Atlıhan | Canan |
| Sema Kahriman | Kadriye |
| Barış Özgenç | Kürşat |
| Onur Akgülgil | Mirket |
| Sedat Yılmaz | Peyami |
| Sinan Divrik | Ercan |
| Hakan Akın | Tanju |
