= Rock Circus =

Former wax figure exhibition in London

Coordinates: 51.5103°N 0.1340°W

Madame Tussaud's Rock Circus (August 1989 – September 2001) was a walk-through exhibition celebrating the history of rock and pop music, featuring its major figures recreated in wax. It was located at the top four floors of the then-newly refurbished London Pavilion building at Piccadilly Circus, London. Predominantly British artists featured, but many American artists were also included. The attraction told the story of rock and pop from the 1950s to the then-present day by using videos, music, narration and audio-animatronic figures.

== Beginnings ==
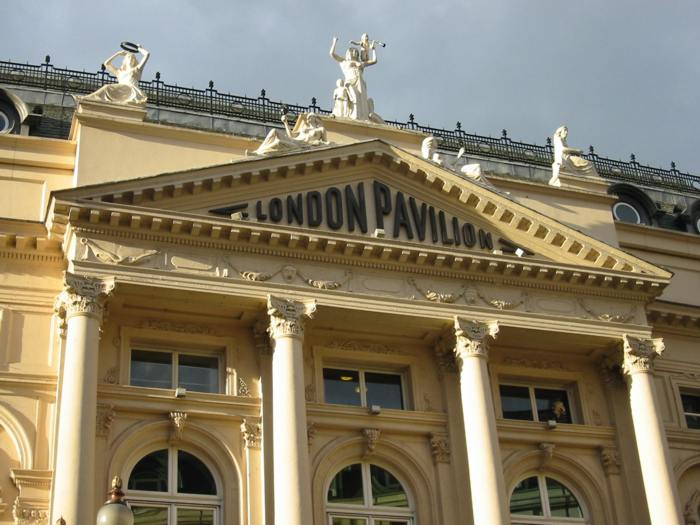
The London Pavilion, former site of Rock Circus

In the mid-1980s, the Tussauds Group began looking for a new attraction venture in London, having just been involved in the development of Chessington World of Adventures theme park in Surrey. Market research discovered that focus groups were attracted to the idea of a music-based tourist attraction, as opposed to other concepts suggested, such as an exhibition on the history of the city.

Deciding which musical stars should be represented in the exhibitions was left to general manager Martin King, head of Tussauds Studios Ian Hanson, and national radio DJ and music writer Paul Gambaccini. The exhibition was opened in 1989 by Jason Donovan but closed permanently in September 2001.

The attraction was built in the top four floors of the newly refurbished London Pavilion building at Piccadilly Circus, London. It featured wax figures similar to Madame Tussauds original venue, as well as an animatronic finale show. The audio-animatronic figures took up to a year to create and, depending on the complexity of movement involved, cost up to $170,000 each. The control systems for the last floor exhibition were provided by Electrosonic Ltd. Multi control system for the lower floors and Infrared headset system was provided by Sycomore SA (Fr)

== Exhibition ==
Visitors walked around the exhibition wearing headphones which used infra-red technology to beam relevant audio material according to what you were looking at. The centrepiece of the exhibition was a 'live' show performed by a series of lifelike animatronic figures, looking at the history of Rock music from 1950 to the present day. The audience sat in an auditorium which rotated to view the various stages.

Many of the performers featured in the exhibition donated their own clothes; Paul Simon, Mark Knopfler of Dire Straits, Eric Clapton and Phil Collins all donated items amongst others, with Simon sending a guitar and a pair of jeans for his wax figure and Knopfler a pair of his boots and a shirt to copy.

Visitors would be given a set of wireless re-chargeable headphones (infrared transmission) and follow a path walking amongst the first floor's exhibits. Each exhibit had its own audio track playing on a loop to the headphones, once guests moved in-range of the infra-red signal. The audio featured narration by Paul Gambaccini, who discussed the performer the relevant exhibit was for, along with short clips of their music, with these descriptions typically lasting no more than a few minutes each. Guests could also occasionally have pictures taken with the wax figures.

The main atrium featured a rotating set with the figures of Elton John performing "Bennie and the Jets," Little Richard singing "Tutti Frutti" and Stevie Wonder with "I Just Called to Say I Love You", with the two former seated at pianos, whilst Wonder sat at a three-keyboard synthesizer, all pointing into the centre of the stage. At pre-determined intervals of a few minutes or so, a figure of Elvis Presley would rise up between the three pianos to sing "Glory Hallelujah", before dropping back down out of sight.

The remaining floors followed the same pattern, with various music performers modelled in different backdrops or scenes, or posed in balconies and walkways and visitors moved between them via escalators and lifts as needed. These scenes included;

- A large hanging video display, composed of 36 monitors linked together to create one big "screen".
- References to the Live Aid music concert and Woodstock music festival.
- A VIP area featuring Elvis Presley and Bono
- A Memorabilia corridor
- A 1960s London street scene, featuring Tina Turner.
- The Beatles, in a recreation of their The Cavern Club set
- Boy George, seated on top of a bin, just outside the main entrance.
- "Wall of Hands", which was a wall-mounted collection of palm imprint casts of various rock musicians of the time, much like those at the TCL Chinese Theatre in Los Angeles.
- Buddy Holly, featuring rare audio of an interview held with DJ Alan Freed, in a radio studio scene.
- Jerry Lee Lewis, playing a stand-up piano which featured an opening and closing lid, with a dry ice smoke effect whilst audio from "Great Balls of Fire" played.
- Sting, in a recording "booth" set-up.
- The Who, represented by a recreation of a large electro-mechanical pinball machine, complete with Roger Daltrey standing atop the playing field glass, and with Pete Townshend mounted on a metal supporting rod, appearing to jump out of the machine's back-glass, whilst sections of Elton John's version of "Pinball Wizard" from the movie version of Tommy were played.

The escalator leading to the top and last floor was inside a perspex tunnel containing rings of neon lights and other lighting effects, and captioned with a sign "Stairway to Heaven", referencing the Led Zeppelin song of the same name. At the top of this escalator the floor opened out into a small area where visitors could watch music videos and similar content via ceiling mounted screens, while waiting for the finale show.

This area also featured a Madame Tussauds attraction regular feature; that of a waxwork representing a member of the public or staff, and placed in-situ in the attraction; one pair of seats below a monitor just prior to the theatre show was occupied by a male waxwork looking up, as if watching the screen above him. This was similar to a feature at the main Madame Tussauds attraction located in Marylebone Road, which had a female waxwork standing at the Information counter, dressed in the same uniform as genuine members of staff, compete with the name tag "Maude" and which caught out many visitors to the attraction seeking assistance at the counter.

Visitors would then walk to the theatre entrance and take any seat from the staggered seating. The show lasted approximately 15 minutes and comprised many animatronic figures.

After the show, visitors exited the theatre and were guided to a spiral staircase taking them down to a lower level, and complete with music photographs and images mounted on the walls surrounding it. This took visitors to a small gift shop selling Rock Circus-branded merchandise, camera film, and other items. This was also where they could purchase any of their photographs taken earlier by the Rock Circus staff.

From the gift shop another staircase led down and back to the headphone charging station, where visitors dropped off their headphones and exited back into the main London Pavilion building.

== Artists featured ==
Amongst the artists featured as waxworks, in video, or as other exhibits were:

- The Beatles
- Jon Bon Jovi
- Bono, of U2
- Boy George of Culture Club
- Cher
- Eric Clapton
- Phil Collins
- Sam Cooke
- Lonnie Donegan
- Jason Donovan
- Gloria Estefan
- Bryan Ferry of Roxy Music
- Aretha Franklin
- Bob Geldof
- Billy Idol
- Marc Bolan, of T-Rex
- Buddy Holly
- Iron Maiden
- The Jacksons
- Janet Jackson
- Michael Jackson
- Elton John
- Bon Jovi
- Mark Knopfler, of Dire Straits, playing guitar
- Jerry Lee Lewis
- Liberace
- Little Richard, performing "Tutti Frutti"
- Bob Marley (redeployed at the main Madame Tussauds attraction)
- Madonna
- Freddie Mercury, of Queen
- George Michael
- Robert Plant of Led Zeppelin
- Elvis Presley
- Cliff Richard
- Johnny Rotten, from the Sex Pistols
- Status Quo's Francis Rossi, and Rick Parfitt, up in a small balcony alcove playing guitars
- Paul Simon and Art Garfunkel, performing "Mrs Robinson"
- Rod Stewart, declared as "The Benny Hill of Pop" by Gambaccini's narration
- Sting
- Tina Turner
- The Who, represented by Roger Daltrey and Pete Townshend.
- Stevie Wonder
- Mick Hucknall of Simply Red
- Jarvis Cocker of Pulp (band)

To celebrate the opening of the new museum and to decorate the outside of the building, a series of rock legend statues were installed around the London Pavilion exterior. Artists featured were Annie Lennox, Buddy Holly, David Bowie, Diana Ross, Elton John, Gary Glitter, Jimi Hendrix, Madonna, Michael Jackson and Mick Jagger.

== End Theatre Finale "Live" Show ==
The revolving theatre "live" show formed the last part of the attraction, and featured a number of animatronic performers, using the then-ground breaking pneumatic or otherwise known as air-compression technology, being seen for the first time in the UK at that time. More than 200 computer-generated signals were used to lift the figure of Bruce Springsteen's guitar-strumming right arm to the familiar raised fist when performing "Born in the U.S.A."

Visitors entered the theatre and took up places on two rows of height-staggered seating, facing a stage area, and positioned on a turn-table (although this last point was not made obvious as not to spoil any surprise when the seats rotated. Once the seating was filled or at a pre-determined point the doors would be closed, and the show was started.

Various animatronic performers would play out parts, with narration and linking dialogue provided by an animatronic Tim Rice, seen seated in a swivel chair, or via voice representation only at other points during the performance.

Approximately halfway through the performance, the whole seating area was rotated to face a second stage area which accommodated further animatronic performers and features. The music that played whilst the stage rotated was the opening piano bars of Elton John's Bennie and the Jets song.

Once the show had completed after around 10 minutes, the lights were raised again, and visitors exited the theatre.

The performance begun with The Beatles, in full Sergeant Pepper's Lonely Hearts Club Band costumes, performing an extract of the title track of the album, and went on include video, audio and animatronic representations of music stars and celebrities including:

- Janis Joplin, with the animatronic starting at a seated position on a park bench, discussing those musicians that died during the Summer of Love, before going to a standing position and singing Me and Bobby McGee while holding a Southern Comfort bottle. Additionally, a bee or similar insect was seen flying around a rubbish bin placed beside the park bench, suspended on a wire)
- Madonna, performing an extract of her Like A Virgin song, and presented lying on a bed surrounded by silk curtains. These were automatically drawn back to reveal the artist at the start of her section. A green-eyed animatronic leopard was also placed at the foot of the bed, and made a roaring sound, along with its eyes lighting up as the extract finished, the lights dimmed, and the curtains closed. This particular animatronic was unique within the performance in that it was the only one that played an instrument, rather than simply moving its hands, face, eyes, and lips in-time to the music; the animatronic held a tambourine in its left hand and at two points in its performance during the chorus of the song, it would shake the tambourine.
- Bruce Springsteen, performing "Born in the USA" on a recreation of a stadium stage; cut-out raised arms appeared at the front of the stage and moved from left to right and back again, along with Dry-ice "smoke" being produced, to help give the effect.
- Elvis Presley, singing "Love Me Tender".
- Bob Dylan performing "The Times They Are a-Changin'" with guitar and harmonica.
- David Bowie, as the character Major Tom, dressed in a spacesuit, and performing "Space Oddity". This mimicked the section of the music video for the song, where a fully outfitted Major Tom can be seen spinning around in space, with a panicked Ground Control attempting to contact him. The lighting was set so that only the head of the animatronic was well-lit by a spotlight, with the body only lit by background illumination. This was intended to help hide the mechanics and rod that the figure was mounted on and which provided the spaceman's rotation effect. As the song reached the lines "Nothing I can do.. Nothing I can do", the spotlight and background lighting was switched off and replaced instantly by a projected film sequence of a spaceman receding away from the camera to infinity.
- Phil Collins, seen seated at a full-size drum kit, moving and playing in time to an excerpt from "In the Air Tonight".
- Kiss, with Gene Simmons' animatronic having a moving tongue
- Sid Vicious
- The Eurythmics, with a depiction of Annie Lennox's head in a scientist's laboratory scene, which then "split" (opened) down the middle to reveal a Dave Stewart head, whilst a section of Sweet Dreams (Are Made of This) was played.
- The Rolling Stones, represented by a large set of inflatable lips, which surrounding a television monitor playing video highlights of the band, whilst the music track (I Can't Get No) Satisfaction played.

As the auditorium rotated, the animatronic characters were revealed either from behind a curtain, or they were raised into view. The control systems for the animatronics were underneath the stage area of the theatre, out of sight of the audience.

The performance ended in the same manner as it started, with The Beatles, again in full "Sergeant Pepper's Lonely Hearts Club Band" costumes, performing an extract of the title track of the album.

The original set-up had audio fed to the audience via the infra-red headsets they wore in the rest of the attraction, but in later years, a sound system was installed to improve the quality of the sound.

== Reception ==
Initial reception and attendance was good, and year two estimates put expected attendance at upwards of 750,000, in comparison to the group's main Madame Tussaud's attraction, which was then the most popular tourist attraction in Great Britain, drawing 2.7 million visitors a year. Some music fans may have questioned the choices of figures and for example, it was thought that Americans may have been baffled by the inclusion of Lonnie Donegan, when many other notable artists, such as Jim Morrison, were not represented.

Tussards attempted to address this issue by polling visitors on who should be added to the exhibition, stating that the artists with the most votes would be made into figures and shown in a designated area.

Some visitors were not at all impressed with the exhibition and at least one thought everything at the museum was unintentionally funny and not very convincing.

== Major refurbishment 1998–1999 ==
The ageing technology was given a £4 million refurbishment in its ninth year and after a short closure period, it reopened in March 1999. New parts of the attraction included a virtual reality simulation of the view from a Wembley Stadium stage, and an after-show party set-up featuring Robbie Williams, The Spice Girls and Jarvis Cocker.

One aspect that was not updated in this refurbishment was a dot-matrix display mounted just below the waxworks present on the outside of the London Pavilion, and which used standard incandescent light bulbs. Originally, when the attraction opened, this read "Rock Circus" which was scrolled to give an impression of movement. Over time, more and more of the bulbs failed and were never replaced, leading to the sign becoming entirely illegible, although a number of bulbs still continued to cycle on and off. This was seen by many as an indication of the tackiness of what was little more than an expensive tourist trap.

== Closure in September 2001 ==
Despite the update a few years previously, and having attracted up 682,000 visitors during its heyday in 1993, the attraction failed to meet its income targets, and closed permanently in September 2001. The space it formerly used was then replaced by Ripley's Believe It or Not! museum (which opened 20 August 2008, and itself closed permanently on 25 September 2017).

Tussauds Group staff blamed the closure on the strength of the pound (making London an expensive destination for the young Europeans the attraction was largely aimed at), and a steady decline in visitor numbers, despite a reported 6 million total visitors since opening in 1989. Many of the waxwork figures were redeployed at the main Madame Tussauds exhibition, and Rock Circus staff were offered posts at other Tussauds Group attractions to minimize redundancies.

Although unconfirmed, all or a number of the other wax figures used at the attraction were placed into storage by Tussauds.

== See also ==
- Madame Tussauds
- London Pavilion
- London Eye
