= Madame Tussauds Shanghai =

Wax museum in Shanghai, China

Coordinates: 31°14′11″N 121°28′41″E

Madame Tussauds Shanghai (simplified Chinese: 上海杜莎夫人蜡像馆; traditional Chinese: 上海杜莎夫人蠟像館; pinyin: Shànghǎi Dùshā Fūrén Làxiàngguǎn) is a wax museum located on the 10th floor of the New World Department Store, Nanjing Xi Road, Shanghai, China. Opened May 1, 2006, it was the second Madame Tussauds museum to open in Asia after Madame Tussauds Hong Kong. It offers a mix of Chinese and western figures, from film stars to athletes and world leaders.

The museum contains several immersive zones, including a large-scale interactive immersive experience zone titled Madame Tussauds Music Dream Factory which utilizes augmented reality technology.

== Notable figures ==
| Sports | History and leaders | Music | Film | TV show | Fashion |
|---|---|---|---|---|---|
| Sun Yang | Vladimir Putin | Teresa Teng | Bruce Lee | Yang Yang | Hu Yitian |
| David Beckham | Barack Obama | Elvis Presley | Brad Pitt | Kangxi Lai Le | Victoria Beckham |
| Ronaldo | Nelson Mandela | Michael Jackson | Nicole Kidman | Zhou Libo | Angelababy |
| Michael Jordan | Bill Clinton | Lady Gaga | Angelina Jolie | Fan Bingbing | Robert Pattinson |
| Kobe Bryant | Winston Churchill | Madonna | Marilyn Monroe | Nicky Wu | Emma Watson |
| Liu Xiang | Tony Blair | Kylie Minogue | Audrey Hepburn | Sun Li | Carina Lau |
| Yao Ming | Duke of Sussex | Kris Wu | Donnie Yen | Hu Ge | |
| Su Yiming | Duchess of Sussex | S.H.E | Jackie Chan | Bai Lu | Yang Yang |
| Li Na | Aung San Suu Kyi | Andy Lau | Lee Min-ho | William Chan | |
| | Xi Jinping | Nicholas Tse | Chen Kun | Lay Zhang | |
| | Mao Zedong | Joker Xue | Yao Chen | Zhu Yilong | |
| | Donald Trump | G.E.M. | Cecilia Cheung | Luo Yunxi | |
| | Elizabeth II | TFBOYS | Michelle Yeoh | He Jiong | |
| | Mikhail Gorbachev | Justin Timberlake | Liam Hemsworth | | |
| | | Britney Spears | Ryan Gosling | | |
| | | Beyoncé | Gong Jun | | |
| | | Cai Xukun | Jiang Xin | | |
| | | Zhou Shen | | | |
| | | Jacky Cheung | | | |
| | | Olivia Newton-John | | | |
| | | Justin Bieber | | | |
| | | Taylor Swift | | | |
