= Madame Tussauds Sydney =

Wax museum in Sydney, Australia

Coordinates: 33.870°S 151.202°E

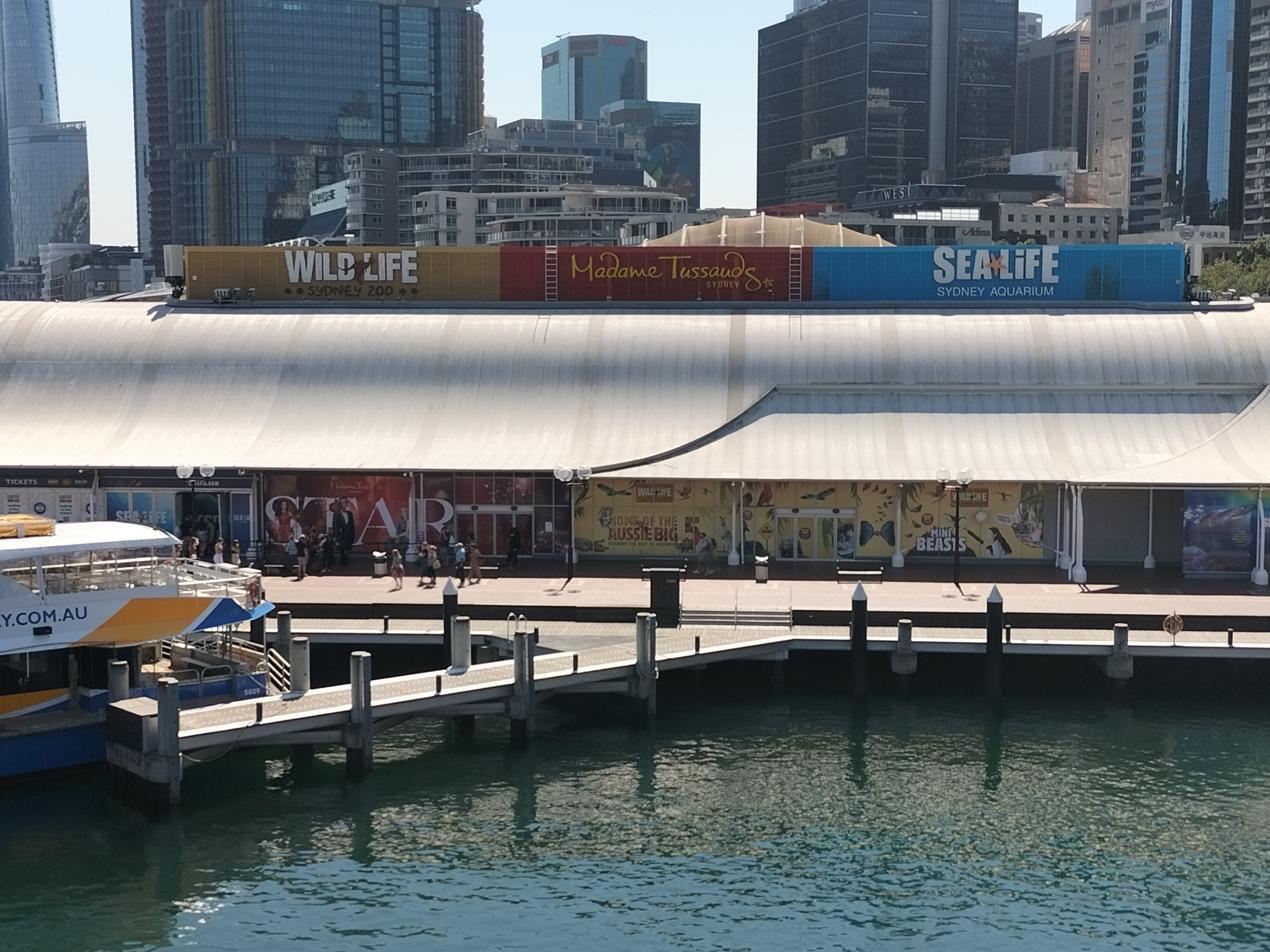

Sydney, New South Wales, Australia
- Status: Operating
- Opening date: 16 April 2012

Ride statistics
- Attraction type: Wax Museum
- Site area: 1,800 m^{2} (19,000 sq ft)
- Website: Official website
- Wheelchair accessible

Madame Tussauds Sydney is a wax museum located in Darling Harbour in Sydney, Australia and is situated on the Aquarium Wharf. Madame Tussauds is part of Merlin Entertainments which owns and operates attractions globally.

== History ==
Madame Tussauds Sydney opened in April 2012 and was the thirteenth Madame Tussauds to open in the world. The attraction is the only one of its kind in Australia.

== Exhibits ==
Madame Tussauds Sydney has a range of interactive experiences inside the attraction. Experiences include:

In 2015, Madame Tussauds Sydney launched simultaneously three different Madonna wax figures, making it the first time they revealed that amount of one female performer in their history.

Wild Australia & The Sitting Room	History & World Leaders	Sports	Pride	Sydney Live	Marvel	Film & TV	Justice League	Illuminate Sydney Party
Steve Irwin	Ned Kelly	Layne Beachley	Courtney Act	Troye Sivan	Wolverine	Bert Newton	Superman	Chris Hemsworth
Robert Irwin	Henry Parkes	Tim Cahill	Guy Pearce	Harry Styles	Spider-Man	Marilyn Monroe	Aquaman	Liam Hemsworth
Crocodile Dundee	Banjo Patterson	Sally Pearson	Lady Gaga	Pink	Iron Man	Curtis Stone	Wonder Woman	Nicole Kidman
Dannii Minogue	Henry Lawson	Cathy Freeman	Katy Perry	Taylor Swift	Captain Marvel	E.T. The Extra-Terrestrial	Batman	Ryan Gosling
Madame Marie Tussaud	Charles Kingsford Smith	Greg Inglis		John Farnham	Black Panther	Olivia Newton-John	The Flash	Johnny Depp
	King Charles III	Don Bradman		Keith Urban		Jackie Chan	Cyborg	Angelina Jolie
	Catherine, Princess of Wales and Prince William	Ian Thorpe		Jimmy Barnes		Audrey Hepburn		Cate Blanchett
	Bob Hawke	Dylan Alcott		Ricky Martin		Rove McManus		Eric Bana
	John Howard	Lleyton Hewitt		Rihanna		Amanda Keller		Brad Pitt
	Julia Gillard	Shane Warne		Kylie Minogue		Heath Ledger		Bruce Willis
	Eddie Mabo	Glenn McGrath		Michael Jackson		Ray Meagher		Leonardo DiCaprio
	Mahatma Gandhi	Sachin Tendulkar		G Flip		Ian Smith		Zendaya
	Barack Obama	Yao Ming		Diljit Dosanjh		Alfred Hitchcock		Beyoncé
	Nelson Mandela	Cristiano Ronaldo		Dua Lipa		Varun Dhawan		Priyanka Chopra Jonas
	Queen Elizabeth II					Jacob Elordi		Miranda Kerr
	Albert Einstein					Shah Rukh Khan		Elle Macpherson
	Victor Chang					Delta Goodrem		
	Meghan, Duchess of Sussex and Prince Harry					Rebel Wilson		
	Mary MacKillop					Jake Sully		
