= Madame Tussauds Singapore =

Wax museum and tourist attraction

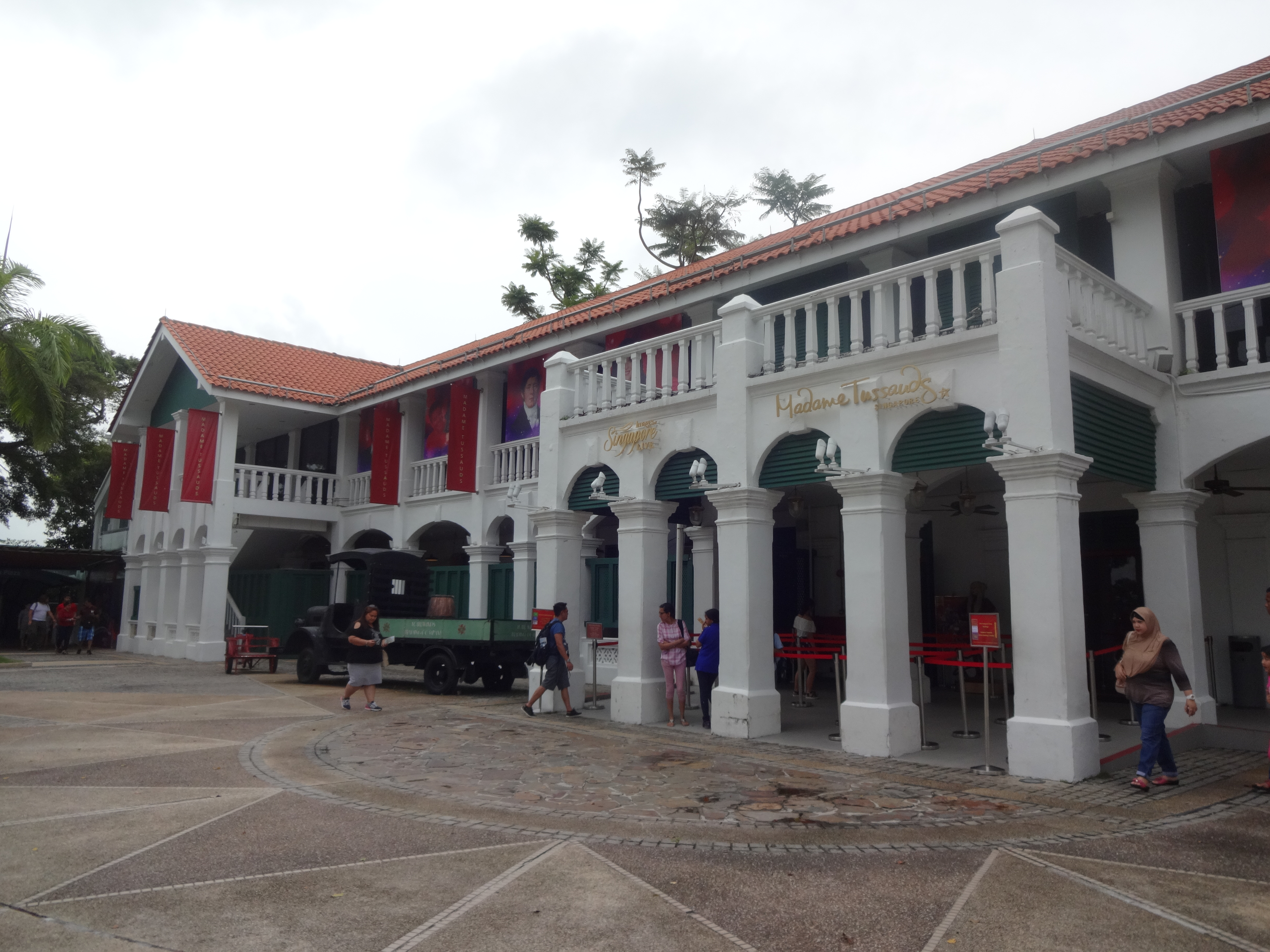
- Facade of Madame Tussauds Singapore, 29 December 2015

Imbiah Lookout
- Coordinates: 1.2540°N 103.8176°E
- Status: Operating
- Opening date: 25 October 2014; 11 years ago

Ride statistics
- Attraction type: Wax museum
- Manufacturer: Madame Tussauds

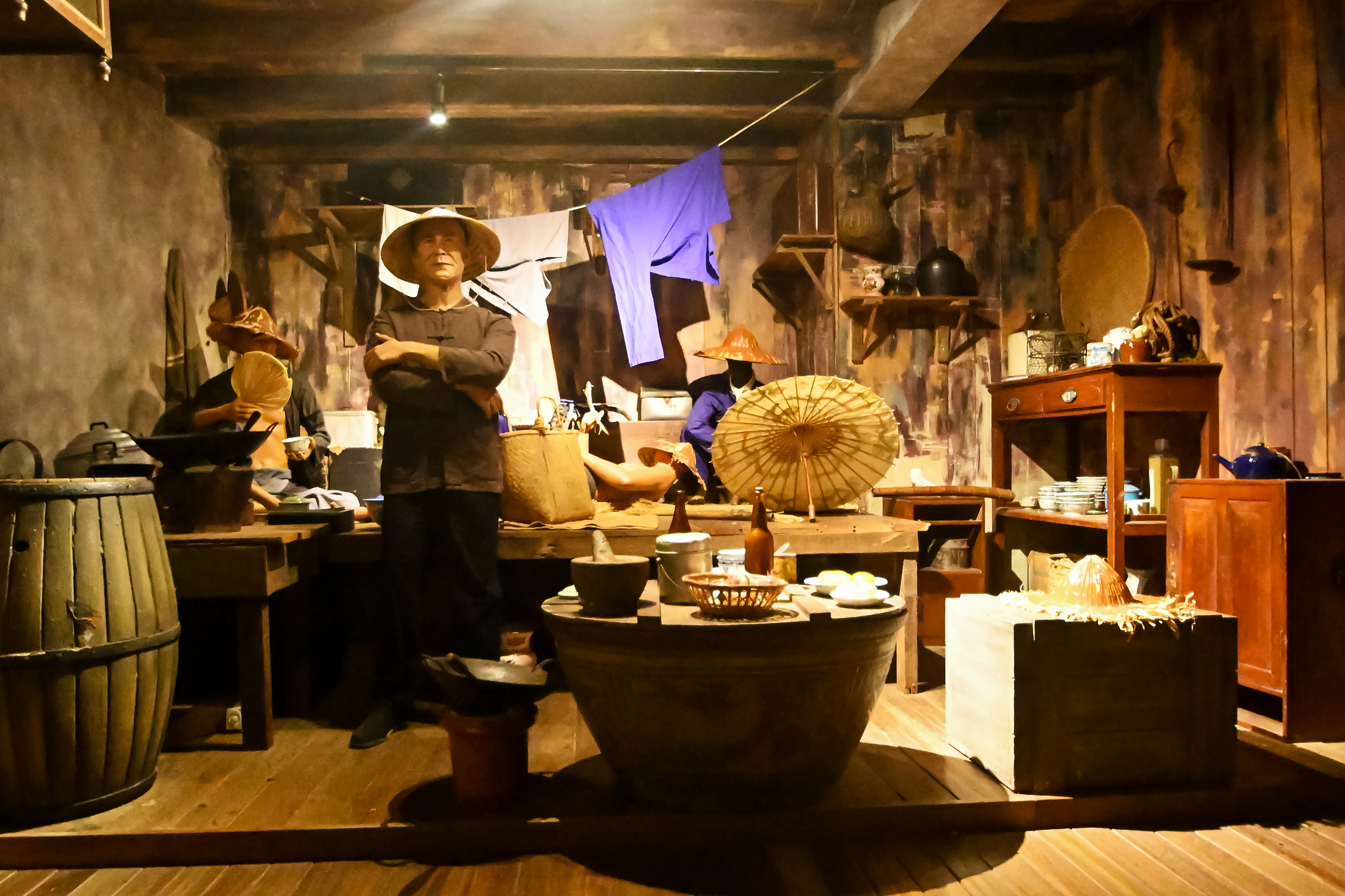
Images of Singapore Gallery

Madame Tussauds Singapore is a wax museum and tourist attraction at the Imbiah Lookout of Sentosa Island in Singapore. It officially opened on 25 October 2014 as the seventh Asian branch of the Madame Tussauds chain of wax attractions worldwide.

== Wax figures ==
The wax attraction features many wax figures of notable political icons, famous superstars, sports icons and others, including Yusof Ishak, Sukarno, Lee Kuan Yew, David Beckham, Sharukh Khan, Johnny Depp and Lady Gaga. In 2015, a figure of the Singapore Girl, an iconic flight attendant for Singapore Airlines, was added. The figure was modelled after flight attendant Nur Surya Binte, and is the second figure to be made of the icon. A year later, the wax figure of Indian Prime Minister Narendra Modi was also added.

=== Featured personalities ===
World Leaders

- Mao Zedong
- Nelson Mandela
- Yusof Ishak
- Mahatma Gandhi
- Sukarno
- Lee Kuan Yew and wife Kwa Geok Choo
- Barack Obama and wife Michelle Obama
- Aung San Suu Kyi
- Queen Elizabeth II
- Goh Chok Tong
- Lee Hsien Loong
- Narendra Modi
- Xi Jinping and First Lady Peng Liyuan
- Joko Widodo

Sports

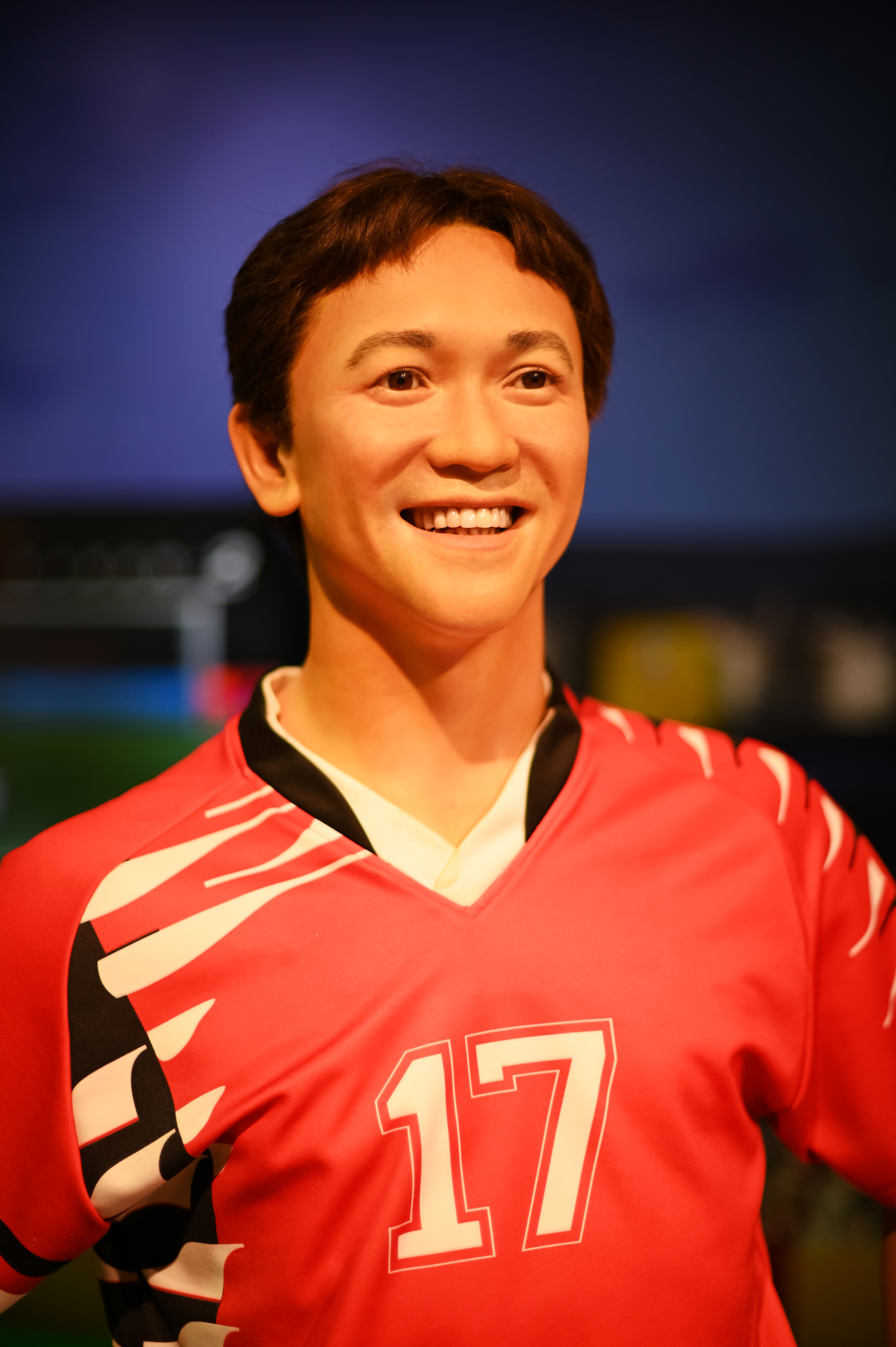
Singaporean footballer Fandi Ahmad

- Cristiano Ronaldo
- Sachin Tendulkar
- David Beckham
- Fandi Ahmad
- Feng Tianwei
- Lewis Hamilton
- Muhammad Ali
- Rafael Nadal
- Rudy Hartono
- Sebastian Vettel
- Serena Williams
- Tiger Woods
- Yao Ming
- Lee Chong Wei
- Virat Kohli
- Yip Pin Xiu

TV and Film

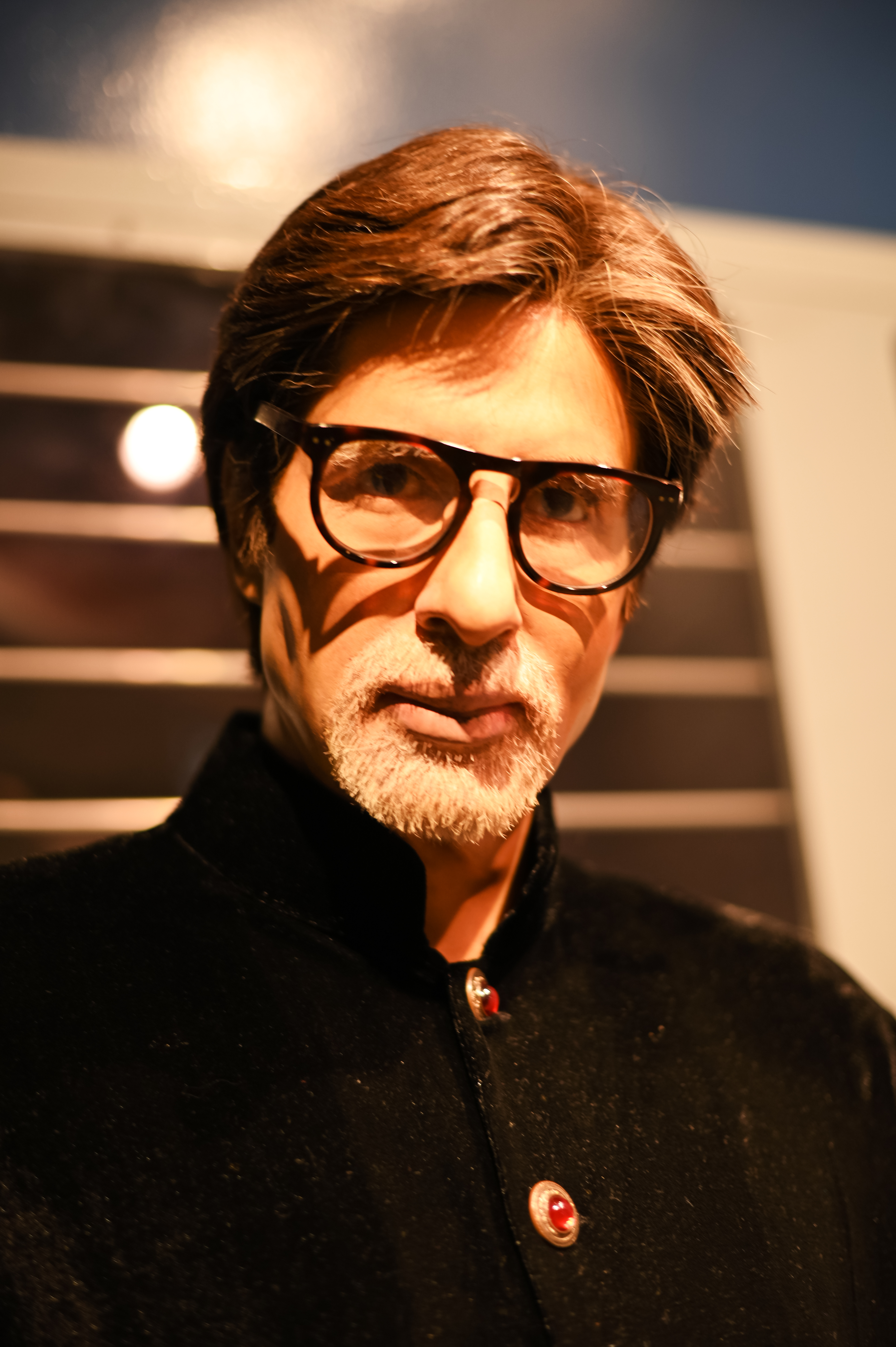
Amitabh Bachchan

- Daniel Craig as James Bond
- Tom Cruise
- Marilyn Monroe
- Arnold Schwarzenegger as Terminator
- Vin Diesel
- Audrey Hepburn
- Steven Spielberg
- Oprah Winfrey
- Bruce Lee
- Jackie Chan
- Jack Neo
- Cecilia Cheung
- Leon Lai
- Jet Li
- Donnie Yen
- Gurmit Singh as Phua Chu Kang
- E.T.
- Mahesh Babu
- Kajal Aggarwal
- Catriona Gray
- Prabhas as Baahubali
- Pia Wurtzbach

A-list

- Johnny Depp
- Leonardo DiCaprio
- Andy Lau
- Benedict Cumberbatch
- Kate Winslet
- Fan Bingbing
- Michelle Yeoh
- Huang Wenyong
- Zoe Tay
- Will Smith
- Priyanka Chopra
- Nicole Kidman
- Liam Hemsworth
- Ryan Gosling
- Dwayne Johnson

Ultimate Film Star Experience

- Kajal Aggarwal as Indian actress
- Karan Johar
- Shahid Kapoor
- Sridevi
- Varun Dhawan
- Deepika Padukone
- Ranveer Singh
- Ranbir Kapoor
- Prabhas as Indian actor

IIFA Award Experience

- Shah Rukh Khan
- Amitabh Bachchan
- Mahesh Babu as Indian actor
- Madhuri Dixit
- Hrithik Roshan
- Aishwarya Rai
- Anushka Sharma
- Kajol
- Kareena Kapoor

Music

- Elvis Presley
- Michael Jackson
- Beyoncé
- Madonna
- Lady Gaga
- Harry Styles
- Katy Perry
- Taylor Swift
- Shawn Mendes
- Ariana Grande
- Ed Sheeran
- Dua Lipa
- Jay Chou
- Teresa Teng
- Joey Yung
- Dick Lee
- Stefanie Sun
- JJ Lin
- Agnez Mo
- Lea Salonga
- Lay Zhang
- Justin Bieber
- Joker Xue

K-Wave

- Kim Woo-bin
- Bae Suzy
- Song Seung-heon
- Hyun Bin
- Lee Min-ho
- Park Hae-jin

Marvel 4D Experience

- Spider-Man
- Iron Man
- Captain America
- Captain Marvel
- Black Panther
- Doctor Strange
- Thor

== See also ==
- List of tourist attractions in Singapore
- Universal Studios Singapore
