= Madame Tussauds Hollywood =

Wax museum/tourist attraction in Hollywood, California

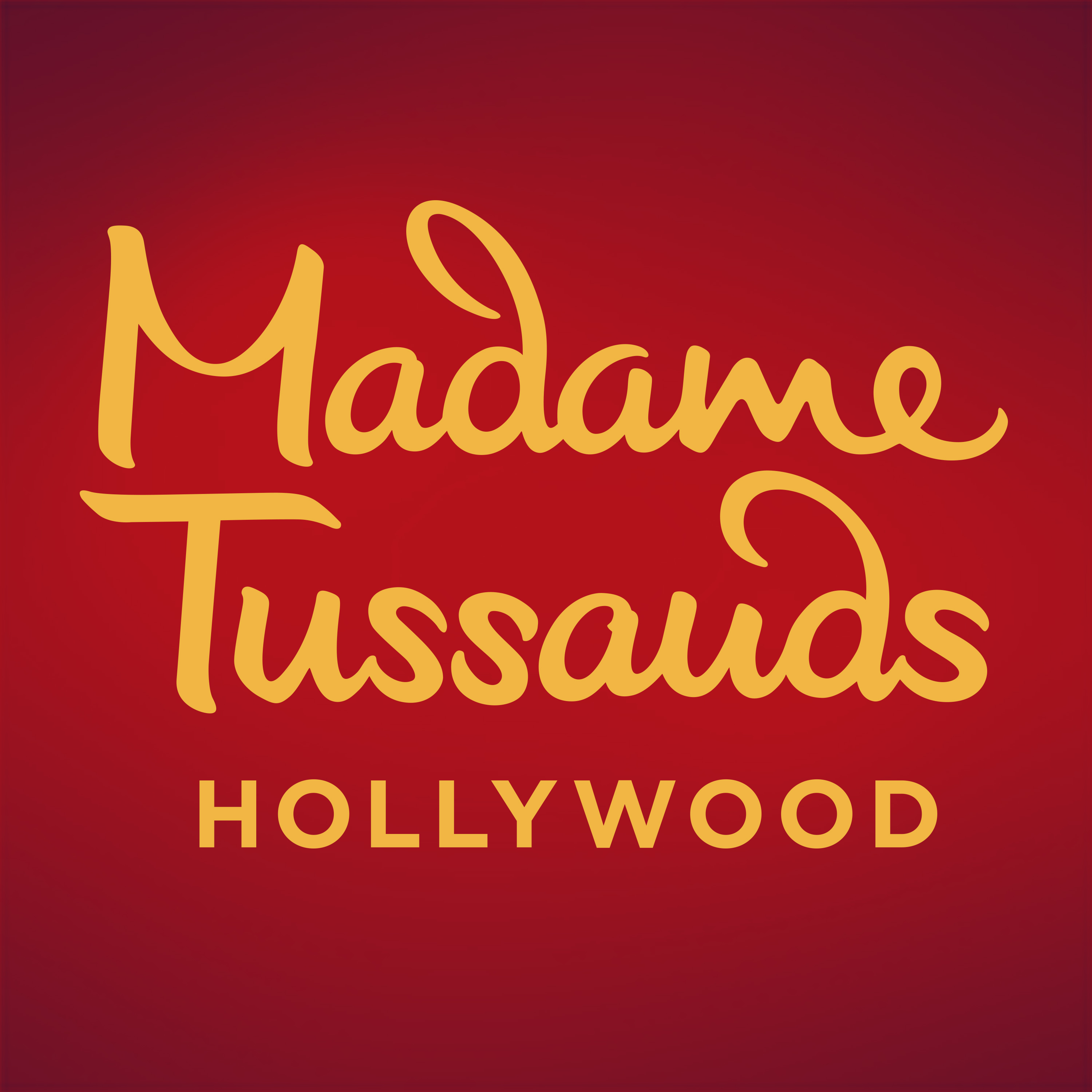

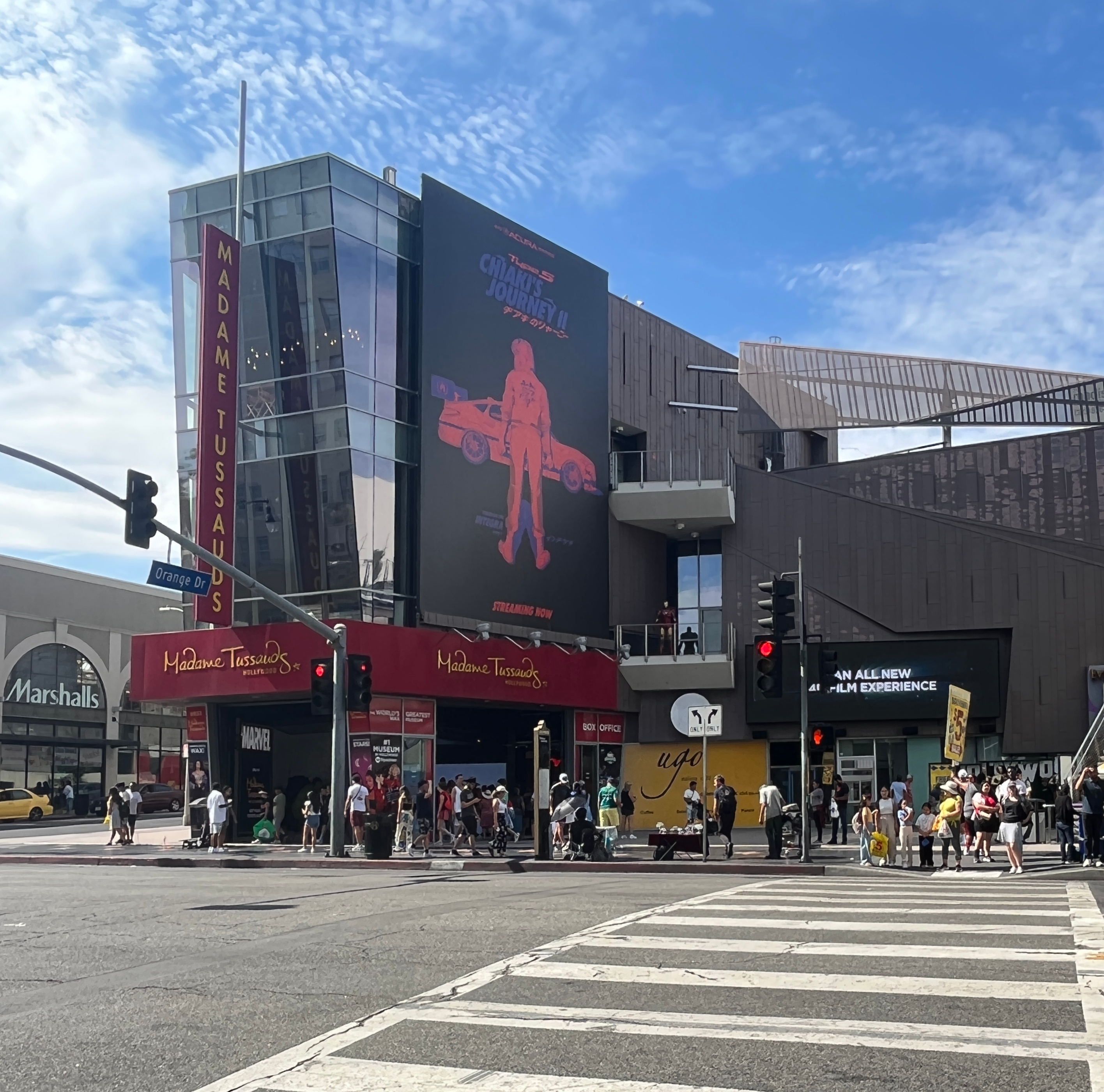

Ride statistics
- Attraction type: Wax Museum

Madame Tussauds Hollywood is a wax museum and tourist attraction located on Hollywood Boulevard in Hollywood, California. It is the ninth location for the Tussauds franchise, which was set up by sculptor Marie Tussaud, and is located just west of the TCL Chinese Theatre (formerly Grauman's). Madame Tussauds is owned and operated by Merlin Entertainments.

== History ==
The three-story museum was under construction for 1.5 years before finally opening in 2009. It features 125 wax figures of famous celebrities - the first ones made for the location were of singer Beyoncé and actor Jamie Foxx, at a cost of approximately $350,000 (USD) each. Each wax figure has its own placard placed on a wall in close physical proximity to it, containing information about the portrayed figure. A few matching props have been placed near select figures for visitors to use while taking photos.

The biggest figure in the museum is King Kong. The figure sits on the second floor of the attraction.

Marilyn Monroe, Dwayne Johnson, Kobe Bryant, and Hulk are among the figures used in the lobby to entice guests to enter the attraction.

== Current figures ==
- Danny Trejo
- Kylie Jenner
- Morgan Freeman
- Selena Gomez
- Lady Gaga
- Ariana Grande
- Justin Bieber
- Madonna
- Viola Davis
- Jason Derulo
- Lorde
- Ryan Reynolds
- Jimmy Kimmel
- Leonardo DiCaprio
- Angelina Jolie
- Zoe Saldaña
- Jennifer Lopez
- Conan O'Brien
- Simon Cowell
- George Lopez
- Angela Bassett
- Penelope Cruz
- Meryl Streep
- Johnny Depp
- Julia Roberts
- Brad Pitt
- Ryan Gosling
- Marlene Dietrich
- E.T.
- Jim Carrey
- Jack Nicholson
- Alfred Hitchcock
- Audrey Hepburn
- Clark Gable
- Judy Garland
- Bette Davis
- Jimmy Fallon
- Bob Hope
- Bruce Lee
- Charlie Chaplin
- Johnny Grant
- Charlton Heston
- Elvis Presley
- Elizabeth Taylor
- Katharine Hepburn
- George Burns
- Gloria Swanson
- Howard Hughes
- Humphrey Bogart
- Ingrid Bergman
- James Dean
- James Stewart
- Joan Rivers
- Marilyn Monroe
- Fred Astaire
- Ginger Rogers
- Peter O'Toole
- Raquel Welch
- Vivien Leigh
- Antonio Banderas
- John Wayne
- Paul Newman
- Robert Redford
- Clint Eastwood
- Anthony Hopkins
- Bela Lugosi
- Boris Karloff
- Al Pacino
- Dustin Hoffman
- John Travolta
- Edward Scissorhands
- Tom Hanks
- William Shatner
- Patrick Stewart
- Whoopi Goldberg
- Patrick Swayze
- Sylvester Stallone
- Pierce Brosnan
- Daniel Craig
- Bruce Willis
- Robert De Niro
- Denzel Washington
- Jackie Chan
- Jennifer Lawrence
- Arnold Schwarzenegger
- Martin Scorsese
- Marlon Brando
- Quentin Tarantino
- Steven Spielberg
- Will Smith
- Uma Thurman
- Zac Efron
- Harry Styles
- Rihanna
- Beyoncé
- Shakira
- Demi Lovato
- Lil Nas X
- Bad Bunny
- Elton John
- Shawn Mendes
- Justin Timberlake
- Taylor Swift
- Snoop Dogg
- Michael Jackson
- Selena Quintanilla
- Spider-Man
- Chris Hemsworth
- Chris Evans
- Brie Larson
- Letitia Wright
- Samuel L. Jackson
- Robert Downey Jr.
- Iron Man
- Jake Sully
- Marie Tussaud
