= Madame Tussauds Las Vegas =

Wax museum located in the Las Vegas Strip

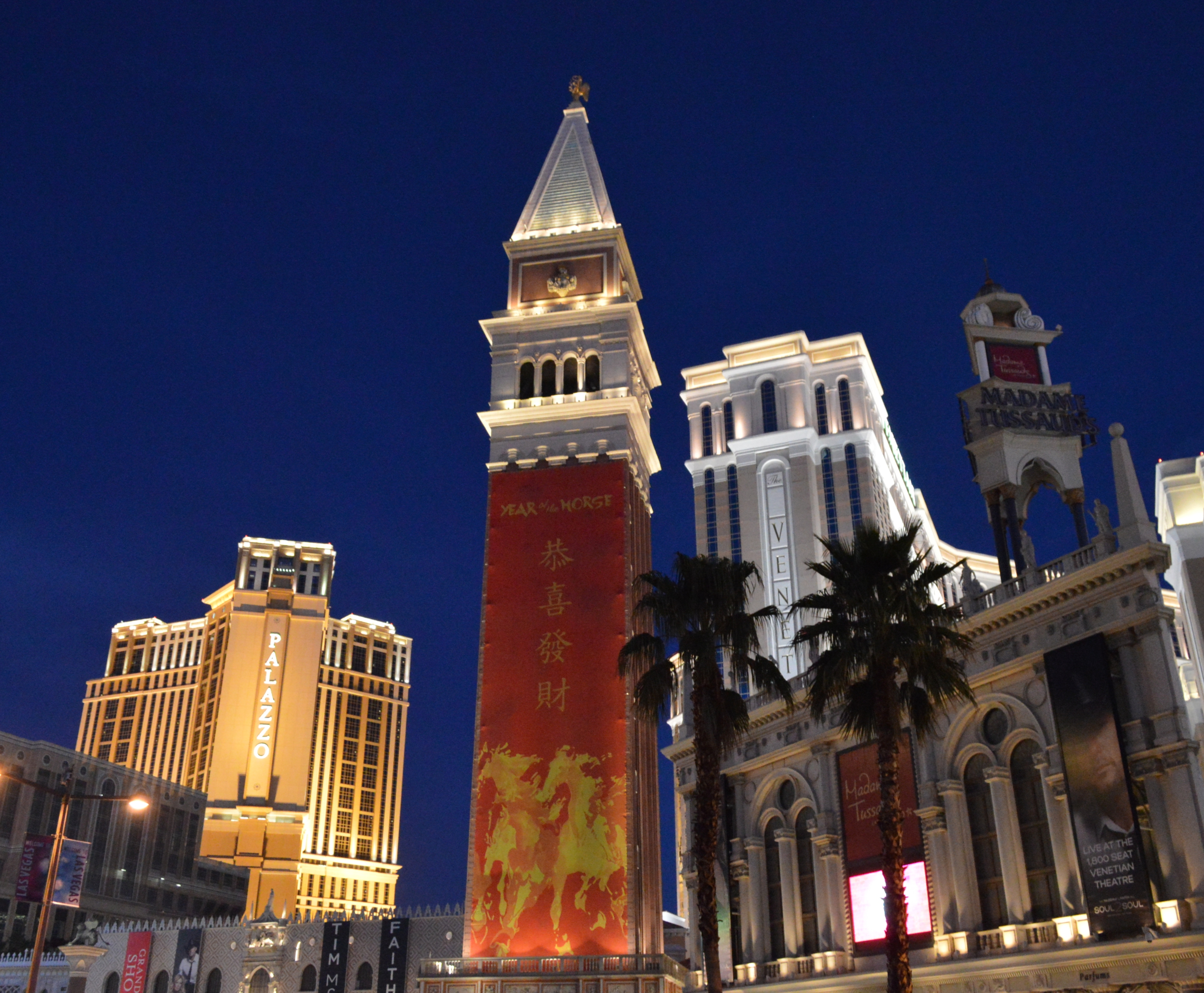

Paradise, Nevada
- Status: Operating
- Opening date: 1999

Ride statistics
- Attraction type: Wax museum
- Website: http://www.madametussauds.com/lasvegas

Madame Tussauds Las Vegas is a wax museum located in the Las Vegas Strip at The Venetian Las Vegas casino resort in Paradise, Nevada. The attraction opened in 1999, becoming the first Madame Tussauds venue to open in the United States. It features over 100 wax figures of famous celebrities, film and TV characters, athletes, musicians and Marvel superheroes, as well a 4D movie theatre. Subsequent Madame Tussauds venues opened in the U.S. in New York City in 2000, Washington D.C. in 2007, and Hollywood, California in 2009.

== Wax making process ==
The process of making a wax figure can take anywhere from four to six months. After a survey has been conducted on who the attraction should include, researchers find out as much information as possible about the chosen celebrities including their hairstyle, common facial expressions, and clothing preferences. If they are able, celebrities visit the Madame Tussauds stylists who take more than 150 measurements and 200 photos, and use an oil-based paint to create a realistic skin complexion. The figure is not made entirely of wax, but also uses clay and steel. Some celebrities have been directly involved in their figure's creation. Gwen Stefani teamed up with the Madame Tussauds Las Vegas in-house team to achieve the style of her wax figure, while Fergie from the Black Eyed Peas donated one of her dresses to the museum.

== Notable figures ==
TV Stars	Hollywood Stars	Music Stars	Athletes	Viva Las Vegas	Marvel
Sofia Vergara	Sandra Bullock	Britney Spears (performs at Planet Hollywood resort)	Muhammad Ali (faced Leon Spinks at the Hilton Hotel in Vegas in '78)	Elvis Presley	Captain America
Simon Cowell	Leonardo DiCaprio	Whitney Houston	Chuck Liddell (UFC Light Heavyweight Champion)	Marilyn Monroe	Spider-Man
Eva Longoria (opened Beso restaurant in Vegas)	Halle Berry	Beyoncé	Tiger Woods	RuPaul	Nick Fury
Kathy Griffin (does stand up in Vegas)	Jodie Foster	Michael Jackson (owned a home in Vegas)	Shaquille O'Neal	Blue Man Group	Hulk
Jennifer Lopez	Robert Pattinson	Aaliyah	Kobe Bryant	Frank Sinatra	
Kendall Jenner	Christian Bale	Christina Aguilera	Dale Earnhardt	Gwen Stefani	
Siegfried & Roy (show at The Mirage)	Tom Cruise	Megan Thee Stallion	Ayrton Senna	Prince	
Kim Kardashian	Benedict Cumberbatch	Taylor Swift	Wayne Gretzky	Celine Dion (performs at Caesars Palace resort)	
Criss Angel (show at Planet Hollywood hotel)	Anne Hathaway	Katy Perry (performs at Resorts World)	Lance Armstrong	Lizzo	
Tiffany Haddish	Scarlett Johansson	Shakira	Jeff Gordon	Missy Elliott	
Kourtney Kardashian	Cameron Diaz	Miley Cyrus	Babe Ruth	Dean Martin	
	Johnny Depp	Post Malone	Mike Tyson	Sammy Davis Jr.	
	Jamie Foxx	Ricky Martin	Don King	Louis Armstrong	
	Mel Gibson	Lady Gaga	Dale Earnhardt Jr.	Robert De Niro	
	Jennifer Aniston	Justin Bieber	Andre Agassi	Bob Marley	
	Brad Pitt	Bad Bunny	Arnold Palmer	Stevie Wonder	
	Whoopi Goldberg	Jack Harlow	Richard Petty	Jerry Garcia	
	George Clooney	Nicki Minaj		Wayne Newton	
	Salma Hayek	Drake			
	Vin Diesel	Tupac Shakur			
	Bradley Cooper	Fergie			
	Eddie Murphy	Travis Barker			
	Dwayne Johnson	Snoop Dogg			
		Steve Aoki			
		J Balvin			
		Janis Joplin			
		Jimi Hendrix			
		Demi Lovato			
		Karol G			
		Rihanna			
		Harry Styles			
