= Madame Tussauds Washington D.C. =

Wax museum in Washington, 2007 to 2020

Coordinates: 38°53′51″N 77°1′34″W

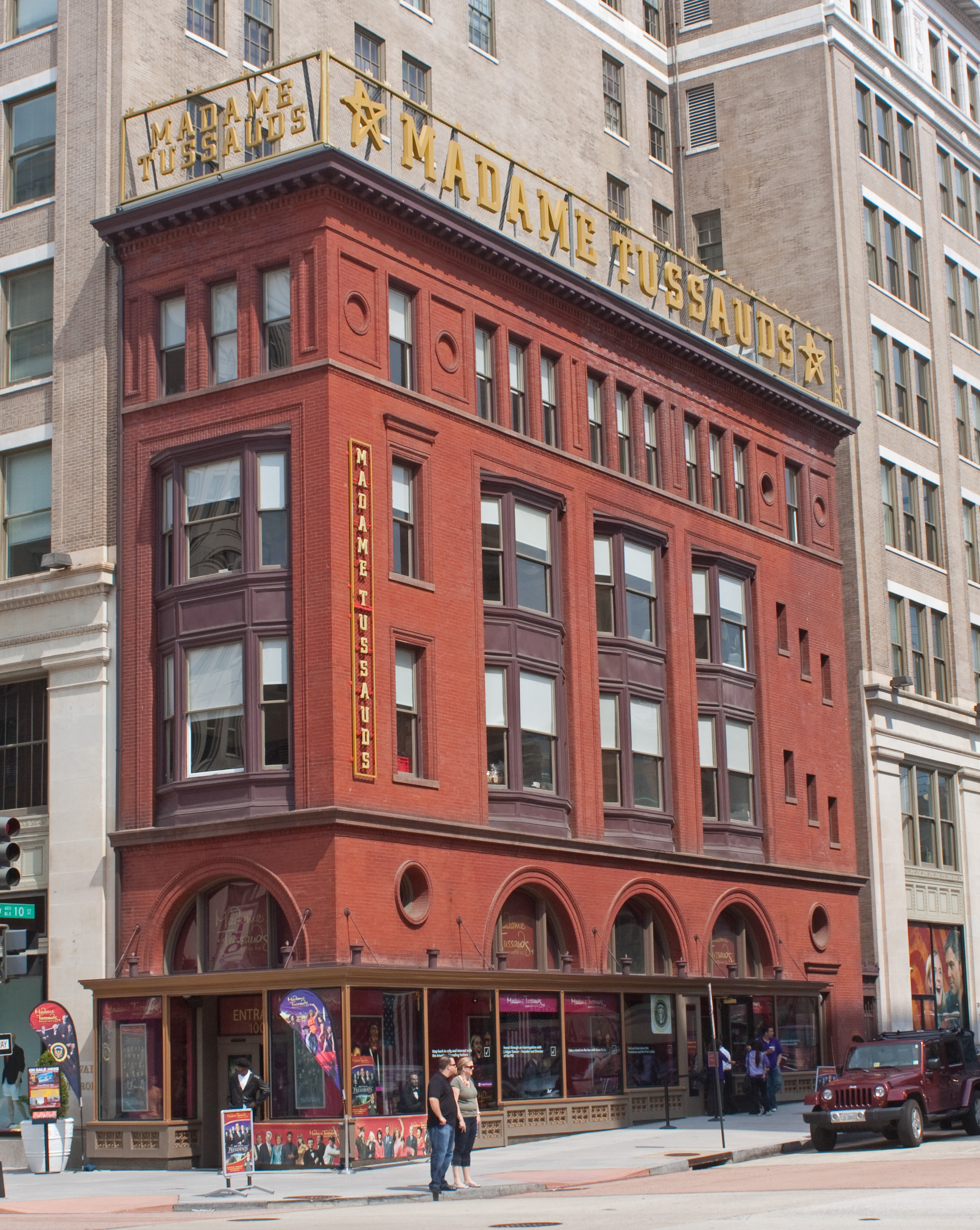

Penn Quarter
- Area: 1001 F St NW, Washington, DC 20004
- Status: Closed
- Opening date: 2007
- Closing date: March 2020

Ride statistics
- Attraction type: Wax museum

Madame Tussauds Washington D.C. was a wax museum located in Washington D.C.. The attraction opened in October 2007 and became the 12th Madame Tussauds venue worldwide, and featured wax sculptures of famous figures from politics, culture, sports, music and television. In comparison to other Madame Tussauds venues, the venue features more waxworks of political figures, with sculptures of all 45 U.S. presidents displayed.

The wax museum was a block away from Ford's Theatre. It was the first wax museum in Washington D.C. in 25 years, following the closure of the wax museum on Fourth and E streets in 1982.

The museum closed after March 17, 2020, because of the COVID-19 pandemic. The closure was announced as temporary, but the museum never reopened. In July 2021, the museum operator was seeking to sublease the entire space of the former museum to outside parties.

== Themed rooms ==
The museum contained several themed rooms where visitors were allowed and encouraged to look at, touch and take photographs next to popular public figures:

- Presidents Gallery – contained wax models of all 45 U.S Presidents since the time of George Washington.
- Civil Rights Room – dedicated to those who fought for African-American freedom in the country, such as Martin Luther King Jr. and Rosa Parks
- Glamour Room – set in a nightclub scene, features A-list celebrities such as Michael Jackson, George Clooney, Johnny Depp, Angelina Jolie, and Beyoncé.
- Media Room – set in a television studio, features TV personalities and talk-show hosts like Oprah Winfrey, Larry King, Tyra Banks and Stephen Colbert
- Sports Gallery – featured stars from several sports including NBA, hockey, boxing, baseball, golf and more. Notable figures included Tiger Woods, Babe Ruth and Evander Holyfield.
- Behind the Scenes – featured an interactive gallery created to educate visitors about the background and history of Madame Tussauds and how wax figures are made.
