= Klementyna Mańkowska =

Member of the Polish resistance during WW II

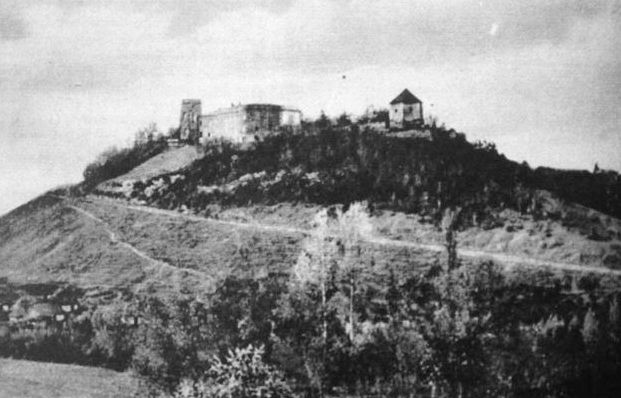
- The family estate at Wysuczka where Klementyna Mankowska grew up. The castle was destroyed and the building stones recycled after 1945.
- Born: Klementyna Czarkowska-Golejewska; 1 August 1910; Wysuczka, Galicia, Austro-Hungary (in Western Ukraine since 1945)
- Died: 4 January 2003 (aged 92); Nevers, Bourgogne-Franche-Comté, France
- Occupations: socialite resistance activist spy writer
- Spouse: Andrzej Mańkowski (1910–2001)
- Children: 1. Krzysztof; 2. Andrzej (1936-1972); 3. Maria
- Parent(s): Cyryl Czarkowski-Golejewski (1885–1940); Izabela Jaxa-Małachowska (1885–1958)

Klementyna Mańkowska (born Klementyna Czarkowska-Golejewska on 1 August 1910; died 4 January 2003 in the Château Sermoise, Nevers) was a Polish aristocrat, who was a member of the Polish resistance and agent of Polish and British intelligence services during World War II.

== Life ==
=== Provenance and early years ===
Klementyna Maria Czarkowska-Golejewska was born into a local land owning family in Wysuczka, a small settlement between Lviv and Ternopil in Galicia. This is where she grew up on her father's family estate, which she later described as "a paradise". Since 1945 the region has been part of Western Ukraine, but at the time of her birth it was part of the Austro-Hungarian empire. During the interwar period it was part of Poland which had been restored to independence after the First World War. Klementyna was the second daughter of Cyryl Czarkowski-Golejewski (1885–1940) by his marriage to Izabela Jaxa-Małachowska (1885–1958). She herself married at the start of 1933. She and her husband were both 23 when they married, and her husband, Count Andrzej Mańkowski (1910–2001) was still completing his university studies of law and economics at the nearby university. For Klementyna the marriage meant moving away from her own family, to live in the western part of Poland. Andrzej was content to entrust the management of the Mańkowski family estate at Winna Góra near Poznań to his young wife. By 1939 they were living there with their two sons. The family were well connected both in Poland and internationally. Andrzej Mańkowski had attended the international Benedictine school at Bruges in Belgium between 1922 and 1928, and the staff on the family estate included a German nanny called Teta who took care of the boys.

=== War ===
Early in September 1939 war arrived from the west and, sixteen days later, from the east. An early taste of war came to Winna Góra later that month when Lieutenant Andrzej Mańkowski (as her husband had by now become) was seriously shot and for the time being immobilised by his own subordinates because he had angrily upbraided a group of Polish soldiers for mistreating a captured German officer in ways that would have offended his own conscience and breached the Geneva Conventions. The German prisoner had been stabbed in the eye with a bayonet. At this stage they were playing host to two "old school" German officers who had arrived on a couple of motor bikes six days after the launch of the German invasion, and who were surprised to find Klementyna Mańkowska and her children ensconced in the castle. Others, elsewhere in the area, had already fled. Beyond the estate, the village was deserted. The officers assured the Mańkowskis they would need only one of the three floors of the castle, modestly furnished. There are powerful indications of a brief but intense romance involving one of them. A month later the Gestapo arrived and the family were thrown out of their home at Winna Góra. The castle had been selected as a present/trophy for Field Marshal Wilhelm Keitel.

Arriving as a refugee family at the elegant Warsaw apartment of her friend, the ballerina Olga Sławska, Mańkowska felt shame "for the second time since the outbreak of the war":

- "Filthy and smelly, we were scared to walk on the gleaming rugs or to sit in the Louis XV-style chairs. I have never experienced such a feeling of awkwardness and embarrassment."
- "Brudni i śmierdzący po podróży baliśmy się chodzić po jasnych dywanach, baliśmy się siadać na fotelach w stylu Ludwika XV. Jeszcze nigdy nie doznałam podobnego uczucia obcości, zawstydzenia i skrępowania."
Klementyna Mańkowska, quoted in 2013 by Marek Igły

One of the German officers, Harold von Hoepfner, proposed a joint trip to Italy in order to protect Klementyna. However, her husband had been badly injured when shot by a Polish soldier under his command, and was still critically ill, by now in a hospital somewhere near Kutno. She turned down von Hoepfner's invitation: "I do not think the Wehrmacht officer would want me to give up, for him, a man who stood up heroically in defence of the German soldier". (Note: " Chyba oficer Wehrmachtu nie chciałby, żebym porzuciła dla niego człowieka, który tak bohatersko stanął w obronie niemieckiego żołnierza.") Klementyna had resolved to stay with Andrzej, but there was no longer any place for them in their home, so they moved with their children to Warsaw where they stayed with the ballerina Olga Sławska, a family friend. In early October 1939, the Germans captured Warsaw and the Mańkowskis moved on to stay with a cousin, Teresa Łubieńska whose spacious apartment home at "ulicy 6 sierpnia" ("6 Sierpnia Street") in the city centre, close to Zbawiciela Square, had become a refuge for well-connected Poles dispossessed by the war. It pulsated with social gatherings. But it quickly became clear that the men who arrived at Cousin Teresa's apartment several evenings each week were not simply party goers. They were members of a newly formed anti-Nazi grouping known as the "Muszkieterowie" ("Musketeers"), identified variously as a "resistance group" ("Widerstandsgruppe ") or as an "intelligence organisation" ("Nachrichtendienstorganisation").

The "Muszkieterowie" recruited mainly from the Polish nobility. Klementyna Mańkowska joined. She was a talented linguist and her activities were focused on "courier services": she smuggled documents, microfilms and messages concealed in rolls of toilet paper to France and Britain. However, that was very far from the full extent of her involvement. The "Muszkieterowie" were led by Stefan Witkowski an engineer-entrepreneur believed to have had long-standing connections with British intelligence. Details of his contacts are uncertain and remain, eighty years later, controversial: they were conducted independently of the (till June 1940 Paris based) Polish government in exile, and British public archives covering the relationship remain firmly closed to researchers. Witkowski very soon recognised Mańkowska's potential and put her in touch with resistance activists Aleksander Wielkopolski and Karol Anders. After this she was included in discussions on the importance of surveillance and of setting up an espionage network. One incident, in particular, convinced Wielkopolski of Mańkowska's talent for espionage. The high-ranking German officer Harold von Hoepfner, returning from Milan, turned up unexpectedly in Warsaw to see Klementyna Mańkowska. He arrived, en route to Berlin, with flowers, wine, and cheesecake. Listening from an adjacent broom cupboard, Witkowski and Wielkopolski were amazed to hear the brazen combination of grace and charm that Mańkowska applied to extracting information from her German friend about an end to the "Sitzkrieg" in the west, and the forthcoming German invasion of France. (They may or may not have been aware already that von Hoepfner and Mańkowska had almost certainly, briefly, been lovers during the early weeks of the war.) The German officer's information had been precise in respect of dates, though he seems to have kept to himself any knowledge he might have had about strategic detailed planning for the invasion. Witkowski nevertheless took the decision to hand over the information he had on the German plans for the invasion of France to British intelligence.

Witkowski now embarked on a perilous and lengthy tour of western Europe, using the fake identity of a high-ranking SS-officer called August von Thierbach. His project was nothing less than the creation of an espionage network across Europe. He sent Klementyna Mańkowska to Brittany in north-western France. Her mandate was to take charge of communications in the event that the French government should be obliged to escape abroad - presumably to or via Britain. Andrzej and Klementyna Mańkowski, like many members of the Polish aristocracy at the time, were both completely fluent in French. Andrzej Mańkowski joined the Polish expatriate division in Marseille while the couple's two sons were placed in the care of Mańkowska's mother, at this stage still in eastern Poland.

=== Noirmoutier ===
The Germans quickly overran northern France and Mańkowska found a job as a translator-interpreter with the mayor, under the new administration, at the prefecture on the strategically important Island of Noirmoutier off the Atlantic coast. She did nothing to conceal her Polish provenance, nor, indeed, that she was a Countess. The German's were impressed by her easy fluency in French and German, and by her commitment and diligence. Despite her gender, beauty and aristocratic bearing, she was very happy to travel to military bases in order to provide translation services. The Germans were unaware of the extent to which she remembered what she saw. She accompanied the German regional governor, Karl Maier, on a visit to Saint-Nazaire because there were "lots of French" there. She accompanied him into a large covered hangar containing two of the latest Type VII submarines. Later she had time to sit and wait in the car: using the backs table-napkins Mańkowska was able to sketch plans of the interior configurations and staircases of the submarines as well as the external doors. She was interrupted when Maier stuck his head through the car window to ask her "what is this fellow on about?". The fellow, a small Frenchman with a mustache, was venting his rage because his time off to be with his wife for the birth of their child had been cancelled. Maier puffed out his already puffy face and rolled his eyes deep into his skull. "This is war, boy", he sighed. There are reports that notes provided by Mańkowska ware later critical to the planning of a major allied raid on the Saint-Nazaire submarine base.

After she rescued two senior German colonels from a recalcitrant waiter at Noirmoutier's best restaurant, Klementyna Mańkowska was provided with a helpful testimonial, which carried the seal of the German High Command:

- "Mrs. Klementyna, Countess Mańkowska, has turned out to be completely pro-German. ... She is honest and trustworthy. All civilian and military institutions are asked to give her advice and assistance."

After a few months Klementyna Mańkowska applied to her German employers for permission to take a break, back in occupied Poland. She was keen to meet up with "Muszkieterowie" comrades. While she was awaiting a response to her application she spotted a large German car on Noirmoutier. Noirmoutier was then as now, for many purposes, something of a backwater, and the presence of two important German officers in the island's best restaurant, with their staff car waiting outside, was noteworthy. Through the window of the restaurant, she could see two German colonels were using very broken French to try and order their meal from a waiter, who was successfully understanding nothing. She entered and offered her services as translator. The officers were delighted by the timely if unexpected appearance of this helpful and beautiful Polish countess, who was able quickly to smooth out any misunderstandings with the waiter. They invited her to join them. As they ate, drank and chatted, Mańkowska worked her charms: she learned from her dinner companions that they were part of the German High Command. The officers also found out some things about the countess. She told them she was terrified of the end of the war, because she had no idea who would be around to look after her. A few letters of commendation from field commanders would be of limited usefulness. The men were sympathetic. Then one of them had an idea. He said he would issue her with a document, bearing the seal of the German High Command, attesting to her pro-German credentials and requesting "all military and civilian institutions to provide her with advice and assistance". Mańkowska gratefully accepted the offer. A genuine seal of the German High Command would be particularly useful to the "Muszkieterowie". It helped Stefan Witkowski create high quality fake seals of his own which he used for his clandestine missions in different parts of Europe.

Mańkowska's leave was authorized soon afterward. By the time she arrived in Warsaw she was convinced that she had been tracked during the train journey. A German staff officer sat down next to her and asked what she was reading. He seemed unable to get over the fact that she was traveling in a first class carriage normally reserved for German military personnel. (Travel arrangements had been made by helpful field commanders in Noirmoutier.) Eventually her travelling companion stood up, bowed, and explained that he had to leave the train, "but we will definitely see each other again". In Poland she met up with Witkowski and told him about her travelling companion. "Not Gestapo, they never promise anything. Might be a coincidence, one more German officer who spotted your 100% Aryan beauty", was Witkowski's assessment. She told him where she had been and what she had been doing. She was able to hand over various details and plans on the rapidly growing Saint-Nazaire naval base. Witkowski was particularly thrilled when she handed over the seal of the German High Command. A week after she got back to western France she was arrested and taken to the Gestapo detention centre in Nantes where she was held overnight. Everyone was scrupulously polite: the arresting officer was merely following orders. He had no idea why Mańkowska was being arrested. Mańkowska behaved like a countess, insisting on packing in a small suitcase her night gown, her bathrobe, four pink jars of Elizabeth Arden cosmetics and a napkin to cover the table in the cell to which, presumably, she was about to be driven. On reaching the cell she asked the guard for an extra blanket and a sheet. This was not usual behaviour for people arrested by the Gestapo, but unwilling to risk inadvertently upsetting someone higher in the hierarchy, the confused guard obliged.

After her night in the cell at Nantes she was transported to Paris where a dungeon awaited her. Almost immediately she met Sturmbannführer Karl Schwerbel, the head of the Gestapo office in Paris for Polish affairs and people. It turned out that she was not, as she had anticipated, about to be interrogated about her "Muszkieterowie" activities and then shot. The matter was more mundane: well-intentioned German officers on the ground in Noirmoutier had concealed Mańkowska's Polish nationality when referring to her in their reports. Their wish to avoid causing trouble for her had had the opposite result. Nevertheless, she had no difficulty in convincing Schwerbel that she had been unaware of the subterfuge, and he unhesitatingly declared her innocent. Despite her complaints about the cost in time and money involved in arresting and detaining her and then sending her by car to Paris, he now expended more of the Gestapo budget in order to send her back in a first-class train compartment to the west of France and her base on the Island of Noirmoutier.

The picture postcard that Mańkowska received in Noirmoutier may not have come as a total surprise. The picture was of a seaside scene. The sender had written his message on the back:

"You may not remember our meeting, but I fell in love at first sight. I expressed surprise that you travelled in a carriage reserved for German soldiers. I said then that we would meet again because I was counting on it. I am still counting.
Doctor Alexander. PS Heil Hitler"

Doctor Alexander's visit to Noirmoutier was, formally, a purely social affair. He emerged from his car wearing the same staff officer uniform and badges he had been wearing on that train. During dinner he talked about himself. He liked to call himself "Doctor": his full name was Wallraf Hans Alexander. He talked with passion of his time as a soldier during the Great War and about the old days under the Kaiser. He mentioned that he had placed "Heil Hitler" on his post card only for the benefit of the censors, which tended to confirm Mańkowską's suspicion that his current employer might be some kind of intelligence agency. He was, perhaps, working for the British.

=== Berlin ===
Meanwhile, German intelligence, convinced of Klementyna Mańkowska's pro-German sentiments, selected her as a potential agent. In June 1941 she started a new job, based in Berlin and working at the Foreign Ministry. It was the first stage in her training. While she was in Berlin she remembered a card that had been delivered for her attention a few months earlier care of her coursin Teresa Łubieńska. Harold von Hoepfner was still alive and he was in town. At dinner, with the same casual boasting that he had employed to give her advance notice of the French invasion in May 1940, he openly talked of his imminent posting as part of the vast army that would shortly be invading the Soviet Union. Mańkowska had been welcomed into the Hoepfner family's Berlin apartment as a longstanding family friend. It was important, von Hoepfner, pointed out, that the invasion of Russia should be launched soon so that they did not get caught out by the Russian winter like Napoleon. Later the name of Rudolf "Dolf" von Scheliha came up in conversation. Von Scheliha had worked as a German diplomat in the Warsaw embassy between 1932 and 1939. He had regularly participated in hunting parties at aristocratic estates in the vast Polish countryside. He was, it turned out, a mutual friend. Mańkowska would love to meet up with him again. Von Hoepfner disappeared to make a few 'phone calls. He returned with good news. Von Scheliha was working for the Foreign Ministry, and just now he was in town. Harold von Hoepfner jotted down a telephone number and handed it over.

Dolf von Scheliha was expecting her call. When they met up she saw a stooped sixty-year-old man. (He was actually in his mid-40s.) He insisted that they should talk to each other exclusively in French, and proposed a walk around Berlin's famous Tiergarten (zoo park).

It had been made clear that for security reasons Mańkowska should not expect to be contacted directly by German intelligence during her internship with the Foreign Ministry. However, the guidelines for it had been planned in advance. During her two-month internship she would be provided with her own desk and she would be permitted to take her own notes. Information about the imminent invasion the Soviet Union - some of the information - would be made available to her. But that was far from being the only topic on which she would become better informed.

Six months before the Wannsee Conference, files were placed on Mańkowska's desk containing detailed plans for the Shoa:

- "I believed that in the hearts of even the very worst of men at least a little can be found that is good, even if it is deeply hidden. .... And suddenly that conviction was undermined. Could people really be so angry?"
- "Wierzyłam, że w sercach najgorszych można znaleźć odrobinę dobra, choćby nawet głęboko ukrytą. [...] I nagle moje przekonania zachwiały się. Są zatem naprawdę ludzie źli?"
Klementyna Mańkowska, quoted in 2013 by Marek Igły

Two days after the internship began three million German soldiers crossed into the Soviet Union on a mission of conquest. (Note: Sources differ as to the number of German forces involved in Operation Barbarossa.) That day Dolf von Scheliha placed several folders market "secret" on Mańkowska's desk in the ministry. They did not concern the invasion. It appears they were preliminary detailed plans for the extermination of Europe's Jews. There were indications of the number of people to be packed into ghettos, the most effective ways of implementing mass-killings, transport planning and of plans to create a "death factory" near Warsaw at Treblinka. Mańkowska saw these planning documents six months before the Wannsee Conference at which the various government departments were presented with them. She herself later stated her belief that she had been the first foreigner to learn that the German government were planning mass-murder on a truly unprecedented scale. Despite the times and events through which she lived, Klementyna Mańkowska always maintained a resolutely positive view of human nature, but as she would write many decades later in her memoirs, faced with the evidence of the Holocaust plans, she was forced to recalibrate her optimism.

It later turned out that von Scheliha had not consulted with German intelligence before passing files about the planning for the Holocaust to Mańkowska. He had his own agenda, and believed – probably correctly – that passing the information to Mańkowska was tantamount to passing the information to Polish and British intelligence. Over the next few months, his continuing careful documentation of National Socialist atrocities in Poland created one of the most comprehensive records of the subject ever compiled. His own efforts to alert foreign governments to what was going on became increasingly intense and were probably effective. Several times he travelled to Switzerland as part of his mission to warn, but he always returned home to Berlin. In the end it became clear that Rudolf von Scheliha had become identified by the authorities as an "anti-Nazi", and had himself been under surveillance by the German authorities for a long time: sources indicate – without providing much detail – that he had been passing information to "Moscow" since the 1930s. He was detained, given a brief trial and on 22 December 1942 executed by guillotine at Berlin's Plötzensee prison.

During her internship with the Foreign Ministry in the middle part of 1941 Klementyna Mańkowska had to take a few days off work and stay home with acute food poisoning. That, at least, is what she told management. She travelled to Warsaw in order to discuss with Stefan Witkowski the rich possibilities that had been opened up through her recruitment by German intelligence. A career as a double agent beckoned. The first visitor she received at Teresa Łubieńska's Warsaw apartment was not Witkowski, however. A short plump Polish civilian knocked on the door while she was taking a cup of tea with her cousin. Uninvited, the new visitor installed himself in an armchair and introduced himself as "Witold". He enquired directly about the well-being of "Stewit" (Witkowski) and his network of "agents scattered all over Europe". He urged Mańkowska not to worry, insisting that he and she were on the same side. "Adolf nicht gut". Mańkowska was unsure what to make of the visitor and his message, the oblique delivery of which suggested that he was on a mission, probably, on behalf of British intelligence. He certainly did not appear to be operating according to the Gestapo rule book, and she could think of no reason why the German intelligence services should bother to follow her all the way to Warsaw just to convey a gratuitously opaque message that they knew she was not staying home with food poisoning.

That evening Witkowski came round. He was very happy that Mańkowska had been recruited by German intelligence but he did not hesitate to let her know how this added to his problems. There was an inherent rivalry between the "Muszkieterowie", with their longstanding direct links to British intelligence and the "Dwójka", till 1939 the Polish Military Intelligence agency, and since the Fall of France in 1940 represented in significant numbers by political exiles living in London alongside members of the Polish government-in-exile. In London, the "Dwójka" struggled jealously for recognition as the only credible Polish anti-Nazi espionage organisation, while Witkowski was convinced that much of the intelligence they picked up through their various connections was less directly sourced and more out of date than information that the "Muszkieterowie" could provide using their own network. Witkowski admitted that Mańkowska's work as a double agent was going to be affected and possibly compromised by the intensifying rivalry between two very differently configured Polish intelligence organisations. "For them, you are an internal enemy, just like me. When is this Alexander fellow going to send you to Great Britain?" (Note: "Jesteś dla nich wrogiem wewnętrznym, tak samo jak ja. Kiedy ten Alexander zamierza wysłać cię do Wielkiej Brytanii?")

For Witkowski, Klementyna Mańkowska's transfer to England as an agent of German intelligence ("Abwehr") would provide a welcome opportunity to establish direct contact with General Sikorski, leader of the Polish government-in-exile in London. But before that could happen she needed to undergo her Abwehr training. Witkowski believed she was at considerable peril as long as she remained in Warsaw where at any time someone associated with the "Dwójka" might decide she was collaborating with the Nazis and carry out a death sentence against her. He urged her to conclude her "food poisoning" incident without delay and return to her desk in Berlin. The meeting with Witkowski may well have been a little rushed and it is impossible to know whether Mańkowska alerted him to the files she had received containing plans for the forthcoming Holocaust. It seems possible she did not. There were at this time many people, including the leaderships of foreign governments, who were unable or unwilling to believe the scale of the Shoa being planned by the German authorities, however persuasive and complete the evidence may have appeared in retrospect to those who only became aware of the atrocities after many of the mass-murders had already been committed. There is speculation that Mańkowska herself may have been among those who found it impossible to take at face value the evidence contained in the files that Dolf von Scheliha had left on her desk at the ministry.

It was anticipated by German intelligence that when she reached London Mańkowska would be able to obtain a position of trust with an appropriate ministry or government agency, and it would then be important to be able to encrypt the contents of stolen documents. Much of her training involved mastery of the necessary encryption techniques and the associated rotating sipher tables. She was taught about important codes, addresses and pseudonyms for German intelligence contacts in London. During breaks in her study, Alexander came to explain various tools of the trade including the wooden box which, using easily replaceable ingredients such as lemon juice, alcohol and cotton wool, contained the necessary elements for written communication using "invisible ink". There was a close-range miniature dart shooter disguised as a pen. There was a lipstick canister that was actually a small bullet canister.

As Mańkowska completed her training at the Abwehr training camp in Berlin it became apparent that a final decision still had not been taken over whether to send her to London. On a further visit to Cousin Teresa's apartment in Warsaw she discussed the possibilities with Witkowski. It was not impossible that the Germans had found out about her "Muszkieterowie" connections, possibly from other Polish agencies. Witkowski thought it unlikely that the "Dwójka" had "such long arms". The Abwehr option was the only chance the "Muszkieterowie" had to infiltrate an agent into Britain. The other possibilities were all too risky. It was fruitless to speculate on the background to any delays on the part of German intelligence bosses in reaching the necessary decision. Over the next twenty minutes, he handed over various items to be delivered when she reached London. His personal letter for General Sikorski described the increasingly perilous impact on the ground of the competition for influence between the "Dwójka" and the "Muszkieterowie". He handed over microfilms, which she herself had prepared some time earlier, showing German bases and fortifications along the French Atlantic coastline, and including drawings of the dry dock at St. Nazaire. There were microfilmed texts to be personally handed over to the British intelligence officer who would, he assumed, question her on her arrival in England. Unfortunately the microfilm machine had broken down, however, so the final four pages had been sewn into a navy blue ribbon which formed the bottom part of a stylish petticoat that she should wear for the journey, but which was not yet ready.

A few days earlier Mańkowska had received a visit from someone whom "Doctor Alexander" identified simply as "my boss". His uniform was faded, and his sweater was patched. Wilhelm Canaris served as head of German military intelligence between 1935 and his spectacular fall from grace early in 1944. His loyalties may already have been more conflicted than the German government appreciated. It is believed by some that there were aspects of National Socialist Germany that horrified him. He sat down beside Mańkowska and shared his thoughts: "You do not have to go. We are wondering whether to take this risk. You are prepared, but it is not clear whether the need exists to launch this mission." There was no direct answer to Mańkowska's question, "Then why have I been trained?". "But if you do go, do you have any wishes before the trip? It might end in tragedy." Mańkowska replied that she would like to see Warsaw again, and a two-day holiday to the city was duly arranged. There is speculation that Mańkowska's true mission, from the point of view of the Abwehr, was to be available in England as a backup in case of a failure by Halina Szymańska's espionage mission. Halina Szymańska was another spy of Polish provenance, who at different stages seems to have been working for more than one national intelligence agency at a time. By the time of Mańkowska's proposed mission to London, Szymańska's close connections to Wilhelm Canaris already went back several years.

That final two-day break in Warsaw provided an opportunity for Witkowski to hand over the elegant petticoat with documents secured in the thick blue ribbon round the hem. She rearranged herself to put on the petticoat while he gave her a final briefing. He reassured her that she would not be arrested when she arrived at the airport in London. Two days after her arrival three men would stop her and apparently arrest her. A brief Reuters news item would be transmitted on the late evening radio news that evening by the BBC, stating that a German spy had been intercepted and detained. That would be a message to the "Muszkieterowie" that she had arrived safely, and a message to the Abwehr that she had been arrested and her spy mission was over. She should then contact the British intelligence services before attempting to make contact with anyone else. After that she should try and arrange a personal meeting with General Sikorski and spell out the ever more dangerous situation between the "Dwójka" and the "Muszkieterowie".

On 24 March 1942 at 3.30 in the morning Mańkowska was awakened in her room at the training centre and told to get dressed. Her mission was about to begin. The instruction was not wholly unexpected and she was ready in two minutes. After half an hour her driver delivered her to the little airport where she received her final briefing from "Doctor Alexander": "If things go wrong, please don't take chances. If you feel threatened, your first priority is to look after yourself. You're flying via Nice in "Vichy". There we'll help you to get a legal British visa." Squashed between the front seats of a Ju 52 transport plane, a few hours later she landed at Nice. Somehow Witkowski had found out that the route arranged by the Abwehr to London would include a stop-over in Nice. He arranged for Mańkowska to have a breakfast meeting with Juliusz Kleeberg, who had been one of the most important Polish generals in the fight against the German/Soviet invasion in September 1939. He was one of those Polish ex-military personnel now living in precarious exile in Vichy France. Although Witkowski through his network was well informed on much that happened in countries under German occupation, his information on the situation in London seems to have been relatively sketchy. Kleeberg was able to provide Mańkowska with more up to date background. The leaders of the London-based Polish government in exile, Generals Sikorski and Sosnkowski were at the centre of a small close-knit group of insiders, determined to protect their powerbase for the future, and intolerant of dissent. Their focus was on how they would govern Poland after the war. Kleeberg's words were not encouraging: "Look and listen ... All who stand in their way are little by little eliminated. Witkowski is doing very valuable work for the allies, but Poles cannot forgive him for maintaining direct contacts with the English. Things may end badly for him".

=== London ===
Mańkowska's first few weeks in London were choreographed - presumably by the British authorities - exactly as Witkowski had told her. After her "arrest", news of it was carried in a brief item on the late evening BBC news, and she was taken to what one source describes as "the Patriotic School, an enormous red brick building occupied by MI5". Her interrogator introduced himself as Captain Malcolm Scott. The interrogation lasted for four weeks. She was carefully and systematically questioned about the training she had received from German intelligence and about the tasks that she had been assigned by the Germans. At one of the sessions Captain Scott provided two pieces of surprising information of his own: the first was more welcome than the second. Her husband and sons were also in London. Her husband had made his own way to England. Her sons had appeared separately and the British authorities had no idea, at least officially, how they had managed to make the journey. Unofficially it was presumed that they had arrived, somehow, courtesy of German intelligence. It turned out that the head of German intelligence, Wilhelm Canaris, had already given Mańkowska his personal promise that if she went ahead with the mission to England, the boys would be sent to join her. The information that they were already safely in England came as a great relief but it was not, under all the circumstances, a complete surprise. The second piece of information was less welcome than the first but also, perhaps, not totally unsurprising. Scott knew that the German intelligence agencies had tried to obtain her a set of identity documents for her, but they had been unsuccessful. The British authorities had been willing to provide her with a British passport, but the move had been opposed by the London-based Polish government in exile once they found out that she had been sent by the "Muszkieterowie". Scott said that the British authorities had been trying to convince the Polish leaders in London that Mańkowska was an Abwehr (German) agent, but the Poles remained implacably hostile to her presence in England. Because of this Scott urged her to leave London as soon as possible.

After leaving the sessions at the Patriotic School had concluded Mańkowska managed to arrange a meeting with General Sosnkowski, a leading member of the Polish government in exile. He made it clear that she was very unlikely to be able to arrange a meeting with the Polish leader, General Sikorski. He added that neither the Polish Government in exile nor the intelligence division of the Armia Krajowa ("Home Army"), the main underground resistance movement inside Poland, found it unacceptable that Stefan Witkowski maintained his own direct contacts with British Intelligence. He concluded with a piece of personal advice, which was the advice she had already received from her British interrogator, "Captain Scott of MI5", although Sosnkowski chose different words: "Please leave ... in London there is something else. An accident is not so difficult. Please eat eggs: it is harder to poison them ... Naturally I'm kidding". A few months later, at his home in Poland, Stefan Witkowski was shot dead. He was shot in the back of the head, but when it was found his body had been turned over in order to give greater prominence to the accompanying card which carried the descriptive message "Największy polski bandyta" ("The greatest Polish bandit"). It would never become entirely clear whether Witkowski was killed by the AK (Polish resistance), or if the AK had simply led the Gestapo to him. Either way, directly after his shooting, surviving "Muszkieterowie" members in Poland, including Teresa Łubieńska, started to be rounded up by the Gestapo. Stories circulated that Witkowski had been in touch not merely with British intelligence and Soviet intelligence. There are also hints that he may have collaborated with the Germans, who occupied the western half of Poland, against the Soviets, who occupied the eastern part and, as matters turned out, would turn out to be the more enduring threat. Although the mutual antipathy between the men who hoped to lead Poland's post-war government Stefan Witkowski is well attested, the precise details of the circumstances leading to Witkowski's killing remain unclear.

=== Edinburgh ===
Klementyna Mańkowska remained in Britain till 1948, but she moved to Edinburgh, far from London and far from the Polish government in exile. Andrzej continued to be based in London where he made himself useful to the authorities, but he was able to visit his wife in Edinburgh at weekends. The couple's two sons attended a British boarding school. Their daughter, Maria, was born in Edinburgh on 20 June 1944. Klementyna worked in an Edinburgh hospital, undertaking translation work for Polish doctors unable to communicate in English. She would never again resume her prewar role as a lady of the manor.

=== Later years ===
In 1948 the family moved to Congo. There are indications that at this stage they were still legally stateless. Andrzej obtained a well-remunerated job with one of the colonial governments in Africa. The family were evidently accompanied in the Congo by Klementyna's mother who died at Élisabethville (as it was then known) at the end of 1958.

By 1997, which is when Günter Blaurock, the German consul general in Lyon presented Mańkowska with the Order of Merit (Bundesverdienstkreuz Erster Klasse) on behalf of President Herzog, in respect of her wartime exploits, the ceremony took place in the presence of the Polish ambassador and Prince Bismarck at Mańkowska's home, the Château de Sermoise, near Nevers. (The Mańkowski's daughter married a French aristocrat in 1970.) Her story had become better known to younger generations as a result of the publication of her autobiographical work Espionne malgré moi, prefaced by Michel Poniatowski, in May 1994 (published the next year in German as Odyssee einer Agentin). The Frankfurter Allgemeine Zeitung, in a book review, described her life story as "too fantastic for a novel". The work wasn't published in her native Poland until January 2003. There is no English version.

Andrzej and Klementyna Mańkowski died respectively in 2001 and 2003. They both died at Sermoise near Nevers in central France.
