= Mankowski =

Mankowski (feminine: Mankowska) is a surname. Notable people with the surname include:

- Bruno Mankowski (1902–1990), German-born American sculptor, carver, ceramicist, and medalist
- Guy Mankowski (born 1983), British writer
- Klementyna Mańkowska (1910–2003), Polish aristocrat and resistance fighter
- Phil Mankowski (born 1953), American baseball player
- Pierre Mankowski (born 1951), French footballer and coach

== See also ==
- Małkowski (surname)
