= Slawski =

Slawski, Sławski (feminine: Sławska), and Ślawski (feminine: Ślawska) are surnames of Polish origin. Notable people include:

- Olga Sławska (1915–1991), Polish ballet dancer and choreographer
- Tadeusz Ślawski (1920–2008), Polish author
