= Chamber of Horrors (Madame Tussauds) =

Waxwork exhibition

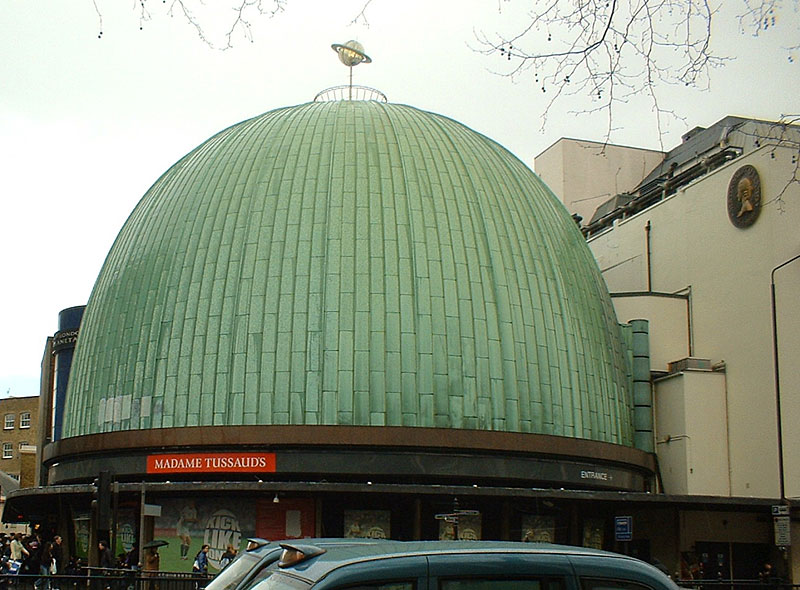
Madame Tussauds and the London Planetarium, home of the Chamber of Horrors

The Chamber of Horrors is an exhibition at Madame Tussauds in London, of waxworks of notorious murderers and other infamous historical figures. The gallery first opened as a "Separate Room" in Marie Tussaud's 1802 exhibition in London and quickly became a success as it showed historical personalities and artefacts rather than the freaks of nature popular in other waxworks of the day. It closed in April 2016 and reopened 6 years later in October 2022.

== Beginnings ==
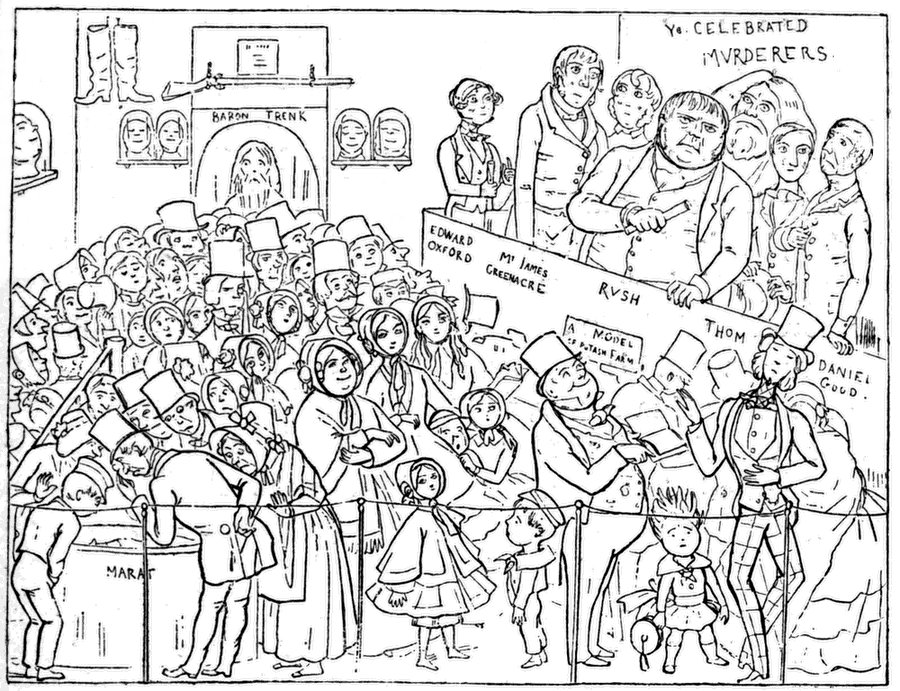
The Chamber of Horrors in 1849 by Richard Doyle

The forerunner of Tussaud's Chamber of Horrors was the Caverne des Grands Voleurs (the Cavern of the Great Thieves) which had been founded by Dr Philippe Curtius as an adjunct to his main exhibition of waxworks in Paris in 1782. Here Curtius displayed wax figures of notorious French criminals who had been executed, as well as members of the French royal family and aristocracy who had been guillotined during the Revolution.

Marie Tussaud, who had trained with Curtius, moved to London in 1802 to set up her own exhibition at the Lyceum Theatre. She brought some of these figures with her and set them up in a separate gallery, and when later she toured her exhibits around the country she maintained this division in her exhibition using a "Separate Room". The exhibits included the heads of Louis XVI and Marie Antoinette, as well as Madame du Barry, Marat, Robespierre, Hébert, Carrier, and Fouquier-Tinville in addition to the models of a guillotine, the Bastille, and an Egyptian mummy from Curtius's collection.

In 1835, Madame Tussaud set up a permanent exhibition in London, and the "Separate Room" became the "Chamber of Horrors". Additional exhibits included Colonel Despard, Arthur Thistlewood, William Corder, and Burke and Hare. The name "Chamber of Horrors" is often credited to a contributor to Punch in 1845, but Marie Tussaud appears to have originated it herself, using it in advertising as early as 1843. Visitors were charged an extra sixpence to enter the Chamber of Horrors.

In 1886, the exhibits included Burke and Hare, James Bloomfield Rush, Charles Peace, William Marwood, Percy Lefroy Mapleton, Mary Ann Cotton, Israel Lipski, Franz Muller, William Palmer, and Marie Manning.

Other exhibits have included George Chapman, John Christie, William Corder, Dr. Crippen, Colonel Despard, John Haigh, Neville Heath, Bruno Hauptmann, Henri Landru, Charles Manson, Florence Maybrick, Donald Neilson, Dennis Nilsen, Mary Pearcey, Herbert Rowse Armstrong, Buck Ruxton, George Joseph Smith, and Arthur Thistlewood.

== The Chamber ==
This part of the exhibition was in the basement of the building and included wax heads made from the death masks of victims of the French Revolution including Marat, Robespierre, Louis XVI, and Marie Antoinette, who were modelled by Marie Tussaud herself at the time of their deaths, and more recent figures of infamous and notorious criminals.

The Chamber of Horrors was renovated in 1996 at a cost of $1.5 million, illustrating crime and punishment over the last 500 years and including items from Newgate Prison. Replica instruments of torture were displayed amid a recording of actors' groans and screams. Actors in macabre make-up and costumes lurched at customers from dark recesses in prison cells; some cells were occupied with waxwork figures, other doors ajar, giving the impression that a dangerous maniac was on the loose. Wax figures included Vlad the Impaler, Genghis Khan, Guy Fawkes, and Adolf Hitler. In accordance with Madame Tussaud's policy of not modelling persons whose likeness is unknown, there was no waxwork figure of Jack the Ripper, instead (until 2022) he was portrayed as a shadow. Figures of disgraced entertainers Jimmy Savile and Gary Glitter were destroyed rather than being relocated to the Chamber of Horrors.

Visiting the chamber was not recommended for young children, pregnant women, or people with heart or medical conditions related to strobe lighting effects.

The chamber closed on 11 April 2016 and was replaced by an attraction named the Sherlock Holmes Experience. In October 2022 the Chamber reopened featuring the Kray twins, John Christie, John Haigh, Dennis Nilsen, Ruth Ellis and Aaron Kosminski's likeness as Jack the Ripper, as well as the death masks of King Louis XVI, Marie Antoinette, Robespierre, Carrier, and Hebert. It also featured the French guillotine.

Some exhibits in the Chamber of Horrors

Execution of Charles Peace by William Marwood – 1879

Murderers Diereneuk and Barmouth with Dr Crippen in the dock (c. 1910)

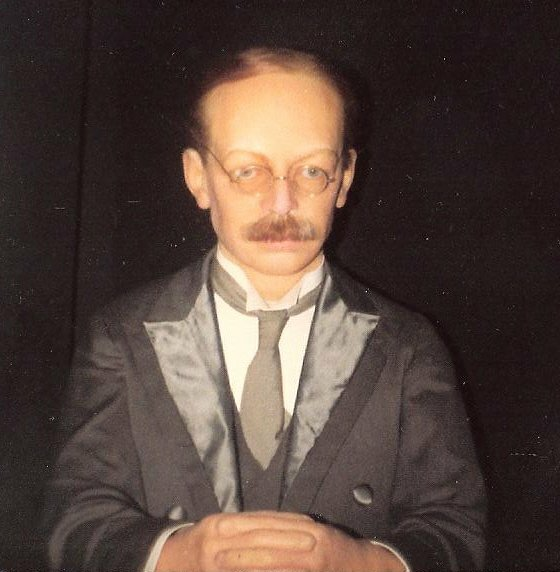
Dr Crippen

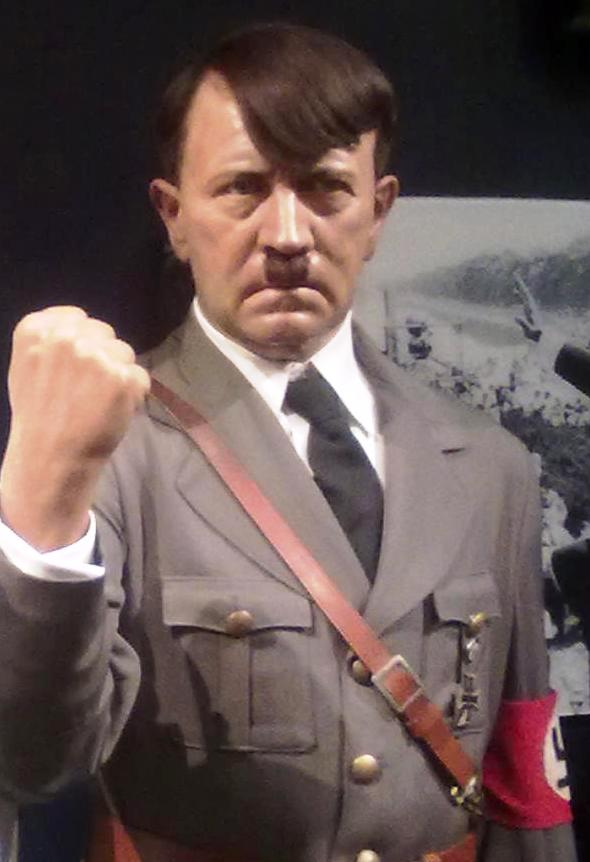
Adolf Hitler

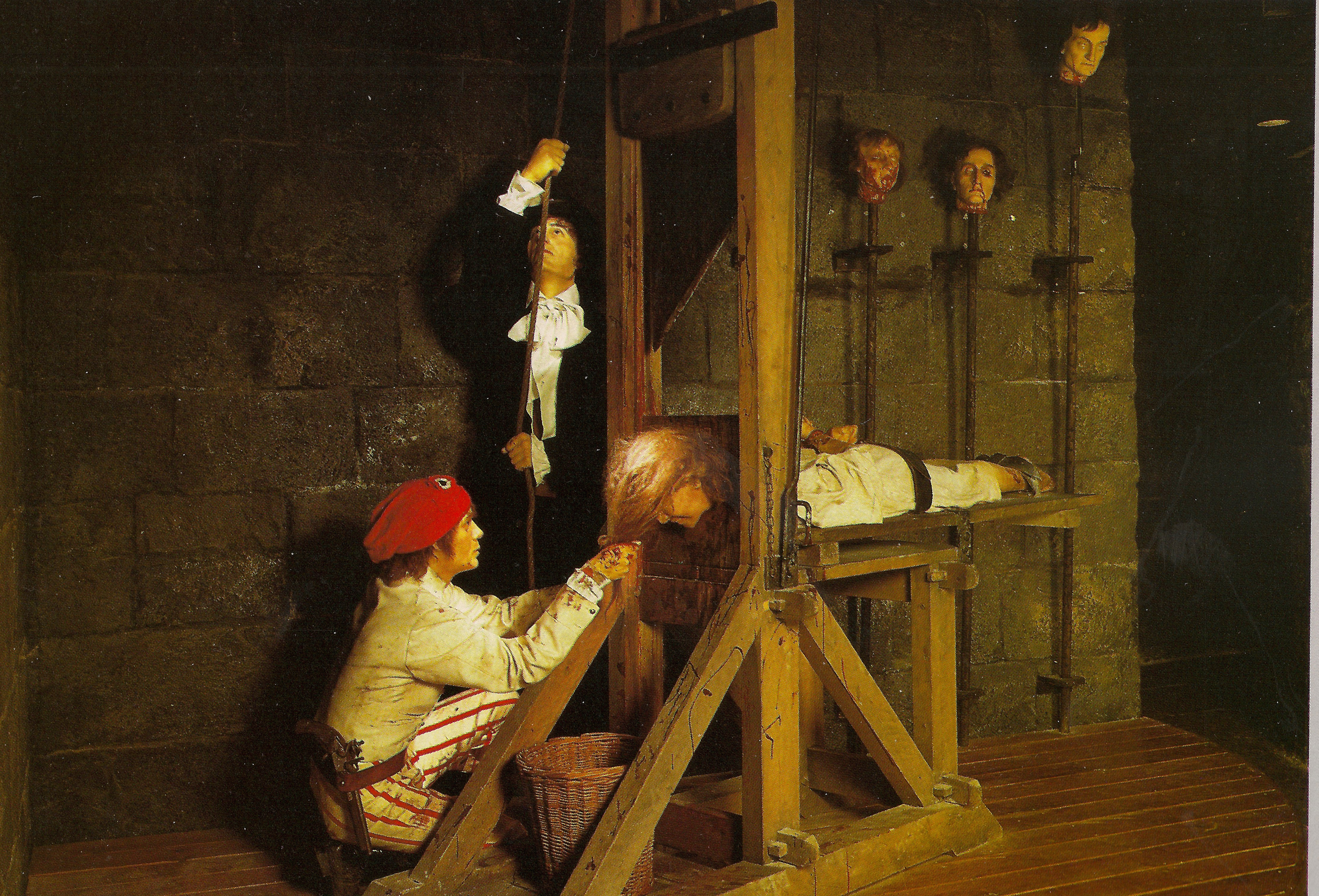
Guillotine, late 1970s

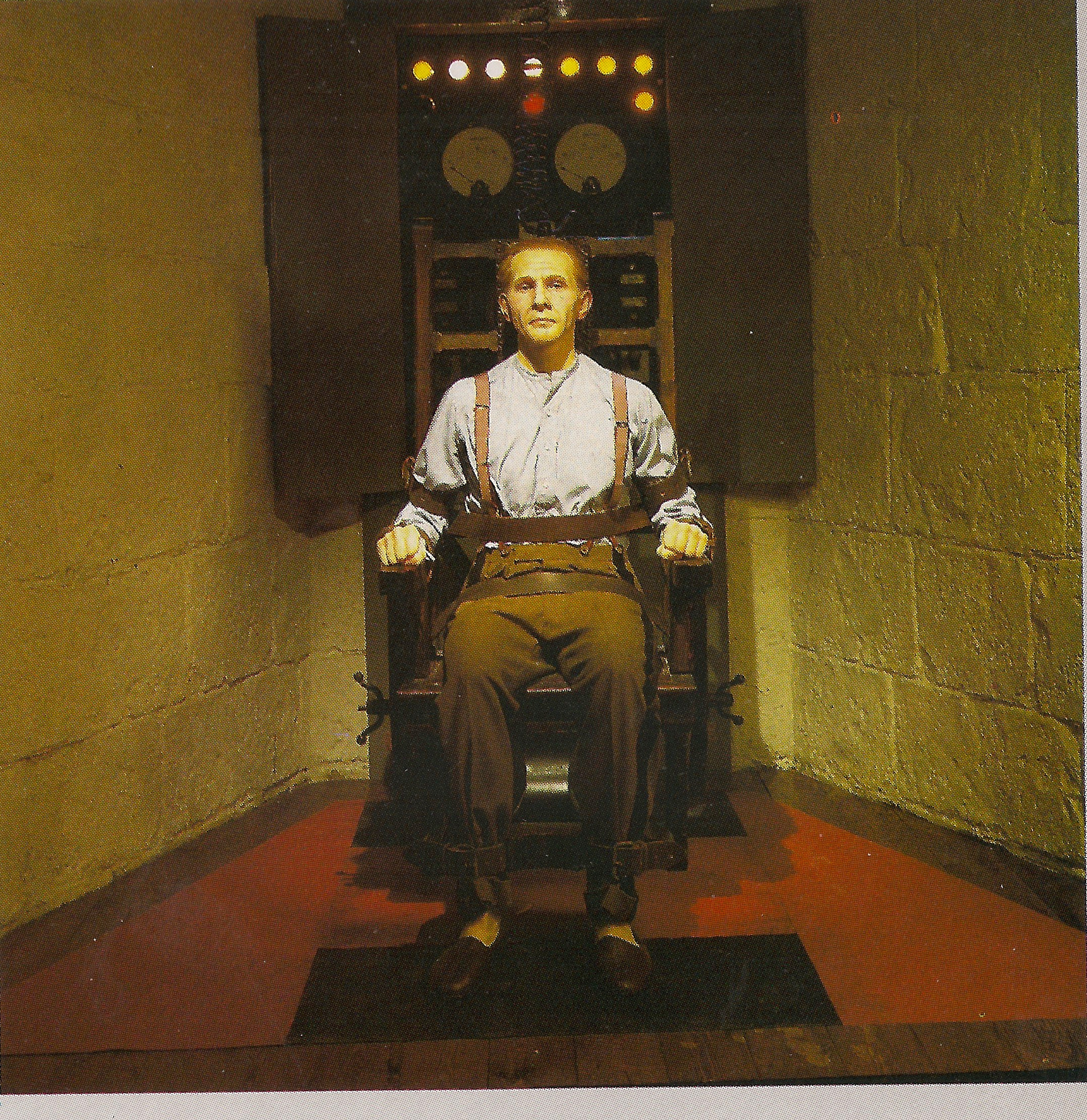
Bruno Hauptmann in the electric chair

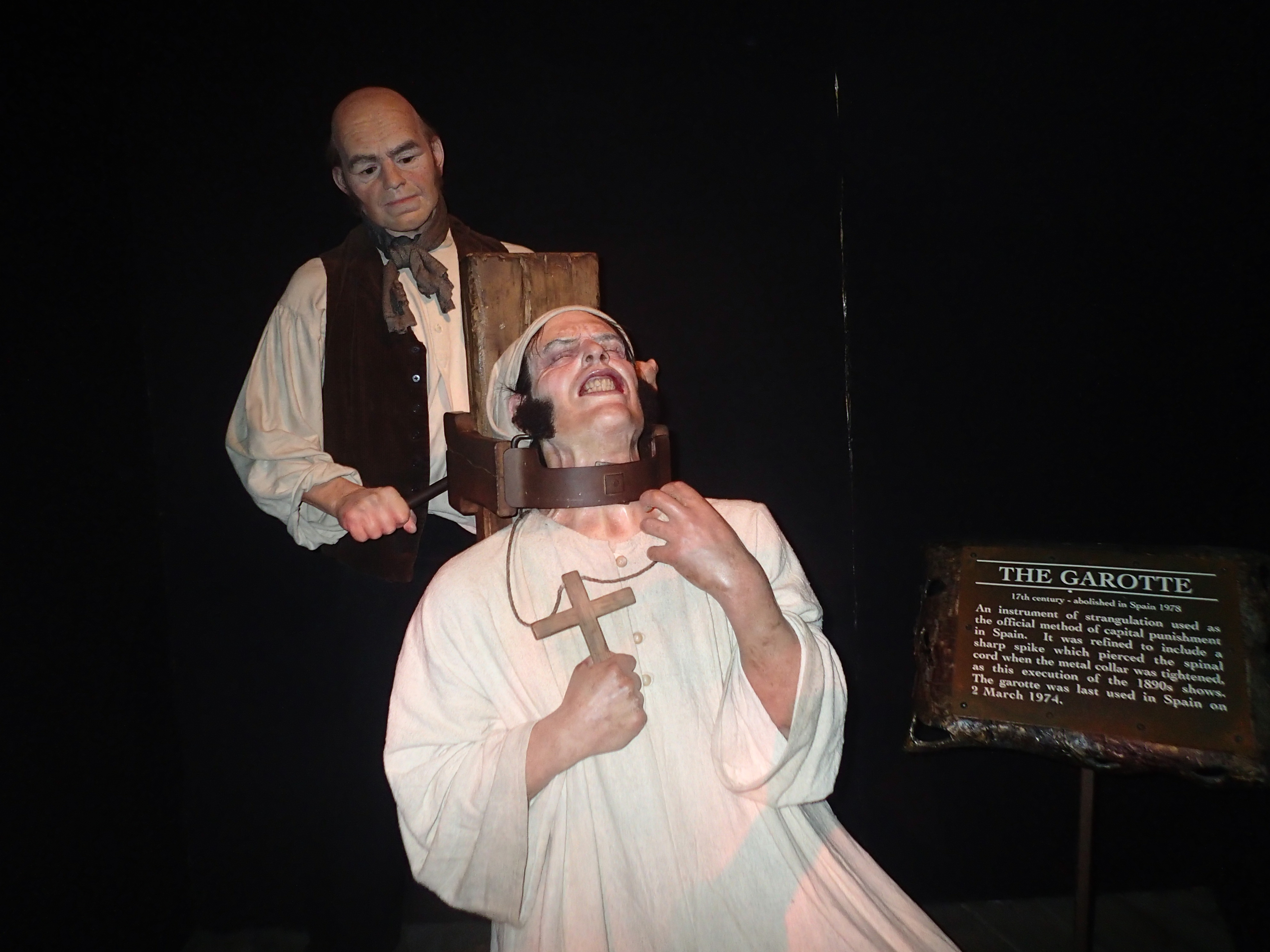
Garotte

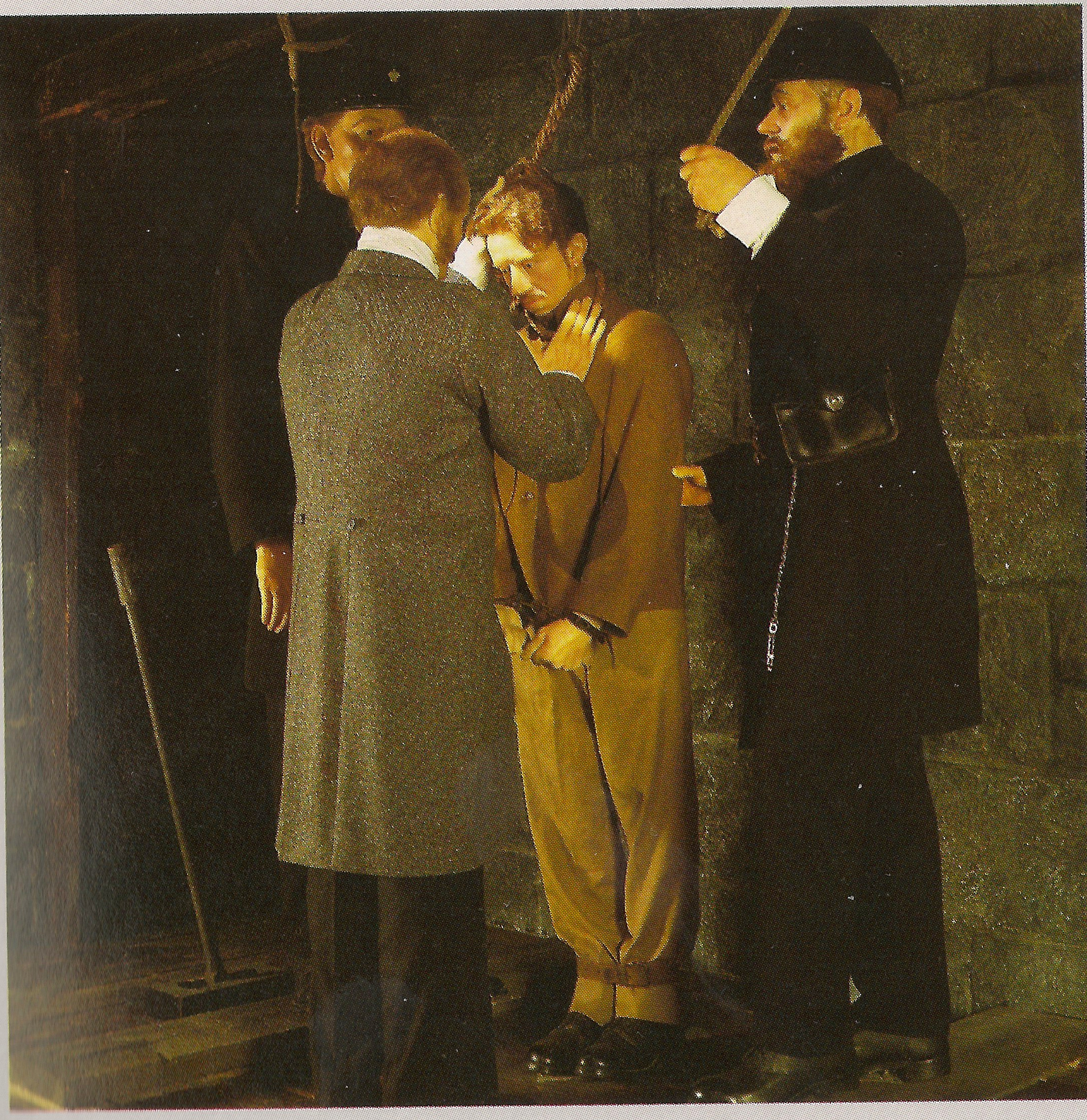
Gallows execution of Dr Crippen

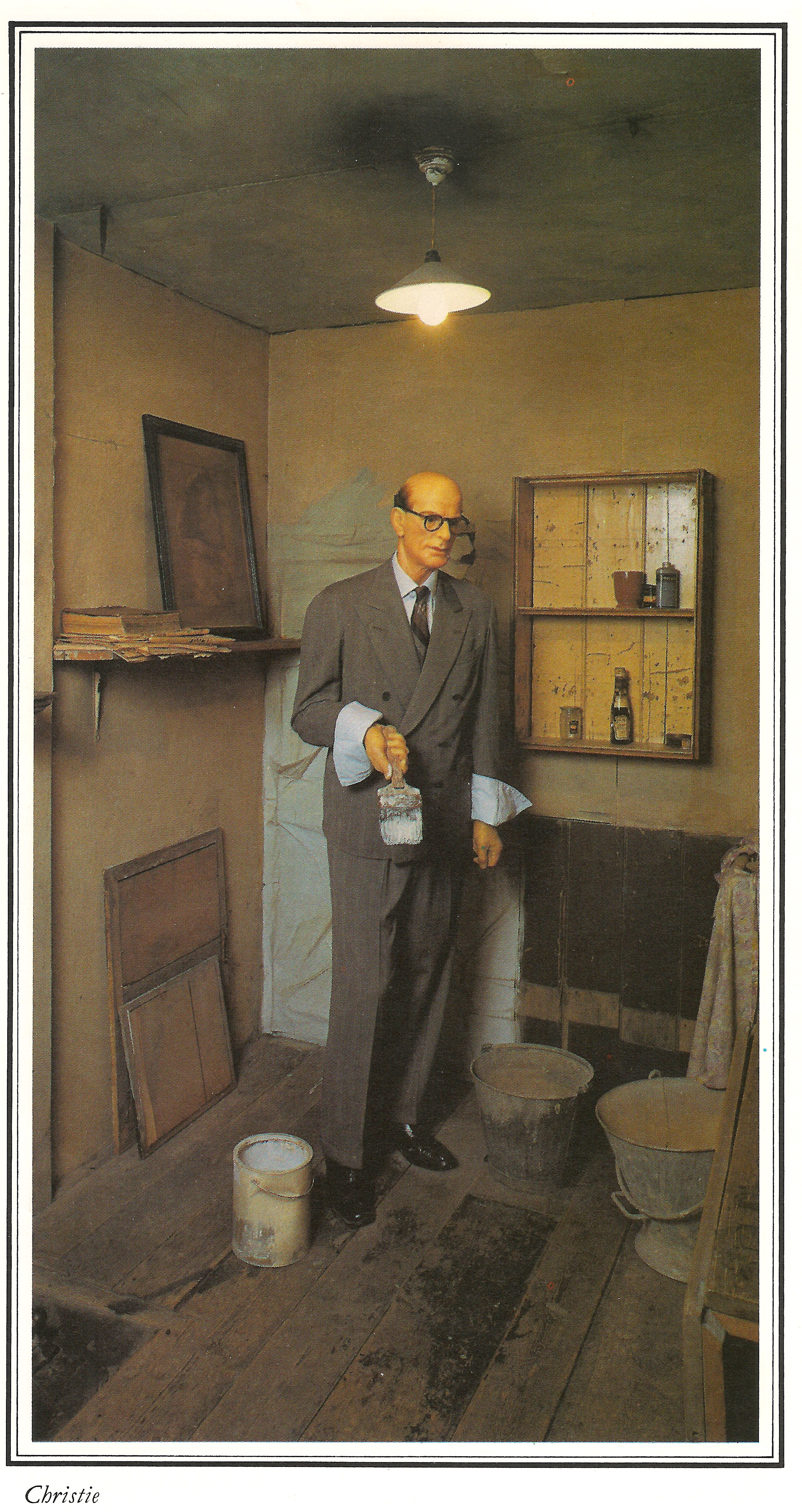
John Christie

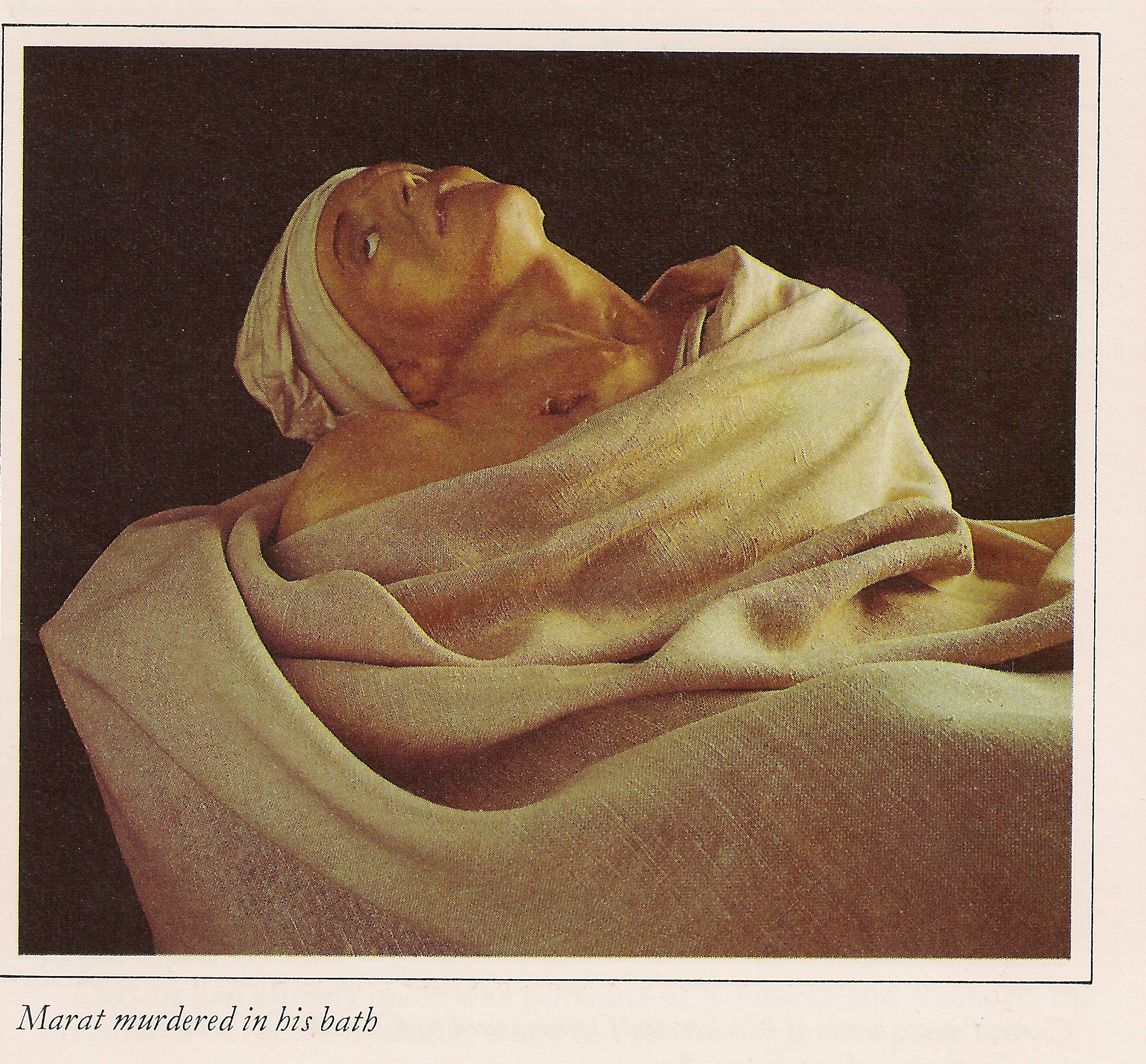
The death of Jean-Paul Marat
