= Vysichka Castle =

Castle in Vysichka, Ternopil Oblast, Ukraine

- Висічанський замок
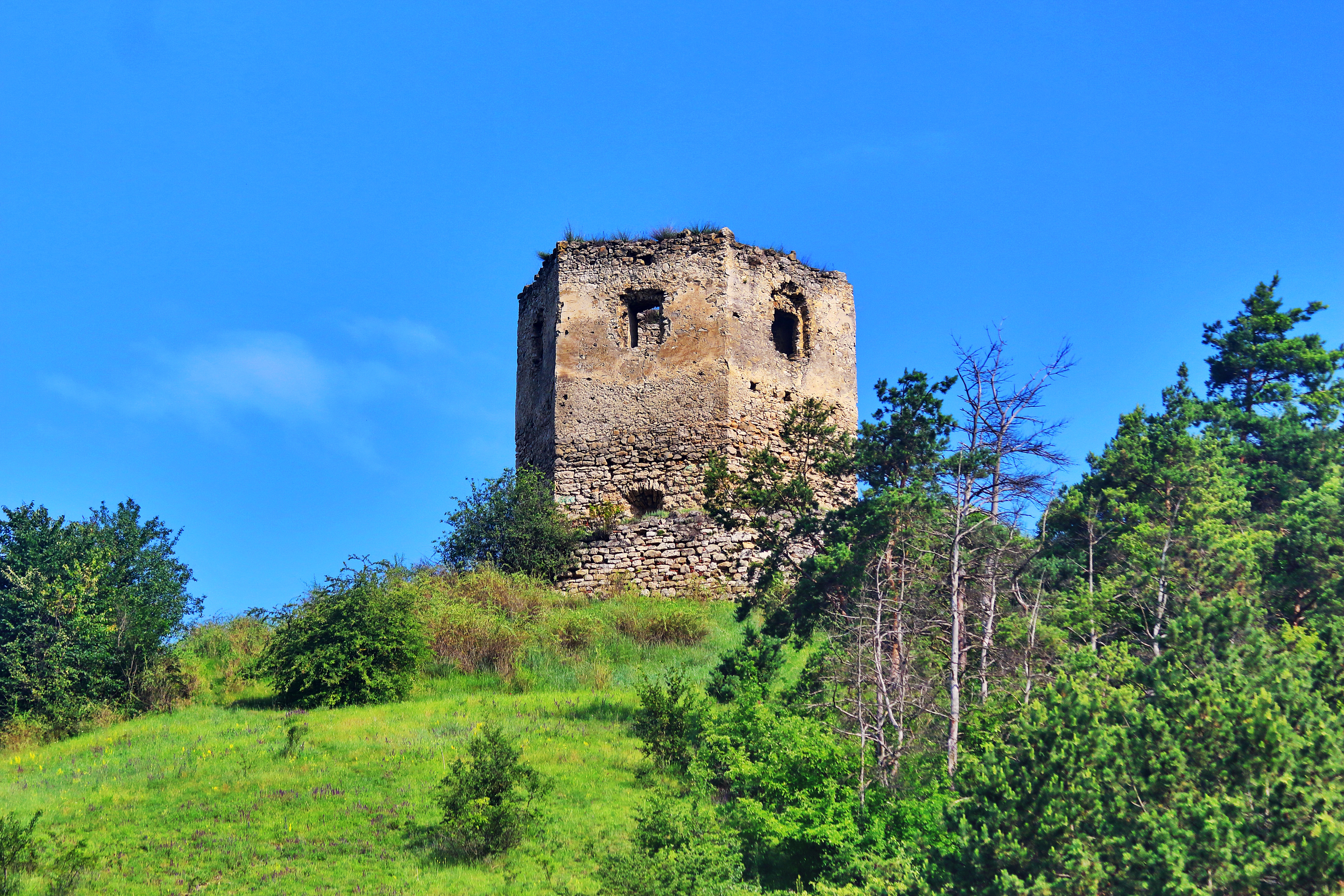
- The southeastern tower of the castle

General information
- Location: Vysichka, Chortkiv Raion, Ternopil Oblast, Ukraine
- Coordinates: 48°47′17.2″N 25°59′11.5″E

Immovable Monument of National Significance of Ukraine
- Official name: Замок (руїни) (мур.) (Castle (ruins) (stone))
- Type: Architecture
- Reference no.: 190070

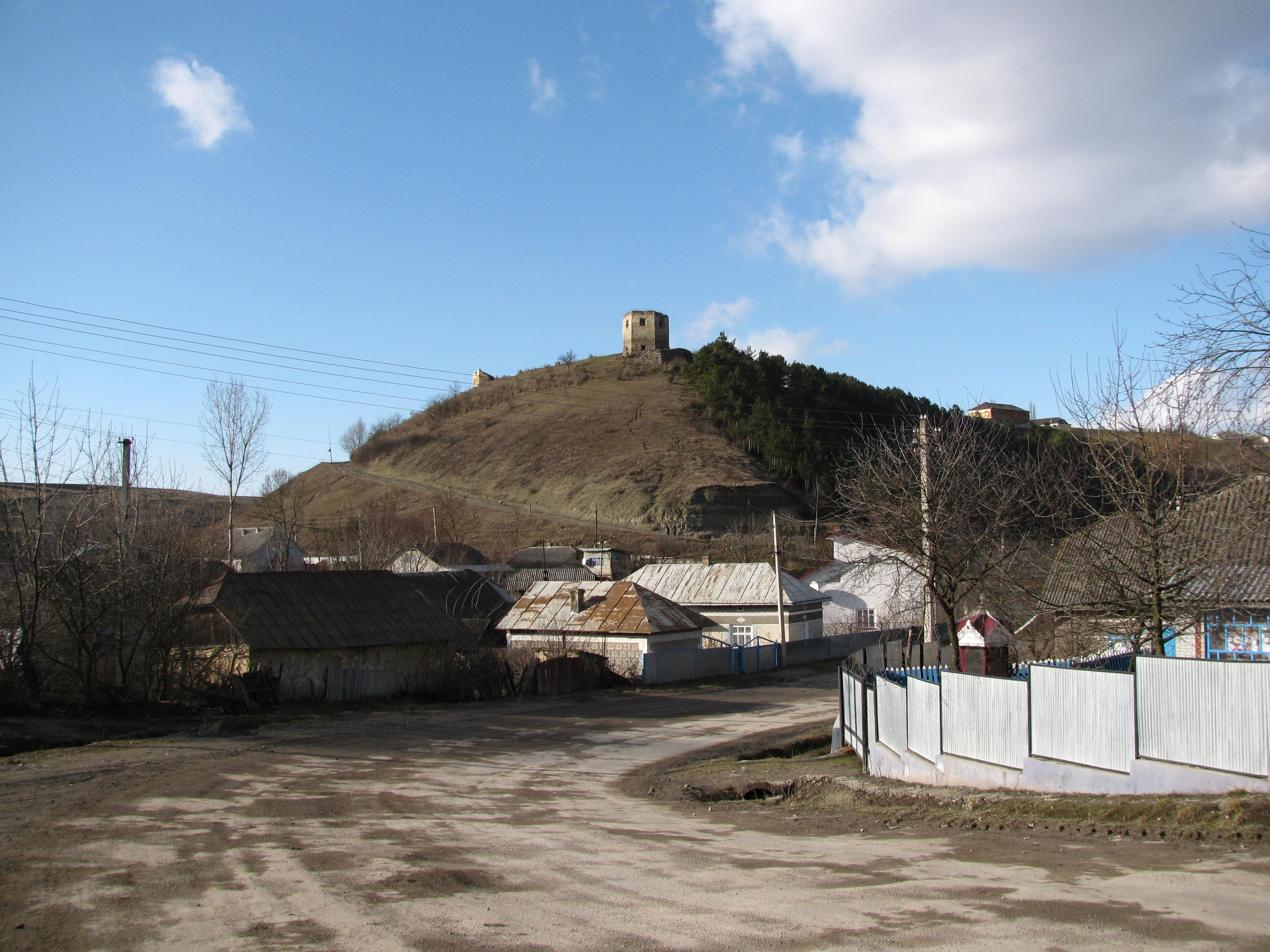
The castle in the 2000s

The Vysichka Castle (Ukrainian: Висічанський замок, romanized: Vysichans'kyi zamok) is located in Vysichka, Ternopil Oblast, Ukraine. The castle was built at the beginning of the 17th century. It is located on a small plateau on a steep and lofty bank at the mouth of the Drapaka River to the Nichlava River, and is designated as an architectural monument of national significance.

== History ==
In 1672 the castle was captured by the Turks, and in 1675 it was garrisoned by the crew of King John III Sobieski of Poland. In 1772, as a result of the First Partition of Poland, Vysichka came under Austrian rule. At the end of the 18th century it belonged to the Polish family of Szymanowski. Around 1800, Tadeusz Czarkowski became the owner.

== Architecture ==
No descriptions, plans or iconographic accounts of the original castle are known. It was built of stone and brick on an irregular quadrilateral plan, forming a defensive perimeter with walls and four hexagonal towers at the corners. During construction on the steepest eastern side of the hill, the structure was reinforced with a retaining wall of hewn sandstone. The towers varied in size, those on the southeast side were more massive than those on the southwest side. There were rectangular slits in the walls of the towers. It is likely that the lower levels of the towers were topped with semicircular arches, while the upper levels were made of wood. The entrance to the castle, from the northern flat part of the plateau, separated by a crosscut of a dry moat and a rampart, led through a gate tower to a spacious courtyard. The residential building rose above the steep southern end of the hill.

== Palace ==
Before 1831, Cyryl Czarkowski son of Tadeusz tore down the defensive walls with the gate, buried the ditch to the north and began rebuilding the castle into a palace, located between the two towers of the southeast and southwest. The castle was built on foundations and rock-cut castle cellars, possibly using old above-ground walls. His wife, Maria (née Golejewska), in view of the childlessness of their marriage, gave the estate including the castle to an adopted relative, Tadeusz Czarkowski (1850-1940), who conditionally assumed her maiden name. At the turn of 1890/1891, Tadeusz Czarkowski-Golejewski repaired the ruins of Vysichka castle. From then on, the farm there was taken care of by his mother, Wiktoria Czarkowska. In May 1891 Tadeusz's family settled there, his wife Maria (daughter of Filip Zaleski) and sons Cyryl and Wiktor.

In her will, written on 1 October 1893, Maria Czarkowska (who died on 14 October 1893) wrote: "I appoint my adoptive son Tadeusz Czarkowski-Golejewski as my universal heir" (at the same time she withdrew her earlier promise to donate the property in Wysuczka to Koziebrodzki's daughter Maria). Tadeusz Czarkowski-Golejewski was the first ordinate of Vysichka, the second was his son Cyryl (1885–1940, victim of the Katyn massacre in 1940 from the Ukrainian Katyn List; as was Tadeusz's second son Wiktor, and the third was his grandson Cyryl (1915–1988).

At the end of the 19th century, the once defensive castle was still standing, almost completely preserved and inhabited. A fire destroyed the palace in late April 1899. In its place, a smaller palace was built around 1910, which remained the property of the Czarkowski family until 1939. In 1939, the palace and adjacent parts of the old castle were in good condition. The castle-palace was home to its owner. After 1945, when the southern provinces were taken away from Poland and annexed to the Ukrainian SSR, the castle was finally torn down and demolished in 1991.The village government decided to demolish the four multi-level towers of the castle, explaining its decision by the dangerous condition of the object. The towers were almost completely demolished. Of the four floors, only small fragments up to the first level survived.

Today, what remains of the ruins of the entire complex are the castle's two corner towers: the southeastern six-sided, massive tower with rectangular loopholes in the upper storey burled into windows, and the southwestern tower. Between them are the remains of the palace's foundations with cellars. The southeast tower has survived to the height of two stories. The arches in the lower tier of the tower have retained their original shape. Of the more slender southwest tower, a part of the first story and the archways remain.

== Bibliography ==
- Sulimierski, Filip; Chlebowski, Bronisław; Walewski, Władysław (1895). Słownik geograficzny Królestwa Polskiego i innych krajów słowiańskich. Vol. XIV. Warszawa.
- Polak, Tadeusz (1997). Zamki na Kresach. Andrzej Łotysz (fot.). Warszawa: Paweł Okoń. ISBN 83-907506-1-9. OCLC 751246373.
- Czarkowski-Golejewski, Tadeusz (1905). Pamiętnik Tadeusza Czarkowskiego-Golejewskiego pierwszego ordynata na Wysuczce. Poświęcony dzieciom i wnukom oraz najbliższej rodzinie. Borszczów: Drukarnia P. Seidmana. p. 1-287.
- Rąkowski, Grzegorz (2006). Przewodnik krajoznawczo-historyczny po Ukrainie Zachodniej. Część II. Pruszków: Oficyna Wydawnicza „Rewasz”. p. 1-463. ISBN 83-89188-46-5.
