= Railway Murders =

British history documentary series

- Also known as: Murder on the Railway
- Genre: Documentary
- Written by: William Simpson
- Directed by: William Simpson
- Presented by: Nicholas Day
- Country of origin: United Kingdom
- Original language: English
- No. of series: 1
- No. of episodes: 6

Production
- Executive producers: Patricia Hickey; Lyndy Saville; Dominic Saville; Daniel Thomas; Emma Sparks
- Producer: Ashley Hall
- Running time: 60 minutes
- Production company: 3DD Productions

Original release
- Network: Yesterday
- Release: 2 May 2021

Railway Murders is a documentary series narrated by Nicholas Day. It debuted in May 2021 on Yesterday. In September 2021 it was broadcast on ZDFinfo. Regular contributors include Donald Rumbelow, Judith Rowbotham and Alan Moss. The subject is murders during the History of rail transport in Great Britain 1830–1922.

== Episode list ==
=== Series 1 ===
Episode	Date	Title	Description
1	May 2, 2021	The First Railway Murderer	In 1864, the body of wealthy banker Thomas Briggs is found on the tracks between Bow and Hackney Wick stations in London—the first murder on a British railway.
2	May 2, 2021	The Body in the Tunnel	In 1881, young writer Percy Lefroy Mapleton becomes fixated on a stage actress Violet Cameron and is driven to a violent crime.
3	May 2, 2021	The Police Killer	Shedding light on the murder of Detective Sergeant Robert Kidd, London & North Western Railway Police in September 1895, the first time a railway police officer was murdered in the line of duty.
4	May 2, 2021	The Newcastle Train Murder	In 1910, the city of Newcastle becomes transfixed by the murder trial of John Dickman, accused of murdering a train clerk and stealing his wages.
5	May 2, 2021	The Guardsman	The story of Jimmy Alcott, a troubled young man who, in 1952, staked out a railway station and plotted a theft that would end in murder.
6	May 2, 2021	Death on the Underground	The unsolved mystery of an elderly Polish countess traveling home from a party who was stabbed to death at Gloucester Road tube station in May 1957.

== See also ==
- History of rail transport in Great Britain
