= Nicholas Day (actor) =

British actor (born 1947)

- Born: Nicholas Patrick Day; 16 October 1947 (age 79); Gillingham, Kent, England
- Occupation: Actor
- Years active: 1969–present

Nicholas Day (born 16 October 1947) is an English actor, who is currently the narrator on the Netflix series Myths & Monsters and also starred as Anthony Fox in ITV soap Emmerdale.

== Life ==
Day was educated at Alleyn's School, a private day school in the south London suburb of Dulwich, before studying at the University of Bristol acting with their drama department. Day was a supply teacher at Plumstead Manor School for Girls' for a brief time during the early 1980s, where he taught drama.

== Acting ==
He is perhaps best known for playing Detective Sergeant Michael Morley in Minder from 1991 to 1993. He also played Deputy Assistant Commissioner Donald Bevan in Series One of the BBC drama New Tricks. He portrayed Jack The Ripper, in series six (episode five) of Goodnight Sweetheart in 1999, and played another police officer, DCS John Meredith, in a single episode of Foyle's War in 2008. In 2009 he appeared in Margaret and The Take, and as Martin Crisp in The Dogleg Murders (Series 12 of Midsomer Murders).

His film roles include appearances in Penelope Pulls It Off (1975), The Golden Bowl (2000), Russian Dolls (2005) and Amazing Grace (2006).

=== 2010s ===
In 2010 he played Colonel Montford in Joe Johnston's horror film The Wolfman.

In 2013, he played the headmaster in Alan Bennett's play The History Boys at Sheffield's Crucible Theatre.

He also worked with the Royal Shakespeare Company for seven seasons including the World Shakespeare Festival, working on classics like The Tempest and Twelfth Night.

Since 2015 he has presented Murder Maps, which is made by Netflix in the United Kingdom and is now in its fifth series in the UK. Murder Maps is also shown on Yesterday. In 2021, he narrated Railway Murders.

=== 2020s ===
Day played Anthony Fox, the father of Ruby and grandfather of Stephanie, in ITV soap opera Emmerdale. The character was killed off when it was discovered that he had sexually abused his daughter and was actually the father of Stephanie.

== Filmography ==
Year	Title	Role	Notes
1975	Penelope Pulls It Off	Jeremiah	
1977	Ripping Yarns	Sgt. Major Errol	1 episode "Escape from Stalag Luft 112 B"
1980	Can We Get on Now, Please?	Mr. Marplot	1 episode "Variations in Two Flats"
1980	Grundy	Salvatore	1 episode "Hands Across the Table"
1981	Cribb	Igor Ozolin	1 episode "The Hand That Rocks the Cradle"
1981	Chintz	James Oglethorpe	1 episode
1981	It Takes a Worried Man	Gaskell	1 episode "Frankly Speaking"
1981	BBC2 Playhouse	Surg. Lt. Commander	1 episode "The Grudge Fight"
1982	ITV Playhouse	Dr. Holroyd	1 episode "Grandad"
1982	Harry's Game	Bannen	3 episodes
1982–1983	Shelley	Sissons/DHSS Man	2 episodes
1983	The Citadel	Paul Deedman	3 episodes
1983	Crown Court		1 episode "A Matter of Trust: Part 1"
1983	The Bounder	P.C. Baxter	1 episode "Raffles"
1983	Heartattack Hotel	Roddie	TV movie
1983–1985	Up the Elephant and Round the Castle	Councillor Arnold Moggs/D.H.S.S. Manager	11 episodes
1984	Foxy Lady	Mark Patton	1 episode
1984	Pull the Other One	Vicar	1 episode "Grandma Strikes Back"
1985	Summer Season	Merton	1 episode "A Still Small Shout"
1985–1986	C.A.T.S. Eyes	Burgas/Fairbrother	2 episodes
1986	Lord Mountbatten: The Last Viceroy	Peter Howes	6 episodes
1986	Call Me Mister	Martland	1 episode "The Bombay Ducks"
1986	Full House	Mr. Blandford	1 episode "And Baby Makes Five"
1987	Bust	Henry Webster	1 episode "Selling a Dummy"
1987	The Michael Barrymore Special	Himself	TV special
1988	ScreenPlay	Parkes	1 episode "Home Front"
1989	Vote for Them	Captain Carrington	3 episodes
1989	After the War	Frank Kitson	4 episodes
1989	Saracen	Terence Swift	1 episode "Three Blind Mice"
1990	Made in Heaven	Vicar	1 episode "Falling for Love"
1990	Never the Twain	George	1 episode "Happy Holiday"
1990	The Return of Shelley	Dr. P. Smith	1 episode "Brainstrain"
1991	Lovejoy	Alec Statham	1 episode "One Born Every Minute"
1991	Trouble in Mind	Malcolm Barclay	9 episodes
1991–1993	Minder	D.S. Morley	16 episodes
1992	Kappatoo	Brian	7 episodes
1992	Countdown	Himself (Dictionary Corner)	1 episode
1993	Drop the Dead Donkey	Tax Officer	1 episode "Henry's Lost Love"
1995	Screen Two	Charles Kendrick	1 episode "The Absence of War"
1995–1999	The Bill	Frank Wallace/Referee	2 episodes
1996	Kavanagh QC	Alan Jacobs	1 episode "True Commitment"
1997–1999	The Lakes	Mr. Archer	12 episodes
1998	Human Bomb	Police commissioner	TV movie
1999	Goodnight Sweetheart	Jack the Ripper	1 episode "…The 'Ouses in Between"
1999	Extremely Dangerous	Gregg	4 episodes
2000	The Wilsons	Mr. Green	1 episode, credited as Nick Day
2000	The Golden Bowl	Lord Castledean	
2000	In Defence	DCI Bran Minter	1 episode, credited as Nick Day
2000	Sabotage!	General 2 – Abel	Credited as Nick Day
2000	The Stretch	DCI Frank ‘Raquel’ Welch	TV movie
2001	The Inspector Lynley Mysteries	Chief Superintendent Hilllier	1 episode "A Great Deliverance"
2002	Daniel Deronda	Lord Brackenshaw	4 episodes
2003	Adventure Inc.	Harold Ashcroft	1 episode "Search for Arthur"
2003	Cambridge Spies	Lord Raveley	1 episode
2004	New Tricks	Donald Bevan	6 episodes
2004	Rosemary & Thyme	Warwick Jardine	1 episode "The Memory of Water"
2004	Godot Isn't Coming	Potts	Short
2004–2007	Doc Martin	Tom Giddens/Dry Cleaner	2 episodes
2005	Russian Dolls	Père William	
2006	Amazing Grace	Sir William Dolben	
2008	Foyle's War	DCS John Meredith	1 episode "Plan of Attack"
2009	Margaret	Cranley Onslow	TV movie
2009	Midsomer Murders	Martin Crisp	1 episode "The Dogleg Murders"
2009	The Take	Freddie Senior	2 episodes
2009	Garrow's Law	John Julius Angerstein	1 episode
2009	Easier Ways to Make a Living	Latimer	Short
2010	The Wolfman	Colonel Montford	
2010	Doctors	John Howell	1 episode "Yetis on the Golf Course"
2012	Eliminate: Archie Cookson	Spymaster George	
2013	Agatha Christie's Poirot	Ingles	1 episode "The Big Four"
2015	A Dark Reflection	Charles Jaspar	
2015	Pleasure Island	Tony	
2015–2020	Murder Maps	Himself	25 episodes
2016	UNIT: The New Series	Kenneth LeBlanc/Heston (voice)	Podcast series, 3 episodes
2016	Jump Cut Jeff	Jeff	Short
2017	Oliver	The Man	Short
2017	Brexit: The Uncivil War	John Mills	TV movie
2017	Myths & Monsters	Himself	6 episodes
2020	The Crown	Jim Prior	2 episodes
2021	The Worlds of Blake's 7	Jorah (voice)	Podcast series, 1 episode “Heart of Ice”
2021	Railway Murders	Himself	6 episodes
2024	Aguska	Malcolm	Short
2024–2025	Emmerdale	Anthony Fox	
2026	Ebenezer	Minister	
