= Percy Lefroy Mapleton =

English murderer

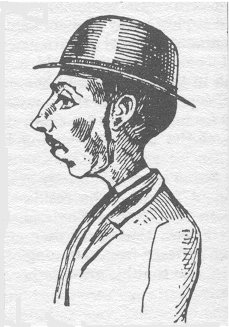
- Mapleton in the first Police composite picture
- Born: Percy Lefroy Mapleton; 23 February 1860; England
- Died: 29 November 1881 (aged 21); HM Prison Lewes, East Sussex, England
- Cause of death: Execution by hanging
- Conviction: Murder
- Penalty: Death

Details
- Victims: 1
- Date: 27 June 1881
- Country: England
- Location: London, Brighton and South Coast Railway
- Date apprehended: 8 July 1881

Percy Lefroy Mapleton (also known as Percy Mapleton Lefroy; 23 February 1860 – 29 November 1881) was a British journalist and murderer. He was the British "railway murderer" of 1881. He is important in the history of forensics and policing as being the subject of the first police composite picture to appear on a "wanted" poster and in a newspaper.

== The murder ==
On the afternoon of 27 June 1881, 64-year-old Isaac Frederick Gold, a retired bakery manager, was murdered on the express train going from London Bridge Station to his home in Brighton. Gold had entered a first-class smoking compartment in the third carriage, and was later joined in the compartment by 21-year-old Percy Lefroy Mapleton. When the train arrived at Preston Park Station, Mapleton was observed getting out of the carriage in a distressed state and covered in blood. He had lost his hat, collar and tie, and had a gold watch-chain hanging from his shoe.

Giving a card which carried the name 'Arthur Lefroy', Mapleton complained that he had been attacked during the journey by two men, who had hit him on the head, knocking him out. Richard Gibson, the ticket collector at Preston Park Station, accompanied Mapleton for the rest of the journey to Brighton, where Mapleton told Henry Anscombe, the Station Master, that he had been shot and wounded during his journey. Asked about the gold chain that had been seen hanging from his shoe, he replied that he had put it there for safety.

From the station offices he was taken to the Brighton police station, where he made an official complaint against his attackers, even offering a reward for their capture. Constable Howland interviewed Mapleton for details of his alleged attackers before sending him to the County Hospital for treatment, where his wounds turned out to be quite superficial. Suspicious that such slight wounds could cause so much blood, the examining doctor wanted to detain him, but Mapleton suddenly announced that he had an urgent appointment in London. He returned to the police station for further interviews, and then—having bought a new collar and tie—went to Brighton Station where increasingly dubious police took him into an office and searched him. They found two Hanoverian medals in his pockets, which he denied all knowledge of.

Meanwhile, the carriage had been shunted into a siding and examined, which revealed three bullet marks and other signs of a fierce struggle, including blood on the carriage's footboard, mat, and door handle, as well as on a handkerchief and newspaper. Investigators also found coins similar to those found on Mapleton.

The authorities still had no reason to detain Mapleton, and he was escorted by Detective Sergeant George Holmes to the home of Mapleton's cousin at Cathcart Road in Wallington in Surrey, where Lefroy was a lodger. During the journey, while walking through Balcombe tunnel, railway workers found the body of an elderly man, later identified as Isaac Gold. He had been shot and stabbed, and near his body they found a knife smeared with blood. His gold watch and chain and a large sum of money had been stolen. The Station Master at Balcombe Station immediately sent the following telegram:

Man found dead this afternoon in tunnel here. Name on papers "I Gold". He is now lying here. Reply quick.

== Escape and recapture ==
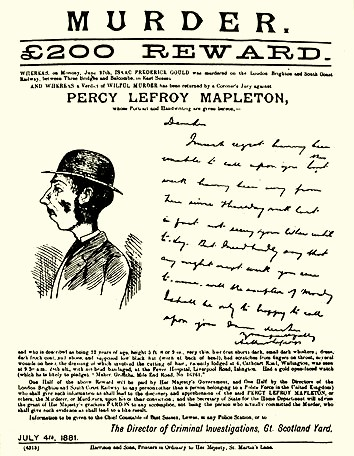
Wanted poster for Mapleton, 1881

News of the body passed along the line and at Three Bridges Station, the Station Master told Detective Sergeant Holmes about it. Holmes was instructed by telegram from Brighton police not to let Lefroy/Mapleton out of his sight. However, having arrived at the boarding house in Wallington, Mapleton told Holmes that he wanted to change his clothes and persuaded him to wait outside. Mapleton then left the house and disappeared.

As the victim had boarded the train within the Metropolitan Police District and Mapleton had announced his intention to return to London, the efforts to re-capture Mapleton were taken on by the Metropolitan Police's Criminal Investigation Department (CID), whose Director was C. E. Howard Vincent. The hunt was notable for Vincent's appeal to the British press for their assistance. The Daily Telegraph published the following description of Mapleton:

"Age 22, middle height, very thin, sickly appearance, scratches on throat, wounds on head, probably clean shaved, low felt hat, black coat, teeth much discoloured ... He is very round shouldered, and his thin overcoat hangs in awkward folds about his spare figure. His forehead and chin are both receding. He has a slight moustache, and very small dark whiskers. His jawbones are prominent, his cheeks sunken and sallow, and his teeth fully exposed when laughing. His upper lip is thin and drawn inwards. His eyes are grey and large. His gait is singular; he is inclined to slouch and when not carrying a bag, his left hand is usually in his pocket. He generally carries a crutch stick."

More importantly, however, The Daily Telegraph published an artist's impression of Mapleton created from a description provided by someone who knew him. This was the first time that a composite picture was used in this way by a newspaper. It created enormous public interest, and resulted in erroneous Mapleton sightings all over the country. In a meeting at London Bridge Station, detective officers questioned all the railway staff involved in the case. Coroner Wynne Edwin Baxter (who was later involved as a coroner during the Jack the Ripper murders in 1888) opened the inquest on Isaac Gold on 29 June 1881. The inquest lasted several days, during which Detective Sergeant Holmes and other officers involved in the case's preliminary stages were mauled in the witness box for inefficiency. A verdict of willful murder against 'Lefroy' was returned. The Railway Company then offered a substantial reward for information leading to his arrest.

On 8 July 1881 Mapleton/Lefroy was finally located in a house at 32 Smith Street in Stepney, where he was lodging under the name of 'Park'. He was found because of a telegram that he had sent to his employer requesting that his wages be forwarded to that address. He had kept the blinds down in his room all day and gone out only at night to avoid detection. The police found his still-bloodstained clothing in the room. He was also found to have exchanged some counterfeit coins and pawned a revolver.

When arrested by Met Detective Inspector Donald Swanson, Mapleton said, "I am not obliged to say anything and I think it better not to make any answer." Swanson wrote this down in his notebook and read it back to Mapleton, who added, "I will qualify that by saying I am not guilty."

== Trial and execution ==
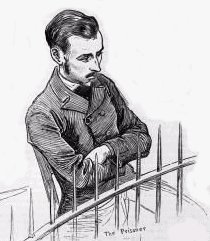
Mapleton in the dock. "It was curious to note the change that took place in [Mapleton's] bearing and demeanour whenever he caught sight of an artist from one of the illustrated papers in the act of sketching him. He suddenly brightened up, and, if I am not mistaken, assumed a studied pose for the occasion."

Mapleton was tried at Maidstone Assizes before Lord Chief Justice Coleridge, with Montagu Williams acting for his defence. The jury found him guilty after retiring for only ten minutes. A number of railway witnesses gave evidence against him—including Holmes, the booking clerk who had sold him his ticket, the train's guard, the ticket collector at Preston Park Station, and a woman in Horley who saw two men struggling violently in the train as it passed her cottage.

It was revealed during his trial that at the time of the murder Mapleton had been desperately short of money and had gone to London Bridge with the intention of robbing a passenger. He had hoped to find a female victim, but finding none suitable, had settled on the elderly Mr. Gold. Incredibly vain, Mapleton had asked for permission to wear full evening dress in Court because he thought it would impress the jury. He was allowed to take his silk hat and took more interest in this than he did in the legal proceedings against him.

According to psychiatrist L. Forbes Winslow, who was present during the trial on behalf of Mapleton's family, Lord Coleridge, in pronouncing sentence, remarked, "You have been convicted on the clearest evidence of a most ferocious murder, a murder perpetrated on a harmless old man, who had done you no wrong; he was perhaps unknown to you. You have been rightly convicted, and it is right and just that you should die." Mapleton replied, " The day will come when you will know that you have murdered me."

While awaiting execution, Mapleton confessed to the murder of Lieutenant Percy Roper R.E., who was shot in his room in the Army's Brompton Barracks near Chatham Dockyard in February 1881; he later withdrew the confession. Mapleton was hanged at HM Prison Lewes on 29 November 1881 by executioner William Marwood. The coroner at Mapleton's inquest was Wynne Edwin Baxter, who had previously presided at Isaac Gold's inquest.

After his execution, Mapleton's waxwork was exhibited in the Chamber of Horrors at Madame Tussauds. In 2021, the case was the subject of Episode 2 of Railway Murders. According to the programme, Mapleton was obsessed with the actress Violet Cameron. Cameron said that she did not know Mapleton.
