= Cyryl Czarkowski-Golejewski =

Polish landowner and wine producer

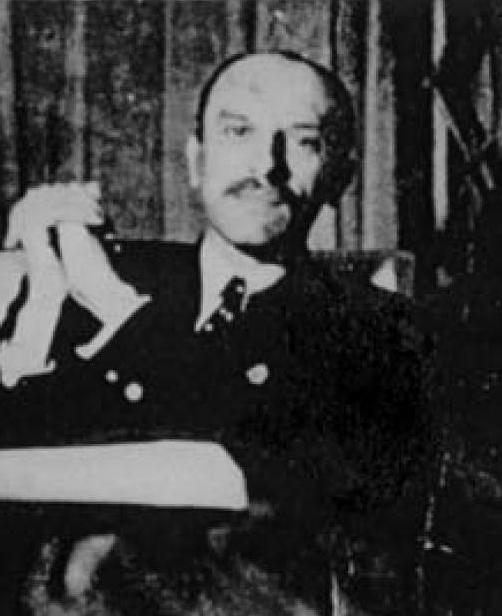
- Born: 9 July 1885; Lviv, Poland
- Died: April 20, 1940 (aged 54)
- Education: Wincenty Pol state secondary school (1903)
- Occupations: Landowner, winemaker

Cyryl Czarkowski-Golejewski (9 July 1885 – 20 April 1940) was an aristocratic Polish landowner and winemaker. Following the German and Soviet invasions of Poland in September 1939, the Czarkowski-Golejewski's were thrown out of the Pałac w Winnej Górze at Wysuczka. In April 1940 Cyryl Czarkowski-Golejewski became a victim of the Katyn massacre.

== Life ==
=== Provenance and early years ===
Cyryl Czarkowski-Golejewski was born at Lviv, Poland. His father Tadeusz Czarkowski-Golejewski was also a land owner: Tadeusz Czarkowski-Golejewski had, in addition, become involved in politics, serving as a member of the Diet of Galicia and Lodomeria between 1908 and 1913, during the time when the entire region was still part of the Austrian empire. His mother, born Marii Zaleskiej (1862–1893), also had an aristocratic background. Cyryl's younger brother, Wiktor Czarkowski-Golejewski, was a cavalry officer who in 1940, also fell victim to the Katyn massacre.

=== Viticulture ===
In 1903, he graduated from Wincenty Pol state secondary school Wincenty Pol state secondary school (Note: "I Państwowe Liceum i Gimnazjum im. Wincentego Pola w Tarnopolu") at Ternopil, obtaining high marks in his school final exams. His father now entrusted him with management of the family estates at Wysuczka in the hill country south of Ternopil, and at that time still in the Austrian province of Galicia. Here he ran a vineyard which, at approximately 30 hectares, was the largest in the so-called eastern borderlands of what became, after 1918 the Polish Republic. By the time the Polish Republic met its end the Wysuczka winery was one of just two such enterprises in the entire country.

=== Connections ===
During the 1920s and 1930s, Czarkowski-Golejewski played an active role in the local business community and more widely. Along with his family estates, he owned land and properties in the adjacent village of Wołkowce. He was a member of the Arab Horse-breeding Association in Poland. A dedicated countryman, in 1927 he published his book entitled (loosely) "Memories of Rutting Country" (Note: "Wspomnienia z rykowisk") which contained personal narratives involving hunting adventures between 1904 and 1919. During the 1930s, he served as president of the Podolsko-Pokuckiego orchard holders' association. (Note: "Podolsko-Pokuckiego Związku Posiadaczy Sadów")

=== War and murder ===
War came to eastern Poland with the Soviet invasion of 17 September 1939. Czarkowski-Golejewski was arrested on his estate at Wysuczka by officers of the Soviet security service on 21 September 1939. His younger brother had already been arrested four days earlier. He was one of those detained in the camp at Kozelsk. There remains a lack of precision over the dating of the massacres grouped together in sources and defined collectively as the Katyn massacre, but the operation is believed to have been approved by the Soviet party politburo in March 1940. Of those killed, approximartely 8,000 were officers imprisoned during the 1939 Soviet invasion of Poland, another 6,000 were police officers, and the remaining 8,000 were Polish intelligentsia the Soviets deemed to be "intelligence agents, gendarmes, landowners, saboteurs, factory owners, lawyers, officials, and priests". Cyryl Czarkowski-Golejewski and his younger brother were among those killed. Their names are among the 3,435 included on the so-called Ukrainian Katyn List dated 25 November 1940 and forwarded to Poland's then deputy Prosecutor General, Stefan Śnieżko, by General Andriy Khomich, the deputy commander of the Security Service of Ukraine, on 5 May 1994. Physical remains of Katyn massacre victims are believed to be among those buried at the unmarked mass grave site known as the Bykivnia graves, a short distance from the centre of Kyiv".

== Personal ==
Cyryl Czarkowski-Golejewski married Izabela Jaxa-Małachowska (1885 - 1958) at Stryjówka on 15 August 1908. Their marriage was followed by the births of their six recorded children:

- Maria Felicja (1909-1994)
- Klementyna Maria (1910-2003)
- Teresa Maria (1912-2015)
- Cyryl Maria (1915-1988)
- Izabella Maria (1917-1988)
- Tadeusz Maria (1924-2001)
