= Sophia Briggs =

- Born: 1821
- Died: 1894; London
- Occupation: Novelist

Sophia Briggs (1821 – 1894) was a British novelist.

Sophia Houson was born in 1821 in London, the daughter of Joseph Houson, a solicitor's clerk and the son of Reverend Henry Houson, Vicar of Southwell. In 1842, she married William Sturges Briggs, a solicitor and the son of Thomas Briggs, the first man to be murdered on a British train.

Briggs published her novel The Gitana (1845) anonymously, signing its preface as only "Sophie". She had previously been identified as the author, which was further confirmed by the discovery in 2017 of a copy she signed as "Mrs Wm Sturges Briggs", inscribed to Elizabeth Pigot. Both Pigot and Briggs' aunt Anne Houson were two of the infamous "Southwell Belles" pursued by Lord Byron.

Sophia Briggs died in 1894 in London.

== Bibliography ==
- The Gitana: A Tale. 3 vol. London: Saunders and Otley, 1845.
- (as Sophia Houson) Love and Art: A Leaf from the Past, and Other Stories. 1 vol. London: Remington, 1878.
