= Franz Müller =

German murderer (1840–1864)

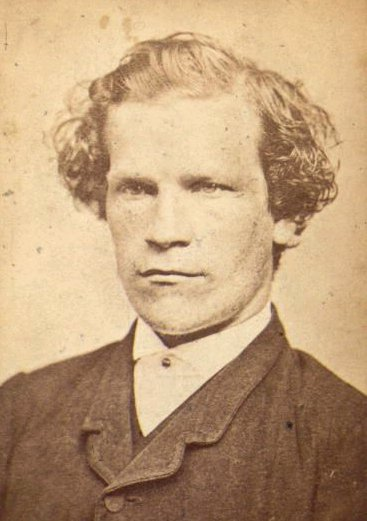
- Müller, c. 1864
- Born: 31 October 1840; Langendernbach, Duchy of Nassau, German Confederation
- Died: 14 November 1864 (aged 24); London, England
- Occupation: Tailor
- Criminal charge: Murder
- Criminal penalty: Death by hanging
- Criminal status: Executed

Franz Müller (31 October 1840 – 14 November 1864) was a German tailor who was hanged for the murder of Thomas Briggs, the first killing on a British train. The case caught the imagination of the public due to increasing safety fears about rail travel at the time and the pursuit of Müller across the Atlantic Ocean to New York City by Scotland Yard.

== Crime ==
On 9 July 1864, Thomas Briggs, a 69-year-old City of London banker and the husband of Sophia Briggs, was beaten and robbed while he travelled on the 9:50pm North London Railway train from Fenchurch Street to Chalk Farm. The assailant took his gold watch and chain, but left £5 in Briggs' pockets and threw him from the compartment. Just after 10:00pm, the driver of a train travelling in the opposite direction spotted Briggs lying on the embankment next to the tracks between the old Bow and Victoria Park stations (the latter being locally known as Hackney Wick), described as "his foot towards London and his head towards Hackney, at a spot about two-thirds of the distance 1 mile 414 yards between Bow and Hackney stations". At the trial, the train driver stated that his train was "just entering on to" the bridge over the Grand Union Canal by the south-eastern corner of Victoria Park when he spotted Briggs. The victim was taken to the nearby, now demolished, Mitford Castle public house on Cadogan Terrace but died of his wounds shortly afterwards.

== Investigation ==
When the train reached Victoria Park Station, the guard was alerted by two bankers who discovered pools of blood in Briggs' compartment. Police later found a black beaver hat. Initially it was presumed to have belonged to the deceased but it subsequently turned out to have belonged to the murderer.

On 18 July, a cab driver called Jonathan Matthews came forward with suspicions about a German man known as Franz Müller, who worked with one of Matthews' brothers-in-law. He told the Metropolitan Police's Detective Branch that the 24-year-old tailor had come to his house with a gold chain in a box. After he had attached his fob watch to the chain, Matthews gave the box to his daughter. The box had been sold by John Death, a jeweller at 55 Cheapside, who identified Müller from a photograph and told investigators that the German had visited his shop on 11 July to exchange a gold chain. This was later identified as belonging to Briggs. With this evidence, a warrant for Müller's arrest was issued.

== Transatlantic escape ==
However, by the time an arrest warrant was issued, Müller had boarded a sailing ship, Victoria, to New York City. On 20 July, Richard Tanner, a Scotland Yard inspector, along with Matthews and the jeweller, sailed for New York from Liverpool on the Inman Line steamer City of Manchester in pursuit of Müller. The faster ship arrived in New York three weeks before Müller.

When Müller finally arrived in Manhattan on 25 August he was arrested. Among his possessions was Briggs' gold watch and a hat. He had altered the hat by cutting the crown by half its height and carefully sewing it to the brim. An American judge upheld the extradition request to return Müller to Britain, notwithstanding the prisoner's lawyers, by way of defence, citing Britain's refusal to hand over some crew members of CSS Alabama (a warship of the Confederate Navy) who had been rescued by a British vessel after the Battle of Cherbourg earlier that year.

== Trial and conviction ==
Much of the evidence against Müller was circumstantial, but prosecutor Mr Serjeant Ballantine made a strong case. Defence claims that Matthews had come forward only to receive the reward had little effect. Müller maintained his innocence throughout his three-day trial at the Old Bailey. After he was found guilty, he was sentenced to death. King Wilhelm I of Prussia (subsequently the Kaiser of Germany) failed to get the British Government to postpone Müller's execution.

== Death ==
The public hanging of Müller took place outside Newgate Prison in London on 14 November amid scenes of drunkenness and disorderly conduct by 50,000 spectators. Although this was one of the last public executions in England, they did not end until the passage of the Capital Punishment Amendment Act 1868.. Müller was hanged by William Calcraft, one of Britain's most prolific executioners.

Despite consistently claiming innocence at his trial and while awaiting sentence, Müller reportedly confessed to the crime immediately before being hanged. Dr Louis Cappel, the German-speaking Lutheran pastor appointed to attend the prisoner, claimed afterwards that Müller's last words (in German) were "Ich habe es getan" ("I did it") in response to the question, was he responsible for the death of Briggs. Newgate produced a death mask of him, now in the Crime Museum and exhibited to the public at the Museum of London in 2015–2016 and the Metropolitan Police Museum in 2025-2026.

== Legacy ==
Briggs had been murdered in a closed compartment that had no corridor, so after the train started there was no way to leave until the next station. Public reaction resulted in the establishment of the communication cord on trains that allowed passengers to contact members of the railway crew, required by the Regulation of Railways Act 1868. It also led to the creation of railway carriages with side corridors, which allowed passengers to move from their compartments while the train was in motion. Old compartment stock was modified by some companies to include circular peep-holes in the partitions—"Müller's Lights". A low-crowned hat, like a cut down top hat, for a while became known as a Muller from Müller's attempt to alter the hat of his victim.

The case was the subject of a 2013 BBC documentary, Murder On The Victorian Railway, and of Episode 1 of Railway Murders, first broadcast on the Yesterday channel in 2021.

== Bibliography ==
- Colquhoun, Kate (2011). Mr Briggs' Hat: A Sensational Account of Britain's First Railway Murder. London, UK: Little, Brown. ISBN 978-0-7481-1567-9.
- Gardner, James (2013). The first British railway murder. Brighton: James Gardner. ISBN 978-0-9536101-2-9.
- Knott, George (1911). Trial of Franz Muller. Butterworth & Co (Internet Archive).
- Fletcher, James Ogden (1867). Railways in Their Medical Aspects. London: J E Cornish. OCLC 931282661..
