= Teresa Łubieńska =

Polish resistance member (1884–1957)

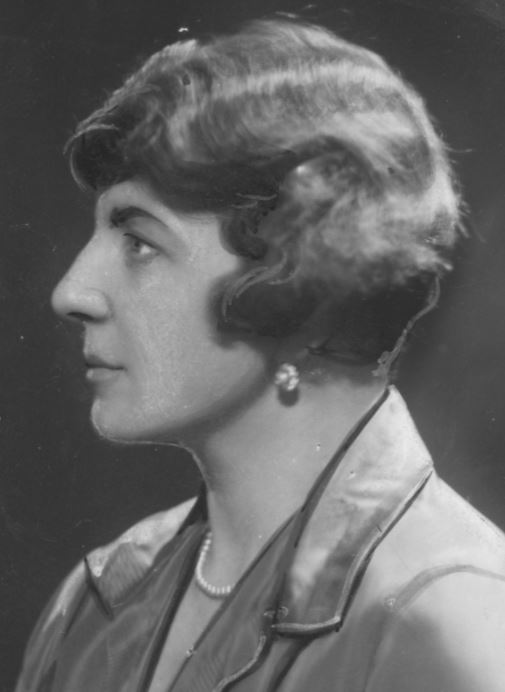
- Born: Teresa Skarżyńska; 18 April 1884; Russian Poland
- Died: 25 May 1957 (aged 73); London, England
- Occupations: Polish Red Cross organiser, Polish Resistance fighter, Home Army officer, and a social activist

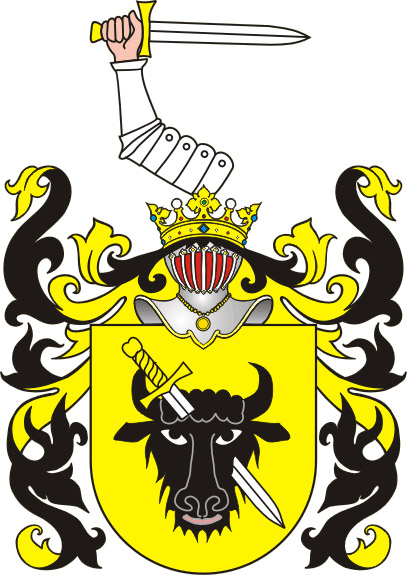
Łubieński family crest

Teresa Łubieńska, née Skarżyńska (18 April 1884 in Congress Poland – 25 May 1957 in London), was a social activist, Resistance fighter – lieutenant in the Polish Underground Army – and survivor of two Nazi concentration camps. After World War II, she settled in England, where she worked on behalf of Nazi-German camp survivors. In May 1957, she was the victim of an unprovoked and fatal stabbing at London's Gloucester Road tube station. The assailant was never traced and her alleged assassination remains unsolved. Her daughter Izabela expressed concerns of a political motive for her mother's death. Łubieńska was posthumously awarded with the Golden Cross of Merit with Swords by the then Polish government in exile.

== Biography ==
Born into a noble Polish family in South-eastern Poland, Łubieńska was the daughter of Władysław Skarżyński and his wife, Dorota Gołębiowska. She was educated at Jazłowiec College, an élite Catholic boarding school for girls founded and run by the Congregation of the Sisters of the Immaculate Conception of the Blessed Virgin Mary, in Jazłowiec in the Podole region. In 1902, she married Edward Łubieński (1871–1919), a member of a once powerful clan, and went to live on the family estate in Łaszów. They had a son, Stanisław, in 1906, followed by a daughter, Izabela, in 1910. There, Teresa became an active member of the Polish Red Cross and continued supporting the 14th Regiment of Jazlowiec Uhlans, an association dating from her school days. She was widowed in 1919. Her son attended a military academy and passed out as a cavalry officer, later killed in the September campaign of 1939. Early during the German occupation of Poland in World War II, Teresa moved to Warsaw and lived at no. 6 Sierpnia Street. During the occupation, she organised assistance for the civilian population of the capital. Her flat was also the venue of clandestine meetings of the Polish resistance cells. In 1942, she was betrayed to the Nazi authorities, arrested and taken to the Pawiak prison for interrogation. From there, she was sent to Auschwitz concentration camp where she was tattooed on her arm with the camp identification number, 44747. She was later moved to Ravensbrück concentration camp, where her death sentence was commuted owing to the timely intervention of the Swedish Red Cross.

After liberation, Łubieńska came to the United Kingdom along with thousands of other displaced persons from German camps. She settled in London where she resumed her work on behalf of war-time prisoners and sought compensation for them. Łubieńska was a close friend of World War II British agent Krystyna Skarbek, also known as 'Christine Granville', who was murdered by a stalker and whose funeral she attended at Kensal Green in June 1952.

== Murder investigation ==
Teresa Łubieńska was stabbed five times on the evening of 24 May 1957 on the eastbound Piccadilly line platform at Gloucester Road, in an unprovoked attack on her way home from a dinner party with friends in Ealing. Until the previous stop at Earl's Court, she had been in the company of a Polish army chaplain, Fr. K. Krzyżanowski (himself a survivor of Dachau concentration camp). A few days before her death, she had told friends that she had been to the police to tell them that she felt threatened and that her life could be at risk. The Police subsequently carried out 18,000 interviews in the course of their murder investigations. Her death remains a mystery. Łubieńska died at St Mary Abbots Hospital, Kensington in the early hours of 25 May 1957. Her catholic funeral service was held at the London Oratory, and she was buried at Brompton Cemetery in London on 1 June 1957.

Inquest

The inquest into her death was held on 19 August 1957. The jury returned a verdict of murder by person or persons unknown and the killer remains unidentified as of 2021.

In 2021, the case was the subject of Episode 6 of Railway Murders.
