= Winna Góra, Greater Poland Voivodeship =

Winna Góra
- Village
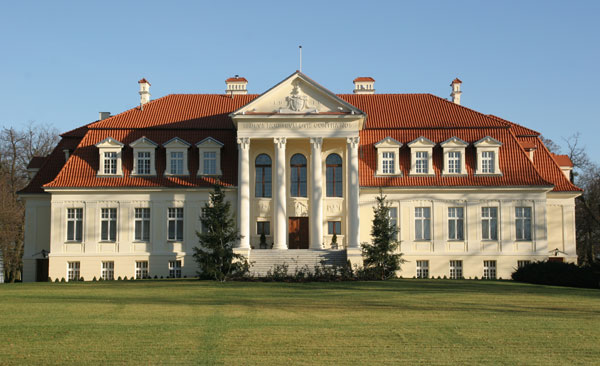
- Palace

- Location within Poland
- Coordinates: 52°12′N 17°27′E
- Country: Poland
- Voivodeship: Greater Poland
- County: Środa
- Gmina: Środa Wielkopolska
- Population: 420

Winna Góra [ˈvinna ˈɡura] is a village in the administrative district of Gmina Środa Wielkopolska, within Środa County, Greater Poland Voivodeship, in west-central Poland.
