= Vysichka =

Vysichka Висічка
- Village
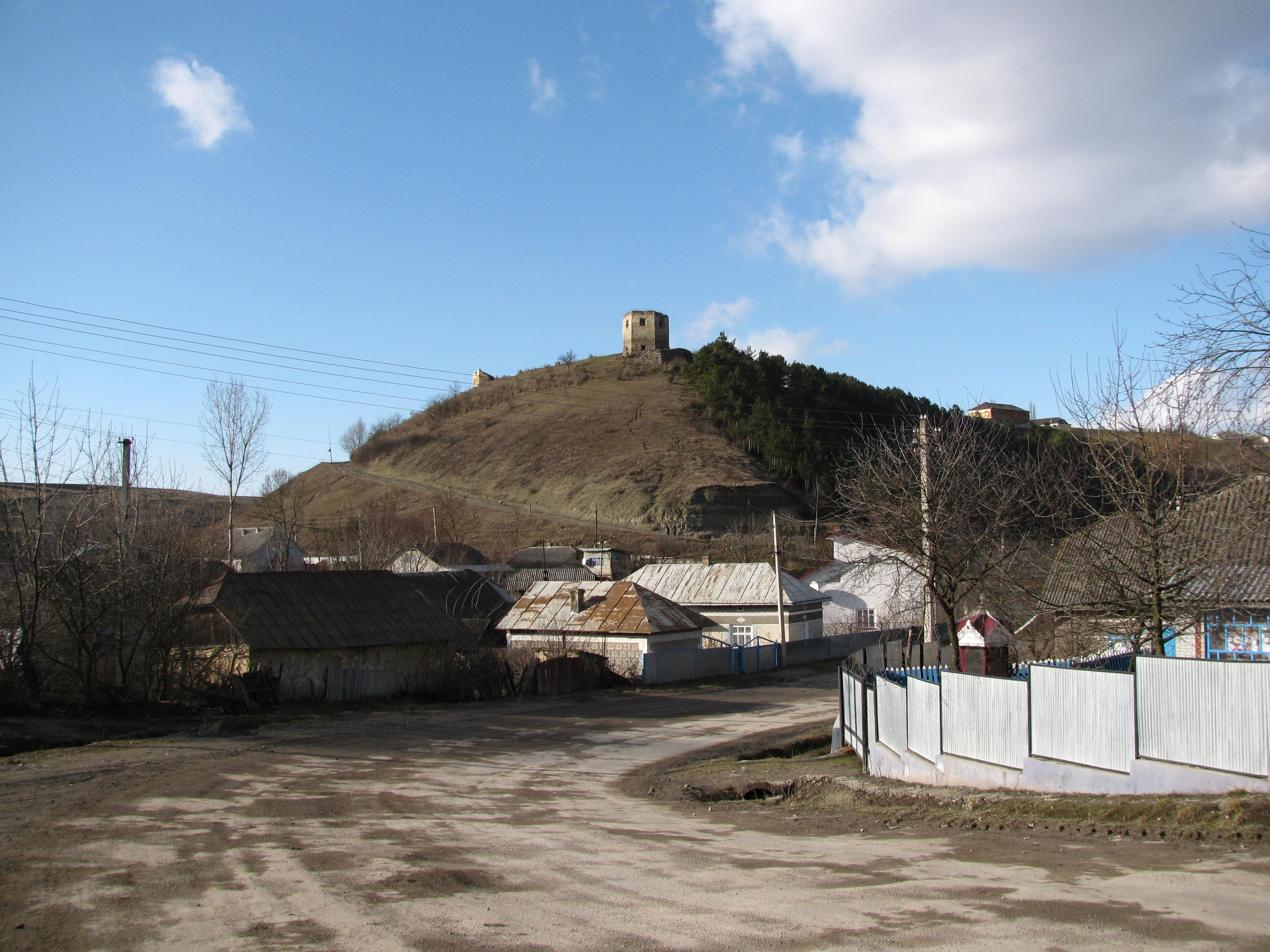
- Vysichka with the castle ruins on the hill

- Location in Ukraine Vysichka (Ukraine)
- Coordinates: 48°47′28″N 25°59′25″E
- Country: Ukraine
- Oblast: Ternopil Oblast
- District: Chortkiv Raion

Population
  - Total: 586
- Time zone: UTC+2 (EET)
  - Summer (DST): UTC+3 (EEST)
- Postal code: 48764

Vysichka (Ukrainian: Висічка, Polish: Wysuczka), a village in Ukraine, is located within Chortkiv Raion of Ternopil Oblast. It belongs to Borshchiv urban hromada, one of the hromadas of Ukraine.

In the village there are ruins of the Vysichka Castle.
