= Olga Sławska =

Olga Sławska-Lipczyńska
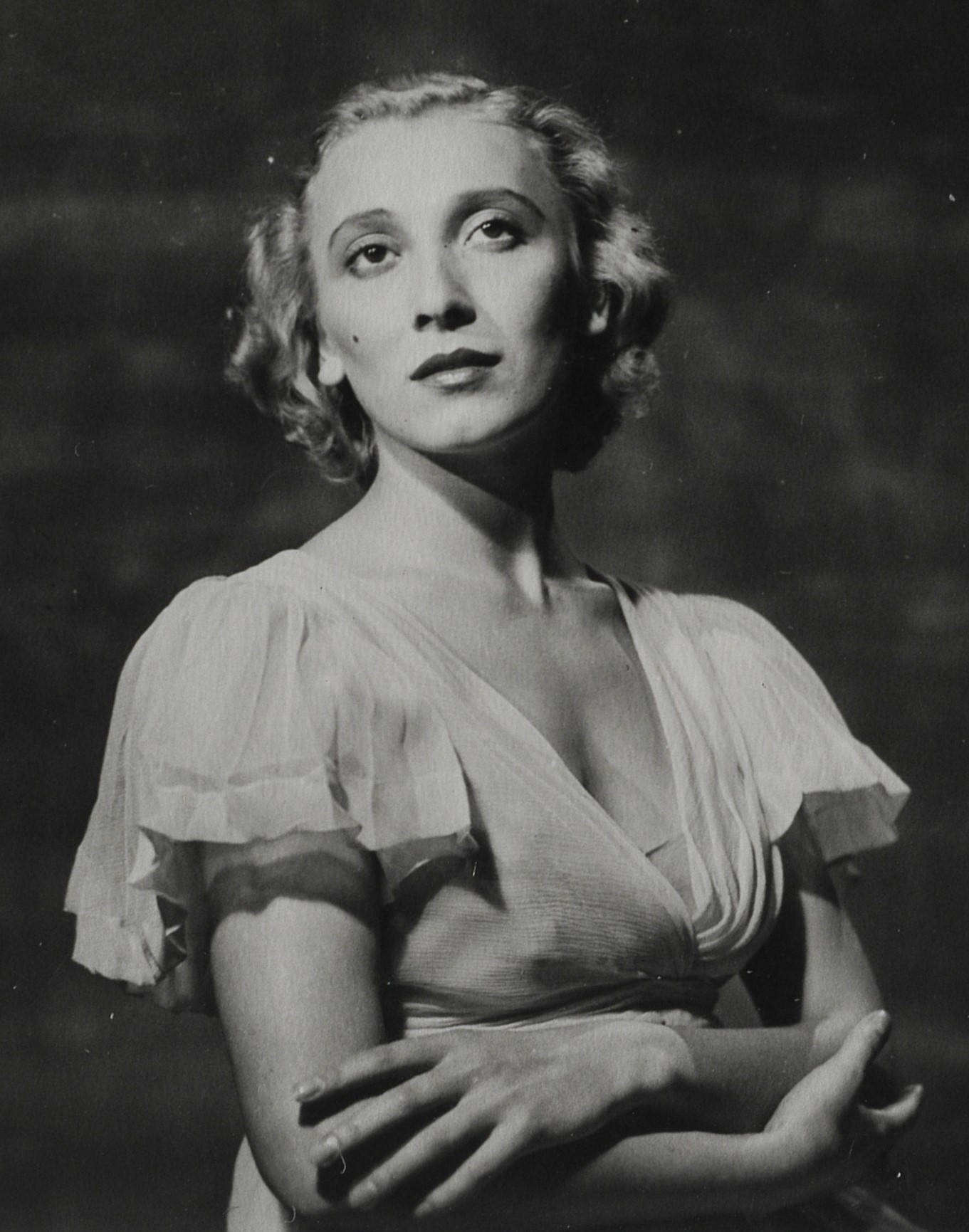
- Sławska in c. 1937
- Born: Olga Prorubnikow-Lipczyńska; 2 June 1915; Lviv, Galicia, Austria-Hungary
- Died: 29 April 1991 (aged 75); Poznań, Poland
- Education: Warsaw Ballet School
- Occupations: Ballet dancer, choreographer, ballet teacher
- Spouse: Michał Lipczyński
- Children: Grzegorz; Paweł; Piotr

Olga Sławska (born Olga Prorubnikow-Lipczyńska; 2 June 1915 – 29 April 1991) was a Polish ballet dancer and choreographer. After 1945, she became one of the country's leading ballet teachers. She was a founder of the National Ballet School (Szkoła Baletowa) in Poznań.

== Biography ==
Olga Prorubnikow-Lipczyńska was born in Lviv, which at that time was the principal city of Galicia, a frontier region of the Austro-Hungarian Empire. It was widely regarded as a Polish city and after 1918 most of the German minority left as Lviv was incorporated into the newly re-established Polish Republic. Olga Prorubnikow's decision to become a dancer came early, and when she was seven she became a pupil at the Warsaw Ballet School, attached to the Grand Theatre. Piotr Zajlich was among her first teachers.

She graduated in 1932 at which point she took "Olga Sławska" as her stage name. She worked as a soloist dancer at the Grand Theatre from 1932 till 1937, becoming a "prima ballerina" ("primabalerina") in 1935. From 1934 she was taking part, with the Warsaw Opera Company, in ballet performances of Coppélia (alternating with Barbara Karczmarewicz in the lead role as Swanildę) and Nutcracker. She was also featuring from early on in the ballet sequences incorporated into classic opera performances, including Carmen, Aida, Traviata and Faust. In 1933 she took part in the International Dance Competition held that year in Warsaw, winning a gold medal. On that occasion, she also won a special prize as the best Polish dancer, which was funded personally by the jury chairman, Rolf de Maré. She also won a bronze medal at a dance competition held in Vienna and an "Olympic Ring" in the Dance Olympics held as part of the 1936 Berlin Olympic Games.

In the light of her international success it was only to be expected that when, in 1937, the Polish National Ballet was revived, Sławska became one of its stars. The new company traveled abroad extensively: she and appeared with them on stages in Paris, London, Berlin, Marseille, Lyon, Brussels, Luxembourg, Kaunas and New York. Commentators noted her "girlish bneauty" ("dziewczęco piękna"). The National Ballet was, among other things, an instrument of "soft-power diplomacy" at a time when the "hard power" of Poland's neighbouring states was growing ever more menacing, and Sławska made a particular feature, before the international audiences, of dancing to the opening theme of the iconic Chopin E-Minor Piano Concerto.

In September 1939, at the dawn of what would otherwise have been the peak decade of Olga Sławska's career, the invasion of Poland from the west by Nazi Germany and, two weeks later, from the east and south by Soviet Russia marked the start of the Second World War and put an end to her professional ambitions for the foreseeable future. She also faced a second personal tragedy at this time. She had recently become engaged to be married to the wealthy industrialist-politician Tadeusz Karszo-Siedlewski. Rejecting the opportunity to go abroad, Tadeusz Karszo-Siedlewski remained in Warsaw following the German and Soviet invasions and was killed there in a German air-raid on 24 September 1939. A couple of weeks before he was killed Karszo-Siedlewski drew up a new will in which he left a substantial amount of property to his finacée. She, therefore, found herself the owner of K.R.Vetter, a substantial brewery in Lublin, and of "Mon Plaisir", a comfortable villa in the then fashionable suburb on the edge of Warsaw known at that time as Błota. It is not clear how much practical benefit she received from her new property, however, since her late fiancé's will was only finalised in 1946, by means of a court settlement with the Karszo-Siedlewski family, shortly after which the brewery was taken over by the new Polish government.

Olga Sławska(-Lipczyńska)'s marriage to Michał Lipczyński in 1941 was followed by the births of the couple's three sons, Grzegorz, Paweł and Piotr.

After the war Sławska-Lipczyńska, now retired completely from her stage work, devoted her energies to teaching, working at the fringes of the theatre world to create love and respect for the theatrical arts. As part of this she organised dance groups in community centres. In 1945 the frontiers of Polish had changed dramatically, with the eastern third of the country (including Lviv, where Sławska had been born) becoming part of the Soviet Union and the eastern third of Germany becoming part of Poland. The changes were accompanied by massive ethnic cleansing programmes of during 1944–1946. In the north, Danzig, which since 1308 had functioned (not without recurring tensions) as a multi-cultural city, became Polish, and it was here that in 1950 Olga Sławska-Lipczyńska took a post as a teacher of classical dance at the Choreographic Academy ("Liceum Choreograficznym" ).

In 1951 plans were unfolded for an equivalent institution to be opened in Poznań. Olga Sławska-Lipczyńska became a founder and creator of the National Ballet School ("Szkoła Baletowa") in Poznań, managing the school in the key position as artistic director till 1970, following which she stayed on as a teacher of classical dance ("...od tańca klasycznego") till 1973. One of the ways in which she was able to ensure the highest standards at the Poznań ballet school involved recruitment. She was able to attract and select some of Poland's leading exponents of dance. Her appointees to the teaching staff included Barbara Kostrzewska and Teresa Kujawa. Celebrities from the world of Polish ballet from among her former pupils include Ewa Wycichowska and Juliusz Stańda. Polish ballet is also indebted to Sławska-Lipczyńska for her 1952 translation of Agrippina Vaganova's text book "Zasady tańca klasycznego" ("Principles of Classical Dance") which has become a near-universal primer for Polish teachers of classical dance.

Olga Sławska-Lipczyńska died at Poznań on 29 April 1991 meaning that, perhaps appropriately, her death coincided with that year's International Dance Day. The dance academy was renamed in her honour, "Ogólnokształcąca Szkoła Baletowa im. Olgi Sławskiej-Lipczyńskiej".
